= List of Moomin episodes =

Moomin (Japanese: 楽しいムーミン一家, Hepburn: Tanoshii Mūmin Ikka) is an anime television series produced by Telecable Benelux B.V., that is based on the Moomin novels and comic strips by the Finnish illustrator and author Tove Jansson and her brother Lars Jansson. The anime series premiered on TV Tokyo on April 12, 1990, and ended on October 3, 1991, with 78 episodes being made. Because of its huge success in Japan, the sequel series, entitled Delightful Moomin Family: Adventure Diary (楽しいムーミン一家 冒険日記, Tanoshii Mūmin Ikka: Bōken Nikki) was made and first aired from October 10, 1991, to March 26, 1992, lasting 26 episodes. The sequel series has only been aired in certain countries outside Japan, where it is featured as the second season of Moomin, combining two series resulting in 104 episodes in total. Unlike the original series, the sequel series does not have any episodes based on Tove Jansson's books. However, part of its episodes are based on Lars Jansson's comic strips, the sequel series does not have a narration either, as in the original series.

In certain countries like Finland and Sweden, several episodes from the combined list of 104 episodes have been left un-aired. In Finland, episodes "The Pirate", "The Imp" and "The Birthday Surprise" were banned due to being too terrifying and "un-Moomin-like", according to the director of the Finnish dub, Jertta Ratia-Kähönen, while in Sweden, episodes "The Pirate", "The Big Explosion", "The Imp", "Snorkmaiden Goes Psychic", "The Water Nymph", "Moominpappa's Second Youth", "Motherly Love", "The Terrible Little My", "Moomin's the Fortune-Teller", "The Fancy-Dress Ball", "The Vampire", "The Phoenix", "The Slug-a-Bed Mushrooms", "Moomin and the Dolphin" and "The Cave" haven't been aired. In Norway, "The Pirate", "The Big Explosion", "The Imp" and "Snorkmaiden Goes Psychic" were left out when the show was first dubbed, and were therefore not aired. They were first dubbed when the series received a redub for VHS releases (except for "The Imp", which were never dubbed). "The Pirate" was dubbed and released only for rental VHS, even three of the four episodes were dubbed for home release, they were not aired on TV after the home release dubs were being aired on TV. The episodes "The Witch" and "The Spell" were aired once, but was soon removed from the Norwegian dub and never had a home video release. and All 78 episodes from the first series have been shown on Children's BBC in the United Kingdom, but the sequel series has been completely left out.

In both Norway and Denmark, the show was dubbed twice – one dub for VHS and one for TV. This was presumably due to copyright issues, which was a common phenomenon in the Nordic countries. This is also why the series was redubbed in Finland in 2017.

In the Japanese dub, Moomin uses two pieces of theme music. From episodes 1-52, the opening theme is "Yume no Sekai he" and the closing theme is "Tooi akogare", both of them having the vocals performed by Emiko Shiratori and composed by Sumio Shiratori. From episodes 53–78, the opening theme is "Omajinai no uta" by Ponpin-tai ~Moomin-dani no Nakamatachi~ and the closing theme is "Itsuka suteki na tabi" by Emiko Shiratori. The sequel series' opening theme is "Hesomagarincho" by Ado Mizumori and Tyrone Hashimoto and the ending recycles the "Itsuka suteki na tabi" theme by Emiko Shiratori. In the versions shown outside Japan, these are all replaced by one opening and one ending theme that are both composed by Dutch songmaker Pierre Kartner.

== Animation in the opening and ending sequences ==
1. To the World of Dream (夢の世界へ, Yume no sekai e) (ep: 1 – 52)
  - Animation director: Masateru Kudō
2. The Song of Magic (おまじないの歌, Omajinai no uta) (ep: 53 – 78)
  - Animation director: Sonomi Aramaki
3. Heso Magarincho (ヘソまがりんちょ, Heso magarincho) (ep: 79 – 104)
  - Animation director: Rie Nishino

Ending themes

1. Far Longing (遠いあこがれ, Tōi akogare) (ep: 1 – 52)
  - Animation director: Shirō Murata
2. Someday, Have a Nice Trip (いつかすてきな旅, Itsuka suteki na tabi) (ep: 53 – 104)
  - Animation director: Sonomi Aramakii

== Episode list ==
=== Season 1 (Moomin) ===
#	Title	Plot	Based on	Writer	Animation director	Original airdate
1 – 101	"The Moomin Valley in Spring" (ムーミン谷の春 Mūmindani no Haru)	Then Moomins wake up on the first day of Spring and discover a mysterious magical hat on the top of Lonely Mountains. At first they find its magic fun, but Moomin is horrified when it transforms him into a strange creature.	Finn Family Moomintroll	Akira Miyazaki	Shirō Murata	April 12, 1990
2 – 102	"The Magic Hat" (魔法の帽子 Mahō no Bōshi)	Moomin and Snufkin rediscover the magic hat (which was previously discarded) and attempt to use it to solve a problem on the beach. They later discover the hat belongs to a wizard known as The Hob Goblin, who is hunting for his lost hat.	Finn Family Moomintroll	Akira Miyazaki	Norio Kaneko; Shirō Murata	April 12, 1990
3 – 103	"The Discovery of a Wrecked Ship" (浜で見つけた難破船 Hama de Mitsuketa Nanpasen)	The Moomins find a boat washed up on the beach which they maintain and decide to keep for Sea adventures.	Finn Family Moomintroll	Akira Miyazaki	Unknown	April 19, 1990
4 – 104	"The Moomins Discover the Island" (おばけ島へようこそ Obakejima e Yōkoso)	The Moomins take the boat out on its first official voyage and discover a mysterious Island which is inhabited by some ghost-like creatures, known as The Hattifattneres.	Finn Family Moomintroll	Akira Miyazaki	Minoru Kibata	April 26, 1990
5 – 105	"The Secrets of the Hattifatteners" (ニョロニョロの秘密 Nyoronyoro no Himitsu)	After spending the night on the island and discovering the secrets of The Hattifattneres, the Moomins discover various discarded items from a ship, including a female figurehead which Moomin can't seem to take his eyes off.	Finn Family Moomintroll	Akira Miyazaki	Masahiko Yoda	May 3, 1990
6 – 106	"Tiny Guests" (小さな小さなお客様 Chiisana Chiisana Okyakusama)	Two tiny creatures named Thingumy and Bob appear in Moomin valley seeking a place to hide from a winter creature, known as The Groke.	Finn Family Moomintroll	Akira Miyazaki	Masahiro Kitazaki; Takaya Ono	May 10, 1990
7 – 107	"The Suitcase" (スーツケースの中身 Sūtsukēsu no Nakami)	After getting some information from Thingumy and Bob about why The Groke was chasing them, the Moomins search for a solution to convince The Groke to leave.	Finn Family Moomintroll	Akira Miyazaki	Masateru Kudō	May 17, 1990
8 – 108	"The Hobgoblin's Magic" (飛行オニの魔術 Hikōoni no Majutsu)	Now free from The Groke Thingumy and Bob show everyone the item in their suitcase which The Groke was after, which turns out to be a large Ruby known as The King's Ruby. But it later turns out someone else was also after The King's Ruby.	Finn Family Moomintroll	Akira Miyazaki	Unknown	May 24, 1990
9 – 109	"An Invisible Friend" (姿の見えないお友達 Sugata no Mienai Otomodachi)	Too-Ticky, a friend of the Moomins, brings an invisible girl named Ninny who had become invisible due to being frightened by the cold sarcastic treatment of her Aunt. It is up to The Moomin to find a solution to make her visible again.	Tales from Moominvalley	Akira Miyazaki	Shirō Murata	May 31, 1990
10 – 110	"The Invisible Child" (笑顔がもどったニンニ Egao ga Modotta Ninni/Ninny Smiles Again)	Ninny is now almost visible again, but her head remains invisible and the Moomins struggle to think of a solution. Meanwhile, a criminal trickster named Stinky is eager to use the invisible Ninny for a bank robbery scheme. It is up to the Moomins to stop him and protect Ninny as much as possible.	Tales from Moominvalley	Akira Miyazaki	Norio Kaneko	June 7, 1990
11 – 111	"The Wings" (大空を飛ぶスノーク Ōsora o Tobu Sunōku)	Snorkmaiden's brother the Snork is testing out some wings he's designed for his flying ship. The wings appear to work perfectly, upon seeing this, Stinky will stop at nothing to have the wings for himself for his criminal schemes.		Akira Miyazaki	Masahiko Yoda	June 14, 1990
12 – 112	"The Pirate" (ムーミン海賊と闘う Mūmin Kaizoku to Tatakau/Moomin Fights A Pirate)	Snorkmainen is taken hostage by a ruthless pirate captain and it is up to the Moomins and all the authorities to find a way to save her.		Akira Miyazaki	Sonomi Aramaki	June 21, 1990
13 – 113	"The Last Dragon on Earth" (地球最後の龍 Chikyū Saigo no Ryū)	Moomin makes a fascinating discovery of a little dragon while fishing in puddles of water.	Tales from Moominvalley	Shōzo Matsuda	Masateru Kudō	June 28, 1990
14 – 114	"Our Neighbour is a Tough Teacher" (お隣りさんは教育ママ Otonarisan wa Kyōiku Mama)	A strict Fillyjonk and her 3 children move into Moomin Valley and the Moomins attempt to the welcome by throwing a party to greet them. The children have fun by Mrs Fillyjonk is not happy about their greeting.	Moominmamma's Maid	Naoko Miyake	Unknown	July 5, 1990
15 – 115	"Snorkmaiden's Lost Memory" (記憶を失ったフローレン Kioku o Ushinatta Furōren)	After falling down a cliff in Lonley Mountains Snorkmaiden suffers from amnesia and believes she is a princess. Can the Moomins find a way to recover her lost memory?	Snorkmaiden the Seer	Akira Miyazaki	Norio Kaneko	July 12, 1990
16 – 116	"A Close Encounter with Aliens" (ムーミン谷に火星人! Mūmindani ni Kaseijin!)	An alien flying saucer is witnessed in Moomin Valley, followed by the discovery of a stranded alien. The inspector is determined to hunt the alien down, believing it to be invading Earth and it is up to the Moomins to keep it protected.	Moomin and the Martians	Akira Miyazaki	Masahiko Yoda	July 26, 1990
17 – 117	"A Change of Air" (ムーミンパパの家出 Mūminpapa no Iede)	Moominpappa, bored of Moomin Valley, insists on running away on an adventure trip with Moomin Mamma, leaving Moomin alone to fend himself. But Moomin does not manage this very well and becomes lost without his parents.	Moomin and the Family Life	Shōzo Matsuda	Masateru Kudō	August 2, 1990
18 – 118	"The Wooden Crate" (海から来た魔法の種 Umi kara Kita Mahō no Tane)	The Moomins discover a wooden crate in the sea, containing strange-looking seeds which grown into a jungle around Moomin House overnight when they plant them.	Moomin Valley Turns Jungle	Akira Miyazaki	Hideyuki Motohashi	August 9, 1990
19 – 119	"Buried in a Jungle" (ムーミン谷はジャングル Mūmindani wa Janguru)	Stinky takes advantage of the jungle and lets some wild animals from a zoo to attack the Moomins, including a pair of tiger who later become friends with the Moomins.	Moomin Valley Turns Jungle	Akira Miyazaki	Sonomi Aramaki	August 23, 1990
20 – 120	"Moomin Saves the Tigers" (ムーミン虎たちを救う Mūmin Tora-tachi o Sukuu)	The zoo keepers want the animals back and it is up to the Moomins to protect them when they decide to live in their jungle. But one day the Jungle dies due to the cold autumn weather and the animals decide to return to the zoo.	Moomin Valley Turns Jungle	Akira Miyazaki	Unknown	August 30, 1990
21 – 121	"Snufkin Leaves Moomin Valley" (スナフキンの旅立ち Sunafukin no Tabidachi)	Moomin wants to go South with Snukfin for the winter, but Snukin refuses as he needs his winter travels for himself. Moomin becomes depressed at Snufkin's rejection, but Snorkmaiden later shows him something exciting to cheer him up.		Akira Miyazaki	Masateru Kudō	September 6, 1990
22 – 122	"Moomin and Little My's Adventure" (ムーミンとミイの大冒険 Mūmin to Mī no Daibōken)	Moomin and Little My strangely wake up during winter and are unable to get back into hibernation. They spend their time with Too-Ticky who is preparing for the arrival of The Lady of the Cold.	Moominland Midwinter	Akira Miyazaki	Masahiko Yoda	September 13, 1990
23 – 123	"Visitors in the Winter" (ムーミン谷の冬の住人 Mūmindani no Fuyu no Jūnin)	During the winter Moomin and Little My discover many exciting winter activities when a man called Mr Brisk arrives in Moomin Valley.	Moominland Midwinter	Akira Miyazaki	Norio Kaneko	September 20, 1990
24 – 124	"Hurry Up Snufkin" (帰ってこないスナフキン Kaettekonai Sunafukin)	It is Spring but Snufkin is late returning to Moomin Valley and Moomin is unwell due to being out in the cold winter weather.	Tales from Moominvalley	Akira Miyazaki	Unknown	September 27, 1990
25 – 125	"The Lighthouse" (パパの夢をのせて Papa no Yume oo Nosete)	After getting inspiration Moomin Pappa takes The Moomins out in their boat to find a lighthouse on a small island, intending to write an epic novel of the sea. But find the lighthouse mysteriously deserted. They also encounter a fisherman who appears to be very unfriendly.	Moominpappa at Sea	Akira Miyazaki	Hideyuki Motohashi	October 4, 1990
26 – 126	"The Day the Lighthouse Lit Up" (灯台に明かりのともる日 Tōdai ni Akari no Tomoru Hi)	The Moomins struggle to get the lighthouse working again and try to work out what happened to the lighthouse keeper.	Moominpappa at Sea	Akira Miyazaki	Masateru Kudō	October 4, 1990
27 – 127	"Aunt Jane" (お金持ちのジェーンおばさん Okanemochi no Jēn Obasan)	Moomin Pappa's bossy and rich Aunt Jane appears to discuss her money matters with Moomin Pappa. Moomin Pappa dreads her visit and goes to hide in the cave by the beach. Meanwhile, the others take advantage of Aunt Jane's money.	Moomin and Family Life	Shōzo Matsuda	Sonomi Aramaki	October 18, 1990
28 – 128	"The Floating Theatre" (浮かぶばけもの屋敷 Ukabu Bakemono Yashiki)	When Moomin Valley is flooded by the sea, following the eruption of an undersea volcano, the Moomins escape on a floating theater which is occupied by a woman named Emma.	Moominsummer Madness	Shōzo Matsuda	Norio Kaneko	October 25, 1990
29 – 129	"The Lost Children" (離れ離れの家族 Hanare Banare no Kazoku)	After spending the night in a rowan tree Moomin and Snorkmaiden become separated from the rest of the family after the theatre floats away in the night, leaving them stranded. Little My also later becomes separated from the family when she falls overboard the theatre, but is rescued by Snufkin who is planning revenge against a strict park keeper.	Moominsummer Madness	Shōzo Matsuda	Masahiko Yoda	November 1, 1990
30 – 130	"Midsummer" (喜びの再会 Yorokobi no Saikai)	Back in the theatre the others arrange a stage play to bring the whole family back together. Meanwhile, Moomin and Snorkmaiden have been falsely arrested for Snufkin and Little My's schemes the previous night. Can they find a way to clear their name and reunite with the family?	Moominsummer Madness	Shōzo Matsuda	Hideyuki Motohashi	November 8, 1990
31 – 131	"The Big Explosion" (スノークの空飛ぶ船 Sunōku no Sora Tobu Fune)	Snork's flying ship is completed but Snork is having problems creating a suitable fuel to get it into the air. An inventor named The Muffle later appears to help Snork with his newly invited fuel, but Snork furiously dismisses him when the fuel doesn't seem to work as he described. The Muffle however sneaks back during the night to try the fuel again but things don't go according to plan.		Akira Miyazaki	Masateru Kudō	November 15, 1990
32 – 132	"The Golden Fish" (まぼろしの金色の魚 Maboroshi no Kin'iro no Sakana)	The Moomins go in search of a legendary golden fish that appears to live in a lake on the other side of the scary forest of witches.		Akira Miyazaki	Sonomi Aramaki	November 22, 1990
33 – 133	"The Spirit in the Lamp" (魔法のランプに願いを込めて Mahō no Ranpu ni Negai o Komete)	Moomin and Snorkmaide find a magic lamp containing a spirit and attempt to make their wishes come true. However, the spirit appears to favour stealing items as opposed to creating new items when granting wishes.	Moomin and the Lamp	Akira Miyazaki	Norio Kaneko	November 29, 1990
34 – 134	"The Kite" (たこに乗ったミイ Tako ni Notta Mī)	The Moomins find a kite caught in a tree and fix it to make it fly. When Little My is denied permission to hold the string due to being to light she comes up with a dangerous idea to ride on the kite. But things go disastrously wrong when the winds pick up.		Akira Miyazaki	Hideyuki Motohashi	December 6, 1990
35 – 135	"The Witch" (帰ってきた魔女 Kaettekita Majo)	After walking in Lonely Mountains the Moomins encounter a girl and her grandmother who live in the forest of witches. After a brief investigation, they discover The girl (named Alicia) is from a witch family and is training to be a witch like her grandmother. Alicia is eager to befriend the Moomins but her grandmother is against the idea of her spending time with ordinary citizens.		Akira Miyazaki	Unknown	December 13, 1990
36 – 136	"Christmas Is Coming" (クリスマスって何? Kurisumasu tte Nani?)	The Moomins are woken up early on during their hibernation with the news that Christmas is coming. The Moomins know nothing about Christmas due to their winter hibernation habits, but nonetheless, they decide to prepare for Christmas's arrival.	Tales from Moominvalley	Akira Miyazaki	Masahiko Yoda	December 20, 1990
37 – 137	"The Midwinter Bonfire" (冬の生物たちのお祭り Fuyu no Seibutsu-tachi no Omatsuri)	After waking up in the middle of the winter Moomin (having spent much of the earlier winter awake) decides to show Snorkmaiden the nature of winter. While wandering out they notice a lot of their firewood have been taken. Meanwhile, Alicia decides to venture out on her skates to see Moomin, against her grandmother's wishes.	Moominland Midwinter	Akira Miyazaki	Masateru Kudō	December 27, 1990
38 – 138	"The Spell" (眠りの魔法 Nemuri no Mahō)	The Witch puts a seeping sell on the Moomins to keep them asleep so Alicia can't visit them. Angered at this Alicia is forced to promise not to visit the Moomins to convince her grandmother to remove the spell.		Akira Miyazaki	Sonomi Aramaki	January 1, 1991
39 – 139	"Things That Go Bang in the Night" (真夜中の不思議な音 Mayonaka no Fushigina Oto)	The Moomins are mystified by some strange banging sounds in the night which one can explain. Moomin, Snufkin and Little My venture onto the beach to investigate and discover the sounds are being made by fireworks. Meanwhile, Sniff finds a girl worn from fatigue wandering Moomin Valley and takes her to Moomin house for treatment.		Akira Miyazaki	Norio Kaneko	January 1, 1991
40 – 140	"The Secret Fireworks" (花火の秘密 Hanabi no Himitsu)	The sick girl Sniff rescued wakes up in Moomin House and provides the Moomins the answer to the mystery of the fireworks.		Akira Miyazaki	Hideyuki Motohashi	January 10, 1991
41 – 141	"Crooks in Moomin Valley" (ムーミン谷の怪事件 Mūmindani no Kaijiken)	The police station in Moomin Valley is due to close due to there being no crooks to be found in the valley, putting the inspector in depression. Can the Moomins think of a way to save his job?		Akira Miyazaki	Unknown	January 17, 1991
42 – 142	"The Solar Eclipse" (魔女のほうき Majo no Hōki)	Everybody prepares to see the solar eclipse. Meanwhile, the witch has a terrible accident and the Moomins take her to Moomin house for treatment.		Akira Miyazaki	Masateru Kudō	January 24, 1991
43 – 143	"The Prima Donna" (サーカスのヒロイン Sākasu no Hiroin)	Moomin falls in love with a prima donna from a circus, washed away in another flood. This puts a strain on his relationship with Snorkmaiden who tries her best to talk sense into him, can their relationship be saved?	Moomin Falls in Love	Naoko Miyake	Norio Kaneko	January 31, 1991
44 – 144	"The Birthday Present" (すてきなお誕生日 Sutekina Otanjōbi)	The Moomins struggle to think of a wonderful birthday present for Moomin Mamma's birthday, including Moomin Pappa whose attempts to make her a present fail several times. Can Moomin Pappa think of a present in time?		Akira Miyazaki	Sonomi Aramaki	February 7, 1991
45 – 145	"Moomin Builds a House" (ムーミンの建てた家 Mūmin no Tateta Ie)	Moomin decides to build a house of his own after Little My's troublesome, younger brothers and sisters move into their house. But building a house is overly complicated and Moomin is highly inexperienced.	Moomin Builds a House	Naoko Miyake	Hideyuki Motohashi	February 14, 1991
46 – 146	"Dame Elaine" (パパは大金持ち? Papa wa Ōkanemochi?)	After hearing about a mansion which was willed to Moomin Pappa the Moomins decide to visit it out of excitement. But after a while, they discover it is hunted by a lonely female ghost who needs company.	Moomin and the Farm	Shōzo Matsuda	Masateru Kudō	February 21, 1991
47 – 147	"The Hot Spring" (温泉が出た! Onsen ga Deta!)	3 men arrive in Moomin Valley in search of a hot spring to attract tourists into the valley. Sniff decides to help the men in hopes of getting rich but the rest of the Moomins know that tourists will ruin the valley's peace and quietness and try to think of a way to drive the men away.	Moomin and the Railway	Akira Miyazaki	Unknown	February 28, 1991
48 – 148	"The Bubbles" (シャボン玉に乗ったムーミン Shabondama ni Notta Mūmin)	One day Moomin, Snorkmainded and Little My decided to blow bubbles. They later use the fabric strengthener Snork invented for his new flying ship, which makes the bubbles bigger and stronger. Things later get out of control when they are forced into the bubbles and get blown away by strong winds. Can they be saved before they get blown away forever?		Akira Miyazaki	Norio Kaneko	March 7, 1991
49 – 149	"The Giant Pumpkin" (ママの秘密 Mama no Himitsu)	Moomin Mamma grows a gigantic pumpkin which the Moomins decide to make into a pumpkin pie. But can they protect the pumpkin before it gets stolen?		Akira Miyazaki	Sonomi Aramaki	March 14, 1991
50 – 150	"The Imp" (枯木の中の声 Kareki no Naka no Koe)	While playing hide and seek deep in the forest, Moomin and his friends discover a mysterious old tree which holds a secret, still alive and forgotten for centuries.		Akira Miyazaki	Unknown	March 21, 1991
51 – 151	"Snorkmaiden Goes Psychic" (フローレンの超能力 Furōren no Chōnōryoku)	After getting struck by lightning Snorkmainden gains the ability to see the future.	Snorkmaiden the Seer	Akira Miyazaki	Hideyuki Motohashi	March 28, 1991
52 – 152	"The Treasure Hunt" (宝探しで大騒ぎ Takarasagashi de Ōsawagi)	A prospector arrives in Moomn Valley looking for gold. Before leaving he gives the Moomins a treasure map and they decide to go treasure hunting, but is the map genuine and is there really treasure to be found?	Moomin and the Goldfields	Akira Miyazaki	Masateru Kudō	April 4, 1991
53 – 153	"The Water Nymph" (水の妖精 Mizu no Yōsei)	Sniff finds a mysterious pond deep in the woods and becomes hypnotically attracted to a mysterious looking woman who appears in the pond. Things become serious as other men and boys discover the pond and also become hypnotically attracted. The women and girls desperately try to think of a solution.		Shōzo Matsuda	Masahiko Yoda	April 4, 1991
54 – 154	"Mymble's Diamond" (ミムラに贈り物 Mimura ni Okurimono)	Mymble finds a huge diamond and is determined to wear it every day. But a jealous Mrs. Fillyjonk will stop at nothing to make Mymble miserable.	Mymble's Diamond	Shōzo Matsuda	Hideyuki Motohashi	April 18, 1991
55 – 155	"Moominpappa's Second Youth" (寂しそうなパパ Sabishisōna Papa)	Moomin Pappa becomes worried when he starts becoming forgetful. He decided to go through a second youth.	Moominpappa and Old Age	Shōzo Matsuda	Masahiro Kitazaki; Kazuyuki Toshida	April 25, 1991
56 – 156	"The Secret Dish" (旅に出たママ Tabi ni Deta Mama)	After the family becomes bored with Moomin Mamma's cooking she decides to go away on a trip to find ingredients for something new and special to eat. But while she is away the family struggles to cook and are not having decent meals.		Megumi Sugihara	Masateru Kudō	May 2, 1991
57 – 157	"Motherly Love" (フローレンの子育て Furōren no Kosodate)	Two children arrive in Moomin House, seemingly abandoned by their parents. Snokmainden decides to adopt them as her own believing they are nice children, but little does she know they have a very dark mischievous side.	Moomin and the Orphans	Shōzo Matsuda	Sonomi Aramaki	May 9, 1991
58 – 158	"Artists in Moominvalley" (ムーミン谷のコンテスト Mūmindani no Kontesuto)	Following the arrival of a famous artist Moomin Pappa decided to become and artist himself, only to discover he cannot paint as he thought he could. Meanwhile, other artists also arrive and paint pictures for the upcoming art contest.	Artists in Moominvalley	Naoko Miyake	Hideyuki Motohashi	May 16, 1991
59 – 159	"Adventures of Moominpappa: Part 1" (パパの思い出 Papa no Omoide)	While ill in bed Moomin Pappa decided to tell the family of his early adventure as a youth. This begins with his unhappy childhood in an orphanage, followed by his escape and early adventures into the sea.	The Exploits of Moominpappa	Shōzo Matsuda	Masateru Kudō	May 23, 1991
60 – 160	"Terrible Little My" (ミイのいたずら Mī no Itazura)	Little My starts behaving very badly one day and causes all kinds of mayhem. Worst still she seemingly causes Moomin to severely injure his leg which puts a strain on her relation to the Moomins. Can she apologise and regain her relation to the Moomins before things get serious?		Megumi Sugihara	Ken Shintani	May 30, 1991
61 – 161	"Moomin the Fortune-Teller" (ムーミンは天才占い師 Mūmin wa Tensai Uranaishi)	Sniff, obsessed with getting rich, forces Moomin to become a fortune teller in hopes of making enough money for their riches. But things go out of hand when Sniff plays a haunting prank on a customer and angers a ghost.	Moomin And The Brigands	Naoko Miyake	Masahiro Kitazaki; Kazuyuki Toshida	June 6, 1991
62 – 162	"Witch Walking" (魔法の言葉 Mahō no Kotoba)	Alicia has started to become a real witch and is able to walk on water and Snork attempts to replicate this scientifically by creating wooden shoes to float on water. But things do not go according to plan until Little My proves she is the only one light enough to float on the water.		Akira Miyazaki	Hideyuki Motohashi	June 13, 1991
63 – 163	"Adventures of Moominpappa: Part 2" (オーケストラ号の冒険 Ōkesutora-gō no Bōken)	While out on the beach Moomin Pappa continues his story about his youthful adventures at sea, leading to his arrival on an island where he builds a house of his own.	The Exploits of Moominpappa	Shōzo Matsuda	Sonomi Aramaki	June 20, 1991
64 – 164	"Moomin and the Birds" (巣立ちの日 Sudachi no Hi)	Moomin and his friends rescue some baby birds and their mother from a predator kite. While the mother is recovering from her injury she struggles to feed the baby birds who refuse to take food from strangers.		Nobuaki Kishima	Masateru Kudō	July 4, 1991
65 – 165	"The Fancy-Dress Ball" (ムーミンの秘密 Mūmin no Himitsu)	A fancy dress ball is announced and everyone attempts to prepare for it, except Moomin who is secretly caught up in his own project.	Snorkmaiden Goes Rococo	Naoko Miyake	Hideyuki Motohashi	July 11, 1991
66 – 166	"The Vampire" (ムーミン谷の吸血鬼 Mūmindani no Kyūketsuki)	A vampire escapes from the zoo and everyone desperately attempt to keep themselves protected. Then the Moomins find a friendly creature in the kitchen who looks like the vampire.	Moomin and the Vampire	Akira Miyazaki	Masahiko Yoda	July 18, 1991
67 – 167	"The Chair" (壊れたパパの大事な椅子 Kowareta Papa no Daiji na Isu)	Moomin Pappa accidentally breaks his old swivel chair and is unable to write without it. When Moomin also accidentally breaks it further he decides to help him fix it.		Megumi Sugihara	Masahiro Kitazaki; Kazuyuki Toshida	July 25, 1991
68 – 168	"Adventures of Moominpappa: Part 3" (ママと運命の出会い Mama to Unmei no Deai)	Moomin Pappa finally reveals the last part of his story as a youth, including his life of the island and his meeting with Moomin Mamma.	The Exploits of Moominpappa	Shōzo Matsuda	Masateru Kudō	August 1, 1991
69 – 169	"The Phoenix" (伝説の不死鳥の危機 Densetsu no Fushichō no Kiki)	A strange bird, known as the Phoenix, arrives in Moomin Valley, injured by some hunters. When Alicia is able to understand its request everybody instantly make a huge bonfire to help the phoenix heal and regenerate from its injury.		Akira Miyazaki	Kazuaki Mōri	August 8, 1991
70 – 170	"Moomin's Big Fish" (お魚パーティーで仲直り Osakana Pātī de Nakanaori)	While fishing with his friends Moomin catches a huge fish which the rest the family decided to hold a party to celebrate. Meanwhile, Snormaiden has a fallout with Snork due to him carelessly using her kitchen to make his newly invented glue. Can the Moomins help the Snorks reconcile?		Megumi Sugihara	Masahiko Yoda	August 15, 1991
71 – 171	"The Slug-a-Bed Mushrooms" (光るキノコの正体 Hikaru Kinoko no Shōtai)	The Moomins discover some mysterious glowing mushrooms in the forest which no one can identify. Worst still they appear to contain sours that make people fall asleep and Moomin Pappa plans to destroy them once and for all.		Nobuaki Kishima	Masateru Kudō	August 22, 1991
72 – 172	"Moomin and the Dolphins" (ムーミンとイルカの友情 Mūmin to Iruka no Yūjō)	Moomin and Snufkin rescue a stranded dolphin on the beach. The following year the dolphin returns and is eager to show Moomin the bottom of the sea, but Moomin cannot breathe underwater long enough. What can he do?	Moomin and the Mermaid	Akira Miyazaki	Sonomi Aramaki	August 29, 1991
73 – 173	"Moomin and the Cave" (ムーミン探検隊 Mūmin Tankentai)	Moomin and his friends set out to explore a circle island on the seashore. Meanwhile, Sniff discovers a cave filled with amethysts and is determined to collect as many as possible. While the others struggle to find him the tide comes in leaving them stranded on the island. Can they be saved?		Nobuaki Kishima	Masahiko Yoda	September 5, 1991
74 – 174	"The Wonderful Present" (歌う花のプレゼント Utau Hana no Purezento)	Thingumy and Bob return to Moomin Valley with a wonderful present for the Moomins. But the present doesn't seem to be what they expected.		Akira Miyazaki	Masateru Kudō	September 12, 1991
75 – 175	"The Fabulous Emerald" (ムーミンのすてきな夢 Mūmin no Suteki na Yume)	Moomin and Snufkin venture into the Lonley Mountains and discover an enormous emerald, deep behind a waterfall. Later after a hailstone storm destroys Mr Hemulen's garden the Moomins struggle to find a way to restore it.		Akira Miyazaki	Ken Shintani	September 19, 1991
76 – 176	"Painting a House" (こわれたおうち Kowareta Ouchi)	Moomin and his friends re-decorate Mr Hemulen's house, but he doesn't seem to like it very much, resulting in him not being able to sleep at night. The Moomins wonder what to do to help Mr Hemulen.		Megumi Sugihara	Masahiko Yoda	September 26, 1991
77 – 177	"The Great Race" (完成!空飛ぶ船 Kansei! Sora Tobu Fune)	Snork finally finishes his new flying ship but has trouble getting it off the ground. Meanwhile, Mr Brisk returns in his hot air balloon and challenges the witch to a race.		Akira Miyazaki	Masateru Kudō	October 3, 1991
78 – 178	"Going South" (ムーミン大空へ Mūmin Ōzora e)	After finally getting the flying ship into the air Snork is giving everyone exciting rides in his ship, except Alicia who is forbidden from riding it by her grandmother, due to her being a witch. Meanwhile, Snork plans to go south on his ship for the winter and Moomin learns how to fly the ship. After a successful lesson, Moomin is eager to give his friends and family a ride. Later the Moomins start to prepare for the winter with Snork, Alicia, her grandmother and Snufkin heading South.		Akira Miyazaki	Masahiko Yoda	October 3, 1991

=== Season 2 (Delightful Moomin Family: Adventure Diary) ===
#	Title	Based on	Writer	Animation director	Original airdate
79 – 201	"The Ring on a Finger" (ムーミンが結婚!? Mūmin ga Kekkon!?)	Moomin Engagement	Akira Shiramizu	Kazuaki Mōri	October 10, 1991
80 – 202	"The Girl With Birds" (スニフの恋 Sunifu no Koi)	Sniff Falls in Love	Masaaki Sakurai	Jōji Kikuchi	October 17, 1991
81 – 203	"A Wind of Freedom" (新しい生き方のすすめ Atarashii Ikikata no Susume)	Moomin Begins a New Life	Masaaki Sakurai	Unknown	October 24, 1991
82 – 204	"Caring Aunt" (世話好きなおばさん Sewazuki na Obasan)		Hiroko Naka	Jōji Kikuchi	October 31, 1991
83 – 205	"A Real Gold Mine" (金色のしっぽ Kin'iro no Shippo)	Moomin and the Golden Tail	Fuyunori Gobu	Kazuaki Mōri; Ken Shintani (?)	November 7, 1991
84 – 206	"Sand Sculptures" (ムーミン谷の彫刻展 Mūmindani no Chōkokuten)		Hiroko Naka	Jōji Kikuchi	November 14, 1991
85 – 207	"The Beach" (僕らの浜辺をかえして Bokura no Hamabe o Kaeshite)		Masaaki Sakurai	Atsushi Toba	November 21, 1991
86 – 208	"A Bothersome Nephew" (署長さんの悩み Shōchō-san no Nayami)	The Inspector's Nephew	Fuyunori Gobu	Jōji Kikuchi	November 28, 1991
87 – 209	"The Time Travel Machine" (ご先祖様で大さわぎ Gosenzo-sama de Ōsawagi)	Moomin Goes Wild West	Fuyunori Gobu	Jōji Kikuchi	December 5, 1991
88 – 210	"The Circle of Secrets" (チン入者で大騒動 Chinnyūsha de Ōsōdō)	Moomin Winter	Hiroko Naka	Jōji Kikuchi	December 12, 1991
89 – 211	"The Dragon" (からの招待状 Kara no Shōtaijō)	Moomin and Aunt Jane/Moomin Christmas	Kazumi Koide	Jōji Kikuchi	December 19, 1991
90 – 212	"The Desert" (タイムマシーンふたたび発動 Taimumashīn Futatabi Hatsudō)	Moomins in Ancient Egypt	Masaaki Sakurai	Kazuaki Mōri	January 1, 1992
91 – 213	"Queen Cleothystra" (女王陛下とドッキンコ Joō Heika to Dokkinko)	Moomins in Ancient Egypt	Masaaki Sakurai	Rie Nishino	January 1, 1992
92 – 214	"The Treasure Map" (ニョロニョロがぞろぞろ Nyoro Nyoro ga Zoro Zoro)		Keiji Terui	Jōji Kikuchi	January 9, 1992
93 – 215	"A Sniff at Everything" (便利屋さんはコーリゴリ Benriya-san wa Kōrigori)	Sniff Goes Good	Kazumi Koide	Masatoshi Fukuyama	January 16, 1992
94 – 216	"Funny Disguises" (ムーミンが大変身 Mūmin ga Daihenshin)		Akira Shiramizu	Jōji Kikuchi	January 23, 1992
95 – 217	"Moomin in Cowboy Country" (ムーミン西部に行く Mūmin Seibu ni Iku)	Moomin Goes Wild West	Masaaki Sakurai	Jōji Kikuchi	January 30, 1992
96 – 218	"Moominson Crusoe" (ムーミン一家漂流記 Mūmin Ikka Hyōryūki)	Moomin Family Robinson	Fuyunori Gobu	Kazuaki Mōri	February 6, 1992
97 – 219	"Hidden love of Little My" (ミィが恋わずらい? Mī ga Koiwazurai?)		Hiroko Naka	Rie Nishino	February 13, 1992
98 – 220	"Tears of the Dragon" (竜の涙を捜せ! Ryū no Namida o Sagase!)	Moomin and the Mermaid	Masaaki Sakurai	Jōji Kikuchi	February 20, 1992
99 – 221	"Chouca Lisa" (ムーミンルネッサンスへ行く Mūmin Runessansu e Iku)		Akira Shiramizu	Masatoshi Fukuyama	February 27, 1992
100 – 222	"The Night of the Red Moon" (お月様が落っこちる?! Otsuki-sama ga Okkochiru?!)		Fuyunori Gobu	Kazuaki Mōri	March 5, 1992
101 – 223	"Return to Childhood" (パパのいたずら大作戦 Papa no Itazura Daisakusen)	Moominpappa and the Spies	Kazumi Koide	Jōji Kikuchi	March 12, 1992
102 – 224	"The Birthday Surprise" (ミィのやけくそ誕生日 Mī no Yakekuso Tanjōbi)		Fuyunori Gobu	Jōji Kikuchi	March 19, 1992
103 – 225	"The Moomins and the Fake Yeti" (秘密の薬を捜せ! Himitsu no Kusuri o Sagase!)		Masaaki Sakurai	Rie Nishino	March 26, 1992
104 – 226	"The Starry Voyage" (笑顔の戻ったムーミン谷 Egao no Modotta Mūmindani)		Masaaki Sakurai	Kazuaki Mōri	March 26, 1992
