= Comet in Moominland (film) =

1992 Japanese animated film

Comet in Moominland ムーミン谷の彗星
- The cover of film's Japanese DVD release
- Directed by: Hiroshi Saitô
- Written by: Akira Miyazaki
- Based on: Kometjakten by Tove Jansson
- Produced by: Kazuo Tabata; Dennis Livson; Päivi Moore
- Starring: Minami Takayama; Ryūsei Nakao; Rei Sakuma; Takehito Koyasu; Akio Ōtsuka; Ikuko Tani; Mika Kanai
- Edited by: Seiji Morita
- Music by: Sumio Shiratori (Japanese version); Pierre Kartner (International version)
- Production companies: Telecable Benelux B.V. Telescreen Japan
- Distributed by: Shochiku (Japan)
- Release dates: August 8, 1992 (Japan); April 2, 1993 (Netherlands)
- Running time: 68 minutes; 78 minutes (Director's cut)
- Countries: Japan; Netherlands
- Languages: Dutch; Japanese

Comet in Moominland (Note: Japanese: ムーミン谷の彗星, Hepburn: Mūmindani no Suisei) is a Dutch-Japanese anime film by Telecable Benelux B.V. The film is based on the novel of the same name by Finnish illustrator and writer Tove Jansson, originally published in Swedish. It was the first full-length Moomin film, and serves as a prequel to the 1990 anime series Moomin, introducing characters that would later appear in the series. It was released in Japan first theatrically on August 8, 1992, as a triple-feature with two unrelated shorter films, and was later released on home video with 10 minutes of extra footage.

The original Japanese release of the film was scored by Sumio Shiratori, re-using compositions that were created for the anime series. In addition, he composed two new opening and ending songs for the film—"Shiawase no morugaane" and "Kono uchuu he, tsutae tai", respectively, both sung by Emiko Shiratori. The international version of the film featured a new musical score composed by Pierre Kartner.

The film was later released in Europe, and has been dubbed to several European languages. It was the seventh most watched film in Finland during the 1992/1993 season with 166,738 viewers.

In 2020, the film was planned to be re-released theatrically to coincide with the 75th anniversary of the Moomin franchise. This version of the film is remastered in 4K, and includes a reworked soundtrack and newly recorded voice acting. The film's re-release was halted indefinitely as a result of the COVID-19 pandemic, with it eventually being released in September 2023. The film's streaming and television rights have been acquired by C More and MTV.

== Plot ==
Before the events of the film, Moomin's father had finished building Moominhouse. During one rainy evening, the Muskrat suddenly appears at the front door to stay because his riverbank home had been destroyed by Moominpappa's bridge, built earlier that day. The next day, the rain's turned everything black and according to Muskrat, it is soot from outer space. He believes that a threat is coming from space and nothing can be done. Moominpappa gets an idea about the astronomical observatory in the Lonely Mountains, where a telescope can see far into space. The next morning, on their way, the trio meets Snufkin for the first time, who has heard about a comet that could crash to Earth at any time. He joins the group, and they climb the steep mountains towards the observatory. On the way, Moomin finds a golden anklet, which Snufkin knows belongs to the Snorkmaiden.

They arrive at the observatory, where they discover that the comet will be colliding in two days. On the way back home, Moomin saves the Snorkmaiden from a giant carnivorous plant, and they immediately fall in love with each other. Both Snorks join the group while they try to reach Moominvalley before the comet. Two days later, Moomin and friends meet the Hemulen and when a hurricane strikes them, they all fly to the Moominhouse with Snufkin's tent. Back home, they all decide to move to a cave Sniff had found for shelter. Sniff is lost during the move when he sees a kitten and begins to follow it with a piece of cake. When there are only minutes left to the expected moment of the comet impact, Moomin and Snufkin find Sniff, who is paralyzed with fear, and they carry him into the cave at the last minute. The comet almost crashes into Earth, but suddenly changes its course and turns away.

The next morning, the sea returns and the characters celebrate on the beach, where Moomin gives Snorkmaiden a pearl he had found.

== Cast ==
Role	Voice actors						
Role	Japanese	English	Finnish	Swedish	Finnish (2023)	Swedish (2023)	Japanese (2022)
Moomin	Minami Takayama	Sarah Huaser	Rabbe Smedlund	Sixten Lundberg	Joonathan Kettunen	Christoffer Strandberg	
Moominpappa	Akio Ohtsuka	David Bridges	Matti Ruohola	Johan Simberg	Carl-Kristian Rundman	Carl-Kristian Rundman	
Moominmamma	Ikuko Tani	Ali Levitch	Ulla Tapaninen	Margit Lindeman	Kristiina Halttu	Maria Sid	
Little My	Rei Sakuma	Andrea Kwan	Elina Salo	Lilli Sukula-Lindblom	Sarika Lipasti	Saga Sarkola	
Sniff	Ryusei Nakao	David Mckinney	Jyrki Kovaleff	Riko Eklundh	Tuomas Uusitalo	Andreas af Enehielm	
Snufkin	Takehito Koyasu	Michael Pizzutto	Pertti Koivula	Michel Budsko	Markus Niemi	Lasse Mellberg	
Snorkmaiden	Mika Kanai	Kate Baldwin	Misa Palander	Ragni Grönblom	Heljä Heikkinen	Alma Pöysti	
Snork	Yasuyuki Hirata	David Bridges	Ilkka Merivaara	Dick Idman	Antti LJ Pääkkönen	Oskar Pöysti	
Hemulen	Minoru Yada	David Bridges	Tapio Hämäläinen	Peik Stenberg	Jarmo Koski	Max Forsman	
The Muskrat	Masato Yamanouchi	Victor Lee	Markku Huhtamo	Dick Idman	Ilkka Heiskanen	Sixten Lundberg	
The Mymble	Yūko Kobayashi	Ali Levitch	Leena Uotila	Vivi-Ann Sjögren	Mirjami Heikkinen	Hellen Willberg	
Fillyjonk	Sumi Shimamoto		Leena Uotila	Chris af Enehielm	Hanna Kaila	Nina Hukkinen	
Police Officer	Takaya Hashi		Tapio Hämäläinen	Samuel Huber	Petri Hanttu	Pekka Strang	
Fubble	Ryuuzou Ishino	David Bridges	Leena Uotila	Dick Idman	Hanna Kaila	Nina Palmgren	
Astronomers	Fumihiko Tachiki; Kazumi Ikeda		Markku Huhtamo; Pertti Koivula	Peik Stenberg; Samuel Huber	Petri Hanttu; Markus Bäckman	Petri Hanttu; Markus Bäckman	

An English dub of the film was released on the German DVD titled Die Mumins – Der Komet im Muminland. The English dub was produced by Hoek & Sonépouse/Eskimo and distributed by Telescreen Distribution, rather than Eco Studios and Maverick Entertainment respectively like with the English dub for the series. As a result, none of the English actors from the series reprise their roles.

== Release ==
The film premiered in Japan on August 8, 1992, and in Finland on April 2, 1993. In 1993, Comet in Moominland was the seventh most watched film in Finland with 166,738 viewers. In total, the film attracted 176,413 viewers in Finland.

The film has been released on VHS and DVD. In addition to the Finnish version, the original Finnish DVD contains a Swedish version, as well as a Finnish version with Sámi subtitles. In 2012, VL-Media released new editions of the film, which included a Swedish version in addition to the Finnish version, as well as a Finnish version with Sámi subtitles. The film was included in the Blu-Ray box set for the Moomin anime series, which was released in Japan in 2012.

In 2018, the film was re-released on DVD, which was remastered digitally. At the time, the film had not been re-recorded in Finnish by the current voice actors who voiced the characters in the Moominvalley television series, so the new DVD release also included the original version of the film. However, unlike previous DVD releases, the new release does not include other language options or subtitles.

The 4K remastered version of the film was originally slated for release in September 2020. The re-release was then rescheduled to April 2022, before being delayed indefinitely as a result of the COVID-19 pandemic. After three years of delays, the renewed version of the film was released on September 15, 2023, 30 years after the film's original premiere in Finland.

== See also ==
- Comet in Moominland
- Moomins and the Comet Chase
