= Shiratori =

Shiratori (白鳥) is a Japanese surname that literally translates to "white bird", which is the word for swan in Japanese. Notable people with this surname include:

- Chieko Shiratori (白鳥 智恵子; born 1975), actress
- Emiko Shiratori (白鳥 英美子; born 1950), singer and songwriter
- Hitomi Shiratori (白鳥 瞳), one of the stage names used by musician Yoshiki (林 佳樹; born 1965)
- Kanemaru Shiratori (白鳥 金丸; born 1942), boxer
- Katsuhiro Shiratori (白鳥 勝浩; born 1976), beach volleyball player
- Shiratori Kurakichi (白鳥 庫吉; 1865–1942), historian and Sinologist
- Sumio Shiratori (白鳥 澄夫), composer and music producer
- Tetsu Shiratori (白鳥 哲; born 1972), voice actor
- Toshio Shiratori (白鳥 敏夫; 1887–1949), Japanese ambassador to Italy 1938–1940
- Yoshie Shiratori (白鳥 由栄; 1907–1979), felon and anti-hero who escaped from Japanese prison four times
- Yuri Shiratori (白鳥 由里; born 1968), voice actress and J-pop singer
- Yuriko Shiratori (白鳥 百合子; born 1983), gravure idol, tarento artist and actress

== Fictional characters ==
- Aira Shiratori, a character of Dandadan
- Azusa Shiratori, a character of Ranma ½
- The Shiratori sisters, characters in the 2007 rhythm video game Moero! Nekketsu Rhythm Damashii Osu! Tatakae! Ouendan 2

== See also ==
- Shinano-Shiratori Station
- Shirati
- Sirtori
