= Moomin comic strips =

Comic strip created by Finnish author Tove Jansson and cartoonist Lars Jansson

Moomin
- Author(s): Tove Jansson; Lars Jansson
- Current status/schedule: Ended
- Launch date: 1947
- Syndicate(s): Ny Tid (1947-1948); Evening News (1954-1975)
- Publisher: Associated Newspapers
- Genre(s): Humour, satire

Moomin (Swedish: Mumin / Mumintrollen; Finnish: Muumipeikko) is a comic strip created by Swedish-speaking Finnish writer and artist Tove Jansson, and followed up by her younger brother Lars Jansson, featuring their Moomin family of characters. The first comic strip, entitled Mumintrollet och jordens undergång (Moomintroll and The End of The World) was for the Finland newspaper Ny Tid. It was written between 1947 and 1948, at the request of the editor, a friend of Jansson's, Atos Wirtanen. The series was mainly an adaptation of Comet in Moominland.

The main series of Moomin comic strips was made directly for the British market: they were distributed by the Associated Newspapers comic strip syndicate, initially appearing in London's Evening News newspaper. The series was printed in newspapers from 1954 to 1971. At its peak, Moomin appeared in around 40 countries and some 120 newspapers, with over 20 million readers daily.

The original comic strip stories by Tove Jansson and Lars Jansson have been adapted into the Moomin (1990) anime series and the 2014 animated film based on Moomin on the Riviera comic strip story.

Tove and Lars Jansson received the Finnish Comics Society's Puupää's Hat award in 1980.

== History ==
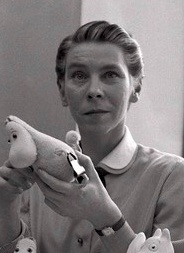
Tove Jansson, 1956

In 1947, Tove Jansson's lover, the politician Atos Wirtanen, commissioned her first Moomin comic strip for Finland's Ny Tid newspaper, where he was an editor. The series has been reprinted in book form under the name Jorden går under (The World is Ending).

A much bigger opportunity arose when Charles Sutton, the leader of the Associated Newspapers syndicate, contacted Jansson in 1952 about a comic strip of the "charming" Moomins. After much discussion, and a planned launch in the Daily Sketch, Jansson travelled to London to arrange the launch in Evening News, with 6 episodes per week, "each strip to last three months". It was the largest afternoon newspaper in the world at the time, with a circulation of 12 million, and started to publish the Moomin comic strip on 20 September 1954. According to Jansson's biographer Boel Westin, it was a "smash hit". The strip was quickly sold to other countries, especially in Scandinavia. In 1955, the strip started in Finland's Ilta-Sanomat, in Sweden's daily Svenska Dagbladet, and in the Danish Politiken. The comic strips, unlike the early Moomin books and her drawing work, began to provide her with a sufficient income. Tove's brother Lars Jansson helped with the work: he began by helping to translate the comic strips into English, then started to help create scripts in 1957, and finally took over the entire process by 1960. At its peak, Moomin appeared in around 40 countries and some 120 newspapers, with over 20 million readers daily. It continued running until 1971.

In the 1990s, a comic book version of Moomin was produced in Scandinavia after Dennis Livson and Lars Jansson's Moomin animated series was shown on television. The Janssons had no involvement in these comic books. However, in the wake of the comic book's success, two new Moomin comic strips were launched under the artistic and content oversight of Lars and his daughter, Sophia Jansson-Zambra. As of 2007, Sophia provides sole oversight for the strips.

== Analysis ==
Tove and Lars Jansson "delightful[ly]" enlivened the strips by making some panel boundaries scenic elements that relate to the strip's theme, as here in the 1958 strip Moomin and the Comet when Stinky comes by, and an unhappy flower and a smelly dead fish act as boundaries.

Laura Honkasalo, reporting on the first seminar on the Moomin comic strips (held in August 2000) in Kulttuurivihkot, noted that they use a warm humour, not laughing at anyone's expense, and that the humour relies on slow narrative. She notes Juhani Tolvanen's analysis that Lars Jansson's drawing is technically skilful and innovative, such as with thematic panel boundaries. Moomin.com notes that the vertical boundaries between the comic strip panels are not always just lines: Tove and Lars Jansson sometimes "delightful[ly]" enlivened the strips by making the boundaries scenic elements such as doors, ropes, curtains, or trees.

Juhani Sirén in City magazine notes that while the comic strips were not allowed to include sex, Moomintroll tries drugs; Moominpappa drinks whisky and gets a hangover; there is a parody of excessive publicity; modern art and its pundits are mocked; and Moomintroll is warned of the dangers of gurus.

== Honours and distinctions ==
Tove and Lars Jansson received the Finnish Comics Society's Puupäähattu ("Puupää's hat") award in 1980.

== Adaptations ==
=== Anime ===
The Moomin (1990) anime series featured several episodes, which are loose adaptations based on comic strip stories, while several characters from the comic strips appear in the anime series. The second season, known as sequel anime series Delightful Moomin Family: Adventure Diary (楽しいムーミン一家 冒険日記, Tanoshii Mūmin Ikka: Bōken Nikki) in Japan, was like the first series directed by Hiroshi Saitô and Masayuki Kojima. It was dubbed into Finnish but not English.

=== Animated film ===
The 2014 traditional animated comedy film Moomins on the Riviera directed by Xavier Picard and produced by Hanna Hemilä, is based on the comic strip story of the same name; it was released on 10 October 2014 in Finland to celebrate the 100th anniversary of Tove Jansson's birth. The film broadly follows the original comic strip story, with some elements from other comic strip stories and several of Jansson's Moomin characters who didn't appear in the original story, such as Little My and Snufkin.

== List of comic strip stories ==
The strip was divided into episodes, each with distinct titles and storylines.

Number	English name	Swedish name	Finnish name	Creator(s)	Year of appearance	Publication notes
0.	Moomintroll and the End of the World	Mumintrollet och jordens undergång	Muumipeikko ja maailmanloppu	Tove	July 2, 1948	Originally published in Ny Tid.
1.	Moomin and the Brigands	Mumintrollet	Muumipeikko	Tove	July 7, 1954	Originally published in The Evening News. Reprinted in Drawn & Quarterly's Moomin Vol.1 (2006) ISBN 9781894937801
2.	Moomin and Family Life	Muminfamiljen	Muumiperhe	Tove	January 19, 1955	Originally published in The Evening News. Reprinted in Drawn & Quarterly's Moomin Vol.1 (2006) ISBN 9781894937801
3.	Moomin on the Riviera	Mumin på Rivieran; Familjen lever högt	Muumiperhe Rivieralla	Tove	February 23, 1955	Originally published in The Evening News. Reprinted in Drawn & Quarterly's Moomin Vol.1 (2006) ISBN 9781894937801
4.	Moomin's Desert Island	Den ensliga ön	Yksinäinen saari	Tove	March 16, 1955	Originally published in The Evening News. Reprinted in Drawn & Quarterly's Moomin Vol.1 (2006) ISBN 9781894937801
5.	Moomin's Winter Follies	Den farliga vintern	Vaarallinen talvi	Tove	June 8, 1955	Originally published in London's The Evening News. Reprinted in D&Q's Moomin Vol.2 (2007) ISBN 9781897299197
6.	Moominmamma's Maid	Låtsaslek	Kuvitteluleikki	Tove	February 22, 1956	Originally published in London's The Evening News. Reprinted in D&Q's Moomin Vol.2 (2007) ISBN 9781897299197
7.	Moomin Builds a House	Mumin bygger ett hus Att bygga ett hus	Talonrakennus	Tove	April 25, 1956	Originally published in London's The Evening News. Reprinted in D&Q's Moomin Vol.2 (2007) ISBN 9781897299197
8.	Moomin Begins a New Life	Mumin börjar ett nytt liv Vi börjar ett nytt liv	Aloitamme uuden elämän	Tove	May 30, 1956	Originally published in London's The Evening News. Reprinted in D&Q's Moomin Vol.2 (2007) ISBN 9781897299197
9.	Moomin Falls in Love	Mumin blir kär Mumintrollet blir förälskat	Muumipeikko rakastuu	Tove	July 18, 1956	Originally published in London's The Evening News. Reprinted in D&Q's Moomin Vol.3 (2008) ISBN 9781897299555
10.	Moomin Valley Turns Jungle	Mumindalen blir djungel Vi bor i en djungel	Viidakkoelämää	Tove	September 5, 1956	Originally published in London's The Evening News. Reprinted in D&Q's Moomin Vol.3 (2008) ISBN 9781897299555
11.	Moomin and the Martians	Mumin och marsmänniskorna Mumintrollet och marsinnevånarna	Muumipeikko ja marsilaiset	Tove	February 27, 1957	Originally published in London's The Evening News. Reprinted in D&Q's Moomin Vol.3 (2008) ISBN 9781897299555
12.	Moomin and the Sea	Mumin och havet Muminfamiljen och havet	Muumiperhe ja meri	Tove	March 13, 1957	Originally published in London's The Evening News. Reprinted in D&Q's Moomin Vol.3 (2008) ISBN 9781897299555
13.	Club Life in Moomin Valley	Föreningsliv i Mumindalen; Föreningsliv	Yhdistyselämää Muumilaaksossa	Tove	April 24, 1957	Originally published in London's The Evening News. Reprinted in D&Q's Moomin Vol.3 (2008) ISBN 9781897299555
14.	Moomin Goes Wild West	Mumintrollet i vilda västern Mumin i Vilda Västern	Muumipeikko villissä lännessä	Tove/Lars	May 1, 1957	Originally published in London's The Evening News. Reprinted in D&Q's Moomin Vol.4 (2009) ISBN 9781897299784
15.	Snorkmaiden Goes Rococo	Snorkfröken i rokoko Snorkfröken i Rococo	Niiskuneiti rokokoossa	Tove/Lars	January 22, 1958	Originally published in London's The Evening News. Reprinted in D&Q's Moomin Vol.4 (2009) ISBN 9781897299784
16.	The Conscientious Moomins	Mumin och medborgarkänslan Mumin blir social	Muumipeikko ja velvollisuudentunto	Tove/Lars	February 12, 1958	Originally published in London's The Evening News. Reprinted in D&Q's Moomin Vol.4 (2009) ISBN 9781897299784
17.	Moomin and the Comet	Mumin och kometen	Muumipeikko ja pyrstötähti	Tove/Lars	April 9, 1958	Originally published in London's The Evening News. Reprinted in D&Q's Moomin Vol.4 (2009) ISBN 9781897299784
18.	Moomin and the Golden Tail	Mumin och den gyllene svansen Den gyllene svansen	Muumipeikko ja kultainen häntä	Tove	May 7, 1958	Originally published in London's The Evening News. Reprinted in D&Q's Moomin Vol.4 (2009) ISBN 9781897299784
19.	Moomin Winter	Muminvinter	Muumitalvi	Tove/Lars	January 21, 1959	Originally published in London's The Evening News. Reprinted in D&Q's Moomin Vol.5 (2010) ISBN 9781897299944
20.	Moomin under Sail	Mumin till sjöss	Muumipeikko merillä	Tove/Lars	February 11, 1959	Originally published in London's The Evening News. Reprinted in D&Q's Moomin Vol.5 (2010) ISBN 9781897299944
21.	Fuddler's Courtship	Klåttdjurets frieri	Hosulin kosinta	Tove/Lars	March 18, 1959	Originally published in London's The Evening News. Reprinted in D&Q's Moomin Vol.5 (2010) ISBN 9781897299944
22.	Moomin's Lamp	Mumins lampa	Muumin lamppu	Lars	February 3, 1960	Originally published in London's The Evening News. Reprinted in D&Q's Moomin Vol. 6 (2011) ISBN 9781770460423
23.	Moomin and the Railway	Mumin och järnvägen	Muumipeikko ja rautatie	Lars	1960	Originally published in London's The Evening News. Reprinted in D&Q's Moomin Vol. 6 (2011) ISBN 9781770460423
24.	Moominpappa and the Spies	Muminpappa och spionerna	Muumipappa ja vakoojat	Lars	1960	Originally published in London's The Evening News. Reprinted in D&Q's Moomin Vol. 6 (2011) ISBN 9781770460423
25.	Moomin and the Circus	Mumin och cirkusen	Muumipeikko ja sirkus	Lars	1960	Originally published in London's The Evening News. Reprinted in D&Q's Moomin Vol. 6 (2011) ISBN 9781770460423
26.	Moomin the Colonist	Mumin Nybyggaren	Muumit uudisasukkaina	Lars	1961	Originally published in London's The Evening News. Reprinted in D&Q's Moomin Vol. 7 (2012) ISBN 9781770460621
27.	Moomin and the Scouts	Mumin och scouterna	Muumipeikko ja partiolaiset	Lars	1961	Originally published in London's The Evening News. Reprinted in D&Q's Moomin Vol. 7 (2012) ISBN 9781770460621
28.	Moomin and the Farm	Mumin brukar jorden	Muumipeikko maanviljelijänä	Lars	1961	Originally published in London's The Evening News. Reprinted in D&Q's Moomin Vol. 7 (2012) ISBN 9781770460621
29.	Moomin and the Goldfields	Mumin och guldgrävarna	Muumipeikko kullankaivajana	Lars	1961	Originally published in London's The Evening News. Reprinted in D&Q's Moomin Vol. 7 (2012) ISBN 9781770460621
30.	Moomin Family Robinson	Robinson Mumin	Robinson Muumi	Lars	1962	Originally published in London's The Evening News. Reprinted in D&Q's Moomin Vol. 8 (2013) ISBN 9781770461215
31.	Artists in Moominvalley	Mumin och konsten	Muumipeikko ja taide	Lars	1962	Originally published in London's The Evening News. Reprinted in D&Q's Moomin Vol. 8 (2013) ISBN 9781770461215
32.	Sniff's Holiday Camp	Sniff's badort	Nipsun kylpylä	Lars	1962	Originally published in London's The Evening News. Reprinted in D&Q's Moomin Vol. 8 (2013) ISBN 9781770461215
33.	The Inspector's Nephew	Polismästarens brorson	Poliisimestarin veljenpoika	Lars	1962	Originally published in London's The Evening News. Reprinted in D&Q's Moomin Vol. 8 (2013) ISBN 9781770461215
34.	Damsel in Distress	Dam i dilemma	Neitonen ahdingossa	Lars	1963	Originally published in London's The Evening News. Reprinted in D&Q's Moomin Vol.9 (2014) ISBN 9781770461574
35.	Fuddler and Married Life	Knappar och äktenskap	Nappeja ja avioliittoja	Lars	1963	Originally published in London's The Evening News. Reprinted in D&Q's Moomin Vol.9 (2014) ISBN 9781770461574
36.	Sniff's Sport Shop	Sniff's sportshop Sniffs sportaffär	Nipsun urheiluliike	Lars	1963	Originally published in London's The Evening News. Reprinted in D&Q's Moomin Vol.9 (2014) ISBN 9781770461574
37.	Mymble's Diamond	Mymlans diamant	Mymmelin timantti	Lars	1963	Originally published in London's The Evening News. Reprinted in D&Q's Moomin Vol.9 (2014) ISBN 9781770461574
38.	Moomin and the Vampire	Mumin och vampyren	Muumit ja vampyyri	Lars	1964	Originally published in London's The Evening News. Reprinted in D&Q's Moomin Vol.10 (August 2015) ISBN 9781770462021
39.	Moomin and the TV	Mumin och TV	Muumipeikko ja televisio	Lars	1964	Originally published in London's The Evening News. Reprinted in D&Q's Moomin Vol.10 (August 2015) ISBN 9781770462021
40.	The Underdeveloped Moomins	De underutvecklade mumintrollen	Alikehittyneet muumit	Lars	1964	Originally published in London's The Evening News. Reprinted in D&Q's Moomin Vol.10 (August 2015) ISBN 9781770462021
41.	Moomin and Aunt Jane	Mumin och moster	Muumipeikko ja täti	Lars	1964	Originally published in London's The Evening News. Reprinted in D&Q's Moomin Vol.10 (August 2015) ISBN 9781770462021
42.	Moomin and the National Park	Mumin och naturparken	Muumit ja luonnonpuisto	Lars	1965	Originally published in London's The Evening News.
43.	Moomin and the Good Old Days	Mumin och den Gamla Goda Tiden; Den gamla goda tiden	Muumipeikko ja vanhat hyvät ajat	Lars	1965	Originally published in London's The Evening News.
44.	Moomin's Pet	Hundliv i Mumindalen	Koiranelämää Muumilaaksossa	Lars	1965	Originally published in London's The Evening News.
45.	Moomin the Private Eye	Mumin detektiven	Muumisalapoliisi	Lars	1966	Originally published in London's The Evening News.
46.	Spring in Moomin Valley	Vårkänslor	Kevättunteita	Lars	1966	Originally published in London's The Evening News.
47.	Moomin Rescues a Princess	Mumin räddar en prinsessa	Muumipeikko pelastaa prinsessan	Lars	1966	Originally published in London's The Evening News.
48.	Moomin and Agent 008 ½	Mumin och agent 008½	Muumipeikko ja agentti 008 ½	Lars	1966	Originally published in London's The Evening News.
49.	Moomin Lives Dangerously	Mumin lever farligt	Muumipeikon vaarallinen elämä	Lars	1967	Originally published in London's The Evening News.
50.	Moomins in Torrellorca	Mumin på Torrelorca	Muumit Torrelorcalla	Lars	1967	Originally published in London's The Evening News.
51.	Snorkmaiden Crashes Society	Snorkfröken i societeten	Niiskuneiti seurapiireissä	Lars	1967	Originally published in London's The Evening News.
52.	Moomins in Ancient Greece	Redan de gamla grekerna	Jo muinaiset kreikkalaiset	Lars	1967	Originally published in London's The Evening News.
53.	Sniff Goes Good	Sniff blir god	Nipsu parantaa tapansa	Lars	1968	Originally published in several newspapers (but not London's The Evening News).
54.	Moomin the Journalist	Redaktör Mumin	Muumipeikko toimittajana	Lars	1968	Originally published in several newspapers (but not London's The Evening News).
55.	Moomin and the Orphans	Mumin och de föräldralösa	Muumipeikko ja orpolapset	Lars	1968	Originally published in several newspapers (but not London's The Evening News).
56.	Sir Moomin	Riddar Mumin	Ritarimuumi	Lars	1969	Originally published in several newspapers (but not London's The Evening News).
57.	Horsey Moomin	Mumin till häst	Muumipeikko ratsailla	Lars	1969	Originally published in several newspapers (but not London's The Evening News).
58.	Moomin and the Mermaid	Mumin och sjöjungfrun	Muumipeikko ja merenneito	Lars	1969	Originally published in several newspapers (but not London's The Evening News).
59.	Emancipated Moomins	Misans återkomst	Miskan paluu	Lars	1970	Originally published in several newspapers (but not London's The Evening News).
60.	Moomin and the Radicals	Mumin och Radikalerna	Muumipeikko ja radikaalit	Lars	1970	Originally published in several newspapers (but not London's The Evening News).
61.	Moomin Christmas	Mumin-Jul	Muumijoulu	Lars	1970	Originally published in several newspapers (but not London's The Evening News).
62.	Moomin in Ancient Egypt	Mumin i Egypten	Muumipeikko Egyptissä	Lars	1971	Originally published in several newspapers (but not London's The Evening News).
63.	Sniff Falls in Love	Sniff blir kär	Nipsu rakastuu	Lars	1971	Originally published in several newspapers (but not London's The Evening News).
64.	Moomin Engagement	Mumin förlovar sig	Muumipeikon kihlaus	Lars	1971	Originally published in several newspapers (but not London's The Evening News).
65.	Moomin and the Flying Dutchman	Mumin och den flygande Holländaren	Muumipeikko ja Lentävä hollantilainen	Lars	1972	Originally published in several newspapers (but not London's The Evening News).
66.	Snorkmaiden the Seer	Snorkfröken blir synsk	Niiskuneidistä tulee ennustaja	Lars	1972	Originally published in several newspapers (but not London's The Evening News).
67.	Moomin and the Beach	Mumin och badstranden	Muumipeikko ja uimaranta	Lars	1973	Originally published in several newspapers (but not London's The Evening News).
68.	Moomin Gets Rich	Mumin blir rik	Muumipeikko rikastuu	Lars	1973	Originally published in several newspapers (but not London's The Evening News).
69.	Moomin and the Guru	Mumin och Gurun	Muumipeikko ja guru	Lars	1973	Originally published in several newspapers (but not London's The Evening News).
70.	Moominpappa and Old Age	Muminpappan på ålderns brant	Muumipappa vanhuuden porteilla	Lars	1974	Originally published in several newspapers (but not London's The Evening News).
71.	Moomin in Battle	Batalj i Mumindalen	Taistelu Muumilaaksosta	Lars	1974	Originally published in several newspapers (but not London's The Evening News).
72.	Moomin in Neander Valley	Mumin i Neanderdalen	Muumipeikko Neanderthalissa	Lars	1974	Originally published in several newspapers (but not London's The Evening News).
73.	Moomin and the Ten Piggy Banks	Mumin och de tio sparbössorna	Muumipeikko ja kymmenen säästöporsasta	Lars	1975	Originally published in several newspapers (but not London's The Evening News).

== Sources ==
- Tolvanen, Juhani (2000). Muumisisarukset. Tove ja Lars Jansson – Muumipeikko-sarjakuvan tarina [Moomin siblings. Tove and Lars Jansson – The Story of the Moomintroll Comic] (in Finnish). WSOY. ISBN 978-951-0-23633-8.
- Westin, Boel (2014). Tove Jansson Life, Art, Words. Sort of Books. ISBN 978-1-908745-45-3.
