= Moomin (1990 TV series) =

Animated television series

- A screenshot of the series' British English dubbed title, featuring Moominhouse behind the logo.
- Also known as: Delightful Moomin Family (Japanese title – season 1); Delightful Moomin Family: Adventure Diary (Japanese title – season 2); I Mumindalen (Swedish title); Muumilaakson tarinoita (Finnish title); Adventures from Moominvalley (YouTube title)
- Based on: Moomin by Tove Jansson and Lars Jansson
- Story by: Akira Miyazaki (season 1); Masaaki Sakurai (season 2)
- Directed by: Hiroshi Saito (season 1); Masayuki Kojima (season 1) (Note: Credited as Series episode director (シリーズ演出).); Takeyuki Kanda (season 2); Tsuneo Tominaga (season 2)
- Music by: Sumio Shiratori (Japanese); Pierre Kartner (International)
- Countries of origin: Netherlands; Japan; Finland; France; Spain
- No. of seasons: 2
- No. of episodes: 104 (list of episodes)

Production
- Executive producer: Dennis Livson
- Producers: Mutsuo Shimizu; Yuuji Miyashita (season 1); Manabu Tamura (season 1); Shiki Nonaka (season 2); Masao Kodaira (season 2)
- Cinematography: Hisao Shirai (season 1); Sadafumi Sano (season 2)
- Editors: Sachiko Miki (season 1); Seiji Morita (season 1); Chieko Takayama (season 2); Masaki Sakamoto (season 2)
- Running time: 23–24 minutes
- Production companies: Telecable Benelux B.V.; TV Tokyo; Yle; Marina Productions; Televisión Española

Original release
- Network: TXN (TV Tokyo)
- Release: 12 April 1990 – 26 March 1992
- Network: VARA
- Network: Yle TV1
- Release: 1 September 1991 – 1992
- Network: La 2

Related
- Comet in Moominland (1992 film)

Moomin (Note: Known in Japan as Delightful Moomin Family (Japanese: 楽しいムーミン一家, Hepburn: Tanoshii Mūmin Ikka); Swedish: I Mumindalen; Finnish: Muumilaakson tarinoita) is a children's animated television series based on the Moomin novels and comic strips by the Finnish illustrator and author Tove Jansson and her brother Lars Jansson. It was produced by Telecable Benelux B.V. in co-production with TV Tokyo, Yle, Marina Productions, and Televisión Española, and was animated by Teleimage (Note: Teleimage was formerly known by the name Wako Pro, and changed its name back to Wako Pro in 1993.) and Visual 80 (season 1). It was the third anime adaptation of the property and the first to receive distribution in different countries worldwide. The series was first aired on TV Tokyo from 12 April 1990 to 3 October 1991.

Moomin takes place in the peaceful rural land of Moominvalley, where a young Moomin along with his parents Moominpappa and Moominmamma live in Moominhouse. The series follows the many adventures of Moomin and family, together with their friends, around Moominvalley and sometimes outside of it. Most of the stories involve discovering magical objects and creatures, adventures in different locations or dealing with everyday situations. While many episodes are loosely based on the novels and comic strips, the series has its own consistent continuity.

The series helped fuel the "Moomin boom" of the 1990s, including an obsession with Moomin plush toys in Japan. After great success of the series, a sequel called Delightful Moomin Family: Adventure Diary (Note: Japanese: 楽しいムーミン一家 冒険日記, Hepburn: Tanoshii Mūmin Ikka: Bōken Nikki) was produced and aired on TV Tokyo from 10 October 1991, to 26 March 1992. The sequel series aired in several countries outside of Japan, where it was considered another season of Moomin, although it was never dubbed into English. The original series also spawned a theatrical prequel film Comet in Moominland which is based on the second novel of the same name and video games releases.

The series was dubbed into many languages (including, but not limited to Swedish, Finnish, Norwegian, Dutch, Danish, and Spanish) and aired worldwide. In addition, a Northern Sami dub was made by NRK Sámi Radio and aired on NRK 1 in Norway and SVT1 in Sweden alongside the aforementioned Norwegian and Swedish dubs. The series had also been dubbed into English and aired on CBBC in United Kingdom during the same year.

== Plot ==
The Moomin family and friends. From left to right, Snufkin, Little My, Sniff, the Snork Maiden, Moominpappa, Moomin (Moomintroll) and Moominmamma.

The series begins with the arrival of spring in Moominvalley. Moomin, along with Little My, Moominpappa, and Moominmamma, wake up in Moominhouse, while Snufkin also comes back from his south travel on the first day of spring. The first eight episodes create a coherent storyline that is based on the third novel, Finn Family Moomintroll. During the story, Moomin and his friends find out the magical silk hat, that turns out to belong to the Hobgoblin. He later gets his hat back from the Moomin family. The Moomins later find a wrecked boat, fix it and travel to a lonely island which is full of Hattifatteners. Next, two small creatures called Thingumy and Bob with a large suitcase arrive to the Moominhouse, and they are followed by the Groke. After the Moomins manage to evict the Groke from their way by giving her Moomin's seashell, it turns out that Thingumy and Bob are keeping the large "King's Ruby" in their suitcase. After Thingummy and Bob return Moominmamma's missing handbag, the Moomins celebrate the event with a large junket, where suddenly the Hobgoblin also arrives. Finally the problem of the King's Ruby's ownership is solved with the Hobgoblin's magic.

Moomin takes place over a three-year period. Moomin and his family or friends manage to take part in two winter periods through the series, although the Moomins are supposed normally to hibernate. Through the series, Snork, the Snork Maiden's inventor brother, designs and creates two flying ships of different type; the first is destroyed due sabotage and the second one gets finished at the end of the series. Before the second winter period the Moomins and their friends also get to know Alicia and her grandmother, who is a witch. She teaches Alicia to become a real witch and has a negative opinion about the Moomins and their nice nature. As the series goes on, the witch however begins to appreciate them. At the end of the series, Snork decides to go on a journey with his finished flying ship while Alicia and her grandmother also leave the Moominvalley for the third winter period. The series concludes when the winter arrives, the Moomins fall into hibernation and Snufkin travels to the south once again.

== Production ==
Moomin is the third anime adaptation based on the novels and comic strips. Before the production, author Tove Jansson was already displeased with the previous Moomin anime adaptation from 1969 due to how unfaithful the series' characters and stories were to her original source material. Because of this, both of the first Moomin and New Moomin from 1972 were never distributed or aired outside Japan. Since 1981, Finnish animation and commercial producer Dennis Livson began to beg the rights from Tove and Lars Jansson to make another animated adaptation. Eventually, Livson managed to win both of them over after they saw his previous produced animated series Alfred J Kwak, and rights for another series were obtained. A year later in Tokyo, Livson showed a small preview of the anime series for both Tove and Lars Jansson. According to Livson, Tove commented on the animation by saying "Dom lever ju" ("They are really alive!").

Unlike previous two anime adaptations, Moomin was a co-production of Dutch company Telecable Benelux B.V., Japanese TV Tokyo, Finnish Yle, French Marina Productions, and Spanish Televisión Española. It was animated at the Japanese animation studios Teleimage and Visual 80 (season 1). Hiroshi Saitō and Masayuki Kojima were the series' main directors while Akira Miyazaki did the screenplay for the first 12 and many later episodes. Tove and Lars Jansson were also involved with the screenplay by doing certain changes in scripts.

== Differences from the books ==
The series includes plotlines taken from following Moomin books: Finn Family Moomintroll (eight episodes), Moominland Midwinter (three episodes), Moominsummer Madness (three episodes), The Exploits of Moominpappa (three episodes), Moominpappa at Sea (two episodes) and several short stories from the collection Tales from Moominvalley (five episodes in total). Roughly twenty episodes in the original series and dozen more in the sequel series are based on stories taken from Tove and Lars Jansson's Moomin comic strips. The series does have differences from the books and comic strips, more strongly than European stop-motion series The Moomins that aired between 1977 and 1982, but not as much as the previous two anime adaptations. Certain events and characters from the books and comic strips are missing to fit the series' own continuity or for reasons unknown. Many new plotlines and some new characters have been added, especially in the later episodes. Some notable differences include:

- Moomintroll is called simply "Moomin", except in the first episode in the Japanese version, where the narrator introduces him as "Moomintroll".
- Little My appears in the series from the beginning, but appears only in later volumes in the books.
- Lady of the Cold looks very different from the description in the books.
- In the books the Moomins exchange the King's Ruby for the Hobgoblin's top hat and the Hobgoblin later arrives, to collect the King's Ruby, with a new hat. In the series however, Hobgoblin gets his top hat back in the second episode and in the seventh episode the Moomins instead exchange the King's Ruby for a heart-shaped sea-shell Snorkmaiden gave Moomin.
  - Also the wishes are different. In the series Mr Hemulen wishes for a new spade to replace the one he borrowed and broke from MoominPappa. Then Snorkmaiden wishes for eyes like the Wooden Lady and Moomin later wishes them back to normal after she ends up hating them. With the last wish Thingumy and Bob wish for a ruby just like the Hobgoblin's. In the book, Mamma wishes for Moomin to not miss Snufkin being gone, and Moomin wishes for some of the party's food to go to Snufkin.
- A Fillyjonk raises Moominpappa in the orphanage in the series, while in the books it's a Hemulen who raises him.
- Snorkmaiden and Sniff who disappear occasionally in the book series have bigger roles in the TV series and they appear quite often throughout the series.
- Snufkin takes a friendly attitude towards people who are not in the Moomin family. He doesn't smoke a pipe in the series.
- Snork appears regularly and he's portrayed as a scientist and inventor whereas in the books he's a very minor character who mainly tries to solve varying problems with systematic approach. Snork's fixation with flying is not based on the books.
- Alicia and her grandmother (the witch) are characters who were invented for the series, they did not exist in the books or comic strips.

== Cast and characters ==
Cast members of the Swedish dub were exclusively Swedish-speaking Finns (Finland-Swedes). Finland-Swedish actors are generally cast as the Moomins in Swedish productions and localizations because Tove Jansson was a Swedish-speaking Finn. The Japanese, Italian, Finnish and Swedish dubs used a female narrator to give the impression that the show was narrated by Jansson herself.

Character	English actor	Japanese actor	Finnish actor (1991)	Finnish actor (2017)	Finland Swedish actor (1991)
Narrator	Garrick Hagon (episodes 1–26), Peter Marinker (episodes 27–78)	Emiko Shiratori	Leena Uotila	Carla Rindell	Vivi-Ann Sjögren
Moomintroll	Susan Sheridan	Minami Takayama	Rabbe Smedlund	Aksu Palmén	Sixten Lundberg
Moominmamma	Pat Starr	Ikuko Tani	Ulla Tapaninen	Katja Aakkula	Margit Lindeman
Moominpappa	Peter Whitman (episodes 1–47), William Roberts (episodes 48–78)	Akio Ōtsuka	Matti Ruohola	Juha Varis	Johan Simberg
Snufkin	John Chancer	Takehito Koyasu	Timo Torikka	Ilkka Villi	Michel Budsko
Little My	Toni Barry	Rei Sakuma	Elina Salo	Karolina Blom	Lilli Sukula-Lindblom
Snorkmaiden (also known as Floren in the Japanese dub)	Toni Barry	Mika Kanai	Aila Svedberg	Heljä Heikkinen	Ragni Grönblom
Sniff	Jeff Harding	Ryusei Nakao	Eero Ahre	Jukka Nylund	Riko Eklundh
Hemulen	Garrick Hagon	Minoru Yada	Tapio Hämäläinen	Markku Huhtamo	Peik Stenberg
Snork	David Graham	Yasuyuki Hirata	Samuli Edelmann (episodes 1–52), Ilkka Merivaara (episodes 53–78)	Jon-Jon Geitel	Dick Idman
Mrs Fillyjonk	Stacey Gregg (episodes 14–26, 59–78), Joanna Ruiz (episodes 33–56)	Sumi Shimamoto	Leena Uotila	Carla Rindell	Cris af Enehielm
Mymble	Toni Barry (episodes 6–26), Stacey Gregg (episodes 42–56), Joanne McQuinn (episodes 60–78)	Yūko Kobayashi	Aila Svedberg	Carla Rindell	Vivi-Ann Sjögren
Too-Ticky	Stacey Gregg (episodes 9–10, 22–23), Emily Stride (episode 37)	Mika Doi	Marja Packalén	Ella Pyhältö	Gumbi Zilliacus
Stinky	Garrick Hagon	Hiroko Maruyama	Matti Ruohola	Juha Varis	Peik Stenberg
Police Inspector	Jeff Harding	Takaya Hashi	Tapio Hämäläinen, Ilkka Merivaara (episode 100)	Jarmo Koski	Samuel Huber
Alicia	Stacey Gregg (episodes 35–56), Joanne McQuinn (episodes 62–78)	Sakiko Tamagawa	Marja Packalén	Ella Pyhältö	Annika Miiros
The Witch	Stacey Gregg (episodes 35–56), Joanna Ruiz (episodes 62–78)	Hisako Kyoda	Leena Uotila	Carla Rindell	Sue Lemström
The Hobgoblin	Jeff Harding (episodes 2, 8), Robert Chase (episode 75)	Tomomichi Nishimura	Timo Torikka	Markus Bäckman	Samuel Huber
Thingumy and Bob	Stacey Gregg (Thingumy) (episodes 6–8), Joanne McQuinn (Thingumy) (episode 74), Stacey Gregg (Bob) (episodes 6–8), Joanna Ruiz (Bob) (episode 74)	Isamu Tanonaka (Thingumy); You Inoue (Bob)	Marja Packalén (Thingumy); Leena Uotila (Bob)	Ella Pyhältö (Thingumy); Katja Aakkula (Bob)	Sue Lemström (Thingumy); Hellen Willberg (Bob)
Ninny	Stacey Gregg	Miina Tominaga	Leena Uotila	Ella Pyhältö	Berit Neumann-Lund
The Groke (also known as Morran in the Japanese dub)	No actor (episodes 6–7); Jeff Harding (episodes 22, 37–38, 59)	Tomie Kataoka	Tapio Hämäläinen	Markus Bäckman	Hellen Willberg
Hodgkins (Fredrikson)	Robert Chase	Rokuro Naya	Ilkka Merivaara	Jon-Jon Geitel	Joachim Wigelius
Joxter	John Chancer	Takehito Koyasu	Timo Torikka	Ilkka Villi	Michel Budsko
Muddler	Jeff Harding	Ryusei Nakao	Eero Ahre	Jukka Nylund	Riko Eklundh
Postman	Garrick Hagon	Masamischi Sato	Matti Ruohola, Ilkka Merivaara (Bōken Nikki)	Markus Bäckman	Tom Lindblom

== Episodes ==
=== First series ===
The first series consists of 78 episodes, although only 76 episodes have been aired in certain countries. The series was first aired on TV Tokyo in Japan on 12 April 1990. The last episode aired in Japan on 3 October 1991. As its initial run went on, Moomin become known for it being aired during the Gulf War. When the Operation Desert Storm broke out on 17 January 1991, other TV stations around Tokyo switched to emergency broadcasting with only TV Tokyo broadcasting the anime as usual and attracted a lot of attention.

After its first run in Japan, the series was subsequently broadcast on the channels of the rest of the broadcasters that participated in the production dubbed into their own language. In Tove Jansson's home country Finland, the series first aired on YLE TV1 on 1 September 1991, and a Swedish dub first aired three days later. After the first run, the series has been moved to YLE TV2 and has been rebroadcasting along with the sequel series in almost every year, either with the Finnish or Swedish dub. In 2017, presentations rights of the series in Finland was moved from Yle to commercial channel MTV Oy. The series received a new HD-remaster, and a new Finnish translation and dubbing was recorded, due to copyright reasons. The new Finnish translation was based largely on the CBBC English version. The series was also first broadcast on La 2 in Spain and on VARA in the Netherlands.

The first anime series was distributed to many other countries worldwide. In 1992, it was dubbed into English in the United Kingdom for Children's BBC (later renamed CBBC) and was distributed by Maverick Entertainment under the title Moomin. The dubbing was recorded at Eco Studios, and later CTV Studios (episodes 27-78 from 1995 to 1999), both in Cardiff. The full voice cast includes Susan Sheridan, Toni Barry, Pat Starr, Peter Whitman, John Chancer, David Graham, Garrick Hagon, Jeff Harding and Stacey Jefferson. Sheridan's daughter Emily Stride also provided the English voice of Too-Ticky in some episodes. The series has never aired in the United States with the exception being Hawaii, where the series was retitled The Tales of Moomin Valley and aired on television station K-5. Despite the different opening and ending themes, Hawaii airings featured the British dub from Children's BBC.

Between 2019 and 2020, all 78 episodes of the first series were uploaded to YouTube by official Moomin channel under the new title Adventures from Moominvalley. The British dub was used again with new, high definition remastered prints.

=== Second series: Delightful Moomin Family: Adventure Diary ===
After the high success of the first anime series in Japan, the second anime series titled Delightful Moomin Family: Adventure Diary was produced. TV Tokyo aired it in Japan from 10 October 1991, to 26 March 1992. Consisting of 26 more episodes, continued from the first period, it will be from episodes 79 to 104. The sequel series does not feature any adaptations of Jansson's books but some of its episodes were based on Moomin comic strips.

Outside Japan only a few countries have aired Delightful Moomin Family: Adventure Diary and it has usually been featured as a new season of Moomin. The sequel series has been aired for example in Tove Jansson's home country Finland (but only in Finnish dub), Israel, Latin America, Norway, and Poland. The sequel series has never been dubbed to English and it hasn't been aired on CBBC. Producer Dennis Livson was later highly critical towards the sequel series and stated that "we had nothing left to mine from by way of Tove's own stories."

== Related media ==
=== Films ===
After the broadcast of the sequel series, a theatrical animated film Comet in Moominland was first released as a triple-feature with two unrelated shorter films on 8 August 1992, in Japan. Based on Tove Jansson's second Moomin novel of the same name, the animated film works as a prequel to the 1990 anime series. Comet in Moominland has been dubbed to several European languages, and was later dubbed into English with a separate cast (which was included on the German DVD release of the film). A modernized version of the film was planned to be released in 2020 to coincide with the 75th anniversary of the Moomin franchise, but was delayed until September 2023 due to the COVID-19 pandemic

After Tove Jansson's death, the series' producer Dennis Livson was planning to make a second film based on Moominpappa at Sea but Tove Jansson's niece Sophia Jansson didn't give him permission for it.

=== Home releases ===
In Japan, the series was released both as individual DVD volumes and box sets by Victor Entertainment. A Blu-ray Disc Box Set was also released on December 21, 2012.

During the 1990s, a selected number of episodes of the English dub were released on VHS, and in 2005 a R2 DVD of the first five episodes, entitled Moomin Mania was released by Maverick Entertainment, but was later discontinued. As of 2009, four DVD volumes has been released in the UK by STAX Entertainment, while Telescreen has released eight volumes and two box sets for the American market. These boxsets only go up to Episode 52 however, they do not include episodes 53–78. At this time there is currently no home release of English versions of these episodes. However they, along with the other 52 English episodes have all been officially uploaded to YouTube by official Moomin channel.

In the Nordic countries, the series was released by Svensk Filmindustri and by Finnkino and VL-Media in Finland. In 2017, VL-Media started publishing on DVD new remastered and re-dubbed version of the series.

=== Video games ===
There are several video games based on directly the 1990 anime series. Most of them have only seen limited releases.

Game	Details
Mūmin no sutekina purezento Original release date(s): JP: 1991	Release years by system: 1991—Terebikko
Mūmin no sutekina purezento Original release date(s): JP: 1991	Notes: Developed and published by Bandai, 30-minutes interactive video anime based on the show released for Terebikko system. The VHS console game system allowed viewers to interact with the anime using a telephone-shaped microphone to answer multiple choice questions.
Jidou Eiken Taiou Moomin to Eigo: Tanjoubi no Okurimono Original release date(s): JP: 24 June 1995	Release years by system: 1995—Sega Pico
Jidou Eiken Taiou Moomin to Eigo: Tanjoubi no Okurimono Original release date(s): JP: 24 June 1995	Notes: Developed and published by Obunsha.; An educational video game teaching the English language.
Ninni – det usynlige barnet (Ninny – the Invisible Child) Original release date(s): EU: 1996	Release years by system: 1996—Windows
Ninni – det usynlige barnet (Ninny – the Invisible Child) Original release date(s): EU: 1996	Notes: Developed by Norsk Strek A/S; Published by Nordic Softsales.
Vinter i Mummidalen (Winter in the Moomin Valley) Original release date(s): SCN: 1997	Release years by system: 1997—Windows
Vinter i Mummidalen (Winter in the Moomin Valley) Original release date(s): SCN: 1997	Notes: Developed by Norsk Strek A/S; Published by Nordic Softsales.
Mummi: Jakten på trollkarlens rubin (Moomin: Hunt for the Hobgoblin's Jewel) Original release date(s): SCN: 1998	Release years by system: 1998—Windows
Mummi: Jakten på trollkarlens rubin (Moomin: Hunt for the Hobgoblin's Jewel) Original release date(s): SCN: 1998	Notes: Developed by Norsk Strek A/S; Published by Nordic Softsales.
Moomin's Tale Original release date(s): EU: December 1, 2000; JP: June 30, 2000	Release years by system: 2000—Game Boy Color
Moomin's Tale Original release date(s): EU: December 1, 2000; JP: June 30, 2000	Notes: Developed by Sunsoft.; Published by Sunsoft Games.; European release of the game is simplified from the Japanese release by shifting placements of certain chapters. Certain features are completely removed or limited such as the playable hub-world, as each chapter contains different numbers of levels.
Moomin Tani no Okurimono Original release date(s): JP: November 19, 2009	Release years by system: 2009—Nintendo DS
Moomin Tani no Okurimono Original release date(s): JP: November 19, 2009	Notes: Developed and published by Sonic Powered.

=== Soundtracks ===
The music score of Moomin is composed by Sumio Shiratori and the original theme song as well as other singing heard in the series is performed by his wife Emiko Shiratori. From episodes 1–52, the opening theme is "Yume no Sekai he" (夢の世界へ) and the closing theme is "Tooi akogare" (遠いあこがれ), both of them having the vocals performed by Emiko Shiratori and composed by Sumio Shiratori. From episodes 53–78, the opening theme is "Omajinai no uta" (おまじないのうた) performed by "Ponpin-tai ~Moomin-dani no Nakamatachi~" group and the closing theme is "Itsuka suteki na tabi" (いつかすてきな旅) sung by Emiko Shiratori. The sequel series' opening theme is "Hesomagarincho" (ヘソまがりんちょ) by Ado Mizumori and Tyrone Hashimoto and the ending recycles the "Itsuka suteki na tabi" theme by Emiko Shiratori. Outside Japan, the international version had been aired with different opening and ending theme songs, which are composed by Dutch composer Pierre Kartner. The Nepalese dub of the series has both themes sung by Nepalese singer Deepesh Kishor Bhattarai.

There are four soundtrack albums and several single releases of both the first 1990 and sequel series, all of which are exclusively released in Japan. The first albums "Delightful Moomin Family Vol.1" (楽しいムーミン一家Vol.1) and "Delightful Moomin Family – Departure of Snufkin" (楽しいムーミン一家~スナフキンの旅立ち) were released on 1990, both having background music from the series along with storylines in between tracks narrated by Emiko Shiratori. The third album "Moomin Selection" (ムーミン・セレクション~ムーミン主題歌集~) from 1992 is basic soundtrack album that includes the opening, ending, and background music from the series. The fourth album "Delightful Moomin family – Best Selection" (「楽しいムーミン一家」ベスト・セレクション) was released on 2014 along with same tracks from previous albums with addition of new music tracks. All albums and singles in Japan are released by King Records.

The soundtrack is held in high regard within Finland and has become a source of nostalgia for many. It is still cherished and performed by younger generations. This popularity is reflected in the birth of rock arrangements and an orchestral concert series. The composer Sumio Shiratori has commented on this saying that he is moved and amazed. On November 25th, 2025, the first concert of the orchestral concert series was held in Finland at the Helsinki Music Centre, with Sumio and Emiko being guests of honors at the event. Emiko herself also took part in the performance, singing some of the original Japanese songs.
