= Music of Final Fantasy IX =

Music from the video game Final Fantasy IX

The music of the video game Final Fantasy IX was composed by regular series composer Nobuo Uematsu. It was his last exclusive Final Fantasy score. The Final Fantasy IX Original Soundtrack, a compilation of all music in the game, was originally released on four Compact Discs by DigiCube in 2000, and was re-released by Square Enix in 2004. A Best Of and arranged soundtrack album of musical tracks from the game entitled Final Fantasy IX: Uematsu's Best Selection was released in 2000 by Tokyopop Soundtrax. Final Fantasy IX Original Soundtrack PLUS, an album of music from the game's full motion videos and extra tracks, was released by DigiCube in 2000 and re-released in 2004, and a collection of piano arrangements of pieces from the original soundtrack arranged by Shirō Hamaguchi and performed by Louis Leerink was released as Piano Collections Final Fantasy IX in 2001.

The game's soundtrack is best known for "Melodies of Life," the theme song of the game, performed by Emiko Shiratori in Japanese and English. The song was released as a single by King Records in 2000. The soundtrack was based around a theme of medieval music, and was heavily inspired by previous Final Fantasy games, incorporating themes and motifs from earlier soundtracks. The music was overall well received; reviewers found the soundtrack to be both well done and enjoyable, though opinions were mixed as to the reliance on music of previous games. Several tracks, especially "Melodies of Life", "Roses of May", "Vamo' Alla Flamenco" and "Not Alone" remain popular today, and have been performed numerous times in orchestral concert series, as well as being published in arranged and compilation albums by Square as well as outside groups.

== Creation and influence ==
In discussions with director Hiroyuki Ito, Uematsu was told: "It'd be fine if you compose tracks for the eight characters, an exciting battle track, a gloomy, danger-evoking piece, and around ten tracks or so". However, Uematsu spent an estimated year composing and producing "around 160" pieces for Final Fantasy IX, with 140 appearing in the game.

Uematsu composed with a piano, and used two contrasting methods: "I create music that fits the events in the game, but sometimes, the event designer will adjust a game event to fit the music I've already written". Uematsu felt previous games Final Fantasy VII and VIII had a mood of realism, but that IX was more of a fantasy, so "a serious piece as well as silly, fun pieces could fit in". He felt the theme was medieval music, and was given a two-week break to travel in Europe for inspiration, such as looking at old castles in Germany and other locations. However, the music was not entirely composed in the medieval mode, as Uematsu claims that "it would be unbalanced" and "a little boring". He aimed for a "simple, warm" style and included uncommon instruments such as a kazoo and dulcimer. Uematsu also included motifs from older Final Fantasy games "because Final Fantasy IX was returning to the roots, so to speak" and incorporated ideas such as "the old intro for battle music" and arranged the Volcano theme from Final Fantasy and the Pandemonium theme from Final Fantasy II, as well as others from the series. Uematsu has claimed several times that Final Fantasy IX is his favorite work, as well as the one he is most proud of. He also stated in the liner notes for the Final Fantasy IX: Original Soundtrack album that he was "glad that [he] was able to join this project".

== Albums ==
=== FINAL FANTASY IX Original Soundtrack ===
FINAL FANTASY IX Original Soundtrack

Soundtrack album to Final Fantasy IX by Nobuo Uematsu
- Released: August 30, 2000; May 10, 2004 (re-release)
- Recorded: Sound City, Tokyo
- Genre: Video game music, classical
- Length: 72:18 (disc one); 71:18 (disc two); 71:40 (disc three); 72:05 (disc four); 286:31 (total)
- Label: DigiCube; Square Enix (re-release)
- Producer: Nobuo Uematsu

Final Fantasy IX Original Soundtrack is a soundtrack album containing musical tracks from the game, composed, arranged and produced by Nobuo Uematsu. It spans four discs and 110 tracks, covering a duration of 4:46:31. It was first released on 30 August 2000 by DigiCube, and subsequently re-released on 10 May 2004 by Square Enix. The lyrics for the theme song to the game, "Melodies of Life", were written by Hiroyuki Ito for the Japanese version and Alexander O. Smith for the English version. The song was performed in both languages by Emiko Shiratori.

The album reached #4 on the Japan Oricon charts, and sold 101,000 copies as of January 2010. The album was well received; many reviewers found that it was a "good" soundtrack, though not without faults. Josh Bizeau and Roko Zaper of Soundtrack Central especially liked it, finding it to be "a blessing for Final Fantasy music", and both Patrick Gann of RPGFan and Isaac Engelhorn of Soundtrack Central felt it was Uematsu's second-best work to date, behind only the soundtrack of Final Fantasy VI. Ben Schweitzer of RPGFan, however, found that the heavy reliance of the soundtrack on music and themes from previous Final Fantasy soundtracks resulted in a sense of "stretched creativity" and "a bit of blandness", though he still felt it was not "a bad soundtrack... [but] not really a great soundtrack". Other reviewers such as Engelhorn and Tyler Schulley of "Final Fantasy Symphony", enjoyed the fact that it pulled from previous soundtracks, feeling that it gave the album "the classic feel of the older Final Fantasies" while still being "original and beautiful".

Track listing

Literal translation of the original titles appear in (brackets) if different.

Disc one (SSCX-10043)
No.	Title	Japanese title (Romanization)	Length
1.	"A Place to Call Home" ("The Place I'll Return to Someday")	いつか帰るところ (Itsuka Kaeru Tokoro)	2:08
2.	"Memories Erased by a Storm"	嵐に消された記憶 (Arashi ni Kesareta Kioku)	1:15
3.	"The Meeting" ("Battle Strategy Conference")	作戦会議 (Sakusen Kaigi)	1:38
4.	"Sky of Alexandria"	アレクサンドリアの空 (Arekusandoria no Sora)	0:54
5.	"Vivi's Theme"	ビビのテーマ (Bibi no Tēma)	3:11
6.	"Sword of Fury" ("Betting on This Sword")	この刃に懸けて (Kono Yaiba ni Kakete)	2:42
7.	"Vamo' Alla Flamenco"		1:52
8.	"Find the Princess" ("Decisive Action ~Search for the Princess~")	決行～姫を探して～ (Kekkō ~Hime o Sagashite~)	3:14
9.	"Jesters of the Moon" ("Clowns of the Moonless Night")	月なきみそらの道化師たち (Tsukinaki Misora no Dōkeshitachi)	3:20
10.	"Steiner's Theme"	スタイナーのテーマ (Sutainā no Tēma)	2:27
11.	"Prima Vista Orchestra" ("Prima Vista Band")	プリマビスタ楽団 (Purimabisuta Gakudan)	1:45
12.	"Eye to Eye" ("Stolen Eyes")	奪われた瞳 (Ubawareta Hitomi)	2:50
13.	"The Fateful Hour" ("Tonight")	今宵 (Koyoi)	0:16
14.	"Thy Warmth"	あなたのぬくもり (Anata no Nukumori)	0:34
15.	"Tragic Love" ("Mistaken Love")	あやまちの愛 (Ayamachi no Ai)	3:35
16.	"The Evil Within" ("Queen of the Abyss")	深淵の女王 (Shin'en no Joō)	1:31
17.	"Danger in the Forest" ("Rustling Forest")	ざわめく森 (Zawameku Mori)	2:28
18.	"Battle 1"	バトル１ (Batoru 1)	2:40
19.	"Fanfare"	ファンファーレ (Fanfāre)	0:57
20.	"Distant Memory" ("Memories of That Day")	あの日の記憶 (Ano Hi no Kioku)	2:27
21.	"Battle 2"	バトル２ (Batoru 2)	4:05
22.	"Game Over"	ゲームオーバー (Gēmu Ōbā)	1:55
23.	"RUN!"	走れ！(Hashire!)	2:47
24.	"Sweet Dreams" ("Goodnight")	おやすみ (Oyasumi)	0:09
25.	"Over the Hill" ("Crossing Those Hills")	あの丘を越えて (Ano Oka o Koete)	2:38
26.	"Ice Cavern"	氷の洞窟 (Kōri no Dōkutsu)	2:59
27.	"Village of Dali" ("Frontier Village Dali")	辺境の村 ダリ (Henkyō no Mura Dari)	2:28
28.	"Beyond the Twilight"	黄昏の彼方に (Tasogare no Kanata ni)	3:07
29.	"Steiner's Delusion" ("Reckless Steiner")	盲進スタイナー (Mōshin Sutainā)	2:45
30.	"Fleeting Life" ("Limited Time")	限りある時間 (Kagiriaru Toki)	3:03
31.	"Zidane's Theme"	ジタンのテーマ (Jitan no Tēma)	2:46
32.	"Black Waltz"	黒のワルツ (Kuro no Warutsu)	1:39
Total length:			72:05

Disc two (SSCX-10044)
No.	Title	Japanese title (Romanization)	Length
1.	"Cid's Theme"	シドのテーマ (Shido no Tēma)	4:00
2.	"Out of the Frying Pan" ("One Danger Put Behind Us...")	一難去って... (Ichinan Satte...)	3:10
3.	"Lindblum"	リンドブルム (Rindoburumu)	2:11
4.	"A Song from Her Memory" ("Song of Memories")	記憶の歌 (Kioku no Uta)	1:53
5.	"Festival of the Hunt" ("Hunter's Chance")	ハンターチャンス (Hantā Chansu)	3:47
6.	"Qu's Marsh" ("Marsh of the Qu Clan")	ク族の沼 (Ku Zoku no Numa)	3:17
7.	"Quina's Theme"	クイナのテーマ (Kuina no Tēma)	3:52
8.	"Aloha de Chocobo"	アロハdeチョコボ (Aroha de Chokobo)	2:56
9.	"Ukulele de Chocobo" ("Ukule le Chocobo")	ウクレleチョコボ (Ukure le Chokobo)	2:22
10.	"Freya's Theme"	フライヤのテーマ (Furaiya no Tēma)	3:02
11.	"South Gate" ("South Gate, at the Border")	国境の南ゲート (Kokkyō no Minami Gēto)	2:56
12.	"Faerie Battle"	フェアリーバトル (Fearī Batoru)	2:28
13.	"Kingdom of Burmecia"	ブルメシア王国 (Burumeshia Ōkoku)	3:55
14.	"Unforgettable Silhouette" ("Unforgettable Face")	忘れられぬ面影 (Wasurerarenu Omokage)	3:24
15.	"Kuja's Theme"	クジャのテーマ (Kuja no Tēma)	2:25
16.	"The Wavering Blade"	迷いの剣 (Mayoi no Tsurugi)	3:17
17.	"Dark City Treno" ("Sleepless Town Treno")	眠らない街 トレノ (Nemuranai Machi Toreno)	2:53
18.	"Theme of the Tantalus"	タンタラスのテーマ (Tantarasu no Tēma)	2:21
19.	"Immoral Melody"	背徳の旋律 (Haitoku no Senritsu)	2:25
20.	"Garnet's Theme"	ガーネットのテーマ (Gānetto no Tēma)	2:40
21.	"Gargan Roo" ("Road of Roots – Gargan Roo")	古根の道 ガルガン・ルー (Furune no Michi Garugan Rū)	1:47
22.	"Cleyra's Trunk"	クレイラの幹 (Kureira no Miki)	2:43
23.	"Cleyra Settlement"	クレイラの街 (Kureira no Machi)	2:21
24.	"Eternal Harvest"	永遠の豊穣 (Eien no Hōjō)	1:15
25.	"Mourning the Sky"	空を愁いて (Sora o Ureite)	2:35
26.	"The Extraction"	抽出 (Chūshutsu)	1:15
Total length:			71:10

Disc three (SSCX-10045)
No.	Title	Japanese title (Romanization)	Length
1.	"City Under Siege" ("Assault")	襲撃 (Shūgeki)	2:23
2.	"Rose of May"	ローズ・オブ・メイ (Rōzu obu Mei)	2:34
3.	"Fossil Roo"	フォッシル・ルー (Fosshiru Rū)	2:31
4.	"Conde Petie" ("Conde Petie, Village Where the Mountains Blow")	山吹く里 コンデヤ・パタ (Yama Fuku Sato Kondeya Pata)	3:43
5.	"Black Mage Village"	黒魔導士の村 (Kuro Madōshi no Mura)	3:22
6.	"Unrequited Love"	とどかぬ想い (Todokanu Omoi)	3:47
7.	"Before the Altar" ("Ceremony Before the Gods")	神前の儀 (Shinzen no Gi)	2:09
8.	"Eiko's Theme"	エーコのテーマ (Ēko no Tēma)	3:36
9.	"Madain Sari, Village of the Lost Summoners" ("Ruins of Madain Sari")	廃墟 マダイン・サリ (Haikyo Madain Sari)	3:49
10.	"Eidolon Wall" ("Summon Wall")	召喚壁 (Shōkan heki)	2:31
11.	"Iifa, the Ancient Tree of Life" ("Iifa Tree")	イーファの樹 (Īfa no Ki)	2:29
12.	"Amarant's Theme" ("Salamander's Theme")	サラマンダーのテーマ (Saramandā no Tēma)	2:28
13.	"Devil's Ambition" ("Footsteps of Desire")	欲望の足音 (Yokubō no Ashioto)	2:19
14.	"Outlaws" ("We're Thieves")	おれたちゃ盗賊 (Oretacha Tōzoku)	2:11
15.	"Foolproof Love Letter Scheme" ("Epic Battle of Love Letters")	ラブレター大作戦 (Rabu Retā Daisakusen)	2:53
16.	"Tetra Master" ("Quad Mist")	クアッド・ミスト (Kuaddo Misuto)	3:39
17.	"Moogle's Theme"	モーグリのテーマ (Mōguri no Tēma)	1:56
18.	"Something to Protect" ("Those Whom I Must Protect")	守るべきもの (Mamorubeki mono)	2:21
19.	"Light of Destiny" ("The Summoned One")	召喚されし者 (Shōkansareshi mono)	2:55
20.	"Master of Time"	時の管理者 (Toki no Kanrisha)	2:43
21.	"Oeilvert"	ウイユヴェール (Uiyuvēru)	2:17
22.	"Chamber of a Thousand Faces" ("A Transient Past")	刻まれた過去 (Kizamareta Kako)	2:52
23.	"Look Back, See the Frog!"	振りカエルと奴がいる (Furi Kaeru to Yatsu ga Iru)	2:03
24.	"Esto Gaza" ("Sacred Ground Esto Gaza")	聖なる地 エスト・ガザ (Seinaru Chi Esuto Gaza)	3:49
25.	"Mount Gulug" ("Gulug Volcano")	グルグ火山 (Gurugu Kazan)	2:07
26.	"Broken Spell, Healed Hearts" ("Melting Magic and Hearts")	とけた魔法と心 (Toketa Mahō to Kokoro)	2:03
Total length:			71:30

Disc four (SSCX-10046)
No.	Title	Japanese title (Romanization)	Length
1.	"Aboard the Hilda Garde" ("The Airship Hilda Garde")	飛空艇 ヒルダガルデ (Hikūtei Hiruda Garude)	4:07
2.	"Daguerreo, the Hermit's Library"	隠者の書庫 ダゲレオ (Inja no Shoko Dagereo)	2:04
3.	"Ipsen's Castle"	イプセンの古城 (Ipusen no Kojō)	1:58
4.	"The Four Mirrors"	４枚の鏡 (Yonmai no Kagami)	2:45
5.	"Guardians" ("Everyone's Battle")	それぞれの戦い (Sorezore no Tatakai)	2:02
6.	"Terra"	テラ (Tera)	2:10
7.	"Bran Bal, the Soulless Village"	魂無き村 ブラン・バル (Tamashīnaki Mura Buran Baru)	3:11
8.	"Pandemonium" ("Pandemonium, the Castle Frozen in Time")	時を刻む城 パンデモニウム (Toki o Kizamu Shiro Pandemoniumu)	3:03
9.	"Not Alone"	独りじゃない (Hitori ja nai)	2:36
10.	"Unforgettable Sorrow" ("Endless Sorrow")	消えぬ悲しみ (Kienu Kanashimi)	3:29
11.	"Another Nightmare" ("Return of the Evil Mist")	悪霧ふたたび (Aku Kiri Futatabi)	2:26
12.	"Silver Dragon" ("Assault of the Silver Dragons")	銀竜戦 (Ginryūsen)	3:48
13.	"Memoria" ("Place of Memory")	記憶の場所 (Kioku no Basho)	2:14
14.	"Crystal World"	クリスタルワールド (Kurisutaru Wārudo)	3:43
15.	"The Darkness of Eternity" ("Envoy to Destruction")	破滅への使者 (Hametsu e no Shisha)	4:43
16.	"The Final Battle"	最後の闘い (Saigo no Tatakai)	6:15
17.	"Star-Crossed Lovers" ("Bittersweet Romance")	甘く悲しい恋 (Amaku Kanashī Koi)	1:32
18.	"Kiss of Betrayal"	裏切りの口づけ (Uragiri no Kuchizuke)	0:28
19.	"I Want to Be Your Canary"	君の小鳥になりたい (Kimi no Kotori ni Naritai)	1:18
20.	"Inseparable Hearts" ("Two Hearts That Can't Be Stolen")	盗めぬ二人のこころ (Nusumenu Futari no Kokoro)	1:21
21.	"Behind the Door"	その扉の向こうに (Sono Tobira no Mukō ni)	2:06
22.	"Melodies of Life ~ Final Fantasy" (performed by Emiko Shiratori)		7:36
23.	"Prelude"	プレリュード (Pureryūdo)	2:45
24.	"CCJC TVCM 15"" ("Coca-Cola Commercial Song, 15 Second")	CCJC TVCM15" （コカ・コーラCM曲） (CCJC TVCM 15" (Koka Kōra CM Kyoku))	0:20
25.	"CCJC TVCM 30"" ("Coca-Cola Commercial Song, 30 Second")	CCJC TVCM 30"（コカ・コーラCM曲）(CCJC TVCM 30" (Koka Kōra CM Kyoku))	0:34
26.	"Melodies of Life (The Layers of Harmony)" (performed by Emiko Shiratori)		3:21
Total length:			71:54

=== Final Fantasy IX: Uematsu's Best Selection ===
Final Fantasy IX: Uematsu's Best Selection

Soundtrack album to Final Fantasy IX by Nobuo Uematsu
- Released: August 21, 2000
- Genre: Video game music, classical
- Length: 74:16
- Label: Tokyopop Soundtrax
- Producer: Nobuo Uematsu

Final Fantasy IX: Uematsu's Best Selection is a soundtrack album composed of popular musical tracks from the Final Fantasy IX: Original Soundtrack album. It was arranged by Nobuo Uematsu, Shirō Hamaguchi, Kunihiko Kurosawa, and Haruo Kondo. Vocals were again performed by Emiko Shiratori for "Melodies of Life". It spans 33 tracks and covers a duration of 74:16. The first 32 tracks correspond to tracks on the Final Fantasy IX: Original Soundtrack album, while the last track, an arranged version of "A Place to Call Home", can only be found on this album. It was first released on August 21, 2000 worldwide by Tokyopop Soundtrax, with English track names. The release bears the catalog number TPCD 0201-2.

Reviewers were much less pleased with Final Fantasy IX: Uematsu's Best Selection than with the original soundtrack, finding it to have a "great track listing" but that it felt as if "[they] tried to get as many tracks on the disc as they could", with the result that many tracks were cut too short.

Tracklist
No.	Title	Length
1.	"A Place to Call Home"	1:16
2.	"Memory Erased by a Storm"	1:14
3.	"Sky of Alexandria"	0:55
4.	"Vivi's Theme"	1:45
5.	"Vamo' Alla Flamenco"	1:54
6.	"Steiner's Theme"	2:30
7.	"Danger in the Forest"	2:30
8.	"Battle 1"	1:31
9.	"Over the Hill"	2:40
10.	"Village of Dali"	2:31
11.	"Zidane's Theme"	2:48
12.	"Cid's Theme"	2:08
13.	"A Song from Her Memory"	1:55
14.	"Quina's Theme"	2:18
15.	"Ukulele de Chocobo"	1:19
16.	"Freya's Theme"	3:05
17.	"Tantalus's Theme"	1:19
18.	"Wicked Melody"	2:28
19.	"Garnet's Theme"	2:42
20.	"Black Mage Village"	1:54
21.	"Eiko's Theme"	2:03
22.	"Amarant's Theme"	2:31
23.	"Something to Protect"	1:18
24.	"Look Back, See the Frog!"	2:05
25.	"Daguerreo, the Hermit's Library"	2:06
26.	"Bran Bal, the Soulless Village"	1:43
27.	"Not Alone"	2:38
28.	"Unforgettable Sorrow"	1:54
29.	"The Final Battle"	4:02
30.	"Behind the Door"	2:06
31.	"Melodies of Life ~ Final Fantasy"	7:36
32.	"Prelude"	1:56
33.	"FU-RU-SA-TO"	1:36

=== FINAL FANTASY IX Original Soundtrack PLUS ===
FINAL FANTASY IX Original Soundtrack PLUS

Soundtrack album to Final Fantasy IX by Nobuo Uematsu
- Released: December 6, 2000; October 20, 2004 (re-release)
- Genre: Video game music, classical
- Length: 66:30
- Label: DigiCube; Square Enix (re-release)
- Producer: Nobuo Uematsu

Final Fantasy IX Original Soundtrack PLUS is a soundtrack album consisting of pieces that did not appear on the original soundtrack. The album was composed by Nobuo Uematsu and orchestrated by Shirō Hamaguchi. Emiko Shiratori supplied the vocals for "The Song of Zidane and Dagger" and "Melodies of Life (Silent Mix)". The album contains music from the majority of the game's full motion videos and several extra tracks that did not appear in the game, which appear as tracks 34 through 41 on the album. It also contains a bonus track, an English version of "Melodies of Life" entitled "Melodies of Life (Silent Mix)", found at the last track on the album. The album spans 42 tracks and covers a duration of 66:30. It was first published by DigiCube on December 6, 2000, and subsequently re-published by Square Enix on October 20, 2004. The original release bears the catalog number SSCX-10047 and the reprint SQEX-10035.

Final Fantasy IX Original Soundtrack PLUS sold over 4,100 copies. It was very well received, with reviewers finding the tunes to have "great dynamics" and "incredibly well made", and that the "orchestrations work wonders with Uematsu's incidental music". It reached #58 on the Oricon charts.

Track list
No.	Title	Japanese title (literal translation if different)	Length
1.	"Brahne and the Performers"	ブラネ登場~劇開幕 Burane Tōjō ~ Geki Kaimaku ("Brahne's Appearance ~ The Play Begins")	0:43
2.	"Steiner Crashes into the Tower"	万国旗スタイナー激突 Bankokuki Stainā Gekitotsu ("World Flags - Steiner Crashes")	0:39
3.	"Escape from Alexandria"	アレクサンドリアからの脱出 Arekusandoria kara no Dasshutsu	1:14
4.	"The Prima Vista Crashes"	プリマビスタ墜落 Purima Bisuta Tsuiraku ("Prima Vista Crash")	0:58
5.	"Blank Turns to Stone"	ブランク石化 Buranku Sekka ("The Petrification of Blank")	1:21
6.	"Black Mage vs Black Mage"	黒魔道士vs黒魔道士 Kuro Madōshi VS Kuro Madōshi	0:44
7.	"Breaching the South Gate"	南ゲート突破 Minami Gēto Toppa ("Breaking Through South Gate")	1:20
8.	"Arrival at Lindblum"	リンドブルム王国到着 Rindoburumu Ōkoku Tōchaku ("Arrival in Lindblum Kingdom")	0:51
9.	"The Song of Zidane and Dagger"	歌~ジタンとダガー Uta ~ Jitan to Dagā ("Song ~ Zidane and Dagger")	0:49
10.	"Kuja Exits Burmecia"	ブルメシアから去るクジャ Burumeshia kara Saru Kuja	0:52
11.	"Odin Destroys Cleyra"	召喚獣発動クレイラ消滅 Shōkanjū Hatsudō Kureira Shōmetsu ("Summoned Beast Destroys Cleyra")	0:47
12.	"Lindblum in Flames"	リンドブルム炎上 Rindoburumu Enjō	0:53
13.	"The Fall of Lindblum"	リンドブルム壊滅 Rindoburumu Kaimetsu ("Lindblum Annihilation")	0:59
14.	"The Mist Dissipates"	霧の消滅 Kiri no Shōmetsu ("The Disappearing Mist")	0:36
15.	"Dagger's Flashback: The End of Madain Sari"	ダガー回想(召喚士村の滅亡) Dagā Kaisō (Shōkanshi Mura no Metsubō) ("Dagger's Recollection (Village of the Summoners Destroyed)")	0:43
16.	"Bahamut is Summoned"	召喚!バハムート Shōkan! Bahamūto ("Recalling Bahamut")	0:48
17.	"Destruction of Brahne's Fleet"	全滅ブラネ艦隊 Zenmetsu Burane Kantai	1:08
18.	"All Hail the New Queen"	新女王誕生 Shin Joō Tanjō ("Birth of the New Queen")	0:39
19.	"Bahamut Attacks"	バハムート来襲 Bahamūto Raishū	0:34
20.	"Eiko Falls"	エーコ降下 Ēko Kōka	0:39
21.	"Alexander"	アレクサンダー Arekusandā	1:10
22.	"The Ghost Ship"	幽霊船 Yūreisen	0:25
23.	"Dagger's Rescue"	ダガー救出 Dagā Kyūshutsu	1:11
24.	"Dagger Cuts Her Hair"	髪を切るダガー Kami o Kiru Dagā	0:51
25.	"Dagger's Flashback: The Ghost Ship"	ダガー回想(幽霊船) Dagā Kaisō (Yūreisen)	0:26
26.	"Neo-Kuja's Downfall"	ネオクジャ崩壊 Neo Kuja Hōkai	1:02
27.	"Flight from Terra"	テラより脱出 Tera yori Dasshutsu	0:50
28.	"Zidane and Dagger Part Ways"	ジタン、ダガー別れ Jitan, Dagā Wakare	0:39
29.	"Back to Kuja"	クジャの元へ Kuja no Moto e	1:17
30.	"Rufus's Welcome Ceremony (Millennium Version)"	ルーファウス歓迎式典 Millennium Version Rūfausu Kangei Shikiten Millennium Version	2:19
31.	"Dorga and Unne"	ドーガとウネ Dōga to Une	2:11
32.	"The Girl from Madain Sari"	マダイン・サリの娘 Madain Sari no Musume	3:37
33.	"Kuja's Theme (Millennium Version)"	クジャのテーマ Millennium Version Kuja no Tēma Millennium Version	2:34
34.	"Main Theme"	Main	4:52
35.	"Waltz"	Waltz	1:55
36.	"Ancient Motet I"	Kogaku Motet 1	2:42
37.	"Organum"	Organum	2:19
38.	"Mediterranean"	Mediterranean	2:33
39.	"Somewhere III"	Dokokade 3	1:07
40.	"Weuber"	Weuber	3:10
41.	"Kuja V"	Kuja 5	4:30
42.	"Melodies of Life (Silent Mix)"	Melodies of Life (Silent Mix)	7:33

=== Piano Collections: FINAL FANTASY IX ===
Piano Collections: FINAL FANTASY IX

Soundtrack album to Final Fantasy IX by Nobuo Uematsu, Shirō Hamaguchi, Louis Leerink
- Released: January 24, 2001; July 22, 2004 (re-release)
- Recorded: Sound City, Tokyo
- Genre: Video game music, classical
- Length: 53:44
- Label: DigiCube; Square Enix (re-release)
- Producer: Nobuo Uematsu

Piano Collections: Final Fantasy IX is a collection of Final Fantasy IX music composed by Nobuo Uematsu, arranged for the piano by Shirō Hamaguchi, and performed by Louis Leerink. It spans 14 tracks and covers a duration of 53:44. It was first released on January 24, 2001, in Japan by DigiCube, and subsequently re-released on July 22, 2004, by Square Enix. The original release bears the catalog number SSCX-10048 and the re-release bears the catalog number SQEX-10027. The album was well received, with reviewers finding the album "enjoyable" and "a pleasant surprise", although they did find some of the arrangements to be "a bit on the simple side".

Track list
No.	Title	Japanese title	Length
1.	"Eternal Harvest"	永遠の豊穣 Eternal Harvest Eien no Hōjō – Eternal Harvest	3:05
2.	"Hermit's Library - Daguerreo"	隠者の書庫ダゲレオ Inja no Shoko ~ Dagereo	4:19
3.	"The Place I'll Return to Someday"	いつか帰るところ Itsuka Kaeru Tokoro	3:14
4.	"Vamo' alla Flamenco"	Vamo' alla Flamenco	3:00
5.	"Village of Dali ("Frontier Village Dali")"	辺境の村ダリ Henkyō no Mura ~ Dari	4:52
6.	"Soulless Village, Bran Bal"	魂なき村ブラン・バル Tamashiinaki Mura ~ Buran Baru	4:27
7.	"Unforgettable Sorrow ("Endless Sorrow")"	消えぬ悲しみ Kienu Kanashimi	3:44
8.	"Not Alone"	独りじゃない Hitori ja nai	4:03
9.	"Inseparable Hearts ("Two Hearts That Can't Be Stolen") ~ Behind the Door"	盗めぬ二人のこころ~その扉の向こうに Nusumenu Futari no Kokoro ~ Sono Tobira no Mukō ni	3:58
10.	"Rose of May"	ローズ・オブ・メイ Rōzu obu Mei	3:50
11.	"Dark City Treno ("Sleepless Town Treno")"	眠らない街トレノ Nemuranai Machi Toreno	2:41
12.	"Unrequited Love"	とどかぬ想い Todokanu Omoi	4:30
13.	"Final Battle"	最後の闘い Saigo no Tatakai	4:29
14.	"Melodies of Life"	Melodies Of Life	3:32

== Melodies of Life ==
"Melodies of Life" is the theme song of Final Fantasy IX, and consists primarily of two themes that were frequently used in the game itself: the Overworld theme ("Crossing Those Hills") and a lullaby that is sung by Garnet. It was performed by Emiko Shiratori in both the Japanese and English versions, arranged by Shirō Hamaguchi, and composed, like the rest of the game, by Nobuo Uematsu. The lyrics were written by game director Hiroyuki Ito (credited as Shiomi) in the Japanese version and Alexander O. Smith in the English version. The song was released as a single by King Records on August 2, 2000, and contains both the English and Japanese versions, an instrumental version, and a bonus track named "Galway Sky". The single covers a duration of 23:17 and has a catalog number of KICS-811. Melodies of Life reached #10 on the Oricon charts, and sold 100,000 copies.

== Legacy ==
The Black Mages have arranged four pieces from Final Fantasy IX. These are "Hunter's Chance" and "Vamo' Alla Flamenco" from the album The Skies Above, published in 2004, and "Assault of the Silver Dragons" and "Grand Cross" from the album Darkness and Starlight, published in 2008. Additionally, Uematsu continues to perform certain pieces in his Dear Friends: Music from Final Fantasy concert series. The music of Final Fantasy IX has also appeared in various official concerts and live albums, such as 20020220 music from FINAL FANTASY, a live recording of an orchestra performing music from the series including "Vamo' Alla Flamenco". Additionally, "Vamo' Alla Flamenco" was performed by the Royal Stockholm Philharmonic Orchestra and the Chicagoland Pops Orchestra for the Distant Worlds: Music from Final Fantasy concert tour, while "Not Alone" was performed by the New Japan Philharmonic Orchestra in the Tour de Japon: Music from Final Fantasy concert series. "Melodies of Life" was performed at the Press Start -Symphony of Games- 2008 concerts in Tokyo and Shanghai. "Vamo' Alla Flamenco" was played at the Fantasy Comes Alive concert in Singapore on April 30, 2010. Independent but officially licensed releases of Final Fantasy IX music have been composed by such groups as Project Majestic Mix, which focuses on arranging video game music. Selections also appear on Japanese remix albums, called dojin music, and on English remixing websites.
