= Dennis Livson =

Finnish film and television producer (1946–2013)

Dennis Abraham Livson (24 November 1946 – 9 November 2013) was a Finnish television producer and amusement park owner. He was best known as the producer of Moomin and its derived feature film Comet in Moominland, as well as the developer of Moomin World in Naantali. Livson was also a member of the Naantalli Municipal Council between 2008 and 2012. He was affiliated to the Centre Party.

== Early life and studies ==
Livson was a Finnish Jew born in Helsinki, where he also studied. In 1967, he traveled to Israel to visit kibbutzes, where he studied to become a youth councilor. After the start of the Six-Day War, he voluntarily joined the Israeli army and ended up at an anti-bombing shelter near Mount Carmel in Haifa. Later, his experiences with the war eventually caused him to become against wars. He later worked as a youth councilor at the Helsinki School of Business Economics, with a master's degree in Economics.

== Career ==
Between 1970 and 1975, Livson worked at the international sales unit of Mainostelevisio. His career at MTV was marked by misunderstandings, after which he became a businessman. He produced programmes such as nature documentaries. He also worked as a director of programming at Helsingin Kaapelitelevisio before he moved to the Netherlands. Upon moving, he started using his know-how for the Dutch cable industry, working for a project for a "violence-free" kids channel, which would become Kindernet; said channel started on 1 March 1998.

Livson wanted to create children's programmes with a clear educational message. Between 1989 and 1991, he assisted in the Dutch series Alfred J. Kwak as an executive producer. He later created an animated series based on the Moomins in partnership with Lars Jansson, lasting 104 episodes, of which 101 aired in Finland. He maintained the rights to the series, and, in the early 1990s, built and inaugurated the Moomin World amusement park in Naantali.

In the late 90s, he was reported to live in Lahaina, on the island of Maui in the state of Hawaii. He then opened a Moomin store at the Maui Tropical Plantation mall in Waikapu to promote Hawaiian agriculture, but the local zoning commission rejected the plan. Local authorities were not satisfied with the idea that foreign characters could be used to promote Hawaiian ideals, which could be based on local mythology. After the theme park plan failed, he decided to air the Moomin series in Hawaiian on KFVE-TV (at the time a WB affiliate) from January 1999. The Moomin Store in Lahaina closed in 2004.

He planned to make a feature film in the 2000s based on the book Moominpappa at Sea, but Tove Jansson's heirs did not give him permission.

== Dennis Livson Enterprises ==
Dennis Livson owned Dennis Livson Enterprises. The company owns Moomin World. In 2002, Livson sold the company to Swiss partners due to back pain he was suffering. The situation had improved by 2007 and Livson wanted to return to work. He then reacquired the company for him. In 2012, Livson sold the company to his sons and retired. He still remained at its administrative council until his death.

Livson died in Turku on 9 November 2013.

== TV productions ==
Year	Project (film, TV series)	Working as
1978	Tuntematon ystävä	producer
1978	Poet and Muse	marketing
1988	Ox Tales (TV series)	executive producer
1989	Cubitus/Wowser (TV series)	executive producer
1989–1991	Alfred J. Kwak (TV series)	executive producer
1990–1992	Moomin (TV series)	executive producer
1991	Star Street (TV series)	executive producer
1992	Comet in Moominland	producer
1995	Bamboo Bears (TV series)	producer
