= Minoru Yada =

Japanese actor (born 1931)

- 矢田 稔
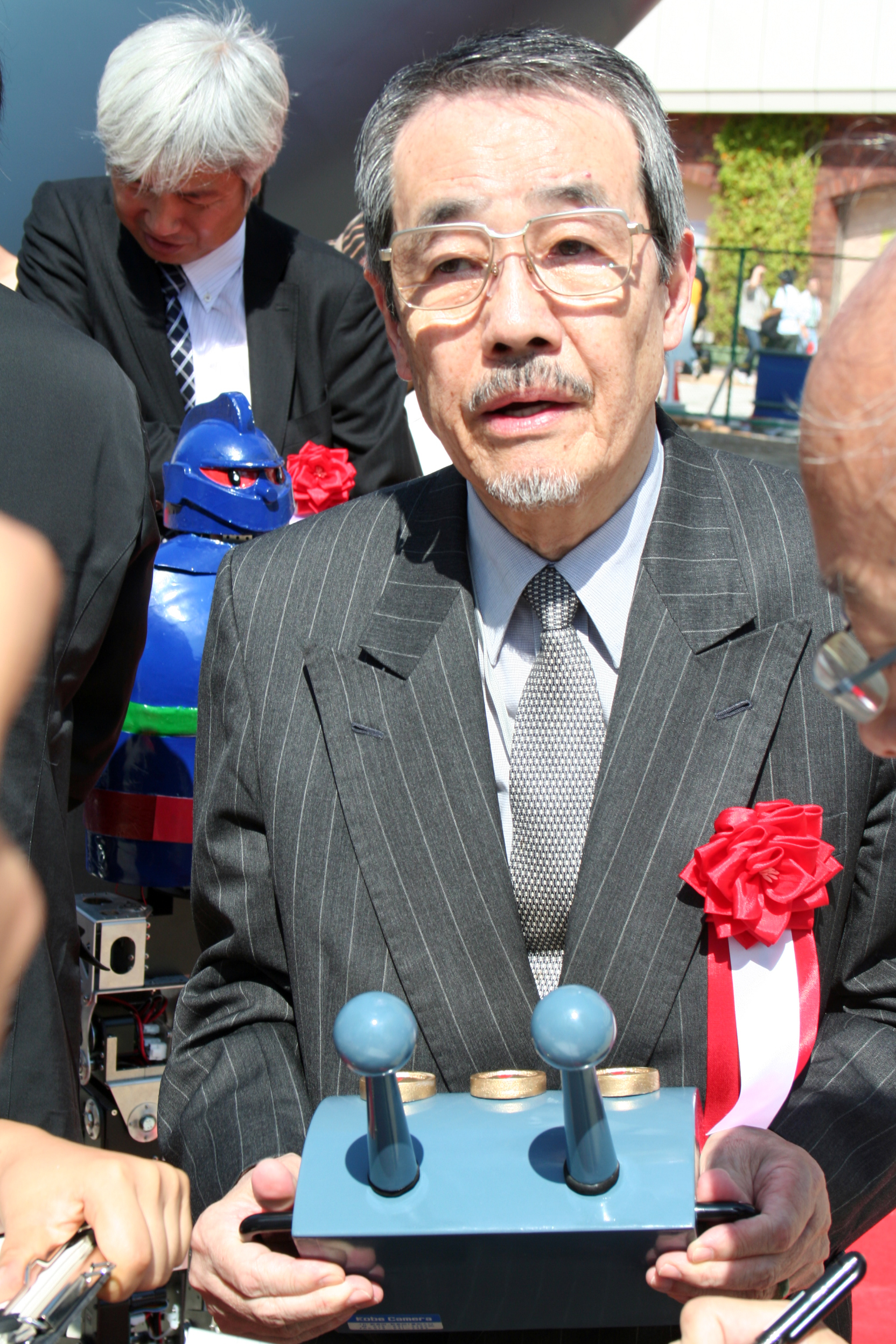
- Yada present at the ceremony commemorating the completion of the Tetsujin 28-go statue held on October 4, 2009, in Nagata Ward, Kobe.
- Born: April 27, 1931 (age 95); Yodobashi Town, Toyotama District, Tōkyō-fu, Japan
- Occupations: Actor; voice actor; singer
- Years active: 1939–present
- Agent: Kekke Corporation
- Spouse: 1
- Website: Official profile

Minoru Yada (矢田 稔, Yada Minoru; born April 27, 1931) is a Japanese actor, voice actor and singer. He is affiliated with Kekke Corporation and serves as an advisor for the Japan Actors Union.

He is known for his anime voice acting roles as Professor Shikishima in Tetsujin 28-go, Hemulen in Moomin, Mr. Ichinose in Maison Ikkoku, Baikin-sennin in Let's Go! Anpanman, the Village Elder in The Seven Deadly Sins, Grandpa Yamada in Dokaben, Geppetto in Mock of the Oak Tree and Fujiko F. Fujio in 2112: The Birth of Doraemon.

== Biography ==
Born in Yodobashi Town, Toyotama District, Tōkyō-fu, Japan, he was the second son and the youngest of four children, with an older brother and two older sisters. Ever since he was little, he lived for about five or six years in a two-story, Western-style mortar house in Nishiochiai that his father had designed and built while working as an elementary school teacher. According to Yada's family, he seemed to love the Western-style room in that house from around that time and would sing loudly by its high window, although Yada claims not to remember it. After that, partly because his father cheated on the payment for the house, he grew up in Toshima Ward.

In April 1938, he entered Tokyo City Nishi-Sugamo Dai-ichi Ordinary Elementary School (currently known as Toshima Municipal Nishi-Sugamo Elementary School). One day during his first year of elementary school, his homeroom teacher instructed him to perform a song in the music room. When he arrived, there were many adults gathered. There, Yada memorized the then-popular celebratory radio song "The Crown Prince Was Born" and sang it in the mornings and evenings, which led to him being scouted by Suguru Sasaki. Later that night, the homeroom teacher approached Yada's father and told him, "Sasaki has told me he'd like to take him on as an apprentice and train him—what do you think?" As Yada's father, he assumed that before the war, having a son enter the entertainment industry would not bode well for his own career, so he flatly refused. It seems that there were a few inquiries like, "How about this?" even when Yada was a second grader in 1939. According to Yada, Sasaki wanted him because they needed a male singer; Sasaki had been requested to record songs to boost morale on the eve of the war, and to compose songs like the popular hit Heitai-san-yo Arigatou, which was released by Columbia Records that same year. The origin of this matter traces back to Sasaki consulting Yada's female homeroom teacher, with whom he had a regular acquaintance, asking her if she could recommend any promising students. The homeroom teacher, understanding the social climate of the time, told Yada's father, "Yada-kun singing songs will also serve our country." Hearing this, his father's mind completely changed to support him overnight.

Yada officially entered show business in 1939 and began working under Sasaki in April of that same year. After performing in a children's choir, he began working as a children's song singer for Nippon Columbia and Polydor the following year. One day, invited by Kamejiro Ishii, who was also with Polydor, he went to see a performance of The Blue Bird at the Tsukiji Little Theater, which prompted him to join the Shin Jido Gekidan in 1941. He also worked as a child actor, signed with the Kadokawa Daiei Studio in 1942, and made his debut in the movie Shinsetsu. In April 1944, introduced by their thoughtful elementary school homeroom teacher who suggested it would make it easier to pursue activities in the entertainment industry, he advanced to Konan Junior High School attached to the Japan Art School. While balancing singing and theater work, he gradually shifted focus to stage and film due to a delicate throat and his voice changing.

During the Bombing of Johoku when he was 14 years old and in his second year of junior high school, the area around Ōtsuka Station, where Yada lived, was also damaged by the air raid. Thankfully, the family survived, but were left homeless after the fire destroyed all of their belongings, from records to promotional photos. Yada suspended his entertainment activities and evacuated to Ōdate, Akita Prefecture, where his maternal uncle (and his mother's younger brother) lived. From May 1st, he transferred to and attended Akita Prefectural Odate Middle School (now currently Akita Prefectural Odate Homei High School).

During his time at the middle school, he faced near-daily harassment from the third-year students, who were one grade above him, because they knew about his career in the entertainment industry. Since joining what we'd now call a sports club at that time meant he would be looked after by upperclassmen, a first-year senior who took pity on Yada urged, "Join any sports club—it doesn't matter which one," so he ended up belonging to three clubs: the swim team, the baseball team, and the basketball team.

In February 1946, after the war ended, he returned to Tokyo and resumed entertainment activities, making his post-war debut in the children's radio drama Andre and Julien, which was also his last job as a child actor. At the same time, he was also called a 'war criminal'. At the time, Yada tried to thank the aforementioned first-year senior student, but couldn't because he had to return to Tokyo. Sixty years later, while in Sendai, Miyagi Prefecture for work, he heard that the aforementioned senior had become a judge and was stationed at the court in Sendai City, Miyagi Prefecture. He headed to the courthouse, but they were off duty and had the day off. Realizing he was missing his last train, he worried, "Can't we meet after all?" However, the senior rushed straight over to him right after receiving his call. Afterward, they shared some fine sake at a station bar inside Sendai Station and exchanged words such as "Thank you so much," and "Let's do this again when we have more time."

He graduated from Kaisei Senior High School. After graduating from the Haiyuza Theatre Company Drama Institute's Actor Training School (2nd class) in March 1953, Yada participated in the establishment of the Haiyuza Studio Theater Company Doujinkai. With the dawn of the television era, he gradually shifted the focus of his activity to TV, with his first TV gig being Wagaya no Nichiyo Nikki, which premiered in October of that same year.

After becoming a freelancer, he went through the Players Center and Group Taebura before establishing Shinzakuza in 1958 and Gekidan Ushio in 1960. He then was affiliated with Haikyō, Tsuchi no Kai, Gekidan Kawa, Miwa Office, Project Megalith, and ALBA, before being currently affiliated with Kekke Corporation.

Up until recently, Yada served as both an adviser and instructor at the Ark Actors School, a talent training school located in Takamatsu City, Kagawa Prefecture, also serving as an instructor at training schools affiliated with Hoei Television Production, among others. As of 2006, coinciding with the aforementioned period of April and May when the air raids took place, he has held recitation events to pass down his own personal experience of the air raids and the horror of war.

In 2020, Yada received the Merit Award at the 14th Seiyu Awards.

== Filmography ==
=== Television animation ===
List of voice performances in television animation
Year	Title	Role	Notes	Source
1963	Tetsujin 28-go	Professor Shikishima		
1968	The Monster Kid	Additional voice		
1969	Star of the Giants	Additional voice		
1972	Mock of the Oak Tree	Geppetto		
1976	Dokaben	Grandpa Yamada		
1979	Maegami Taro	Grandpa		
1979	Lupin the 3rd Part II	Additional voice		
1980	The Adventures of Tom Sawyer	Silas		
1980	Ashita no Joe 2	Keishichi Hayashi		
1983	Itadakiman	Early	Ep. 6	
1984	Armored Trooper VOTOMS	Tedaya	Ep. 43	
1985	Star Musketeer Bismark	Wilhelm	Ep. 16	
1986	Maison Ikkoku	Mr. Ichinose		
1987	City Hunter	Yoshida	Ep. 34	
1988	Topo Gigio	Arnold, O'Sullivan		
1989	Let's Go! Anpanman	Baikin-sennin		
1990	Moomin	Hemulen		
1991	The Laughing Salesman	Uma the Out-of-Court Settlement Broker, Kaikō Kakutarō, Ōkubo Hikozaemon		
1992	Mikan Enikki	Tatsuzō		
1993	Nintama Rantarō	Yagyū Kintetsu	First voice	
1998	Tora-san's Forget Me Not	Ryūzō		
1999	Shūkan Storyland	Saeki, God		
2000	Time Bokan 2000: Kaitou Kiramekiman	Professor Rikiddo		
2003	Rumiko Takahashi Anthology	Hosoda		
2004	Black Jack	Old Zookeeper (Karte 07)		
2007	Doraemon	Uncle, Doctor, Husband	Uncle in Ep. 188, Doctor in Ep. 314, Husband in Ep. 362	
2014	The Seven Deadly Sins	Village Elder	Ep. 2	

=== Theatrical animation ===
List of voice performances in theatrical animation
Year	Title	Role	Notes	Source
1984	Nausicaä of the Valley of the Wind	Niga		
1988	Maison Ikkoku: The Final Chapter	Mr. Ichinose		
1990	Let's Go! Anpanman: Baikinman's Counterattack	Baikin-sennin		
1991	Hello Kitty's The Princess of the Magic Forest	King		
1992	Porco Rosso	Old Man		
1992	Comet in Moominland	Hemulen		
1993	Aoi Kioku - Manmō Kaitaku to Shōnen-tachi	Principal		
1994	Pom Poko	Food Stand Customer A		
1995	2112: The Birth of Doraemon	Hiroshi Fujimoto (Fujiko F. Fujio)	Short film	
1996	Doraemon: Nobita and the Galaxy Super-express	Referee		
1996	Chocchan's Story	Terada		
1997	Let's Go! Anpanman: We're Heroes	Baikin-sennin	Short film	
1997	Bakumatsu no Spasibo	Mimasakakami Masayoshi Izawa		
2001	Inochi no Chikyuu: Dioxin no Natsu	Dr. Marella		
2005	Tsubasa Reservoir Chronicle the Movie: The Princess in the Birdcage Kingdom	Elder		
2010	You Are Umasou	Beckon		
2016	Doraemon: Nobita and the Birth of Japan 2016	Hikari Clan Elder		

=== Original video animation (OVA) ===
List of voice performances in original video animation
Year	Title	Role	Notes	Source
1986	COOL COOL BYE	Village Elder		

=== Dubbing ===
==== Films ====
List of dubbing performances in overseas films
Title	Role	Notes	Source
12 Angry Men	Juror #2 (John Fiedler)	1974 Japanese dub	
The Eiger Sanction	Dragon (Thayer David)	1978 Japanese dub	

== Awards ==
Year	Award	Category	Result	Source
2020	14th Seiyu Awards	Merit Award	Won	
