= Hiroshi Saito =

Hiroshi Saitō may refer to:

== Sports ==
- Hiroshi Saito (basketball) (斎藤 博, born 1933), Japanese basketball player
- Hiroshi Saito (rower) (斎藤 宏, born 1937), Japanese rower
- Hiroshi Saito (pentathlete) (才藤 浩, born 1961), Japanese modern pentathlete
- Hiroshi Saito (footballer) (斉藤 浩史, born 1970), Japanese footballer

== Politicians ==
- Hiroshi Saito (diplomat) (斎藤 博, 1886–1939), Japanese diplomat
- Hiroshi Saitō (mayor) (斉藤 博, born 1939), Japanese politician from Tokorozawa, Saitama Prefecture
- Hiroshi Saitō (governor) (斎藤 弘, born 1957), Japanese politician from Yamagata, Yamagata Prefecture

== Other uses ==
- Hiroshi Saito (mathematician) (斎藤 裕, 1947–2010), Japanese mathematician

== See also ==
- Hiroshi
