= Ny Tid (Finland) =

Finnish Swedish-language publication

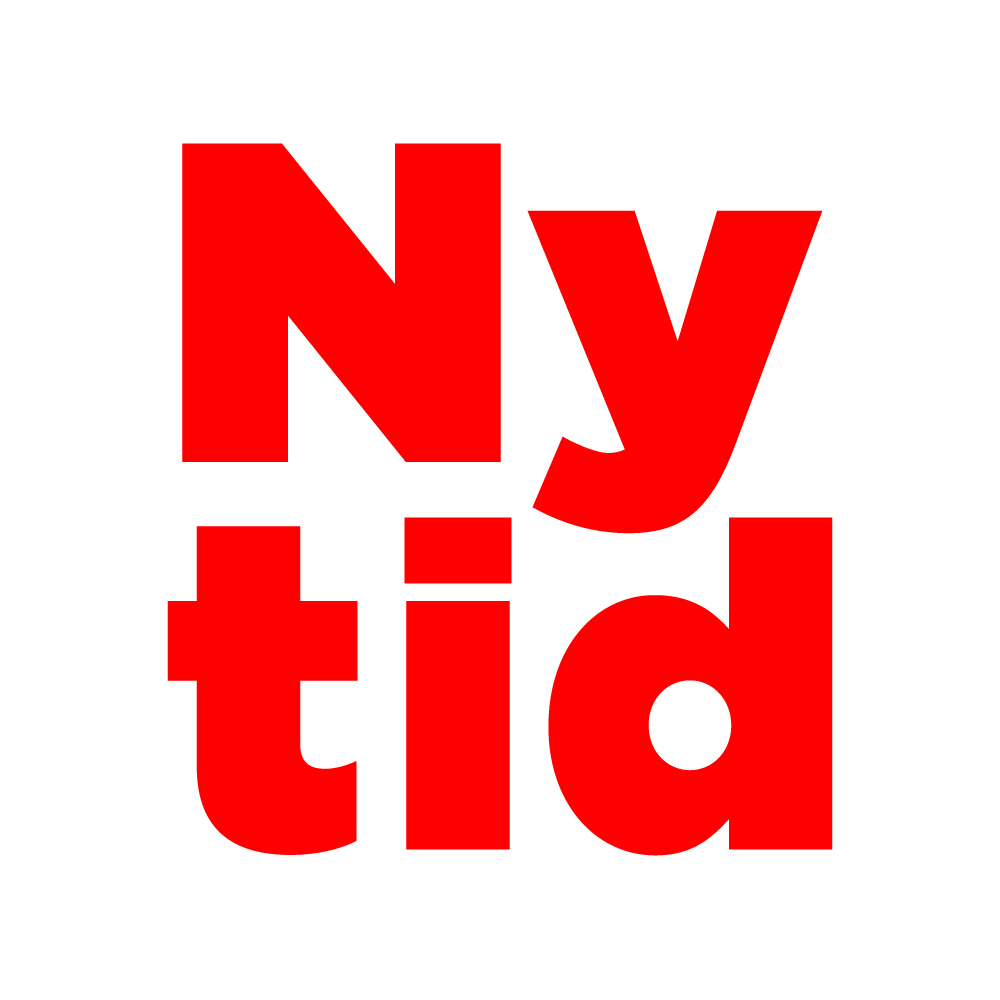
- Categories: News magazine Political magazine
- Frequency: Monthly
- First issue: 1944; 82 years ago
- Company: Tigertext AB
- Country: Finland
- Based in: Helsinki
- Language: Swedish

Ny Tid (formerly Folktidningen and Folktidningen Ny Tid) is a Swedish-language Green leftist monthly magazine published in Helsinki, Finland.

== History and profile ==
Ny Tid was founded in 1944 as a Swedish-language political magazine for the Finnish left-wing umbrella organization SKDL. The magazine has been independent from political parties since 1991 when its ownership was transferred to reader-owned Tigertext AB. The magazine states their journalistic line is green left, despite the separation from political parties.

Ny Tid is published in Helsinki on a monthly basis since 2015 and provides news and commentary on current affairs, articles, debate, and reviews.
