= Lars Jansson =

Lars Jansson may refer to:

- Lars Jansson (cartoonist) (1926–2000), Finnish author and cartoonist
- Lars Jansson (composer) (born 1951), jazz pianist and composer
