= Emiko Shiratori =

Japanese singer and songwriter (born 1950)

- (白鳥 英美子
- Born: March 16, 1950 (age 76)
- Occupations: Singer, songwriter
- Spouse: Sumio Shiratori

Emiko Shiratori (白鳥 英美子 Shiratori Emiko; born March 16, 1950) is a Japanese singer and songwriter.

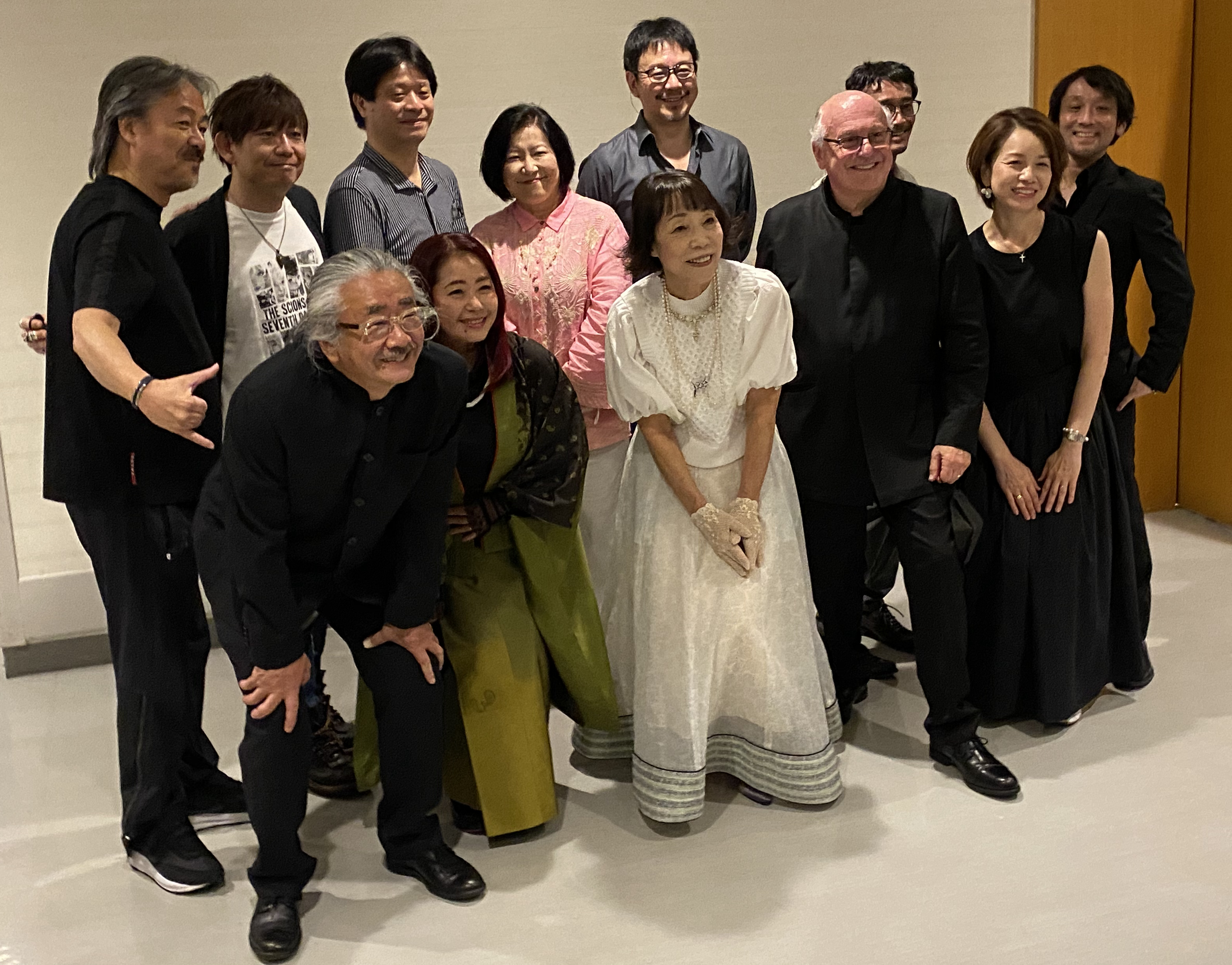
The Final Fantasy 35th Anniversary Distant Worlds Concert on August 6, 2022, at the Tokyo International Forum. Includes Nobuo Uematsu, Emiko Shiratori, Rikki, Arnie Roth, Yoko Shimomura, and others.

In 1969, the record label Toshiba EMI (now EMI Music Japan) paired her with Sumio Akutagawa, and they formed the folk group Toi et Moi. They achieved great success in Japan, and from 1969 to 1973 released an average of two albums and four singles a year. In 1973, Shiratori released her first solo album and continued as a solo artist throughout the 1970s. She performed at the 1972 Sapporo Winter Olympics and the 1998 Nagano Winter Olympics.

As a vocalist for the video game Final Fantasy IX, she performed the main theme "Melodies of Life" in both Japanese and English. Due to the English version's popularity, a special single was released, "Final Fantasy IX" Original Soundtrack. In 2006, she was asked by Nobuo Uematsu to perform a "defining version" of the song at the Final Fantasy Voices Concert; she sang a version that combined the Japanese and English lyrics.

Shiratori also performed a vocal arrangement of "Epona's Song" for The Legend of Zelda: Ocarina of Time Re-Arranged Album, and narrated, as well as performed, the opening and ending themes to the 1990–1992 Moomin anime television series. She also performed "Do-Re-Mi-Fa Lullaby", the ending theme to the second Unico movie, Unico in the Island of Magic, although the song was changed to an instrumental in the film's English version.

Shiratori has had at least one song on the NHK program Minna no Uta.

Shiratori is married to composer and music producer Sumio Shiratori, and mother of singer Maika Shiratori.
