= Sumio Shiratori =

Japanese composer and music producer

Sumio Shiratori 白鳥 澄夫
- Born: 1950 (age 75–76)
- Genres: Classical, progressive rock, folk
- Occupations: Composer, music producer
- Years active: 1969–present
- Label: King Records

Sumio Shiratori (白鳥 澄夫 Shiratori Sumio) is a Japanese composer and music producer.

== Career ==
He is best known for composing the soundtrack to the 1990–1992 Moomin anime television series, based on the Moomin books and comic strips by illustrator and author Tove Jansson. He produced in total 260 tracks for the show, released in four albums. The original Japanese theme song as well as other singing heard in the series is performed by his wife Emiko Shiratori. The music was influenced by progressive rock, traditional Japanese flute music and, in the case of the character of Snufkin, the folk song movement tradition popular in Japan in Shiratori's youth.

== Cultural Impact ==
The soundtrack has achieved a legendary status in Finland and continues to be widely cherished even by younger generations. It has led to parodies such as "Moomin rock" as well as a Moomin concert series, produced by among others the YouTuber Heikki Ranta, who personally attempted to reach out to Shiratori. After he finally succeeded, the composer revealed that he had been completely unaware of how popular his music was in Finland, which he was moved and amazed by. An anecdote that amused Shiratori is that during Finnish conscription, the young recruits would start humming the melody for the Groke when a high-ranking sergeant enters. On November 25th, 2025, the first concert of the orchestral concert series was held in Finland at the Helsinki Music Centre, with Sumio and Emiko being guests of honors at the event. Emiko herself also took part in the performance, singing some of the original Japanese songs.

== Personal life ==
He is the husband and co-producer of the singer and songwriter Emiko Shiratori, and father of singer Maika Shiratori.
