= Conveying the Child's Coffin (A Child's Funeral) =

Painting by Albert Edelfelt

- Ett barns likfärd (Swedish), Lapsen ruumissaatto (Finnish)
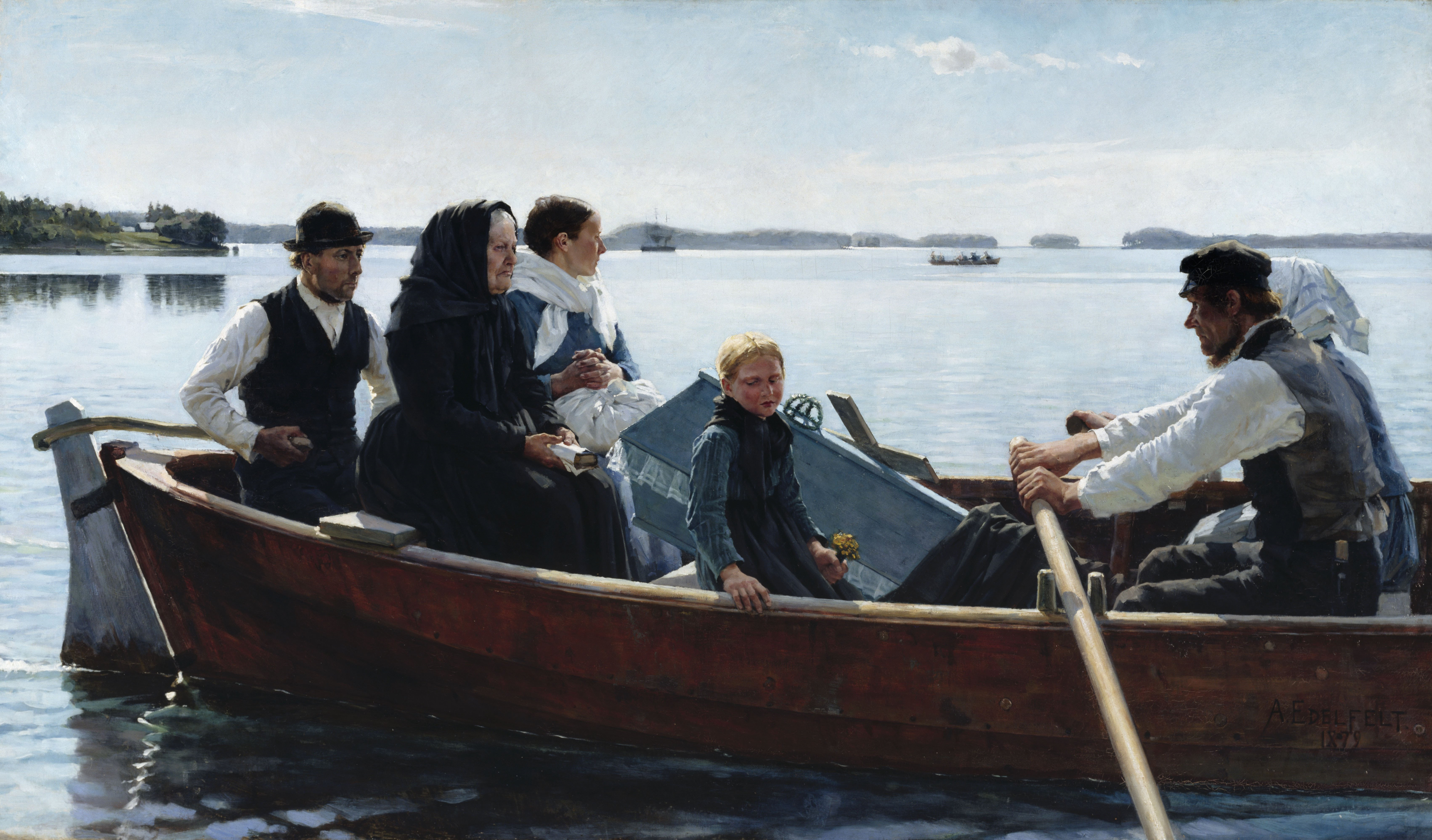
- Artist: Albert Edelfelt
- Year: 1879
- Dimensions: 120 cm × 204 cm (47 in × 80 in)
- Location: Ateneum; Helsinki

Conveying the Child's Coffin (A Child's Funeral) is a painting by Finnish painter Albert Edelfelt completed in 1879.

The painting depicts a rowing boat on the sea outside Haiko, Porvoo in Finland on a sunny late summer morning. In the foreground the brown-tarred rowing boat contains three peasant women, two men and a girl and a coffin.

The painting is in Ateneum in Helsinki, Finland.
