= Enckell =

Enckell is a Finnish-Swedish surname. Notable people with the surname include:

- Annina Enckell (born 1957), Finnish award-winning playwright and screenwriter
- Carl Enckell (1839–1921), Finnish infantry general
- Carl Enckell (1876–1959), Finnish politician, diplomat, officer and businessman
- Magnus Enckell (1870–1925), Finnish symbolist painter
- Nikolai Enckell (1833–1916), Finnish major general
- Otto Ferdinand Enckell (1829–1907), Finnish lieutenant general
- Oscar Enckell (1878–1960), Finnish lieutenant general
- Rabbe Enckell (1903–1974), Finnish author, writer and poet
- Ralph Enckell (1913–2001), Finnish diplomat
- Wilhelm Enckell (born 1990), Finnish actor
