= Carl-Johan Häggman =

Finnish composer and musician

Carl-Johan Häggman (born 22 February 1963 Helsinki) (also called: Carl Johan Haggman or "Haggis") is a Finnish composer, musician and multi-artist. He has also been working as a journalist for example at YLE (The Finnish Broadcasting Company). He has often worked together with his artist wife, the choreographer and director Marja Merisalo in different productions.

Häggman is specialized in various ethnic percussion and film music compositions. After studying philosophy at Helsinki University he made music trips to Turkey, the Caribbean, South America and Greenland, which resulted in music studies and program series in the Finnish radio. Häggman has been collaborating with numerous dancers, actors and directors in many theaters and institutes in Finland (Finnish National Theatre, Helsinki City Theatre, Q-teatteri, Raatikko, Sibelius Academy etc.) as well as internationally.

His music has been heard in many theater plays as well as dance productions and films. One of the later works include music for two documentary films by film director Lasse Naukkarinen, one about the unique original Karelian village Paanajärvi and the other about the state of Kerala in South India. Häggman has also acted in Finnish TV and feature films as well as touring around Finland with theater plays for both adults and children. He has been working at the YLE (Finnish Broadcasting Corporation) making ethnomusical documentaries and other programs for the radio. He also plays in different world music, jazz and other orchestras as a musician. He has also taken part in many international projects, one of them being the TEV-theater that has toured all around the world. (for example at New York Fringe Festival 2009).

== Some film projects and music recordings ==
- DVD: The Rasmus: Live 2012 / vol 2 (as editor) 2013
- CD: SPC Steelband: Sensitive Saguaro (as musician) 2011
- Documentary film: South-Indian Thali Etelä-Intian Thali, director Lasse Naukkarinen (as composer) 2007
- Documentary film: Anni from Paanajärvi, Paanajärven Anni, director Lasse Naukkarinen (as composer) 2006
- CD: Don Johnson Big Band: Private Intentions (as percussionist) 2006
- Fiction movie: Pelicanman (Pelikaanimies), director Liisa Helminen (as musician) 2004
- Fiction movie: Umur, director: Kai Lehtinen (as composer) 2004
- CD: Alhaji Dan with Nakhit Silmillah (as musician) 2002
- CD: Vem ska trösta Knyttet (as musician) 1999
- CD: Kuka lohduttaisi Nyytiä (as musician) 2000
- Fiction movie: Hermit Crab, Erakkorapu, director Kai Lehtinen (as composer) 1999
- CD: Porvookantaatti, City of Porvoo 650-years anniversary cantata, Finland (as musician) 1996
- C-cassette release only: Toni Edelmann: Lauluja Putikosta ja Punkaharjulta (as musician) 1993
- Fiction movie: Sateen Jälkeen, director Kiti Luostarinen (as musician) 1992
- Fiction movie: Kuulin äänen, director Kiti Luostarinen ja Toni Edelmann (as musician) 1990
- LP: Ahmatova, music from the TV-feature Kuulin äänen (as musician) 1989
