= Pääkkönen =

Finnish surname

Pääkkönen is a Finnish surname. Notable people with the surname include:

- Jasper Pääkkönen (born 1980), Finnish television and film actor and film producer
- Lasse Paakkonen (born 1986), Finnish Olympic cross country skier
- Seppo Pääkkönen (born 1957), Finnish actor

== See also ==
- Murder of Urban Höglin and Heidi Paakkonen
