= Kaukola Ridge at Sunset =

Painting by Albert Edelfelt

- Kaukola ås i solnedgång (Swedish), Kaukolanharju auringonlaskun aikaan (Finnish)
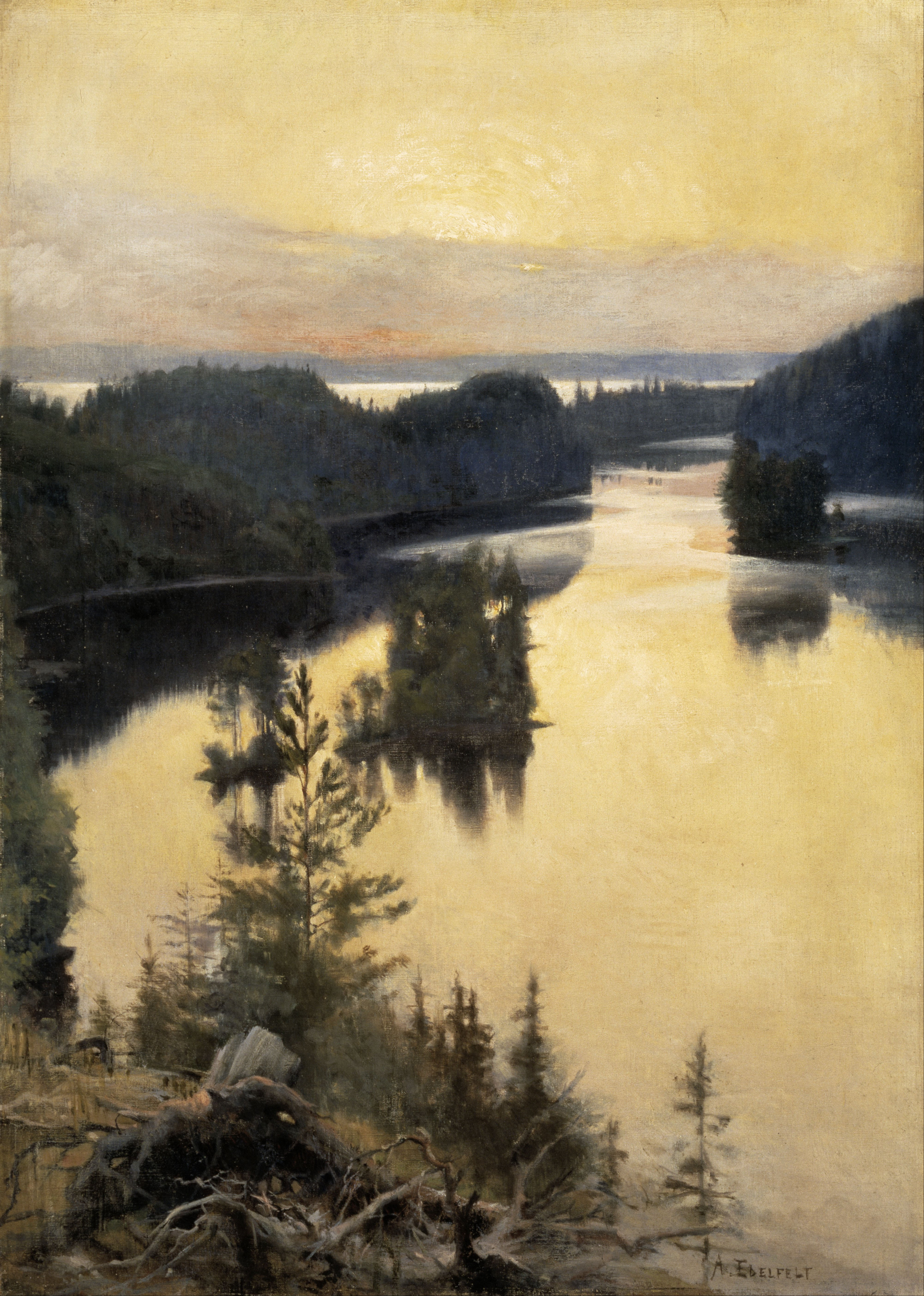
- Artist: Albert Edelfelt
- Year: 1890
- Medium: oil on canvas
- Dimensions: 116.5 cm × 83 cm (45.9 in × 33 in)
- Location: Ateneum, Helsinki
- Website: www.kansallisgalleria.fi/en/object/482255

Kaukola Ridge at Sunset is a painting by Finnish painter Albert Edelfelt completed in 1890.

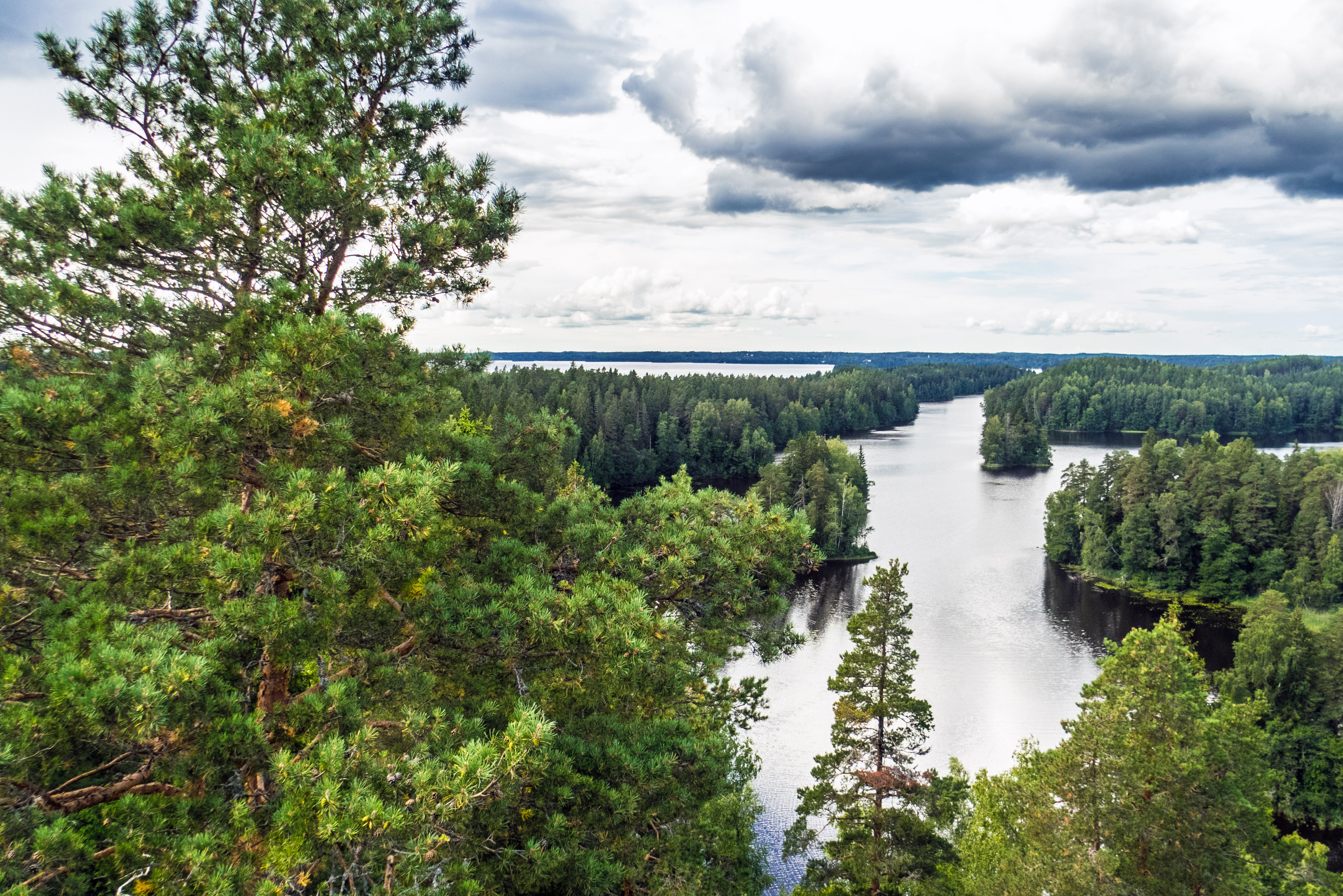
View from observation tower on Kaukolanharju in 2018

The painting depicts the view of a mirror-like lake at sunset in Finland. In the foreground are some young pines and a half-uprooted stump. In the middle is a bay with wooded islets. To the left, a ridge runs diagonally across the picture.

Edelfelt painted the picture from June to July 1889 in Tammela, Tavastia, at Saari's estate – owned by the family of his wife, Ellan de la Chapelle. The view is from Kaukolanharju ridge, North West of the straight between Pyhäjärvi and Kuivajärvi.

The painting is on display at Ateneum in Helsinki, Finland.
