= Boys Playing on the Shore =

Painting by Albert Edelfelt

- Lekande pojkar på stranden (Swedish), Leikkiviä poikia rannalla (Finnish)
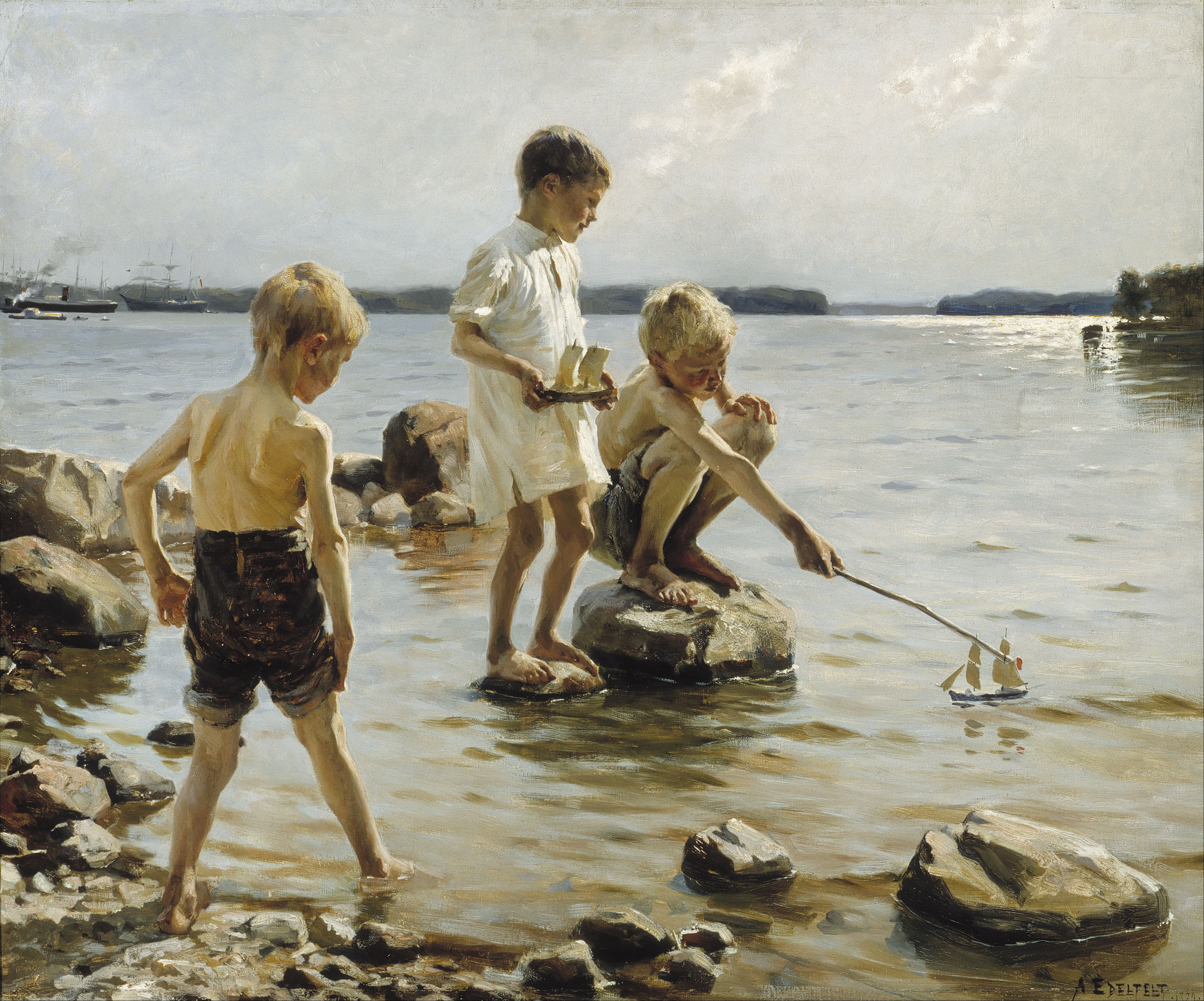
- Artist: Albert Edelfelt
- Year: 1884
- Medium: oil on canvas
- Dimensions: 90 cm × 107.5 cm (35 in × 42.3 in)
- Location: Ateneum, Helsinki
- Website: www.kansallisgalleria.fi/en/object/431018

Boys Playing on the Shore (also Children Playing on the Shore) is a painting by Finnish painter Albert Edelfelt completed in 1884.

The painting depicts three boys playing on a shore with a self-made bark boat.

Albert Edelfelt painted the picture in Haikko, Porvoo, Finland from August to October in 1884. The painting was meant to be put on display in Stockholm in 1885, but this did not occur. The painting was bought from the Galerie Georges Petit in Paris for 5 000 francs by Count Wladimir Scheremetjeff for Empress Maria Feodorovna. It was bought in 1930 in Leningrad by art dealer W. Sjöberg from Helsinki and then sold to the Ateneum for 85 000 marks.

The painting is on display at the Ateneum in Helsinki, Finland.

== Studies ==
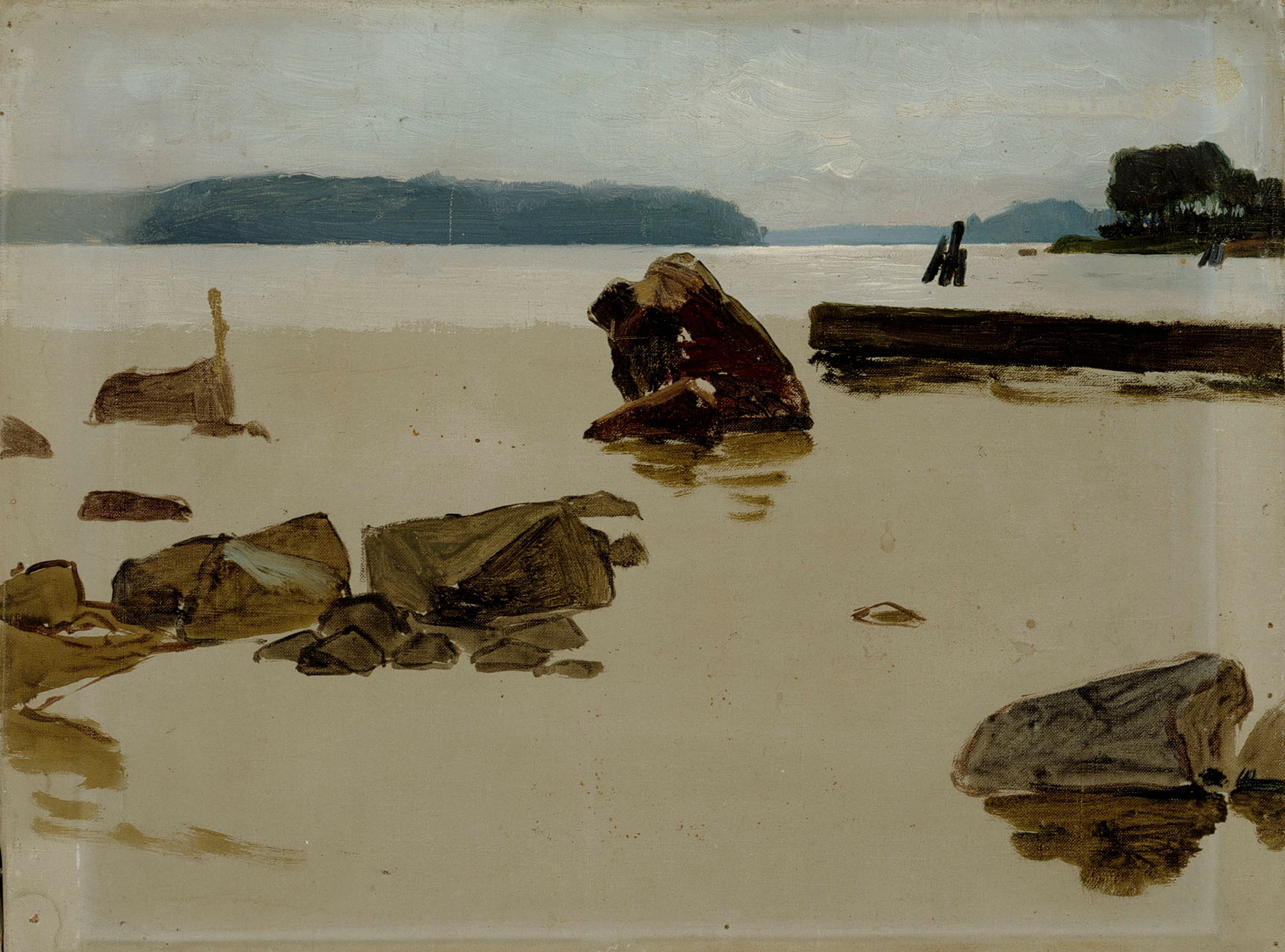
Open sea off Haikko, a study for Boys Playing on the Shore

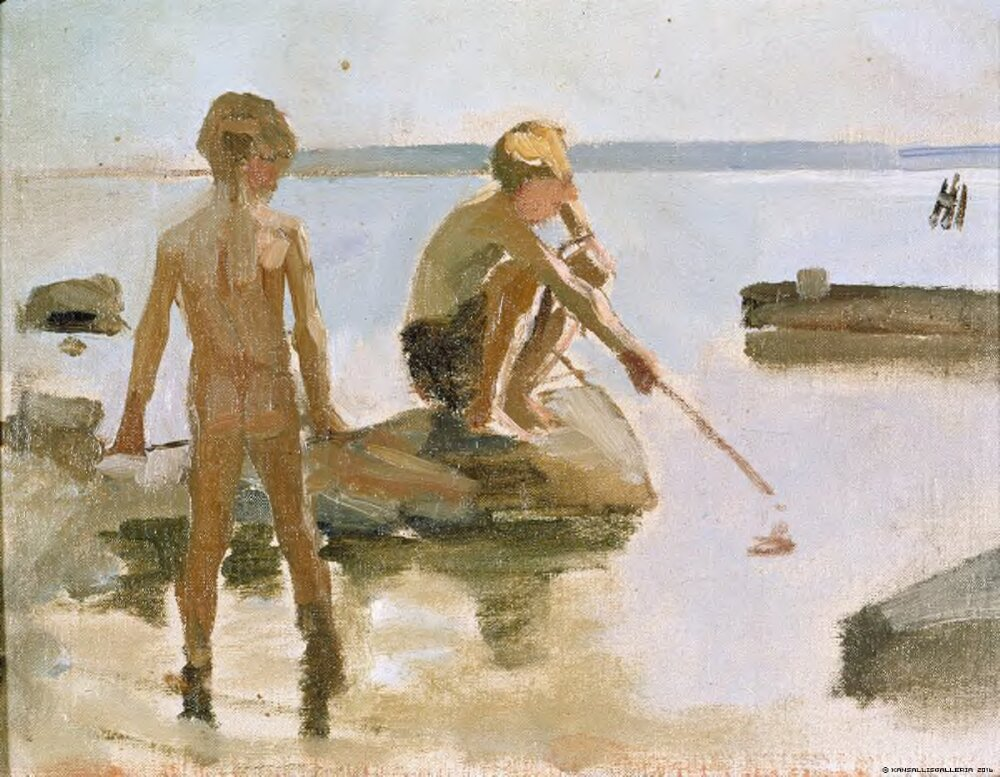
Sketch for Boys Playing on the Shore

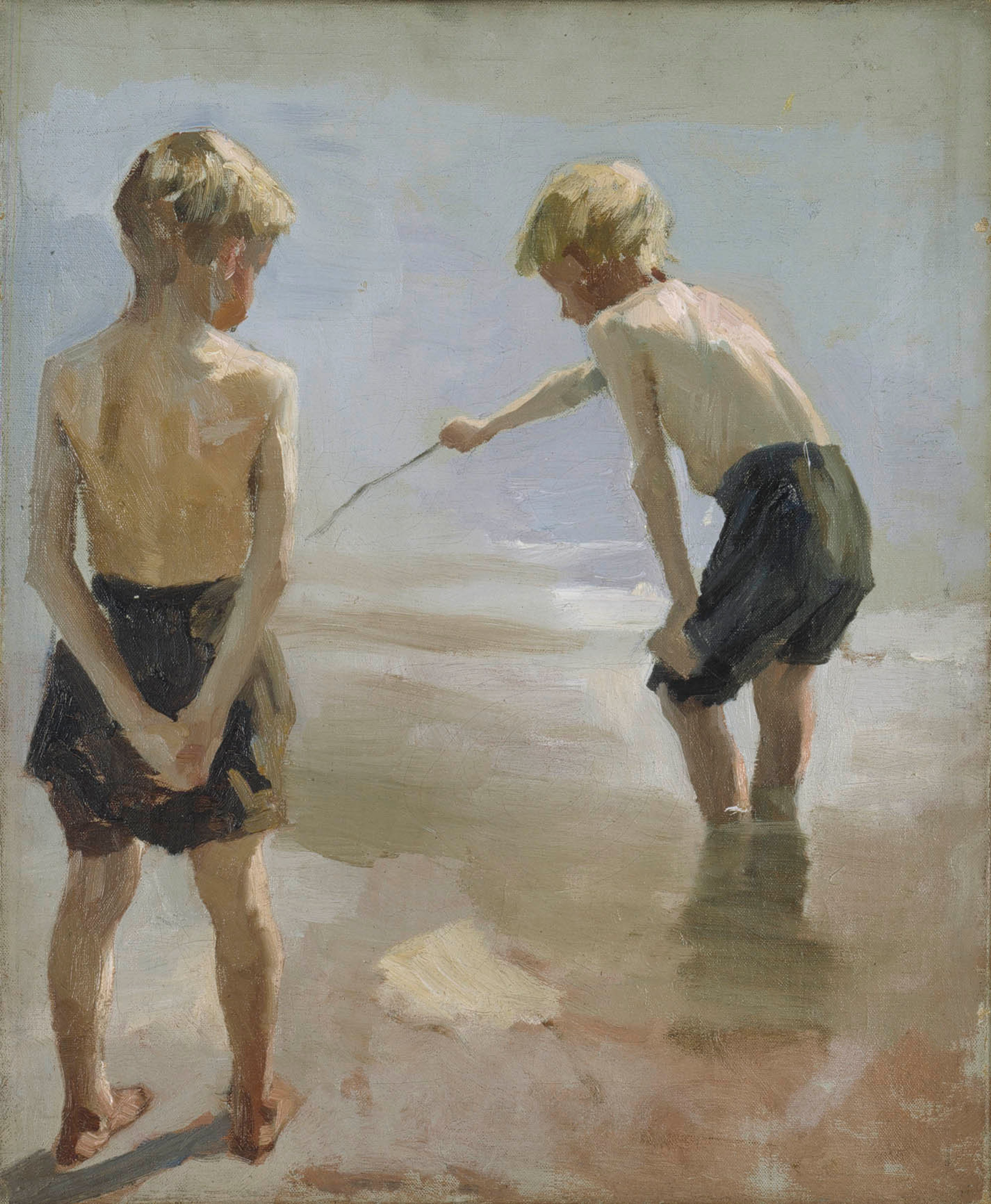
Study for Boys Playing on the Shore
