= Parisian Backyard =

Painting by Akseli Gallen-Kallela

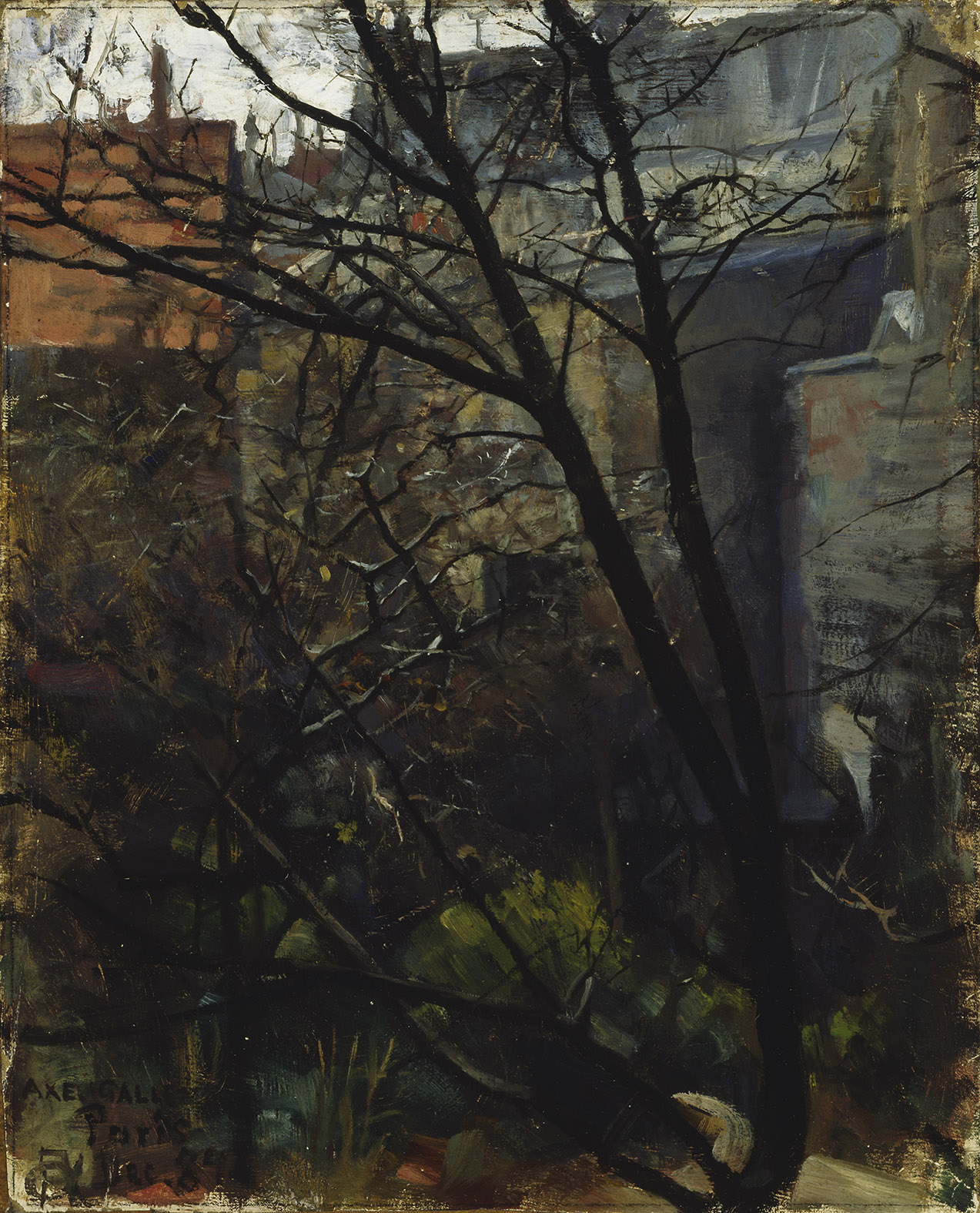
- Artist: Akseli Gallen-Kallela
- Year: 1884
- Medium: Oil on canvas
- Dimensions: 28 cm × 23 cm (11 in × 9.1 in)
- Location: Ateneum, Helsinki

Parisian Backyard is an oil-on-canvas painting executed in 1884 by Finnish artist Akseli Gallen-Kallela. The work is 28 × 23 cm in size and belongs to the Ateneum, part of the Finnish National Gallery in Helsinki, where it was donated in 1945.

== History and description ==
The Parisian Backyard is a work of Gallen-Kallela's first trip to Paris, in the autumn of 1884. He visited it on a study trip. There he painted some academic works as part of his studies, as well as other paintings such as the Parisian Backyard. He made the painting from the window of his living room at the Rue Fontaine 21, and behind it he later wrote, "Painted in December while I was sick and in great dullness."

In the painting, Gallen-Kallela is particularly sensitive to the perception of light. In the foreground of the late autumn landscape stands a dark, leafless tree. Behind it stand the dirty-gray brick neighboring buildings and a mere patch of white sky visible at the top left of the painting.
