= Moomins on the Riviera =

2014 animated comedy film

- Finnish theatrical release poster
- Directed by: Xavier Picard
- Written by: Leslie Stewart; Annina Enckell; Hanna Hemilä; Xavier Picard; Beata Harju
- Based on: Moomin by: Tove Jansson; Lars Jansson
- Produced by: Hanna Hemilä
- Starring: Russell Tovey; Nathaniel Parker; Tracy-Ann Oberman; Stephanie Winiecki; Ruth Gibson; Philippe Smolikowski; Dave Browne; Shelley Blond
- Cinematography: Xavier Picard
- Edited by: Thomas Belair; Rodolphe Ploquin
- Music by: Panu Aaltio; Jean de Aguiar; Anna-Karin Korhonen; Timo Lassy; Milla Viljamaa
- Production companies: Handle Productions; Pictak Cie; Sandman Animation Studio; Moomin Characters
- Distributed by: Nordisk Film (Finland); Gebeka Films (France)
- Release dates: 10 October 2014 (Finland); 4 February 2015 (France)
- Running time: 80 minutes
- Countries: France; Finland
- Languages: English; Finnish
- Budget: €3.6 million (US$4 million)
- Box office: $2.2 million

Moomins on the Riviera (Finnish title: Muumit Rivieralla) is a 2014 animated family comedy film directed by Xavier Picard and produced by Hanna Hemilä, who is also co-director. The film is based on Moomin comic strips by Tove Jansson and Lars Jansson.

The film is a co-production of Finland's Handle Productions, France's Pictak Cie and China's Sandman Animation Studio. Written by Leslie Stewart, Annina Enckell, Hanna Hemilä, Xavier Picard and Beata Harju, the English version of the film stars Russell Tovey as Moomin, Nathaniel Parker as Moominpappa and Tracy-Ann Oberman as Moominmamma. The film is based on the Moomin Tove Jansson's original comic strip: Moomin on the Riviera and it is the first animated feature based on the comic strips.

In the film, the Moomins along with Snorkmaiden and Little My sail for the Riviera, where their unity is threatened. Snorkmaiden is dazzled by the attentions of the playboy Clark Tresco and Moominpappa befriends an aristocrat called Marquis Mongaga, while Moomin and Moominmamma decide to move to the beach in order to escape all the glamorous extravagance. Moomins on the Riviera was released theatrically on 10 October 2014 in Finland to celebrate the 100th anniversary of Tove Jansson's birth. In the United Kingdom, the film made its premiere on 11 October 2014 at BFI London Film Festival and it had a wider theatrical release on 22 May 2015. The film also aired on Cartoon Network.

== Plot ==
At night, while the Moomin family and residents of Moominvalley enjoy a party around a bonfire atop a cliffside, a pirate ship mistaking the blaze for a lighthouse crashes into rocks at sea, forcing the crew to abandon ship and their hostages, Mymble and Little My.

The next morning, Moomintroll is stuck between deciding to help Moominmamma with washing, going fishing with Snufkin and acting out a scene with Snorkmaiden, wishing he knew how to say no to others. While acting out the scene, Moomintroll spots Mymble struggling to swim ashore and dives into the ocean to save her from drowning. Spotting the shipwreck, the Moomins decide to go and salvage what they can, taking a mirror, books, a chest of tropical seeds and several crates of fireworks, but leaving the chest of gold. Little My follows the family home from the ship on the back of a shark. The pirates follow the family back to Moominhouse, but leave after discovering their gold is still on the ship, which has begun to sink.

At night, Snorkmaiden suggests going to the Riviera after reading a magazine with her idol, Audrey Glamour. The Moomins, Snorkmaiden and Little My set sail, but get lost in a storm and wind up on a deserted island. A box floats ashore containing thousands of bugs uttering insults and bad language, which the group gathers into a bag to take with them. At night, Snorkmaiden notices the lights of the Riviera not too far away, and the family arrive the next morning.

While exploring the town, the family arrive at The Grand, the Riviera's resort hotel. Moominpappa introduces the family as "DeMoomin of Moominvalley", and are offered the Royal Suite to stay in. The family struggles to fit in among the affluent residents, but Moominpappa soon becomes friends with Marquis Mongaga, an artist who admires his bohemian eccentricity, and Snorkmaiden begins to spend her time with Audrey Glamour and playboy Clark Tresco, much to Moomintroll's displeasure. Moomintroll and Moominmamma, both feeling that they don't fit into the rich lifestyle, decide to go and live under their boat on the beach.

Mongaga invites Moominpappa to his mansion where he shows him his art, consisting of walking elephant sculptures, and admits to him that he would gladly give up his rich lifestyle to live a bohemian lifestyle. After pushing the statue of the town governor into the river and replacing it with one of the elephant statues, Mongaga comes to temporarily live with the Moomin family at the beach, where he carves more of his sculptures, and inspires Moomintroll to create a sculpture of his own. After sleeping rough and being attacked by a resident's dogs, Mongaga decides to depart back to his home, thanking the Moomins' for their hospitality and leaving his statues as a parting gift.

Moomintroll, fed up with seeing Clark with Snorkmaiden, challenges him to a duel for Snorkmaiden's love the next morning. While not adept with the sword, Moomintroll triumphs after bashing Clark on the head with the hilt. The directors of the hotel decide to evict the Moomin family as their eccentricity has made the reputation of the hotel suffer. Ordered to pay for their stay with a hefty bill, the family try to pay with Mongaga's elephant statues, which are deemed worthless because so many of them exist. Snorkmaiden decides to use her stashed casino winnings to pay their bill. Her money greatly exceeds the amount of the bill, but she allows the hotel to keep the money. That evening, Snorkmaiden finds Moomintroll 's statue, a sculpture of her as a mermaid, and the two embrace.

Moominpappa decides to give homes to Mongaga's elephant statues, and Moominmamma opens her tropical rock garden to the public. Upon arriving at the town hall with a statue, the Mayor realises that Moominpappa was responsible for pushing the Governor's statue into the river and orders his arrest. After being chased through the town by the police, Moominpappa and the rest of the family quickly set sail. Moominmamma releases the bugs from the bag to halt the officers, which swarm over the town with a plague of insults and bad language, causing fights among the residents.

The Moomin family get caught in a storm on their way back to Moominvalley, and decide to jettison some of their pots of tropical plants to lighten the load, inadvertently including Moomintroll's statue. Lost in the fog, with the plants still on board having overgrown into full trees, the family are found and brought back to land by Snufkin. The family go back to their peaceful lives in Moominvalley, and Moomintroll and Snorkmaiden embrace on the cliffside while flying kites with Mymble and Little My.

== Cast ==
Role	English version	Finnish and Swedish versions
Moomin	Russell Tovey	Kris Gummerus
Moominpappa	Nathaniel Parker	Mats Långbacka
Moominmamma	Tracy-Ann Oberman	Maria Sid
Snorkmaiden	Stephanie Winiecki	Alma Pöysti
Little My	Ruth Gibson	Ragni Grönblom
Marquis Mongaga	Philippe Smolikowski	Carl-Kristian Rundman
Clark Tresco	Dave Browne	Christoffer Strandberg
Audrey Glamour	Shelley Blond	Irina Björklund
Snufkin	Dominic Frisby	C. G. Wentzel
The Mymble's Daughter	Alison O'Donnell	Beata Harju

The Finnish and Swedish dubs of the film were both cast with the same actors.

Additional roles from the English version of the film are played by Dominic Frisby, who also co-directed the English dialogue, Ian Conningham, Alison O’Donnell, Bernard Alane, Bruno Magnes, Andy Turvey, Kris Gummerus, Glyn Welden Banks, Lee Willis, Sanna-June Hyde, Christopher Sloan and Leslie Hyde. Maria Sid and Beata Harju, who provide voices for Moominmamma and the Mymble in the Finnish and Swedish version, also voice minor roles in the English version.

== Production ==
According to Sophia Jansson, the company had been careful with giving the rights to new film adaptions about the Moomins for years. When the participation rights with the Telescreen expired, Sophia Jansson became interested in the idea of animated film based on the Moomin comic strip story. Producer Hanna Hemilä, who is Sophia's close friend, told Sophia about French animation director Xavier Picard, who was interested to adapt comic strips to the big screen. They contacted Picard and the film started production in France in 2010. The film is animated traditionally, hand drawn animation with a reduced color scale for the backgrounds in order to maintain continuity with the black-and-white comic strips. Pictak Cie worked on developing the visuals of the film. Chinese Sandman Animation Studio did 120,000 drawings for animation, and Handle Productions produced the film. The film marks the feature film directorial debut of Xavier Picard. Picard was not aware of the Moomin characters before he discovered them 20 years ago in Japan, but he has been particularly fascinated by comic strips and has stated to want translate the art of Tove Jansson into animation. The Finnish voice cast of the film was confirmed in August 2014 featuring Maria Sid as Moominmamma, while the English voice cast was confirmed in a September 2014 press announcement. The film's score was composed by many Finnish and French composers, including Jean de Aguiar, Panu Aaltio, Timo Lassy, Milla Viljamaa and Anna-Karin Korhonen. The film stays faithful to Tove Jansson's original story in the original comic strip, with the addition of a few characters and story lines: Little My and Snufkin, have been added to the film, in addition to some other characters from the Moomin comic strip. While the production crew felt that the Riviera is fun and dramatic setting, they have also added a side story at the beginning of the film, that takes place in Moominvalley, and where Moomins got their idea for the sea voyage. The reason for this was to introduce the dwelling place of the Moomins for the international audience. Sophia Jansson herself approved the change.

== Release ==
The theme song for the Japanese version of the film is "Eye" by Kaela Kimura.

Moomins on the Riviera was released on 10 October 2014 in Finland to celebrate the 100th anniversary of Tove Jansson's birth, and on 31 October 2014 in Sweden. In France, the film was released on 4 February 2015. Indie Sales acquired the release rights for the Toronto International Film Festival and in addition, the film was sold to other countries, including Switzerland and Japan. For the UK theatrical release, the film made its premiere on 11 October 2014 at the BFI London Film Festival. The film had a wider theatrical release in UK for 22 May 2015 that was distributed by Vertigo Films. In February 2015, the film was confirmed to be featured on New York International Children's Film Festival.

A Region 2 home video edition of Moomins on the Riviera was released on February 11, 2015 on DVD and Blu-ray in Finland. The film was released on DVD on September 28, 2015, in United Kingdom, The film was reissued on DVD for its 10th anniversary on 2024 by GKids in United States.

== Reception ==
=== Critical response ===
From BFI London Film Festival screening, Matt Micucci of CineCola praised the film's screenplay and soundtrack, calling it "a smart and surprisingly quick witted film as well as the perfect tribute to a celebrated and much loved comic strip that has the potential of winning it an even greater and more international audience". Sara Steensig of GBTimes was enthusiastic towards the film despite pointing out of Moominpappa's painful hangover and Moomintroll's bitter jealousy, but she notes after that "These are phenomena that adults will recognize but most children will not, and they are shown in a way that will not make young kids wonder about things they are not ready for."

=== Box office ===
As of October 26, 2014, Moomins on the Riviera grossed $1,381,862 in Finland. The film first earned $337,391 (28,500 viewers) on its first weekend, surpassing The Grump, and became the highest-grossing film during its first two weekends in Finland.

=== Accolades ===
Award	Category	Nominee	Result
Golden Goblet Award	Best Animation Film	Xavier Picard	Nominated

== TV series ==
In an October 2014 blog article at Screen Daily, Sophia Jansson stated that the film's "artistic team has made an effort to be true to the original drawings and the original text", and it is hinted that Jansson is now in discussions with various parties for a new, similarly animated television series. This has led to the 2019 television series Moominvalley, a CGI-animated show.
