= Aleksander Lauréus =

Finnish painter

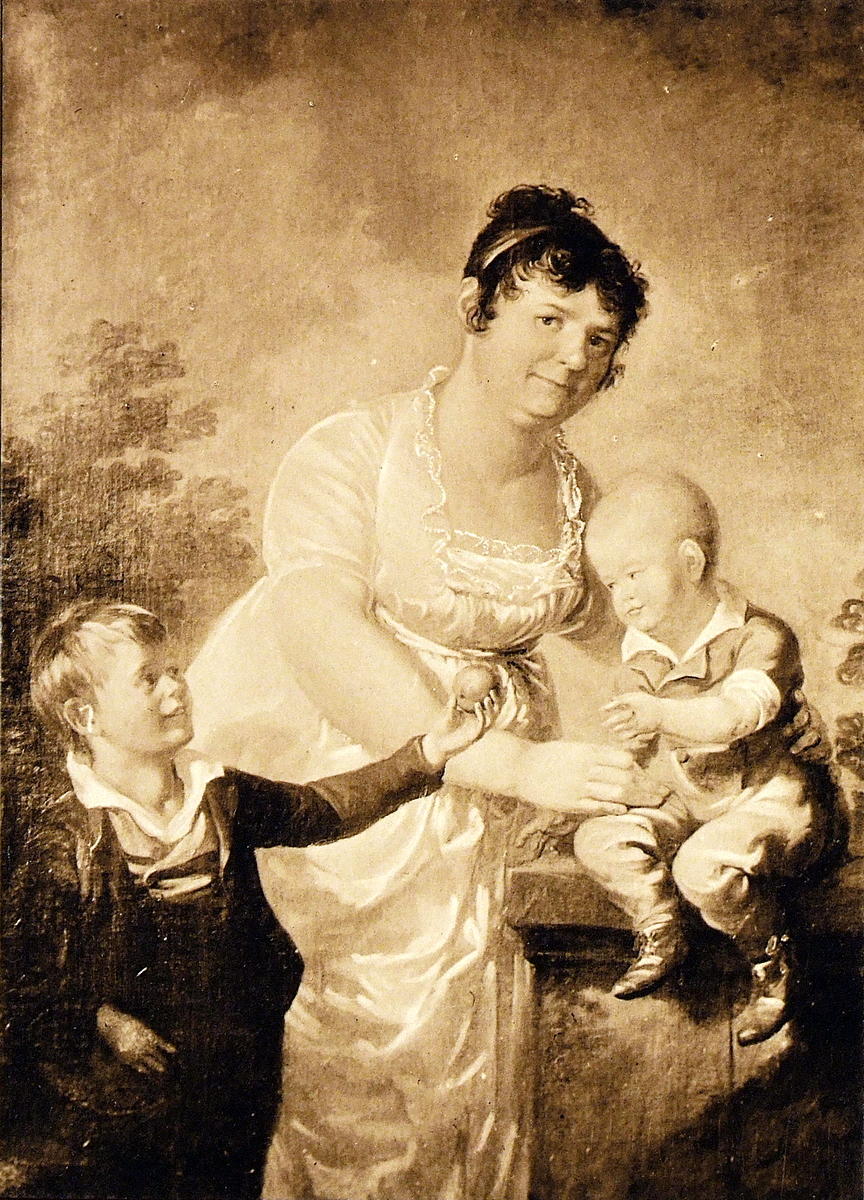
Portraits of artist's stepmother Mariana Juliana Winqvist and her two sons by Aleksander Lauréus, Finnish National Gallery

Aleksander Lauréus, also Alexander Lauraeus, (4 January 1783 – 21 October 1823) was a Finnish painter.

== Family ==
Lauréus was born in Turku to Lovisa Ulrika and Alexander Laureus, a Doctor of Theology, and was named after his paternal grandfather. Lauréus had at least 14 siblings, of which he was the second-born. His mother died in childbirth in 1794 after the seventh child was born. His father remarried to Maria Juliana Vinqvistin.

== Early life ==
Lauréus was 11 years old when he started school in Turku Cathedral School and graduated from high school in 1800. At that time he was interested Jean-Jacques Rousseau's books. He studied at the drawing school in Turku, probably 1800–1802, when the teacher was Johan Erik Hedberg. In 1802 Laureus Turku Province Baron Olof Vibeliuksen lead a fundraising that raised 195 krones for a scholarship for Lauréus to attend the Royal Swedish Academy of Arts in Stockholm to study.

Director at the time was Lorens Pasch the Younger, and was taught by among others, Johan Tobias Sergel, Louis Masreliez, Carl Frederik von Breda and Pehr Hilleström. In the period 1804–1805 he studied at the upper primary level. He collected a 50 krone Drawing Prize, which allowed him travel home to Turku, and perhaps also to Åland.

== Career ==
Lauréus painted his father and stepmother's portraits. He left Finland when it was annexed from Russia in 1809 and it became the Grand Duchy of Finland. He became a royal court painter in 1811, and a became a member of the Academy of Fine Arts, Helsinki in 1812, and he worked for some time as a teacher at the Royal Swedish Academy of Arts in Stockholm. In 1817 he was awarded a three-year scholarship to travel, so he left in September with Margaret to Paris. The trip took three months. In Paris, he studied at Pierre-Narcisse Guérin's studio from 1817 to 1820. In 1820 they traveled to Italy and Rome. Laureus fell ill 9 October 1823 and died on 21 October.

== Works ==
Few paintings from his Paris trip survived, but the Roman period works are more abundant. Lauréus' paintings were exhibited as a special collection in Italy, Milan and Rome in 1937. His works can be found in many notable museums, including the Ateneum, the Turku, Tampere and Imatra art museums, the Nationalmuseum, the Gothenburg Museum of Art, the Stockholm City Museum, and the National Gallery of Norway.
