= Marja Merisalo =

Finnish choreographer, dancer and director (born 1965)

Marja Merisalo (born on 3 April 1965 Oulu, Finland) is a Finnish choreographer, dancer, director and cultural coordinator. She has the Master of Arts degree in Dance from the Helsinki Theatre Academy (Teatterikorkeakoulu) She represents contemporary art dance where she has developed her own styles. Marja Merisalo has worked as a choreographer, dancer, actor, producer as well as a director of theatre and dance projects. She has worked in numerous productions and theatres since 1982, including Q-teatteri in Helsinki, Helsinki City Theatre, the Student's Theatre of Helsinki (Ylioppilasteatteri) and the Finnish National Theatre.

Merisalo worked in the city of Pori as the Regional Artist under the Ministry of Education and Culture during the years 2009–2011. Her main work was coordinating numerous cultural activities in the municipality of Satakunta in western Finland. Later on, she also made project-planning for an artist's network called ArtPeople in Helsinki during her work as cultural coordinator in the area of Arabia in Helsinki under Arts Promotion Centre Finland (Taiteen edistämiskeskus, formerly Arts Council of Finland).

Since 2006, Merisalo has been a member of the Theatre of Eternal Values (TEV), an international theatre group based in Italy. She has been touring with the group's productions internationally in West End – London, Manhattan – New York City, Milan, Rome, Geneva, Basel, Istanbul and Ankara. Moreover, besides Finland, she has also performed internationally in Australia, India, Sweden, the Baltic countries and Russia.

She has also created numerous dance and theatre projects, one of the latest being "Echoes from Karelia", which brings together a fusion of traditional Karelian folk culture with modern elements. The project has toured in Finland, Sweden, Russia and Italy.

== Choreographies ==
- GAM, Tana bru, Norway 2023 (dance theatre project together with Sami children)
- Ilmatar in India, Sortavala, Russia 2019 (residence project in KARN, Karelian Art Residence Network)
- Echoes from Karelia, Zelenogorsk and Sortavala, Russia 2015 and 2019, Sweden 2016, Italy 2018
- Tid och Energi, Vantaa 2008, Pori 2011.
- The Tyger, London 2007, Genova, Italy 2007. (also: Govisummer 2007 program)
- Adimaya, Sydney, Australia 2006.
- Elefanttimetsä ("Elephant Forest"), Dance Theatre Raatikko, Finland 2004.
- O Lal Meri, Italy 2004.
- Mahamaya, Mumbai, India 2003, Italy 2003.
- Gypsies Are Found Near Heaven – "Mustalaisleiri muuttaa taivaaseen", Lappeenranta City Theatre, Finland 1997.
- Spring is coming – Kevät saapuu, Finlandia Hall 1995.

== Productions ==
- Tid och Energi, Martinus Concert Hall Vantaa, Finland 2008, Promenadisali Concert Hall, Pori Finland 2011.
- Tuulen poika, Helsinki 2007, Arabia Primary School, Helsinki 2013
- Apinakuningas Hanuman, Keinutie Primary School, Helsinki 2006.
- Zum Zum Zananana, EU Urban II -project 2005.
- Tiikeri tanssii ("The Tiger is Dancing"), Dance Theatre Raatikko, Finland 2003.
- Pikkubussilla alkuräjähdyksestä atomiaikaan, Ateneum, Helsinki 1996 (a co-production with Finnish actress Emilia Pokkinen).
- Ilveilijän testamentti, Ylioppilasteatteri (Helsinki Student's theatre) 1992.
- Theatre of Eternal Values: Eternity in an Hour, Helsinki Festival 2008, Tour in Italy Milan, Rome 2009, Swiss tour Geneva, Basel, 2009 New York Fringe Festival, New York City 2010, Theater Basel 2010, Touring Turkish National Theatres in Istanbul, Ankara and Bursa 2011.
- Theatre of Eternal Values: William Blake's Divine Humanity, New Player's Theatre, West End, London, 2007.
- Helsinki Theatre Academy: Paalu, 1994.
- Ylioppilasteatteri: Ilveilijän testamentti, 1992.
- Ylioppilasteatteri: Vanja-eno, 1992.
- Q-teatteri: Sudenhetki, Helsinki 1990.
- Finnish National Theatre: Kullervo´s Story, 1989.
- Ylioppilasteatteri: Zoo, 1989.
- Helsinki City Theatre: Kalevala, 1985.

== Sources ==
- Helsinki City Theatre, list of performances (also: and )
- Milliyet-newpper blog 2011, Turkey (also:)
- Zaman-newspaper, Turkey (also: )
- Bursakultur, Türkiye (also:)
- Bugünbugece Istanbul
- biggistanbul kültür (also: )
- Theater Basel
- The Happiest Medium theatre review, New York (also:)
- New York Theatre Review (also:)
- The FringeNYC festival
- The FringeNYC festival program 2010 (also: and:)
- TEV-theatre at New York Fringe festival (also: )
- Eternity in an Hour (also:)
- Biography in English (TEV Members) (also:)
- – as cultural coordinator in Helsinki(also:)
- Artova.fi (also:)
- Tuulen Poika -performances in Arabia(also:)
- Art Coordinator´s blog (also:)
- Kopiosto (CV)
- Danceinfo (also:)
- London Theatre Database
- Indielondon (also: webcitation.org)
- The Stage listings – UK (also:)
- This is London, reviews
- Helsinki Student´s theatre (Ylioppilasteatteri)
- City of Pori News
- Satakunnan taidetoimikunta, läänintaiteilijat – Regional artists of Satakunta, Finland
- Taiteen edistämiskeskus – Arts Council of Finland (also:)
- Taiteen Edistämiskeskus – Arts Council of Finland – "Ilon ja Valon Satakunta" -festival (also:)
- Ilon ja valon satakunta (also: Ilon ja Valon viikolle vauhdikas alku – Uusi aika -newspaper 11 March 2010, also: Iloa ja Valoa tänä vuonna lasten silmin – Satakunnan kansa -newspaper 2010)
- Q-teatteri history (also:)
- Dance Theatre Raatikko performances during 2000´s (also:)
