= Beata Harju =

Finnish-born actress and filmmaker (born 1990)

- Born: May 1990 (age 35–36); Helsinki, Finland
- Occupations: Screenwriter, filmmaker, actress, voiceover artist
- Years active: 1994–present

Beata Harju (born in May, 1990) is a Finnish-born actress and filmmaker. Her most notable filmmaking credits include screenwriter and Mymble for Moomins on the Riviera (2014), based on Tove Jansson's comic strips, and assistant director for the 24-episode TV-series Tommys Supersoffa (2013). In 2011, Beata and her fellow filmmakers won Duran Duran’s worldwide Genero.TV competition, becoming the official music video of their single, "Safe: In the Heat of the Moment". She made her national theatre acting debut in 2012 as Honey in Who's Afraid of Virginia Woolf? and Jane in August: Osage County at Svenska Teatern, the Swedish National Theatre, in Helsinki, Finland. In Moomins on the Riviera, Beata plays the Mymble in Finnish and Swedish, and the Ship's Cat and Maid in the British English version.

Beata is an alumnus of Sarah Lawrence College and the Professional Performing Arts School in New York, as well as Aalto University School of Business in Helsinki, Finland. She received her MFA in Screenwriting from the American Film Institute Conservatory in 2019.
