= Paavo, a Life in Five Courses =

2010 film by Hanna Hemilä

- Finnish: Paavo, viisi annosta elämää
- Swedish: Paavo, fem rätter och ett liv
- Directed by: Hanna Hemilä
- Written by: Hanna Hemilä
- Produced by: Hanna Hemilä
- Release date: 2010
- Countries: Finland; United States
- Languages: English; Swedish

Paavo, a Life in Five Courses (Finnish: Paavo, viisi annosta elämää, Swedish: Paavo, fem rätter och ett liv) is a 2010 Finnish-American documentary film directed, produced and written by Hanna Hemilä. Shot in New York City, Finland and Sweden, the documentary follows the life of internationally acclaimed chef and event planner Paavo Turtiainen.

== Synopsis ==
Finnish farm boy Paavo Turtiainen is hired into the Parisian household of Swedish theatre producer Lars Schmidt and his wife, actress Ingrid Bergman. The couple "adopt" and train Turtiainen to navigate among the rich and famous. Encouraged by Schmidt, Turtiainen moves to New York and becomes an acclaimed chef and event planner for high society. Along the way, Turtiainen learns to stand on his own feet. In the film Bergman's daughters Isabella Rossellini and Pia Lindström talk about their "brother" and Schmidt's son Kristian describes how it was growing up with Turtiainen. In contrast to hectic New York, we spend time in the relaxing Swedish archipelago, watch Turtiainen pick mushrooms in the Finnish forests and visit the railway station in the tiny Finnish town of Karis, where Turtiainen first encountered Bergman – on a magazine cover.
