= Jussi Lampi =

Finnish musician and actor (born 1961)

- Born: 9 February 1961 (age 65); Lappajärvi, Finland
- Occupations: Actor; musician
- Height: 6 ft 7 in (2.01 m)
- Spouse: Tuula Lampi
- Children: Mandi Lampi (1988–2008)

Jussi Lampi (born 9 February 1961) is a Finnish actor and musician.

== Life and career ==
Born in Lappajärvi, Lampi has appeared in many films and TV shows, including The Last Border (1993), V2 - jäätynyt enkeli (2007), Matti (2006), Pelikaanimies (2004), Rölli ja metsänhenki (2001), Ansa ja Oiva and Ruusun aika. It is believed that Lampi started his recording career in the band Bodyguards. Lampi has played and is still playing in the band Pink Flamingos since 1993. The band has published one album, Pink Flamingos, through Strawberry Records.

Currently Lampi plays the drums and is a background singer in Timo Rautiainen's band. Lampi is 6 ft 7 in (2.01 m) tall.

Lampi has also worked as a voice actor in the Finnish dubs of Monsters, Inc., The Wild, the first Pokémon film as Mewtwo, and Finding Nemo.

Lampi's daughter was Mandi Lampi, a former famous child actor who died at 19 years of age on 27 February 2008.

== Filmography ==
=== Film ===
- The Last Border (1993)
- Rolli: Amazing Tales (1991)
- Rölli ja metsänhenki (2001)
- V2 – jäätynyt enkeli (2007)
- Matti (2006)
- Pelikaanimies (2004)
- The Flight Before Christmas (voice, 2008)
- Love and Other Troubles (2012)
- Lapua 1976 (2023)

=== TV series ===
- Ruusun aika (1990–1991)
- Ansa ja Oiva (1998–2001)
- Syke (2022–2023)
