= Hanna Hemilä =

Finnish film producer, director and writer

Hanna Hemilä is a Finnish film producer, director and writer. Some of her most notable producing credits include Moomins on the Riviera (2014), Le Havre (film) (2011), Bad Family (film) (2010), Pelikaanimies (2004), and the period film Lapin kullan kimallus (1999). She made her directorial debut with the critically acclaimed documentary feature Paavo, a Life in Five Courses (2010).

== Selected filmography ==
=== Feature films ===
- Moomins on the Riviera, 2014, producer, co-director, co-writer (Shangai International Film Festival competition, BFI London Film Festival)
- Le Havre, 2011, productrice exécutive (Cannes Film Festival competition)
- Bad Family, 2010, line producer (Berlinale)
- Varg, 2008, co-producer (Montreal Film Festival)
- Pelikaanimies, 2004, producer (Berlinale)
- Guarded Secrets, 2004, producer (Cairo International Film Festival - winner best lead actress)
- Lapin kullan kimallus, 1999, producer

=== Documentaries and Tv-series ===
- Tommy's Supersofa, 2013, live action TV-series, producer
- Paavo, a Life in Five Courses, 2010, director, producer, writer
- Tove ja Tooti Euroopassa, 2004, producer
- Tootletubs & Jyro, 2001, stop-motion animation, producer
- Behind the Curtains, 2001, producer
- Urpo & Turpo, Episodes 7-13, 1997, stop-motion animation, producer
- Urpo & Turpo, Episodes 1-6, 1996, stop-motion animation, producer
- Kangaroute, 1996, producer
- Haru, Island of the Solitary, 1994, producer
- The Secret of Urpo & Turpo, 1994, producer
