= Mandi Lampi =

Finnish actress and singer (1988–2008)

Mandi
- Born: Mandi Lampi; 25 October 1988
- Died: 27 February 2008 (aged 19)
- Occupations: Actress, singer
- Parent(s): Jussi Lampi; Tuula Lampi

Mandi Lampi (25 October 1988 – 27 February 2008), known mononymously as Mandi, was a Finnish actress and singer, who played in theatre and released an album. She was the daughter of actor Jussi Lampi and Tuula Lampi.

== Career ==
Mandi appeared in the New Happy Theatre in Linnanmäki in summer 1999. She was known for her music video Miks kaikki kiusaa ("Why is everyone bullying?") and the related campaign to stop school bullying. She released one album, Pieni maailma (1998), featuring songs by Maki, Alex, and Vera from Aikakone, as well as Alex's wife Marja.

Mandi appeared in the Eurovision Song Contest episode of Laulava sydän ("Singing heart"), performing the Eurovision song Pump pump by Fredi. In 2004 she and her father appeared in the Turku Castle Theatre play Älä soita äidille ("Don't call mama").

Mandi Lampi died on 27 February 2008, aged 19. The death was said to be "sudden" by the media; no other details were made public at the time. In February 2009 her mother gave an interview to the Finnish magazine Me Naiset, in which she talked about her daughter, confirming the earlier suspicions that Mandi died by suicide.

== Discography ==
- Pieni maailma ("Small world") (1998)
