= Matti Pulli =

Finnish ski jumping coach

Personal information
- Born: 8 September 1933 Terijoki, Finland
- Died: 24 September 2016 (aged 83) Jyväskylä, Finland
- Occupation: Coach

Sport
- Sport: Ski jumping

Matti Pulli (8 September 1933 – 24 September 2016) was a Finnish Olympic ski jumping coach. He coached the 1984 and 1988 gold medalist Matti Nykänen. In the biographical film Matti: Hell Is for Heroes, the character of Maisteri was based loosely on Pulli.
