= Pelicanman =

2004 Finnish fantasy film

Pelikaanimies
- Film poster for Pelikaanimies
- Directed by: Liisa Helminen
- Written by: William Alridge, Liisa Helminen
- Produced by: Hanna Hemilä
- Starring: Kari Ketonen, Roni Haarakangas, Inka Nuorgam
- Cinematography: Timo Salminen
- Distributed by: Buena Vista International
- Release date: 2004
- Running time: 1h 30min
- Country: Finland
- Language: Finnish

Pelicanman (Finnish: Pelikaanimies) is a 2004 Finnish fantasy film.

== Plot ==
A pelican magically changes his appearance into that of a young man. He walks and acts somewhat oddly compared to real humans, and at first he does not know much about humans, but he learns fast. He rents an apartment and gets a job. The 10-year-old boy Emil finds out that he is a pelican, and they become friends.

The pelican man is sent to a zoo, but Emil helps him escape. Then the pelican man changes back to pelican appearance.

== Cast ==
- Kari Ketonen – Pelicanman
- Roni Haarakangas – Emil
- Inka Nuorgam – Elsa
- Jonna Järnefelt – janitor
- Liisa Mustonen – Emil's mother
- Tommi Raitolehto – Emil's father
- Anu Viheriäranta – Helena ballerina
- Ismo Kallio – doorman
- Heikki Kinnunen – postman
- Jussi Lampi – repairman
- Kristiina Elstelä – lottery clerk
- Seppo Pääkkönen – zookeeper
- Antti Pääkkönen – zookeeper
- Juha Varjus – zookeeper
- Anu Komsi – diva
- Björn Andrésen – pianist
- Jorma Uotinen – von Rothbart
- Emma Grönqvist – ballet teacher
- Katariina Lohiniva – café owner
- Emma Lillqvist – little girl
- Kiureli Sammallahti – accordionist
- Carl-Johan Häggman – drummer
- Leif Segerstam - conductor
