= Pictak Cie =

French animation production company

Pictak Cie is a French animation production company. The company was founded by Xavier Picard and the Japanese producer Takashi Masunaga in 2000. Pictak collaborates with other French and international premier 3D and 2D studios. Some of Pictak's co-productions include Moomins on the Riviera, Marcelino, Odd Family and Valerian.
