= Ansa ja Oiva =

- Country of origin: Finland

Original release
- Network: Yle TV1
- Release: 1998 – 2001

Ansa ja Oiva is a Finnish television series. It first aired on Finnish TV in 1998 and last aired in 2001. Appearances in the series were made by Juha Veijonen, Heikki Määttänen, Jarmo Koski, Peter Franzén, Erja Manto, Mikko Kivinen, Vesa Vierikko, Heikki Nousiainen, Petteri Summanen, Susanna Haavisto, Tapio Liinoja, Janne Kallioniemi, Kari Väänänen, Susanna Roine, Asko Sarkola, Jussi Lampi, Martti Suosalo, Kai Lehtinen and Antti Pääkkönen.

== See also ==
- List of Finnish television series
