= Annina Enckell =

Annina Enckell (born 19 September 1957) is a Finnish award-winning playwright and screenwriter. Annina Enckell has written plays, radio plays, and TV- and feature film screenplays for children and adults in Swedish and Finnish. She is a screenwriter on the Moomins on the Riviera feature film. She received an award for “De bäst anpassade” at Svenska Teatern, the Swedish National Theatre in Helsinki, and for the feature film Iris (directed by Ulrika Bengts), selected the best film at Oulu International Children's and Youth Film Festival (2011). Enkcell is a graduate of The Theatre Academy in Helsinki.
