= Milla Viljamaa =

Finnish musician and composer (born 1980)

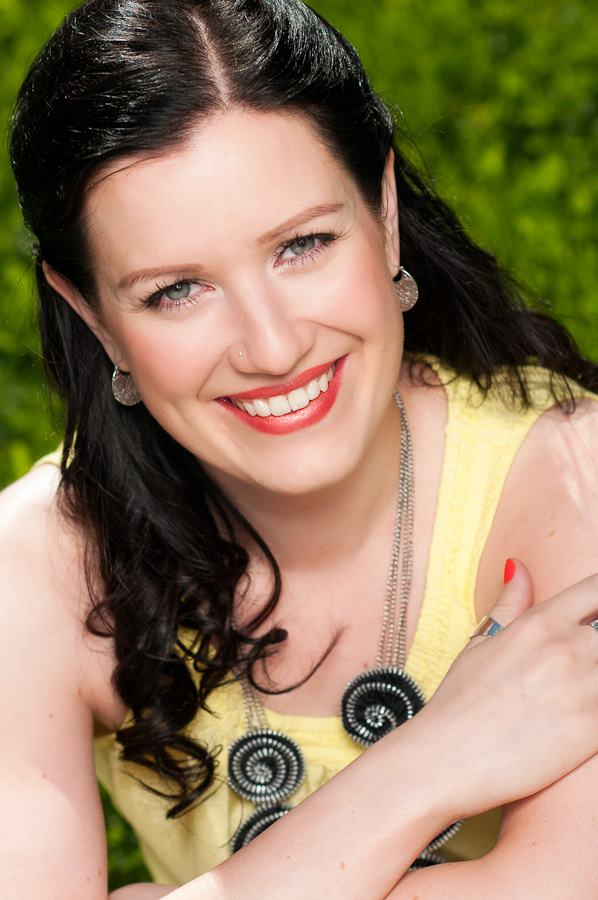

Background information
- Born: 8 February 1980 (age 45)
- Genres: Tango nuevo, folk, chamber music, circus music, world music
- Occupation(s): Musician, composer, arranger, producer
- Instrument(s): Grand piano, harmonium
- Labels: Texicalli Records, Aito Records, Plastinka Records, Warner Music Finlandia Records
- Website: millaviljamaa.com

Milla Viljamaa (born 1980) is a Finnish musician, composer and producer known for her creative works in various fields ranging from folk music, tango, rock, pop and chamber music to theatre, opera, ballet and film productions as well as different kinds of concerts. Her work as a composer received significant recognition when she was given the 2012 Teosto Prize from her solo album “Minne”. The prize, awarded by the Finnish Composers' Copyright Society Teosto, is one of the biggest art prizes in Nordic countries and aims to highlight new works that are fresh, original and innovative. She have been playing in the following ensembles: Lauri Tähkä Revohka, Duo Milla Viljamaa & Johanna Juhola, Las Chicas del Tango, Milla Viljamaa & Co, Johanna Juhola Reaktori and Hereä. She has also worked with larger groups like Norwegian Chamber Orchestra, Australian Chamber Orchestra, Saint Paul Chamber Orchestra, Irish Chamber Orchestra, Britten Sinfonia and Tapiola Sinfonietta. In 2002 Duo Milla Viljamaa & Johanna Juhola won the 1st prize of the International Ástor Piazzolla Competition (Citta di Castelfidardo Award, Astor Piazzolla Music Section) and in 2008 received the Emma nomination for best ethnic music album. Viljamaa have also been teaching at the Sibelius-Academy Folk Music Department in Helsinki where she graduated with a master's degree majoring in piano and harmonium in 2007. She has also published new kind of learning material in form of a book of sheet music and CD called "Folk Music for Pianists" in 2008 and "Folk Music for Pianists - beginners" in 2012. Milla is known as an charismatic performer and a musician. One of her specialities is her skills with a traditional instrument harmonium, that she have been presenting abroad globally.

== Releases ==
- Riikka Timonen & Senni Eskelinen: Perillä –composer, arranger CD 2018
- Hereä: Veden värit –composer, arranger and musician (Groovy Records HEREA002) CD 2016
- Saaga Ensemble: Kuullella –composer, arranger and musician (SAAGACD002) CD 2015
- Lauri Tähkä: Jouluni laulut –producera, arranger and musician (Universal Music) CD 2014
- Duo Milla Viljamaa & Johanna Juhola: Tango Diary –composer, arranger and musician (MVJJCD001) CD 2013
- Saaga Ensemble: Polku –muusikko ja sovittaja (SAAGACD001) CD 2013
- Kansanmusiikkia pianisteille – alkeet, Sheet music for studies 2012
- Las Chicas del Tango: Tango de Norte a Sur –composer, arranger and musician (ARC Music EUCD2365) CD 2012
- Milla Viljamaa: Minne, A solo record with original music 2011
- Johanna Juhola Reaktori: Tango Roto Live CD 2010
- Milla Viljamaa: Paras aika päivästä (Best time of day) A solo record with original music 2008
- Kansanmusiikkia pianisteille (Folk Music for Pianists) Sheet music for studies, CD (ISMN 979-0-55001-159-5) 2008
- Hereä: Hereä (Plastinka Records PLACD048) 2007
- Duo Milla Viljamaa & Johanna Juhola: Mi Retorno CD (Texicalli Records TEXCD076) 2007
- Las Chicas del Tango: La Voz Femenina CD (Texicalli Records TEXCD0079) 2007
- Duo Milla Viljamaa & Johanna Juhola: Piazzolla Passage CD (Warner Music Finlandia Records) 2004

== Selected Productions ==
- Pohjan neidon tarina – A visual music tale, Musiikkiteateri Kapsäkki 2011
- Valveunia – A staged concert composed by Duo Milla Viljamaa & Johanna Juhola, director Anni Ojanen 2010
- Lumikki (Snow White) – The beloved story told in the language of dance, puppet theatre and music, director Elina Lajunen music by Milla Viljamaa 2010
- Tango Roto – A modern Finnish tango show, director Minna Vainikainen 2009
- Maria de Buenos Aires – A tango operita made by Astor Piazzolla and Horacio Ferrer, director Ville Saukkonen 2008
- Kadonnut Kuu (Lost Moon) – A contemporary dance performance, choreographed by Jorma Uotinen, dancers Sirpa Suutari-Jääskö and Jukka Haapalainen 2008
- Ansa (A Trap) – A visual concert with dance, circus and reacting video 2008
- Kanteleen kyydissä (A Kantele Trip) – An interactive music story. Script and director Eppu Nuotio, music by Vilma Timonen 2008
- Tummien perhosten koti (The Home of The dark Butterflies) – A movie by Dome Karukoski, music by Panu Aaltio 2008
- Reverie – A new circus production, Med andra ord 2007
- Kadonnut Kuu (Lost Moon) – An audiovisual concert with video art 2005
- Bandu Bandu – A doctorate degree concert of Arnold Chiwalala 2002
- Lumottu Saari (Enchanted Island) – A play with plenty of musicians, dancers and circus artists 2000
