= Seppo Pääkkönen =

Finnish actor (born 1957)

- Born: Seppo Sakari Pääkkönen; 15 June 1957 (age 69); Kuhmo, Finland

Seppo Sakari Pääkkönen (born 15 June 1957 in Kuhmo) is a Finnish actor.

He is married to Virve Havelin. Their son Jasper Pääkkönen is also an actor.

Pääkkönen played Matti's father in the 2006 film Matti: Hell Is for Heroes, where his real-life son plays his on-screen son.

His younger brother Antti Pääkkönen is also an actor.

== Partial filmography ==
- Tupla-Uuno (1988)
- Uuno Turhapuro – Suomen tasavallan herra presidentti (1990)
- Santa Claus and the Magic Drum (Joulupukki ja noitarumpu, 1996)
- Cyclomania (2001)
- Pelicanman (Pelikaanimies, 2004)
- Matti: Hell Is for Heroes (Matti, 2006)
- V2: Dead Angel (V2 – Jäätynyt enkeli, 2007)
- Run Sister Run! (Sisko tahtoisin jäädä, 2010)
- Wildeye (Kätilö) (2015)
