= Ateneum =

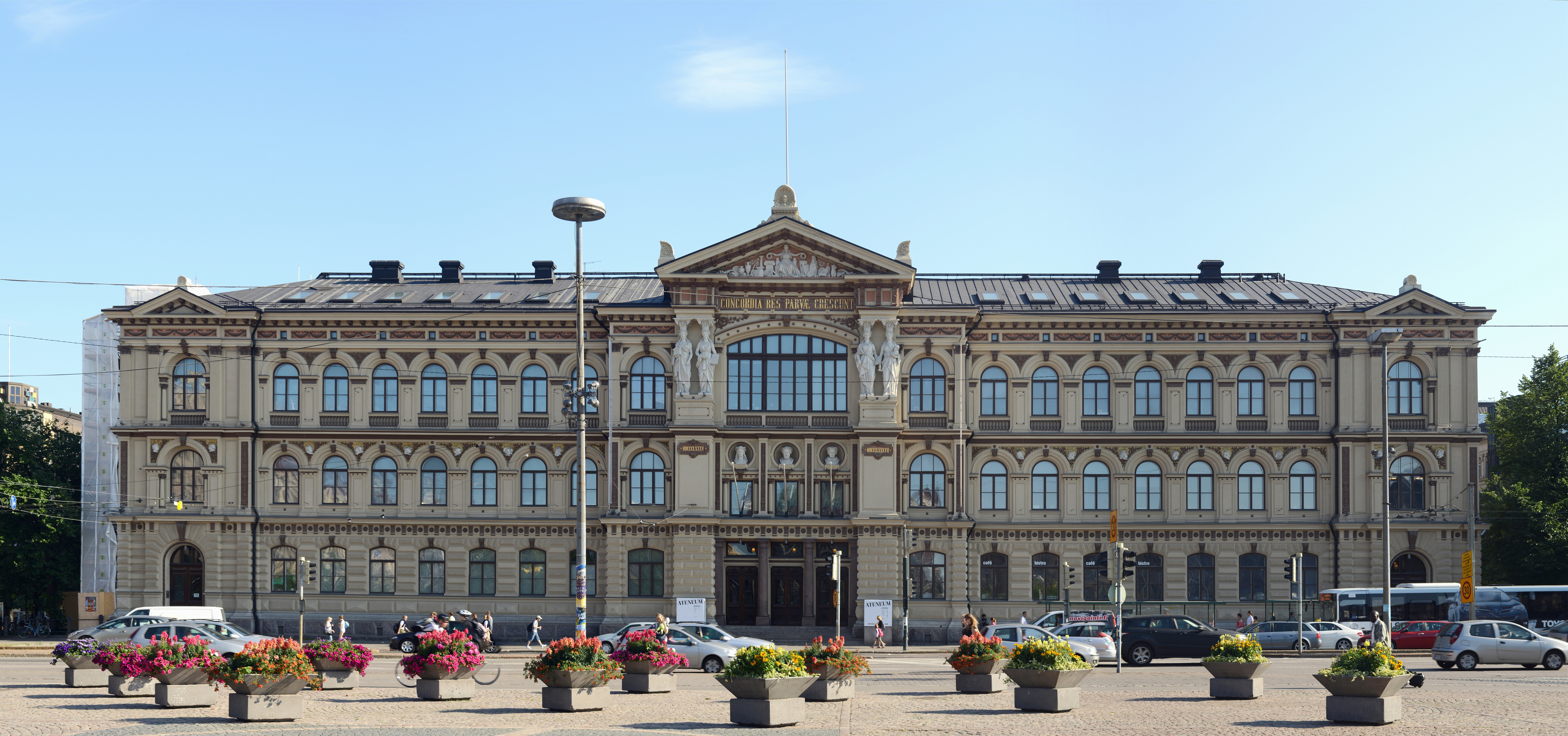
- Ateneum art museum
- Interactive fullscreen map
- Established: 1887
- Location: Helsinki, Finland
- Coordinates: 60°10′12″N 024°56′39″E
- Type: Art museum
- Key holdings: The Wounded Angel, Lemminkäinen's Mother, Aino triptych, Raatajat rahanalaiset (Kaski), Street in Auvers-sur-Oise
- Collection size: 4,300+ paintings, 750+ sculptures
- Visitors: 400 000 (2012)
- Director: Anna-Maria von Bonsdorff (since 2024)
- Website: ateneum.fi

Ateneum is an art museum in Helsinki, Finland and one of the three museums forming the Finnish National Gallery. It is located in the centre of Helsinki on the south side of Rautatientori square close to Helsinki Central railway station. It has the biggest collections of classical art in Finland. Before 1991 the Ateneum building also housed the Finnish Academy of Fine Arts and University of Art and Design Helsinki.

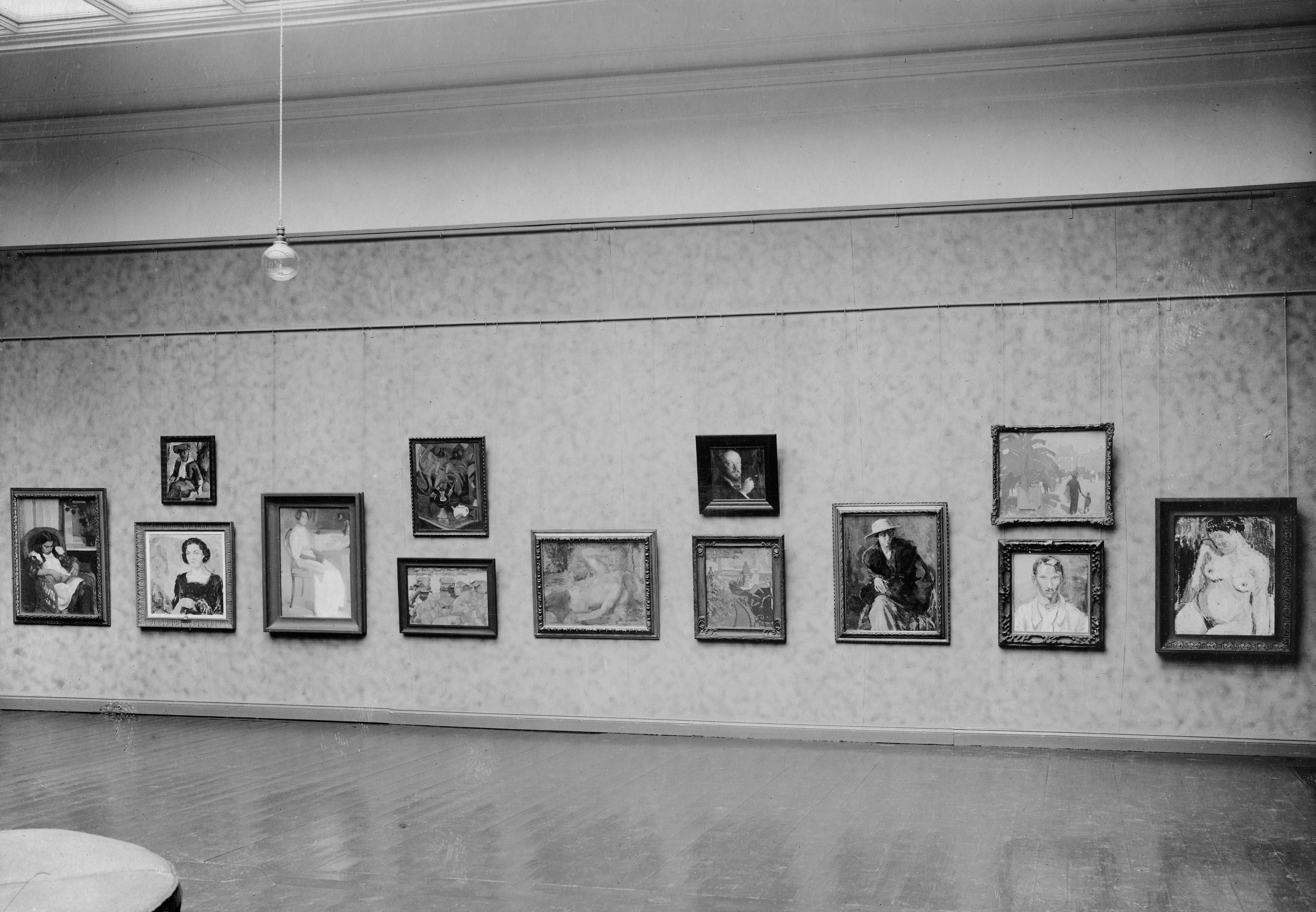
Exhibition of the Finnish Art Society at Ateneum in 1915

== Collections ==
The collections of Ateneum include Finnish art extensively from 18th-century rococo portraiture to the experimental art movements of the 20th century. The collections also include some 650 international works of art. One of them is Vincent van Gogh's Street in Auvers-sur-Oise (1890), which when deposited to Ateneum in 1903 made it the first museum collection in the world to include a Vincent van Gogh painting. Other notable works include Albert Edelfelt’s The Luxembourg Garden (1887), Akseli Gallen-Kallela’s Aino Triptych (1891), Eero Järnefelt’s Under the Yoke (Burning the Brushwood) (1893) and Hugo Simberg’s The Wounded Angel (1903).

== Notable works ==
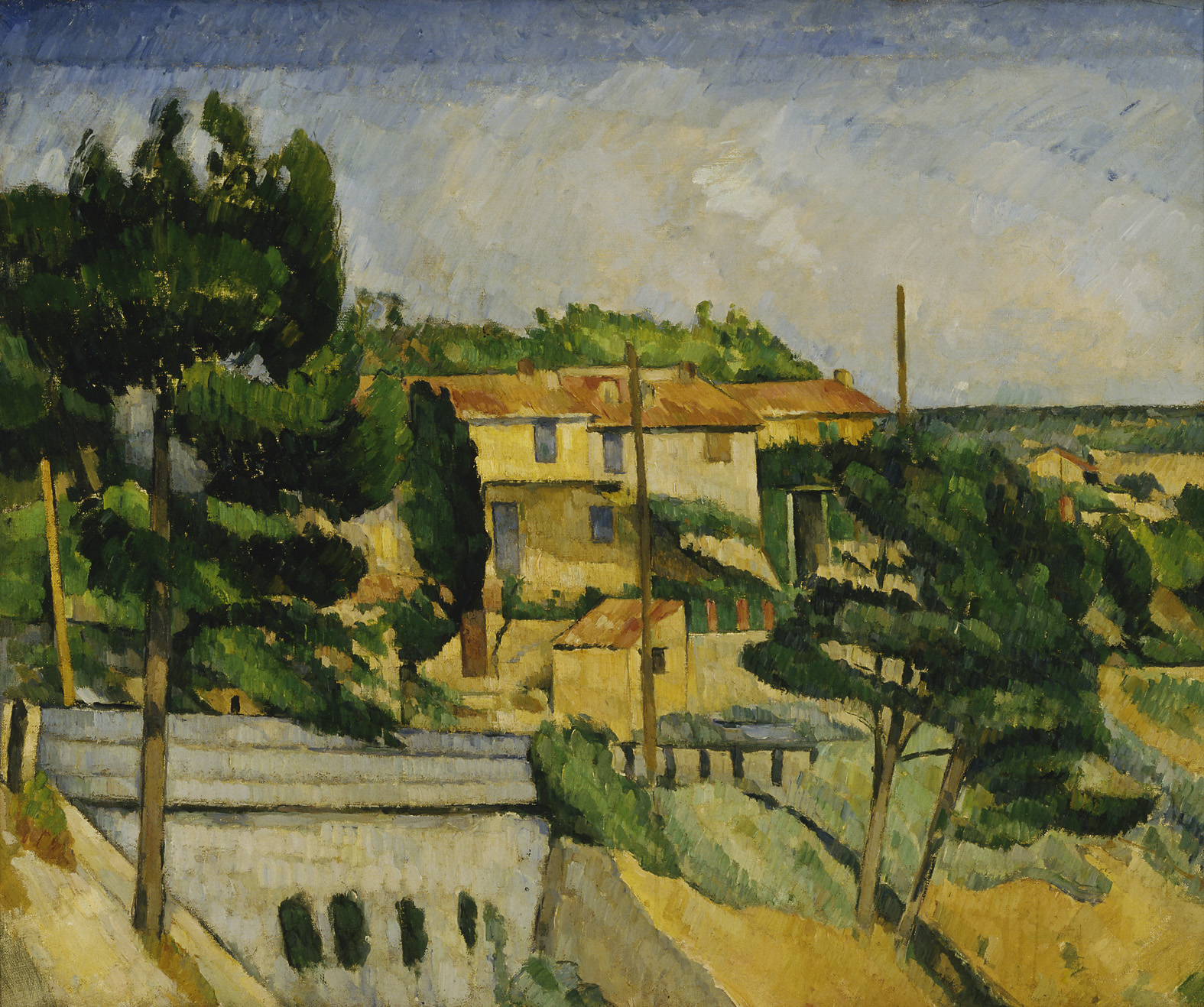
The Road Bridge at L'Estaque, Paul Cézanne, 1879–1882

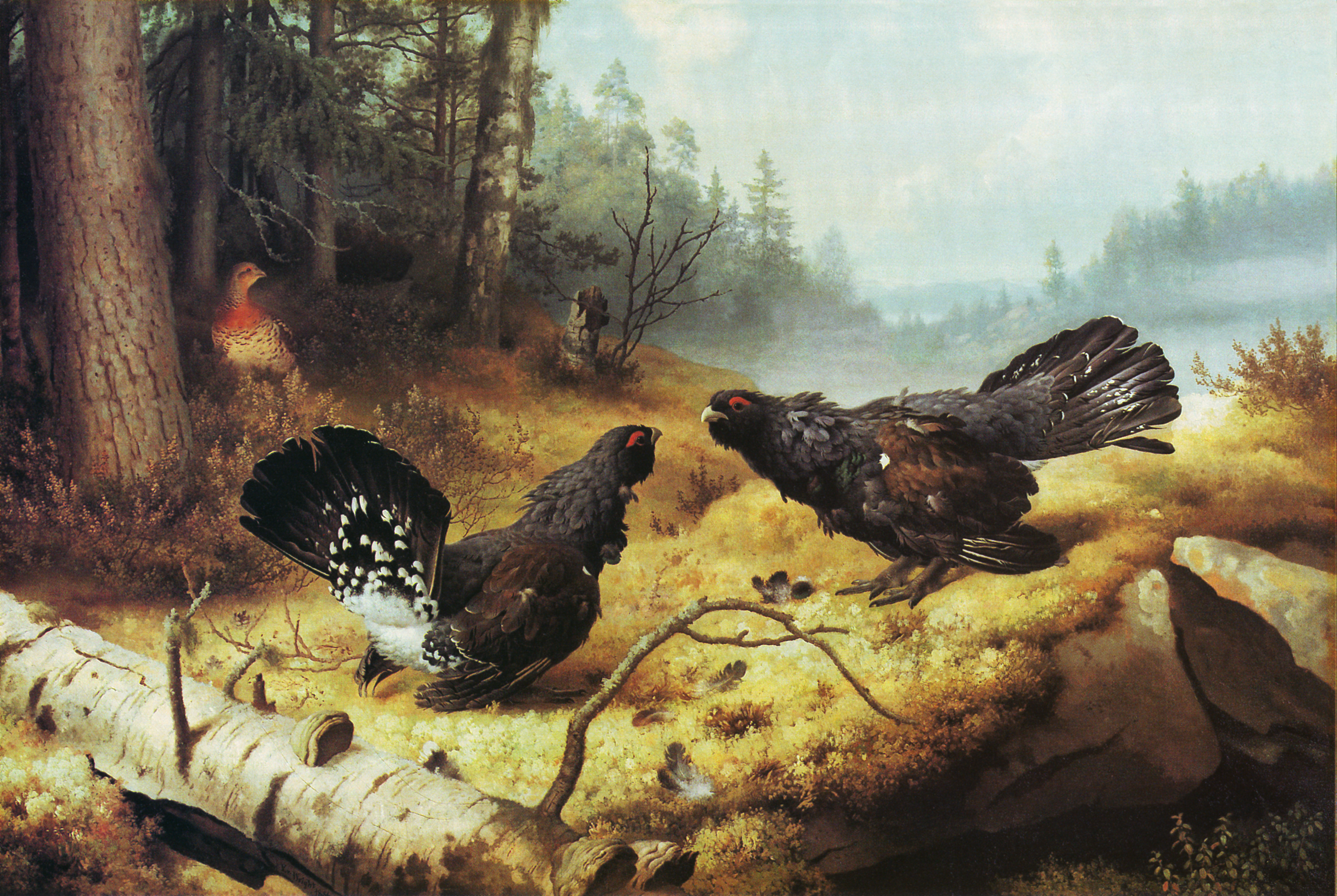
The Fighting Capercaillies, Ferdinand von Wright, 1886

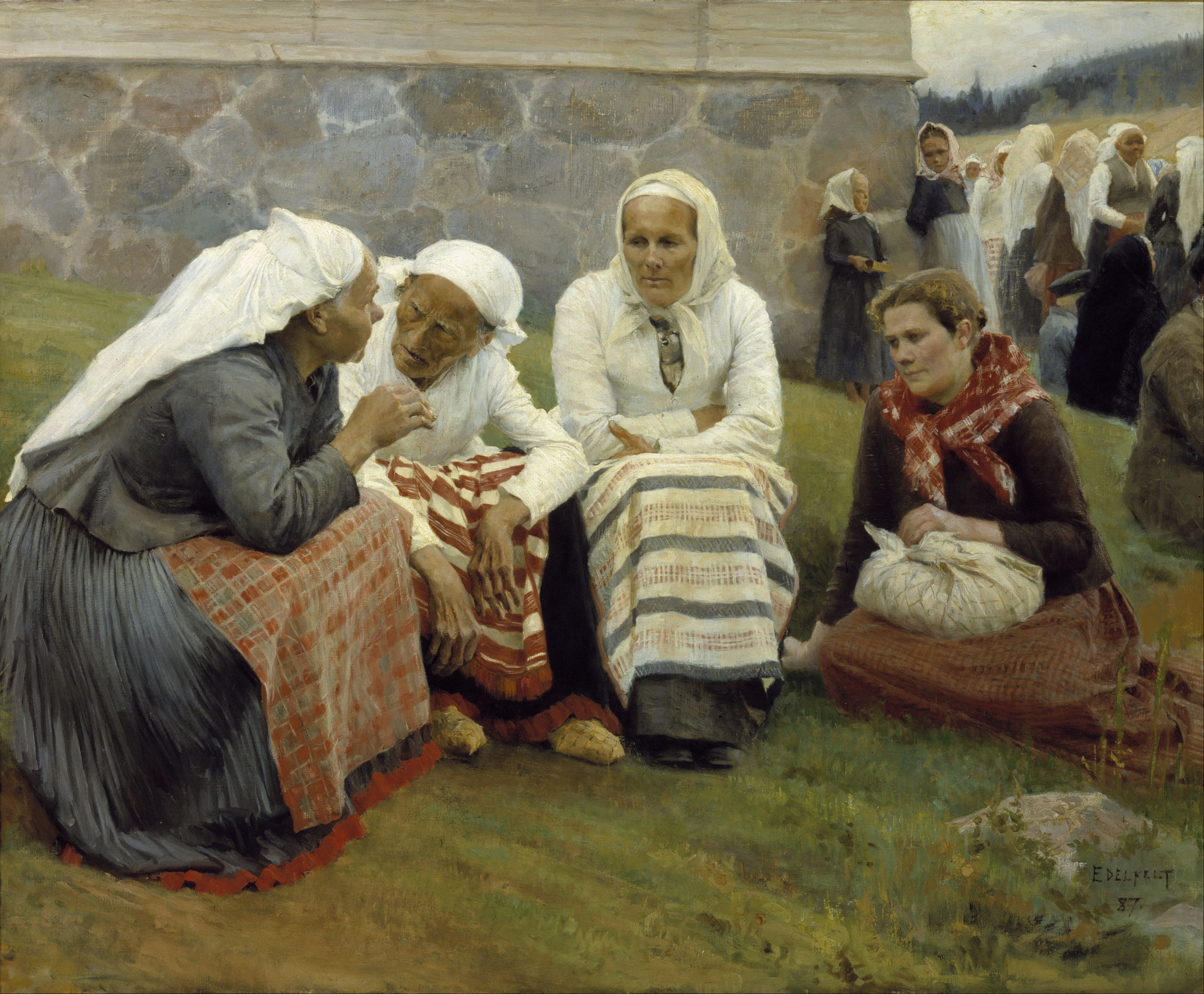
Women Outside the Church at Ruokolahti, Albert Edelfelt, 1887

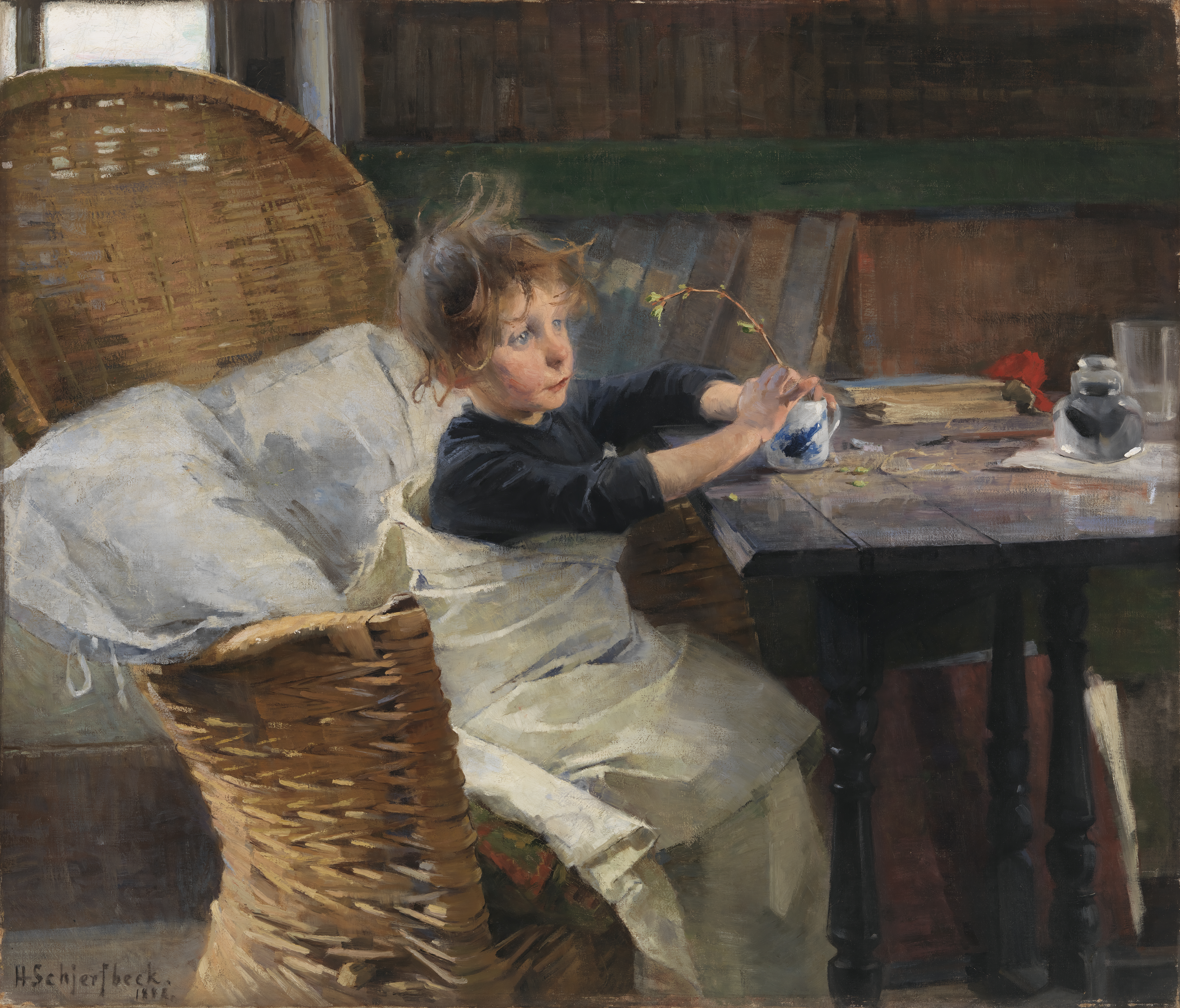
The Convalescent, Helene Schjerfbeck, 1888

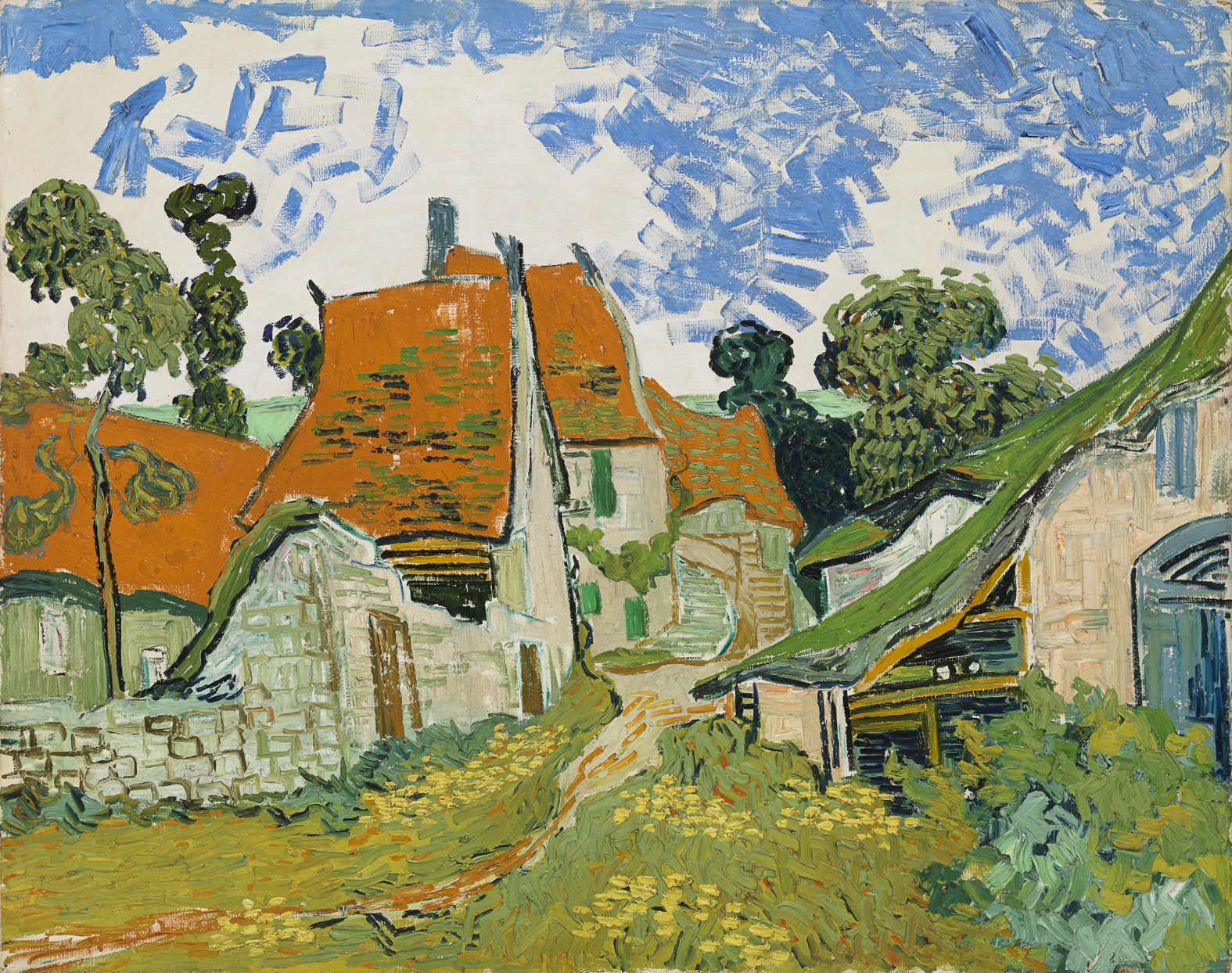
Street in Auvers-sur-Oise, Vincent van Gogh, 1890

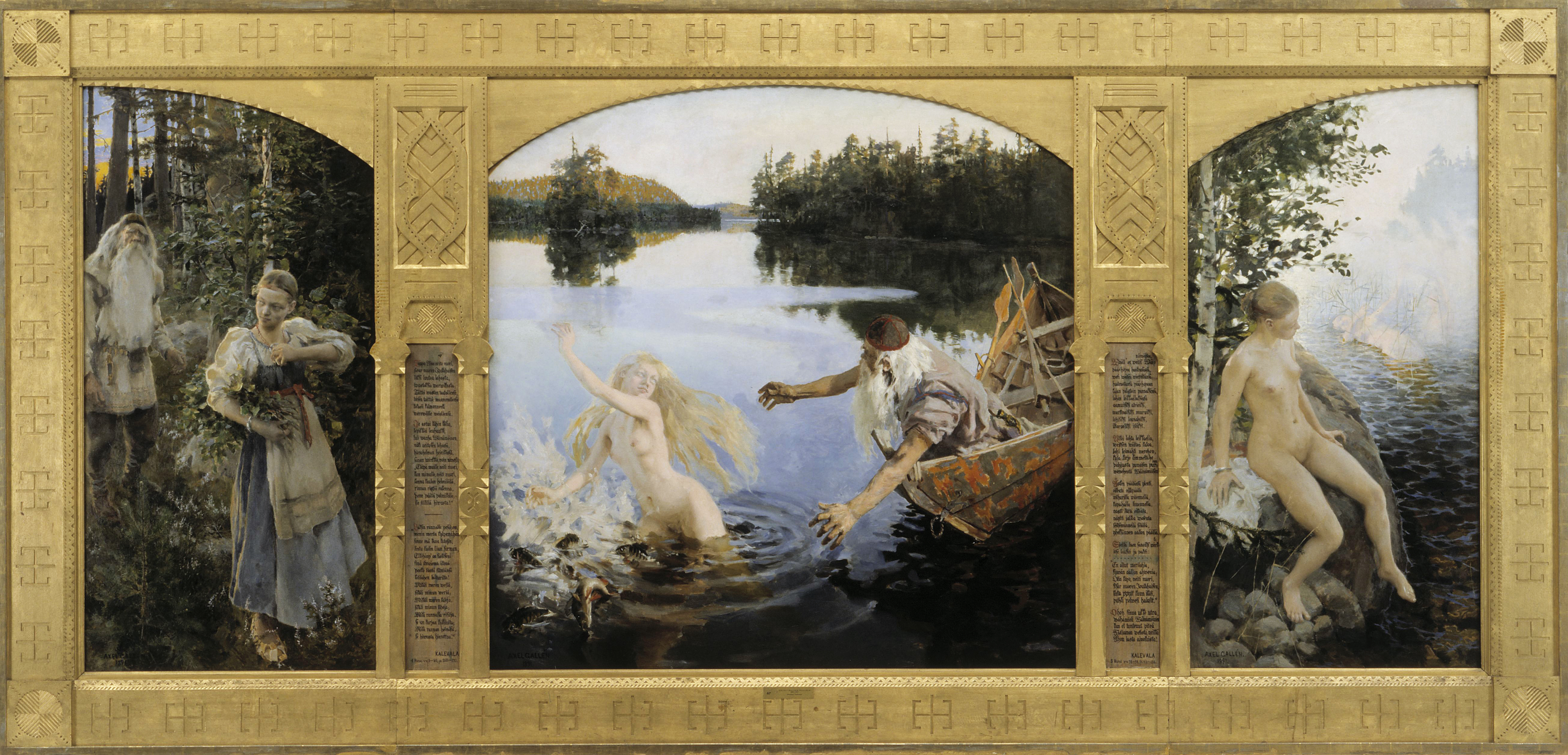
Aino Myth, Triptych, Akseli Gallen-Kallela, 1891

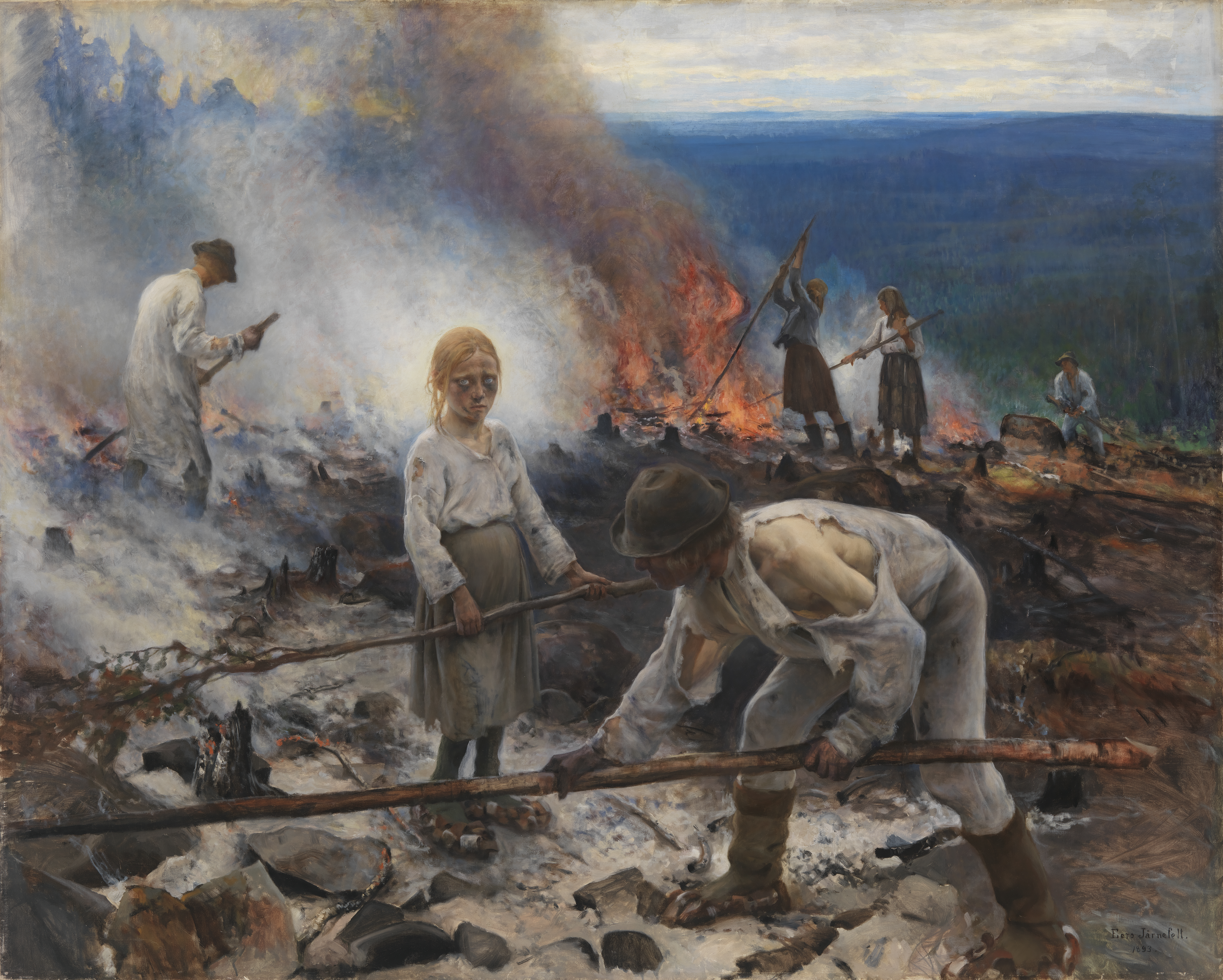
Under the Yoke (Burning the Brushwood), Eero Järnefelt, 1893

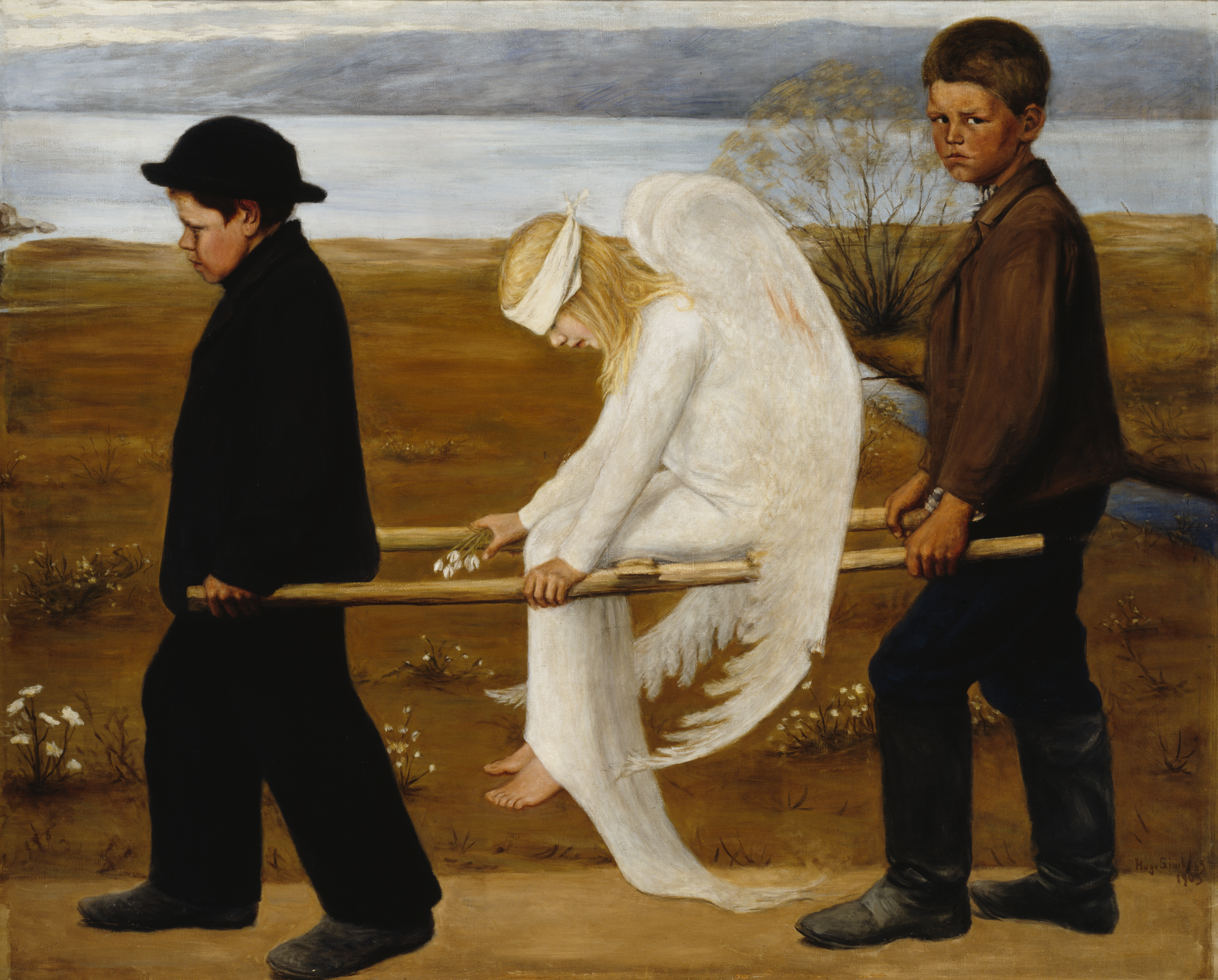
The Wounded Angel, Hugo Simberg, 1903

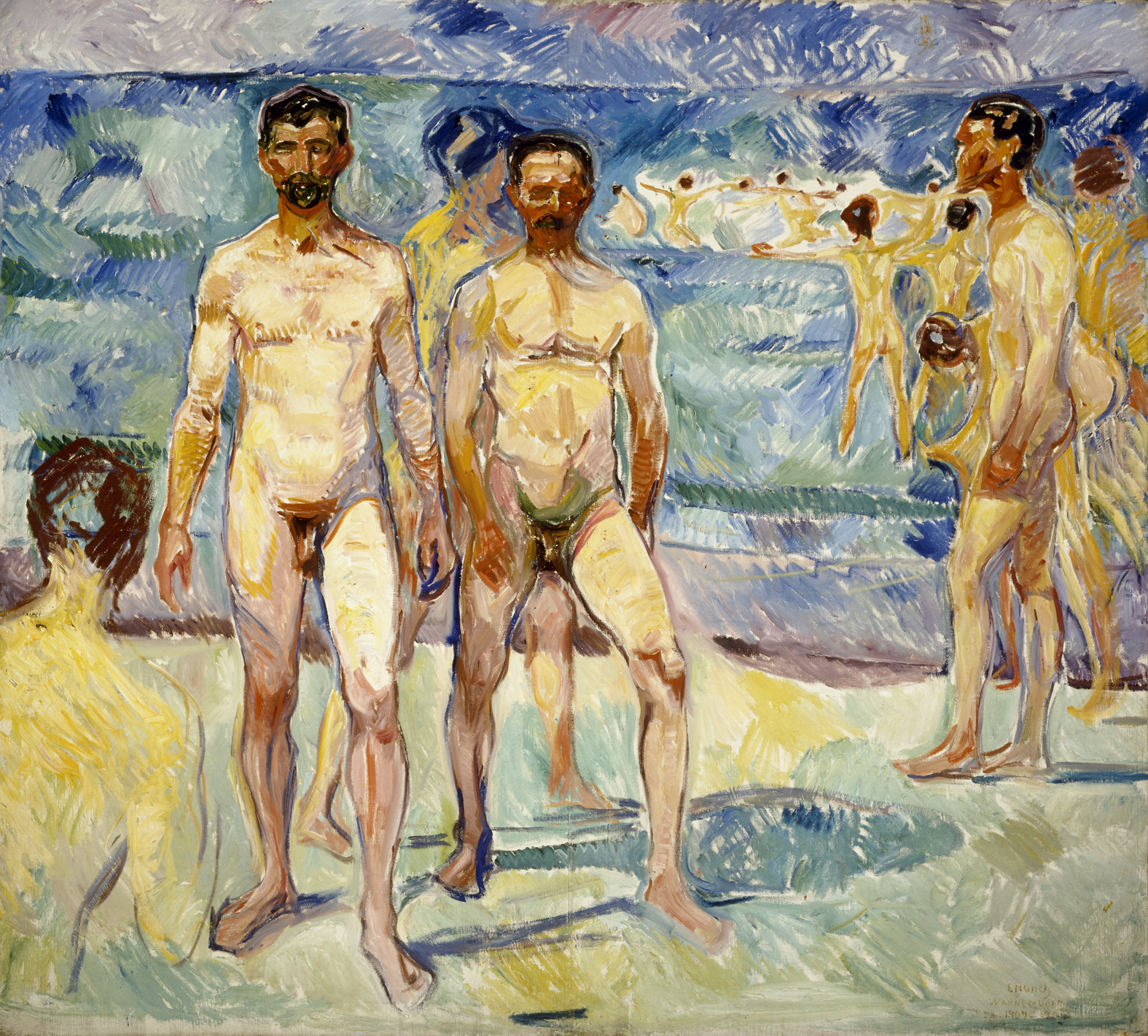
Bathing Men, Edvard Munch, 1907–1908

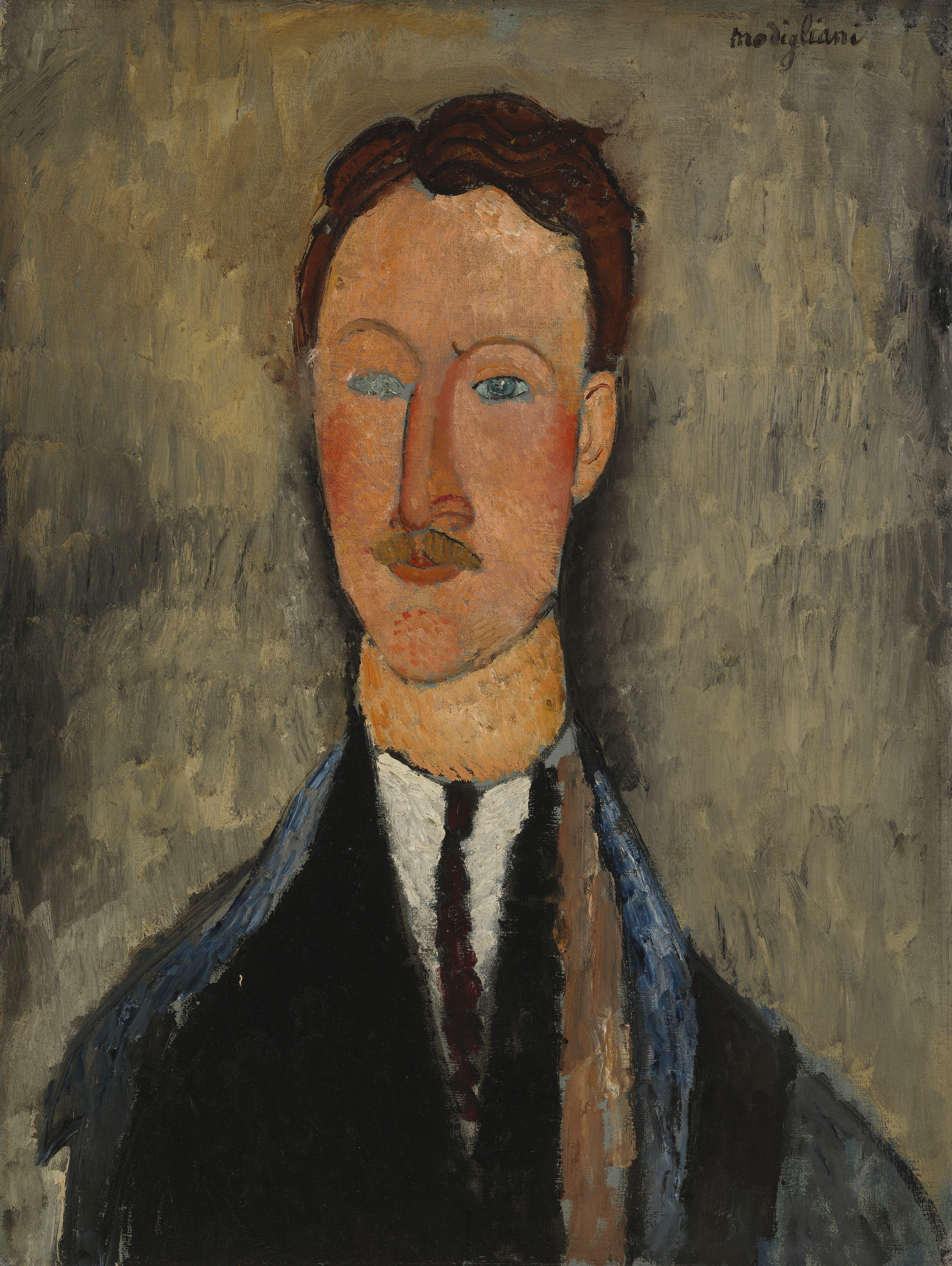
Portrait of the Artist Léopold Survage, Amedeo Modigliani, 1918

== Architecture ==
The Ateneum building was designed by Theodor Höijer and completed in 1887.

The facade of Ateneum is decorated with statues and reliefs which contain a lot of symbols. Above the main entrance, in the second floor, are busts of three famous classical artists: architect Bramante, painter Raphael and sculptor Phidias. Above the busts, in the third floor, four caryatids support the pediment. These symbolize the four classical art forms: sculpture, painting, geometry, and architecture. The facade culminates in a collage of sculptures in which the Goddess of Art, Pallas Athene, blesses the products of the different art forms. Below the pediment's collage is the Latin phrase Concordia res parvae crescunt (With concord small things increase), which is usually understood in Helsinki to refer to the long-lasting battle of the Finnish art circles in order to establish the museum. All the statues were by Carl Eneas Sjöstrand.

In between the second floor windows are 16 medallion-style reliefs by Ville Vallgren representing some of Finland's most well known creative people of his day, including painter Aleksander Lauréus, Werner Holmberg and the architect Carl Ludvig Engel. Other ornamental elements were sculpted by Magnus von Wright.

The Ateneum building is owned by Senate Properties (Finnish: Senaatti-kiinteistöt), the government real estate provider.

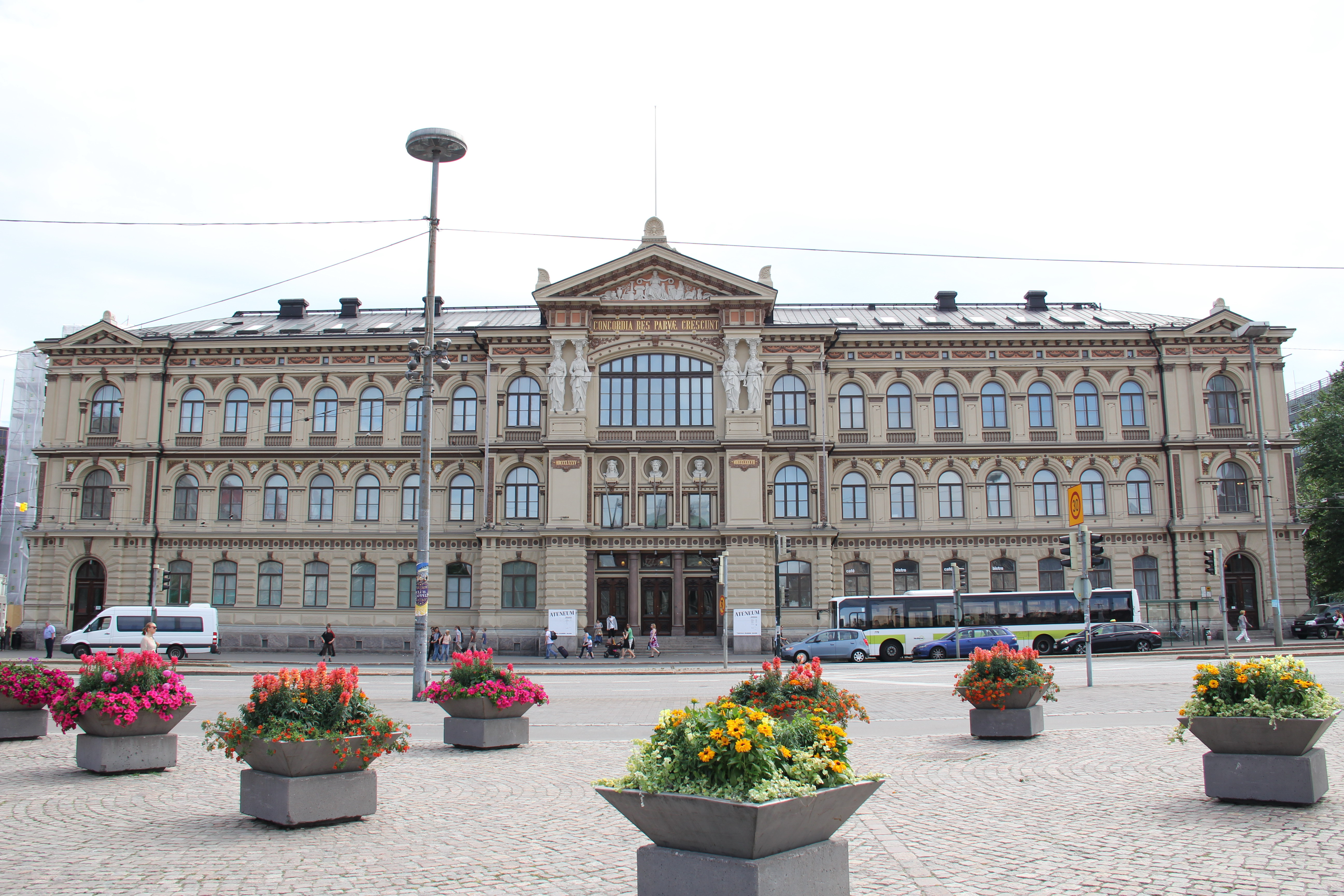
The center sculptures of the facade were sculpted by Carl Eneas Sjöstrand in the 1880s.

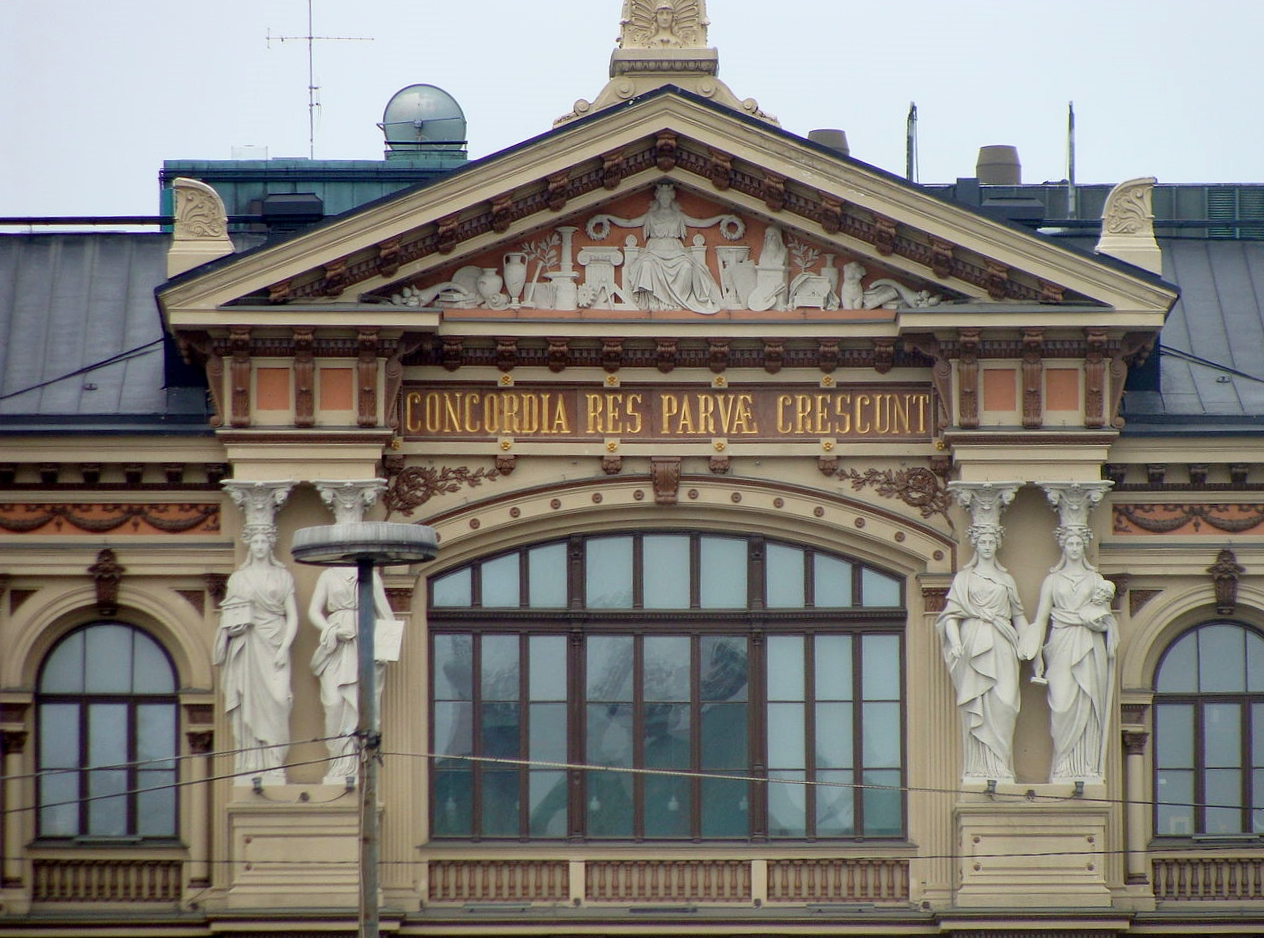
"Goddess of Art" and Caryatids

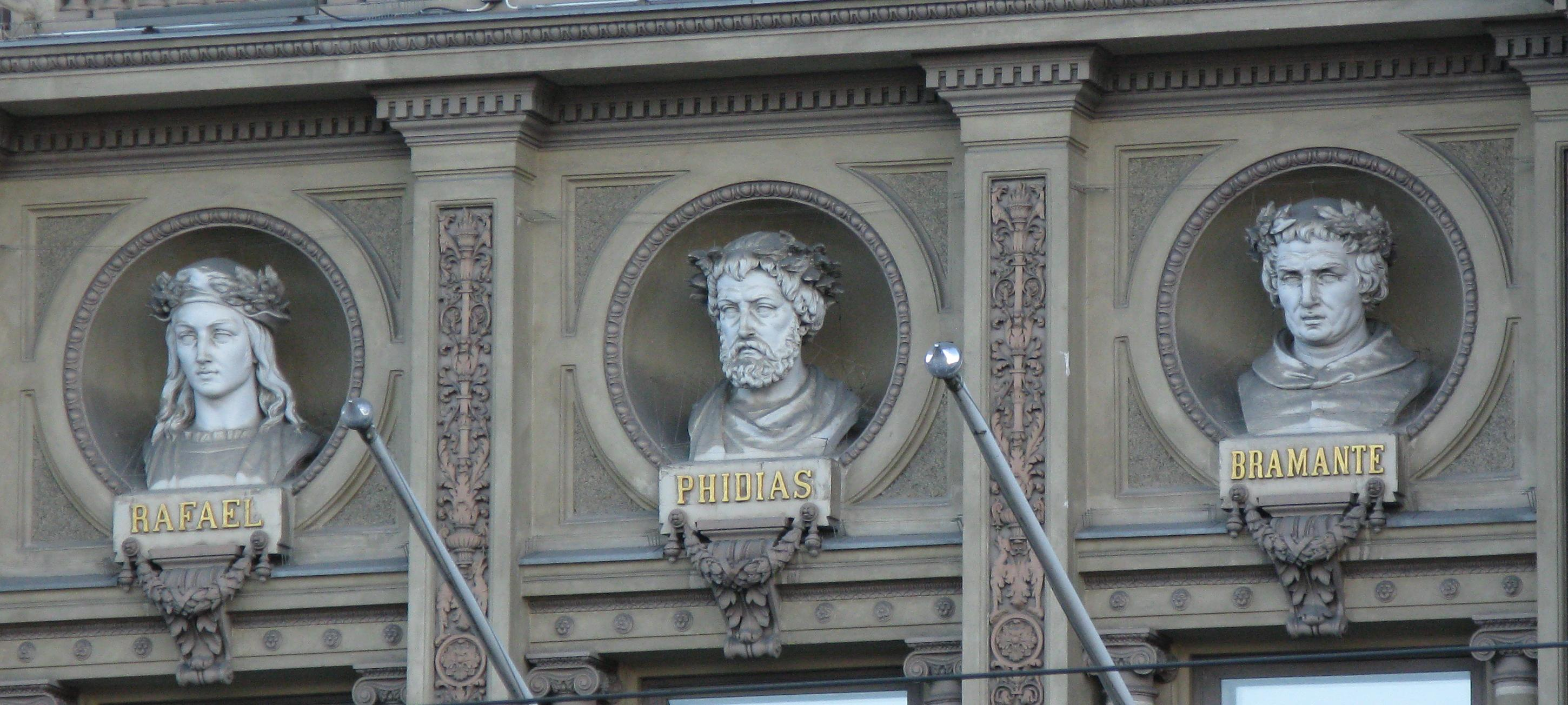
Busts of the three greats: Raphael, Phidias and Bramante

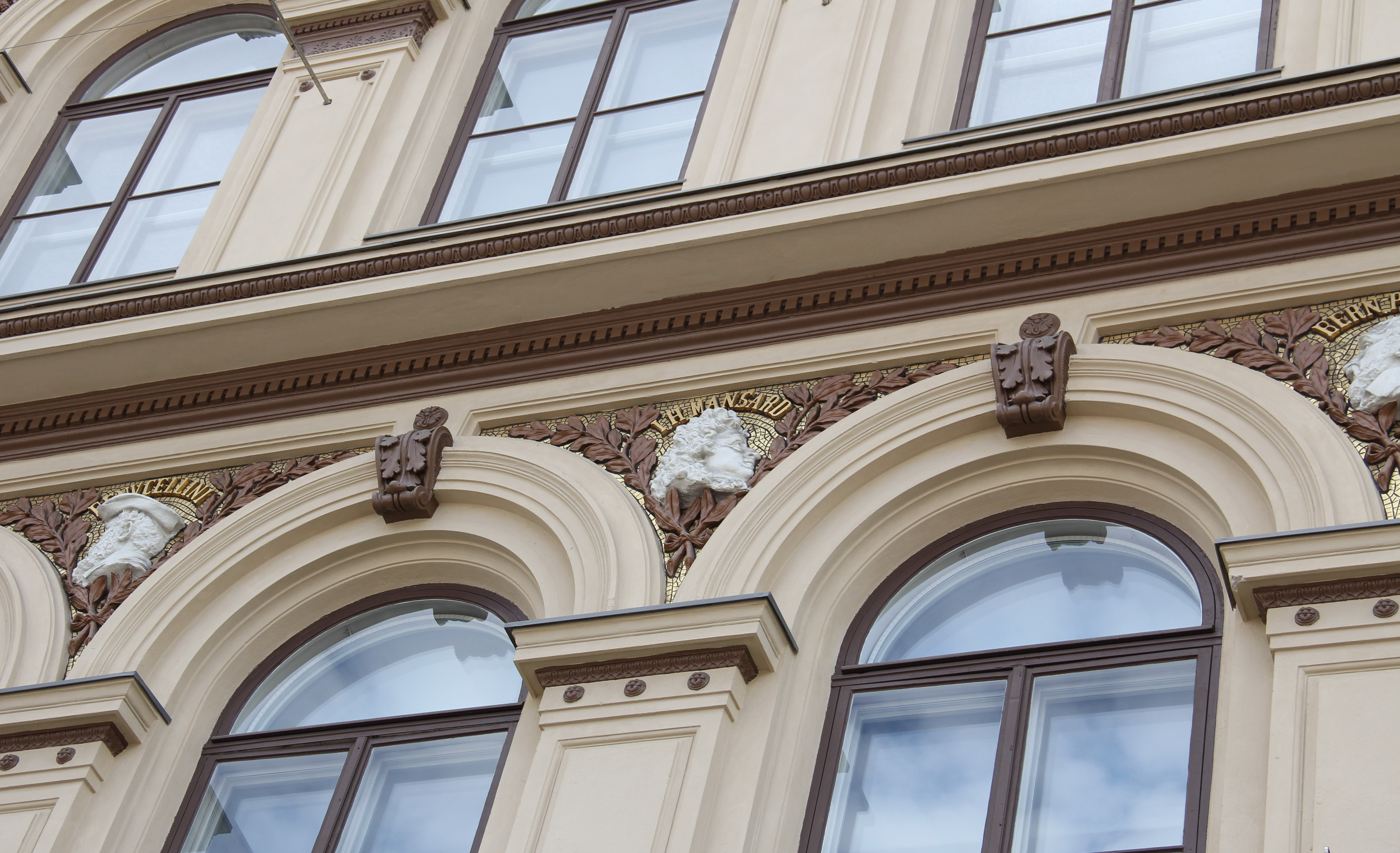
16 artist medallions on the facade by Ville Vallgren, 1887

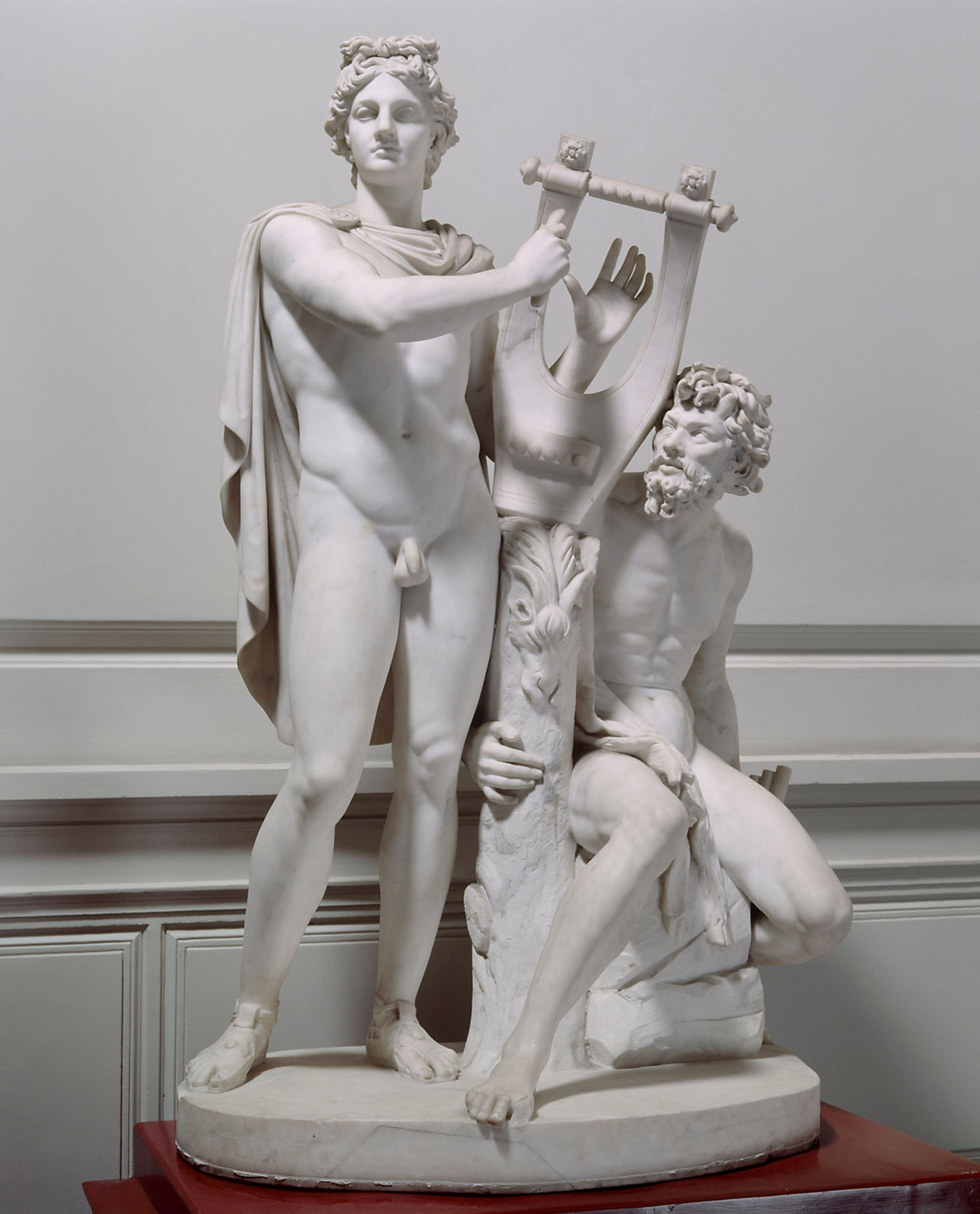
Apollo and Marsyas by Walter Runeberg in 1874, located in the lobby

== See also ==
- Finnish National Gallery
- Kiasma
- Sinebrychoff Art Museum
- Finnish art
- List of national galleries
