= Influences on Tove Jansson's writing =

Influences on Tove Jansson's writing thought to be significant by critics include world events during her lifetime, such as the Second World War, personal events like the death of her mother, her relationships with lovers and life partners, and books including those she read as a child and the Bible. Many of her Moomin characters embody aspects of her character.

== Events ==
Mount Vesuvius erupting. Jansson visited the volcano before writing Comet in Moominland.

Tove Jansson published her first Moomin book, The Moomins and the Great Flood, in 1945, after years of war, with Finland facing the threat of invasion by the Soviet Union.

Some critics have considered the comet in Jansson's Comet in Moominland (Kometjakten), written soon afterwards, an allegory of nuclear weapons. The first version of the book was written before those weapons were first used in 1945, so its tenor reflects a more general fear of war and the possible occupation of Finland by the Soviet Union. Jansson's revisions of the text in 1956 and 1968 clearly indicate that her concern had shifted to the threat of worldwide nuclear war. More innocently, the text could recall the meteorite that struck Finland in 1899. The volcano in the story is based on Jansson's visit to Mount Vesuvius in Italy, while her account of how the Moominfamily survives the eruption in a cave is made realistic with her personal experience of hiding in bomb shelters during the Second World War.

== Relationships ==
Several of the Moomin characters are thought by scholars to reflect Jansson's close relationships. These include the pair seen in the 1948 Finn Family Moomintroll and other Moomin books, called "Thingumy and Bob" in English (from 'thingummybob', something whose name one has forgotten). The pair were originally Tofslan and Vifslan, the pet names of Tove (Jansson) and her theatre director lover Vivica Bandler, a subtlety lost in translation. The couple always appear together, and have a private language that only they understand. In Swedish, their language adds their pet names' suffix "-sla" to words, as in Begripslar du allsla? for Begriper du alls? ("Can you understand anything?"). That very personal touch is replaced in translation by the English habit of spoonerism, swapping the first letters of a pair of words in each sentence. Elizabeth Lovatt, writing for Penguin Books, notes that Jansson was always quiet about her sexuality, but "found ways to celebrate her loves in the world of Moominvalley." Lovatt comments that given this real-world context, the couple's "shiny red gem that must be hidden from others" becomes much easier to understand.

Another character, Snufkin (originally Snusmumrik or just Mumrik), appears in Comet in Moominland and five later books; he is Moomintroll's best friend. Jansson based him on her friend and one-time fiancé, the journalist and member of parliament Atos Wirtanen. The Muskrat, too, is a portrait of Wirtanen, who like the character was somewhat clumsy and impractical.

The 1957 Moominland Midwinter (Trollvinter) introduces the character Too-Ticky, a representation of Jansson's life-long partner, Tuulikki Pietilä, who was known as Tutti.

Moominpappa and Moominmamma are often seen as portraits of Jansson's parents Viktor Jansson and Signe Hammarsten-Jansson. The titular character of Moominpappa at Sea is straightforwardly based on Jansson's father.

The last Moomin book, the 1971 Moominvalley in November (Sent i november), was written when Jansson's mother, Signe Hammarsten-Jansson, was close to death, and it has a sombre tone, its themes described by the author Evan James as "loss and the finiteness of life". One of her books for adults, The Summer Book (Sommarboken), published in 1972, depicts a family, mainly a grandmother (farmor, paternal grandmother) and a granddaughter, Sophia, mourning the loss of a mother. The grandmother is modelled on Jansson's own mother, Signe Hammarsten-Jansson, while the child is modelled on Sophia Jansson, Tove's niece.

== Self-portraits ==
Jansson's self-portrayal with the character Tofslan was just one of several instances where her characters represent herself; Tuula Karjalainen suggests that elements of her personality appear in all the residents of Moominvalley. Both Moomintroll and Little My have been seen as psychological self-portraits. Karjalainen's biography of Jansson includes a drawing that she made in a letter to Vivica Bandler, showing Tove as a happy Moomintroll waving a flower and a letter.

Elements of Tove Jansson's personality in the Moomins
Character	Personality element	Notes
Snufkin	love of nature longing for peace and quiet longing for a place of his own	
The Hemulens	conscientiousness emphasis on hard work	Jansson recorded all aspects of her commercial work precisely
The Groke	desperate attempts at intimacy	
Moomintroll	described by Jansson as her alter ego	Central figure; Jansson drew him (as herself) in her letters, and added him to her signature on her Garm magazine covers
Little My	sharp tongue, always speaks the truth	May be based on Jansson's friend Eva Wichman and her lover Putte Foch
Fillyjonk	endless longing	
Misabel	infinite sorrow	
Toft	misses Moominmamma	male but could pass for a girl: has short fair hair, like Tove
Miffle	small and timid	Jansson said this was one of her self-portraits

== Books ==
Karjalainen suggests that her childhood reading influenced the Moomin books. She sees signs of The Jungle Book by Rudyard Kipling, the writings of Elsa Beskow, Lewis Carroll's Alice's Adventures in Wonderland, and Selma Lagerlöf's Nils Holgerssons underbara resa (The Wonderful Adventures of Nils).

The Bible influenced many of Jansson's Moomin stories. In Moominsummer Madness, Little My asks if this is the end of the world; the Mymble's daughter says everyone is soon going to go to heaven, and Little My replies "'Heaven? ... Do we have to? And how does one get down again?" Other biblical allusions include recurring floods. Jansson's maternal grandfather Fredrik Hammarsten was a priest: the Moomin website suggests that Jansson may have been protesting against her Christian upbringing.

The scholar of literature Mike Classon Frangos writes that Pappan och havet's Swedish title (literally "The Father and the Sea", translated as Moominpappa at Sea) "clearly alludes to Ernest Hemingway's [1952] The Old Man and the Sea, though the events of the novel build more closely on [Virginia] Woolf's [1927] To the Lighthouse", a modernist novel. Pappan och havet and the Moomin newspaper comic strip Moomin and the Sea share multiple story elements, but differ sharply in that the comic features an ongoing romance between Moomintroll and Snorkmaiden. Frangos comments that Jansson grows increasingly frustrated with "the gendered expectations of heteronormative romance" in the comic, remarking that her allusions to literary modernism are part of her satire of pretentious masculine literature, and that she was simultaneously "writing herself and her characters into a long genealogy of queer modernism."

Pappan och havet satirises the modern English novel

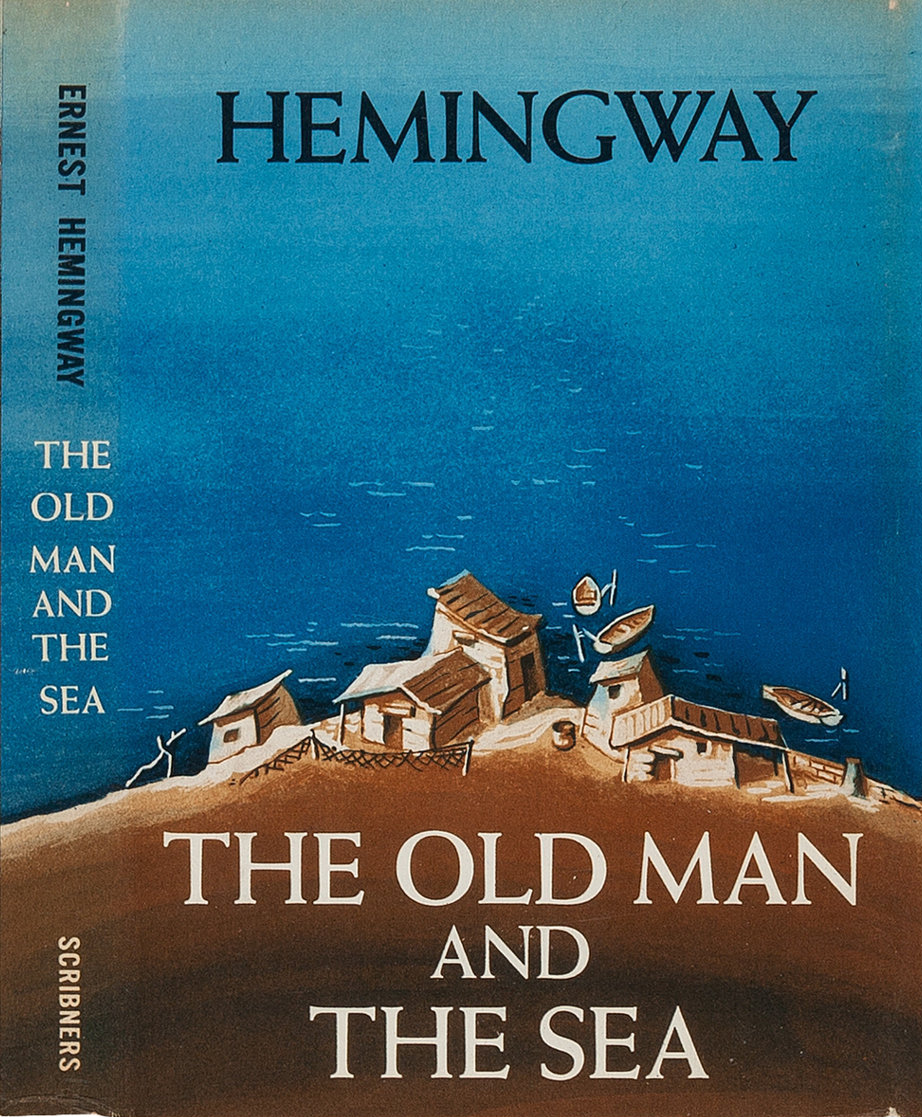
The title alludes to
Ernest Hemingway's
The Old Man and the Sea".

The content mirrors
Virginia Woolf's
To the Lighthouse.

== Sources ==
- Karjalainen, Tuula (2016) [2013]. Tove Jansson: Work and Love. Penguin Books. ISBN 978-0-141-97882-6.
