= The Exploits of Moominpappa =

1950 children's book by Tove Jansson

The Exploits of Moominpappa (Moominpappa's Memoirs)
- First edition (1950)
- Author: Tove Jansson
- Original title: Muminpappans Bravader: Skrivna av Honom Själv (1950); Muminpappans memoarer (1968)
- Translator: Thomas Warburton
- Illustrator: Tove Jansson
- Cover artist: Tove Jansson
- Language: Swedish
- Series: Moomins
- Genre: Children's novel
- Publication date: 1950
- Publication place: Finland
- English publication date: 1969
- Pages: 135
- ISBN: 0-14-030323-5 (English)
- OCLC: 51482720
- Preceded by: Finn Family Moomintroll
- Followed by: Moominsummer Madness

The Exploits of Moominpappa (Swedish: Muminpappans Bravader: Skrivna av Honom Själv, "Moominpappa's Exploits: Written by Himself"), first published in 1950 and then considerably revised in 1968 under the title Moominpappa's Memoirs (Muminpappans memoarer), is the fourth book in the Moomin series by Swedish-speaking Finnish writer Tove Jansson. The story found in this book is mentioned in the previous Moomin books, as Moominpappa writes his memoirs in those stories. Unlike Comet in Moominland and Finn Family Moomintroll, both versions of the novel were translated into English. Exploits of Moominpappa forms the basis of episodes 62, 63 and 64 in the 1990 TV series.

== Plot ==
Moominpappa has written his autobiography, describing his amazing life, and he tells it to his son Moomintroll, and to Moomintroll's friends, Sniff and Snufkin. In his tale, he at first was left at an orphanage, but after finding it boring and disliking the strict headmistress Hemulen, he leaves and meets a new friend, Hodgkins.

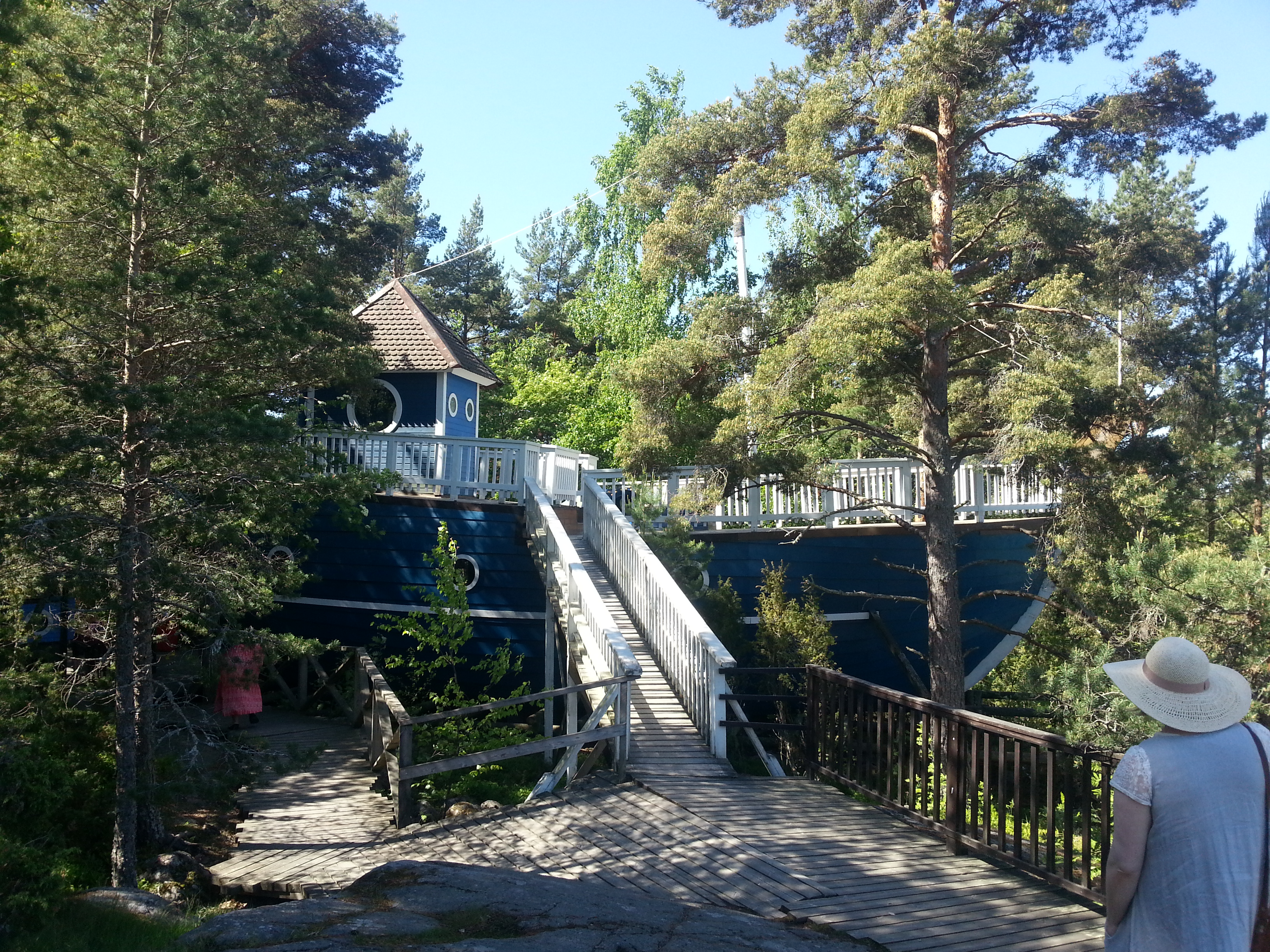
Moominpappa's boat, the Oshun Oxtra (Ocean Orchestra), Moominworld

Hodgkins and Moominpappa meet the Joxter (Snufkin's father) and the Muddler (Sniff's father). Together they build a boat, in which to live. They fool the enormous Edward the Booble into helping to set the ship off. After realising their trickery he becomes angry, but they sail away. They rescue a Hemulen from being eaten by The Groke, but the Hemulen is very bossy, and soon they abandon her with the Niblings. One young Nibling stows aboard their boat, and travels with them.

They eventually reach a faraway land, where they meet the Mymble family. The Mymble's daughter befriends them and together they go to Daddy Jones (the King's) 100th birthday party where they all win prizes. They then set up new homes on an island, but are spooked by the island ghost. They manage to make a deal with the ghost, and befriend him. Meanwhile, Hodgkins has designed the Amphibian – a sort of land/sea ship for Daddy Jones. On its maiden voyage, it is attacked by a giant fish, but they are saved when Edward the Booble steps on the fish.

The Muddler then marries the Fuzzy, and Moominpappa rescues another Moomin and her handbag from the sea. She turns out to be Moominmamma. The story ends, and links chronologically with The Moomins and the Great Flood.

In the epilogue, there is a knock at the door. When they answer the door, the family is surprised to see Hodgkins, the Joxter, the Mymble and her children, the Muddler, and the Fuzzy. After a joyous reunion on their verandah, Hodgkins announces he has brought the Amphibian with them, and proposes that all of them go on another adventure in it.

== Revised version ==
As with Comet in Moominland, Jansson made changes to the manuscript after its publication. The first version of The Exploits of Moominpappa was published in Swedish in 1950, and became the basis for some translations, including the first English translation. The final revised version was published in 1968, under a new title, Moominpappa's Memoirs (which was Jansson's preferred title for the original manuscript). The revised version and its new title became the basis for many subsequent translations. Moominpappa's Memoirs contains numerous edits and revisions, which include:

- A new, third-person narrative prologue, which opens in the Moominvalley: when the Moomins discuss mysterious trinkets from Moominpappa's past, he realizes that only he knows the actual history of the relics. This inspires him to write down his memoirs. Moominpappa also suggests that once the readers complete reading his memoirs, they should start reading them again.
- Several scenes, particularly Moominpappa's initial encounters with the characters (such as the Joxter) are expanded. The encounter between Moominpappa and the hedgehog is notably longer: it ends with Moominpappa inviting the hedgehog to his newly constructed house, before realizing that the house has only been built in his thoughts. Moominpappa, originally ashamed of the incident, eventually concludes that it was an early indication of his powerful imagination.
- The scene at the bottom of the sea is edited to appear scarier and more mysterious. Instead of conversing with one another and discussing the submarine, the deep sea fish flee in terror, and quietly warn the adventurers about an approaching danger: the Sea Hound, a giant, predatory aquatic monster with the head of a dog.
- More illustrations (e.g. of the Sea Hound) have been added throughout the text.

== Adaptations ==
The 1977-1982 animated, stop-motion Polish TV series, The Moomins adapted the novel into 9 episodes. The screenplay, supervised by Tove Jansson, followed the book closely, with a few minor changes and additions. For instance, more scenes are set in the Hemulen orphanage, which houses not only little Moomins.

== Reception ==
The book received positive reviews from critics.

Kirkus Reviews wrote, "Moominpappa's memoir is charming, his self-consciously formal language a delight. Completely winning."
