= Moomins and the Comet Chase =

- Theatrical release poster
- Directed by: Maria Lindberg
- Written by: Joel Backström; Iivo Baric; Anders Larsson; Minna Karvonen
- Based on: The Moomins by Tove Jansson
- Produced by: Tom Carpelan
- Starring: Stellan Skarsgård; Peter Stormare; Alexander Skarsgård; Mads Mikkelsen; Helena Mattsson
- Narrated by: Max von Sydow
- Cinematography: Maria Lindberg
- Edited by: Maria Lindberg
- Music by: Andrzej Rokicki; Björk (song "The Comet Song"); Heitor Pereira
- Production company: Stereoscape Ltd.
- Distributed by: Oy Filmkompaniet Alpha Ab; Universal Pictures
- Release dates: 6 August 2010; 22 October 2017 (United States)
- Running time: 75 minutes
- Country: Finland
- Languages: English; Finnish
- Budget: €974,893
- Box office: €9,300,000

Moomins and the Comet Chase is a 2010 3D stop motion animated fantasy adventure comedy family film compiled from the Comet in Moominland-based episodes of the 1977–1982 The Moomins television series animated at Se-ma-for in Poland, restored and re-soundtracked with multiple voice actors replacing the single narrator. It is the second such Moomin film produced by Finnish children's film company Filmkompaniet, the first being Moomin and Midsummer Madness, and the first one converted to stereoscopic 3-D. A similar revision of the remainder of the series for high-definition television of all 78 episodes was released in 2010. The same novel has been adapted into film at least twice before, with the 1978 Russian stop motion serial Mumi-troll and the 1992 Japanese traditional animation feature Comet in Moominland. The international version of the film features the voices of known Swedish actors like Stellan Skarsgård, Peter Stormare, Alexander Skarsgård. Musician and Moomins fan Björk also wrote an original song for the film. The international film debuted at the Cannes Film Festival in May 2010. In Finland, it arrived in movie theaters on 6 August 2010 and was later broadcast on the MTV3 channel. The film was also produced in dozens of other languages and subsequently received global distribution.

== Plot ==
One day Moomintroll wakes to notice that grey dust is covering everything in the Moominvalley. He runs to ask the philosophical Muskrat if he knows what is happening, who advises him that things tend to look like this before an awful fate coming from the sky hits the Earth. With the help of his father, Moominpappa, Moomintroll and his close friends Sniff and Snufkin build a raft and head out on a challenging journey to the observatory in the Lonely Mountains hoping to find out more from the wise professors there. The friends have to overcome several adversities in order to make it there. When they arrive, they find the professors deep in calculations. They reveal that a comet will reach the Earth in four days, four hours, four minutes and 44 seconds.

The group decides to get back home as fast as they can to share the news. On the journey home, they encounter more dangerous creatures and obstacles as well as some old and new friends, including Snork Maiden and her brother Snork, who join them on their adventure. The sky continues to become redder and the air hotter. When they get to the seashore, they are shocked to see that the sea has completely dried up. A walk along the dried out sea bottom brings more excitement and danger.

Eventually they make it back home to the Moominhouse and discover another shocking detail: the comet is supposed to land right in their own garden that very night. Ultimately, the big question is if they can get everybody to safety in time.

== Cast ==
(International / Finnish)

- Max von Sydow / Tapani Perttu as The Narrator
- Stellan Skarsgård as Moominpappa and Hemulens / Tapani Perttu as Moominpappa
- Alexander Skarsgård / Jasper Pääkkönen as Moomintroll
- Peter Stormare / Taneli Mäkelä as Snufkin
- Mads Mikkelsen / Ilpo Mikkonen as Sniff
- Helena Mattsson as Snork Maiden
- Kathleen Fee / Johanna Viksten as Moominmamma
- Arthur Holden / Jarmo Koski as Snork
- Jarmo Koski as Hemulen
- Terrence Scammell / Jarmo Koski as Muskrat

== Soundtrack ==
- "The Comet Song" – Björk and Sjón Sigurdsson

== Release ==
The film was released theatrically on 6 August 2010 by Oy Filmkompaniet Alpha Ab and was later broadcast on the MTV3 channel. It was also released on DVD by NonStop Sales and opened the Cannes Film Festival in May 2010. In the United States, the film received a video-on-demand and DVD release by Vision Films on April 12, 2016.

== Music ==
Icelanders Björk and Sjón, both big fans of the Moomin franchise, composed "The Comet Song" for the film's soundtrack. Antonia Ringbom, a Finnish director, producer, animator and illustrator who specializes in children's programming, is working on the project's title sequence, which combines her animation with the theme song performed by Björk. Bjork said: "I read the books as a child and then I read them for my children. I guess I realised that I still like them just as much. They probably stand for something Nordic, I think there's something quite stark, a certain kind of simplicity. You could speculate and say, 'because there are fewer plants there, and fewer animals, fewer buildings, so it's kind of more minimal. I've sometimes compared it to Scandinavian furniture, compared to Italian furniture. Italian - hundreds of little details, curls and curves and decoration - and Scandinavian furniture is kind of naked. And it's funny and sad at the same time. And the relationship to nature Tove Jansson has, that's very important to me. And everybody's allowed to be just as eccentric as they are, they don't have to conform. Reading to my children I actually noticed some kind of anti-authority aspect in it – there's no hierarchy between the characters, they are all equal. I like that a lot."
