= The Moomins (TV series) =

Polish stop motion animated TV series

- Based on: Moomin by Tove Jansson and Lars Jansson
- Written by: Maria Kossakowska; Lucjan Dębiński
- Music by: Andrzej Rokicki
- Countries of origin: Poland; Austria; West Germany
- No. of episodes: 78

Production
- Running time: 10 minutes
- Production companies: Se-ma-for; Jupiter Film

Original release
- Network: TVP1
- Release: 19 November 1978 – 1982

The Moomins (Polish: Opowiadania Muminków, lit. 'Moomins' Short Stories', German: Die Mumins) is a stop motion animated children's television series. It is based on the Moomin series of books by Finnish writer Tove Jansson. It was produced by Polish company Se-ma-for and Austrian company Jupiter Film between 1977 and 1982 for Polish, Austrian and German television. It was first broadcast on TVP1 beginning on 19 November 1978.

The series was later sold to other countries including the UK. The British version was adapted by Anne Wood at FilmFair for ITV Central and broadcast in the UK. Series 1 was first shown on Monday 24 January 1983 at 4:15 pm and series 2 on Monday 7 January 1985 at 4.15pm on Children's ITV, and series 2 was repeated in 1986. The series was last repeated in its entirety in 1988. The series was also U.S. aired on Broadcast syndication in October 1983 to June 1987 and later shown on PBS in August 1985 to December 1994. It was narrated by British actor Richard Murdoch.

This series was the fourth series to be made based on the Moomin books. Two more were subsequently made. It is one of the two best-known Moomin series (along with the 1990 animated version Moomin). The 1977–1982 stop-motion version has been criticised for being scary in places and rather dark in tone for the young audience at which it was aimed. It is, in contrast to the 1990s series, widely believed to be the most faithful TV adaptation of Tove Jansson's stories, and much closer to her vision. Tove herself had a great deal of involvement during the series' production and was very happy with it (as revealed in an interview with Anne Wood in Simon Sheridan's 2007 book The A to Z of Classic Children's Television). The scripts for each episode were translated from Polish into Swedish and sent to Tove and Lars Jansson, who, if they felt that anything needed to be changed, corrected the script, expanding or rewriting it; afterwards, the scripts were sent back and only then did production of the particular episode begin.

In 2010, an HD version of the series was released. It was later followed by a new US-produced English dub in 2017.

== Music ==
The series had an orchestral score, composed by Andrzej Rokicki, with a whimsical opening theme, resembling the melody of a songbird. The German and Austrian dub retained most of the score, and added themes written by Eugen Illin, who also composed a different opening theme. For the shortened and re-edited UK release, a new score was composed by Graeme Miller and Steve Shill. Its opening titles featured a bouncy theme tune consisting of flutes and synthesizers, played against a popular still of Moomintroll holding a hat.

== Episode list ==
The original Polish series consisted of 78 ten-minute episodes, narrated initially by Stanisław Wyszyński, and subsequently by Stanisław Kwaśniak. The German and Austrian dub retained the full length of the original series, with the narration provided by Hans Clarin. The UK adaptation was shortened and re-edited into 100 five-minute episodes, narrated by Richard Murdoch.

Series 1 of the UK release consisted of 50 episodes, and was first broadcast Mondays to Fridays at 4:15 pm, 24 January to 6 April 1983 on Children's ITV. Series 2 consisting of another 50 episodes first aired Monday to Fridays at 4:15 pm, 7 January to 15 March 1985 on Children's ITV.

=== Series one ===
UK broadcast date	Title	Novel inspiration
24.01.1983	Hobgoblin's Hat	Finn Family Moomintroll
25.01.1983	Magic Clouds	Finn Family Moomintroll
26.01.1983	King of California	Finn Family Moomintroll
27.01.1983	The Ant Lion	Finn Family Moomintroll
28.01.1983	Canaries & Raspberry Juice	Finn Family Moomintroll
31.01.1983	The Indoor Jungle	Finn Family Moomintroll
01.02.1983	Thingumy and Bob	Finn Family Moomintroll
02.02.1983	The Trial of the Groke	Finn Family Moomintroll
03.02.1983	Snufkin's Leaving	Finn Family Moomintroll
04.02.1983	The Ruby	Finn Family Moomintroll
07.02.1983	The Great Search	Finn Family Moomintroll
08.02.1983	The Party	Finn Family Moomintroll
09.02.1983	Hobgoblin Arrives At the Party	Finn Family Moomintroll
10.02.1983	Special Wishes	Finn Family Moomintroll
11.02.1983	The Voyage	Finn Family Moomintroll
14.02.1983	Attack of the Hattifatteners	Finn Family Moomintroll
15.02.1983	The Barometer	Finn Family Moomintroll
16.02.1983	Island Treasures	Finn Family Moomintroll
17.02.1983	Return to Moominvalley	Finn Family Moomintroll
18.02.1983	Invisible Child	Tales from Moominvalley
21.02.1983	The Cure	Tales from Moominvalley
22.02.1983	Christmas	Tales from Moominvalley
23.02.1983	Winter	Moominland Midwinter
24.02.1983	Little My Goes Skating	Moominland Midwinter
25.02.1983	Moomintroll and Little My	Moominland Midwinter
28.02.1983	The Lady of the Cold	Moominland Midwinter
01.03.1983	Ancestor	Moominland Midwinter
02.03.1983	Healthy Hemulen	Moominland Midwinter
03.03.1983	Sorry-oo	Moominland Midwinter
04.03.1983	Sorry-oo and the Wolves	Moominland Midwinter
07.03.1983	The Winter Bonfire	Moominland Midwinter
08.03.1983	Return of the Sun	Moominland Midwinter
09.03.1983	The Great Thaw	Moominland Midwinter
10.03.1983	The Fillyjonk	Tales from Moominvalley
11.03.1983	Catastrophe	Tales from Moominvalley
14.03.1983	Moomintroll & the Dragon	Tales from Moominvalley
16.03.1983	Moomintroll's Pet	Tales from Moominvalley
17.03.1983	Memoirs	Memoirs of Moominpappa
18.03.1983	The Orphan	Memoirs of Moominpappa
21.03.1983	Hodgkins & the Sailor	Memoirs of Moominpappa
22.03.1983	Edward the Booble	Memoirs of Moominpappa
23.03.1983	Moomintroll to the Rescue	Memoirs of Moominpappa
24.03.1983	The Storm	Memoirs of Moominpappa
25.03.1983	The King	Memoirs of Moominpappa
28.03.1983	Island Ghost	Memoirs of Moominpappa
29.03.1983	Flying Boat	Memoirs of Moominpappa
30.03.1983	The Muddler's Marriage	Memoirs of Moominpappa
31.03.1983	Love Story	Memoirs of Moominpappa
05.04.1983	The Volcano	Moominsummer Madness
06.04.1983	The Island	Moominsummer Madness

=== Series two ===
UK broadcast date	Title	Novel inspiration
07.01.1985	The Haunted Theatre	Moominsummer Madness
08.01.1985	Misabel's Hairdo	Moominsummer Madness
09.01.1985	Emma the Theatre Rat	Moominsummer Madness
10.01.1985	A Night in the Trees	Moominsummer Madness
11.01.1985	Astonished Awakening	Moominsummer Madness
14.01.1985	The Parkkeeper's Surprise	Moominsummer Madness
15.01.1985	The Fillyjonk	Moominsummer Madness
16.01.1985	Creepy Magic	Moominsummer Madness
17.01.1985	The Naughty Woodies	Moominsummer Madness
18.01.1985	Snufkin's Invitation	Moominsummer Madness
21.01.1985	In Jail	Moominsummer Madness
22.01.1985	Tea with the Hemulen's Niece	Moominsummer Madness
23.01.1985	Dress Rehearsal	Moominsummer Madness
24.01.1985	The Performance	Moominsummer Madness
25.01.1985	The Confrontation	Moominsummer Madness
28.01.1985	The Gadfly	Moomin & the Golden Tail, Moomin comic strips
29.01.1985	The Cure	Moomin & the Golden Tail, Moomin comic strips
30.01.1985	The Cocktail Party	Moomin & the Golden Tail, Moomin comic strips
31.01.1985	Cedric	Tales from Moominvalley
01.02.1985	Mr. Brisk	Moomins Winter Follies, Moomin comic strips
04.02.1985	The Jungle	Moominvalley turns Jungle, Moomin comic strips
05.02.1985	The Tigers	Moominvalley turns Jungle, Moomin comic strips
06.02.1985	The Hunters	Moominvalley turns Jungle, Moomin comic strips
07.02.1985	The Funfair	Moomin and the Brigands, Moomin comic strips
08.02.1985	The Hemulen Aunt	Moomin and Aunt Jane, Moomin comic strips
11.02.1985	The Orphan	Moomin Winter, Moomin comic strips
12.02.1985	The Vampire	Moomin & the Vampire, Moomin comic strips
13.02.1985	The Vampire Escapes	Moomin & the Vampire, Moomin comic strips
14.02.1985	The Friendly Vampire	Moomin & the Vampire, Moomin comic strips
15.02.1985	The Nice Bat	Moomin & the Vampire, Moomin comic strips
18.02.1985	Mamma's Island	Moominpappa at Sea
19.02.1985	Mamma's Painting	Moominpappa at Sea
20.02.1985	The Terrible Island Storm	Moominpappa at Sea
21.02.1985	The Disappearing Moomins	Moomin & the Martians, Moomin comic strips
22.02.1985	The Little Martian	Moomin & the Martians, Moomin comic strips
25.02.1985	The Martian Goes Home	Moomin & the Martians, Moomin comic strips
26.02.1985	The Discoveries	Comet in Moominland
27.02.1985	The Muskrat's Prediction	Comet in Moominland
28.02.1985	The Journey	Comet in Moominland
01.03.1985	The Underground Waterfall	Comet in Moominland
04.03.1985	The Giant Eagle	Comet in Moominland
05.03.1985	The Observatory	Comet in Moominland
06.03.1985	The Rockfall	Comet in Moominland
07.03.1985	Moomintroll to the Rescue	Comet in Moominland
08.03.1985	The Village Shop	Comet in Moominland
11.03.1985	The Dance	Comet in Moominland
12.03.1985	The Dead Sea	Comet in Moominland
13.03.1985	Locust Attack	Comet in Moominland
14.03.1985	The Tornado	Comet in Moominland
15.03.1985	The Comet	Comet in Moominland

The order above is the correct broadcast order, for when the episodes were first shown on UK television in 1983 (taken from the original script list). The episode order in the recent DVD boxset was changed, so that the English episodes were intended to match the German broadcast order (but they were in fact different). In the UK, the series ended with the Comet in Moominland story. Series 1 was shown in 1983 and series 2 in 1985. Series 2 was repeated in 1986. The series was also repeated in its entirety in 1988. (Confirmed by the sleeve notes from Finders Keepers Moomin soundtrack release 2016).

== Home release ==
A Region 2 DVD boxset was released in 2004, in both English and German editions (both versions manufactured in Austria).

Single DVD releases are also available, which contain English and German episodes. The German episodes have English subtitles and the English episodes have German subtitles.

The complete series in its original Polish version, which was longer than the UK re-edit and had a different musical score, was released in Poland in 2009, as a 5-DVD Region 2 box set.

== Films ==
- Moomin and Midsummer Madness was released in 2008, based on a compilation of Episodes 51–65.
- Moomins and the Comet Chase was released in 2010, based on a compilation of Episodes 88–100.
- Moomins and the Winter Wonderland was released in 2017, based on a compilation of Episodes 23–33.
- The Exploits of Moominpappa - Adventures of a Young Moomin was released in 2021, based on a compilation of Episodes 28–36.
