= Stereoscape =

Startup productivity tech company

Stereoscape Oy is a Finnish company based in Helsinki that develops interactive 3D and digital visualisation applications. The company's work has included stereoscopic 3D production, augmented and virtual reality, interactive product visualisation and digital applications for business and industrial use.

== History ==
Stereoscape Oy was registered in Finland in December 2006. The company's early activities focused on stereoscopic 3D production and visualisation. Stereoscape participated in the stereoscopic production of the 2010 animated film Moomins and the Comet Chase (Muumi ja punainen pyrstötähti), which was based on material from the Polish stop-motion television series produced between 1978 and 1982. The film's 2D-to-3D conversion was carried out by Stereoscape in Finland and Quality eXperience Design in Japan, in cooperation with Aalto University and Waseda University. During the following years, the company expanded from stereoscopic film production into other forms of 3D visualisation and interactive technology. In 2011, Stereoscape expanded its international activities by establishing a sales office and showroom in London, with its activities at the time including stereoscopic and glasses-free 3D applications. The company subsequently expanded its activities into augmented reality (AR), virtual reality (VR) and interactive 3D applications. Stereoscape participated in the Business Finland Luovimo programme in 2017–2018. According to a Business Finland programme evaluation, the company used the programme to revise its value proposition and shifted its focus from consumer markets to business-to-business customers. Stereoscape also participated in VARPU (Virtual and Augmented Reality Production and Use), a Finnish research and development consortium involving universities, research organisations and companies. The consortium, active in 2017–2018, comprised 18 partners and had a total budget of approximately €10 million.

== Activities ==
Stereoscape develops interactive 3D and visualisation applications for business and industrial uses. Its activities have included product visualisation, sales and marketing applications, training applications, and tools based on augmented and virtual reality.
