= Moominvalley =

Fictional setting by Tove Jansson

- Moomin location
- Map drawn by Tove Jansson for Finn Family Moomintroll
- First appearance: The Moomins and the Great Flood (1945)
- Created by: Tove Jansson
- Genre: Children's fantasy

In-universe information
- Type: Valley
- Races: Moomins, Fillyjonks, Hattifatteners, Hemulens, Mymbles, Snorks, Toffles, Whompers
- Locations: Moominhouse
- Characters: Moomintroll, The Groke, Little My, Sniff, Snorkmaiden, Snufkin

Moominvalley (Swedish: Mumindalen) is a fictional place where the Moomins live, in the tales by the Finland Swedish author Tove Jansson.

== Analysis ==
Especially in the early books, Moominvalley is depicted as a beautiful place with green slopes, rivers, fruit trees, flowers and a place for calm and peaceful life as in the tradition of pastoral poetry, and yet it is still threatened by natural forces such as flooding and volcanoes. The valley is surrounded by Lonely Mountains in the east and by other mountains in the south, while the west faces the sea. Thus, travel on land is often preceded by mountain climbing in the stories. It was inspired by Ängsmarn, a family retreat in Sweden, which is also situated on a grassy field facing the sea and surrounded by rocky outcrops.

The scholar of literature Boel Westin writes that Moominvalley was discovered after and caused by the "Great Flood". The 1945 book The Moomins and the Great Flood was, she states, the "creation myth of moominology", and she quotes the moment of its discovery. As they approach, beauty emerges:

All day they walked, and wherever they went it was beautiful, for after the rain the most wonderful flowers had come out everywhere and the trees had both flowers and fruits.

They go on walking, and things get even better:

At last they came to a small valley that was more beautiful than anything they had seen earlier in the day. And there, in the midst of the meadow, stood a house that looked almost like a stove.

The nonfiction writer Heikki Niemeläinen suggests in his book Toven ja Marian Meilahti – Kartalla ja raastuvassa ("Tove and Maria's Meilahti – On the Map and in the Courtroom") that Helsinki's Meilahti likely served as inspiration for Moominvalley by comparing the map of Moominvalley drawn by Jansson and the map base of the National Land Survey of Finland. Meilahti was otherwise a familiar area for Jansson, who lived in Töölö.

The Moominvalley is a manifestation of Jansson's escapism; she often fantasized about establishing a colony in Morocco or moving to The Basque Country or Tonga. According to her biographer Tuula Karjalainen, "Tove found her hiding place in Moominvalley, but it was a place from which she could always return."

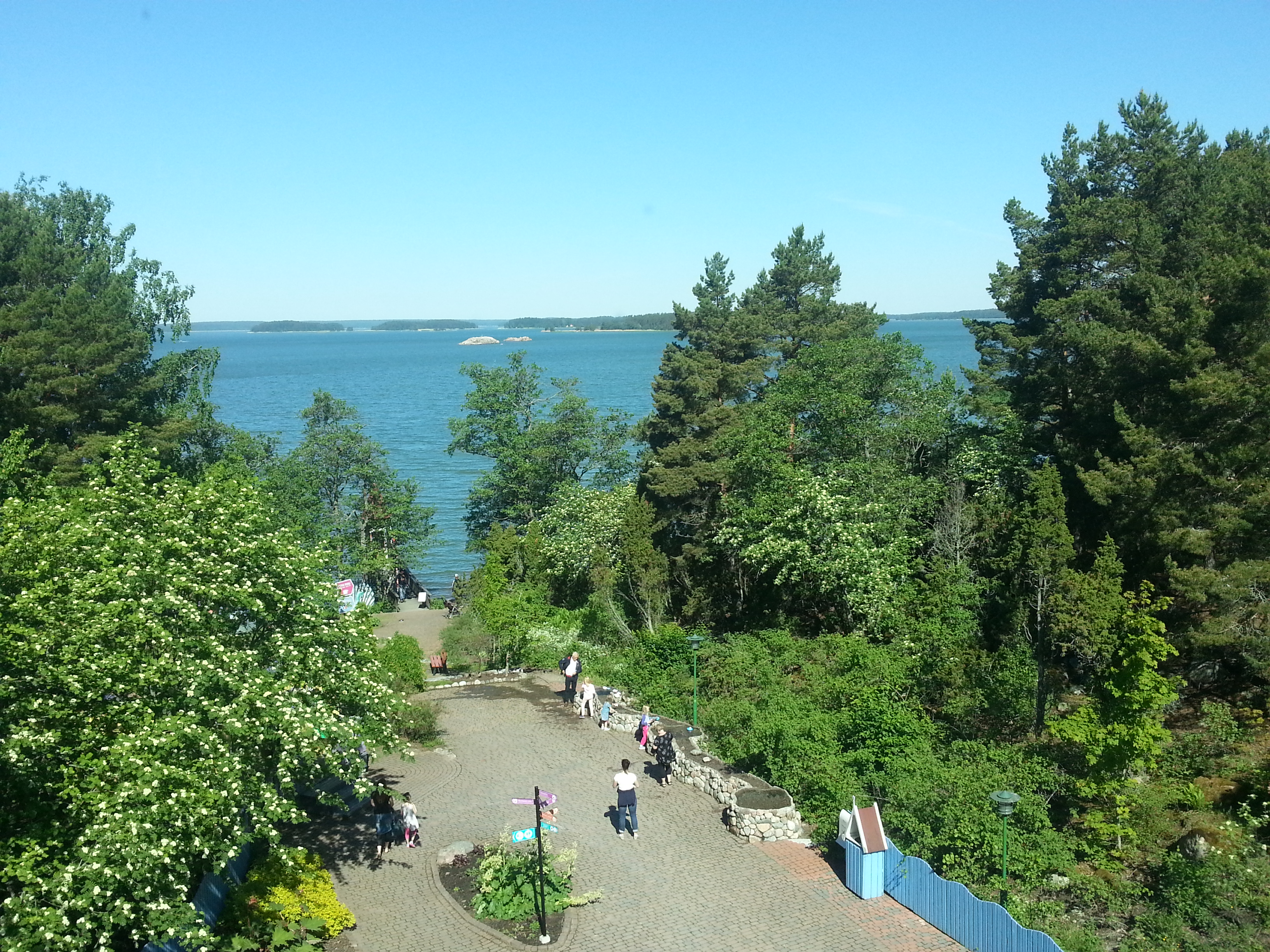
Moominworld's version of Moominvalley, leading down to the sea

== Sources ==
- Karjalainen, Tuula (2016) [2013]. Tove Jansson: Work and Love. Penguin Books. ISBN 978-0-141-97882-6.
- Westin, Boel (2014). Tove Jansson Life, Art, Words: The Authorised Biography. Translated by Mazzarella, Silvester. Sort of Books. ISBN 978-1-908745-45-3.
