= Hagfors (surname) =

Hagfors is a surname. Notable people with the surname include:

- Irja Hagfors (1905–1988), Finnish dance artist, choreographer and dance teacher
- Johan Fridolf Hagfors (1857–1931), Swedish newspaper publisher, music critic and composer
- Martin Hagfors (born 1960), Norwegian-American musician and songwriter
