= Finn Family Moomintroll =

1948 children's book by Tove Jansson

- First edition
- Author: Tove Jansson
- Original title: Trollkarlens hatt
- Translator: Elizabeth Portch
- Illustrator: Tove Jansson
- Cover artist: Tove Jansson
- Language: Swedish
- Series: Moomins
- Genre: Children's novel
- Publisher: Schildts in Finland; Ernest Benn in UK
- Publication date: 1948
- Publication place: Finland
- English publication date: 1950 (UK), 1951 (US)
- Pages: 150
- ISBN: 978-0-14-030150-2 (English)
- OCLC: 271863094
- Preceded by: Comet in Moominland
- Followed by: The Exploits of Moominpappa

The first English edition in 1950 made the book and Tove Jansson famous. The cover illustration by Jansson shows Moominpappa wearing the Hobgoblin's magical hat.

Finn Family Moomintroll (original Swedish title Trollkarlens hatt, literally 'The Magician's Hat'; (Note: Trollkarl, rendered 'Hobgoblin' in the English translation of the book, can be translated as sorcerer, wizard, or magician.) US edition The Happy Moomins) is the third in the series of Moomin books by Swedish-speaking Finnish writer Tove Jansson, published in Swedish in 1948 and translated to English in 1950. It owes its title in translation to the fact that it was the first Moomin book to be published in English, and was actually marketed as the first in the series until the 1980s. The English translation made her famous internationally; the book has since been translated into many languages. It forms the basis of episodes 1–8 in the 1990 TV series.

Commentators have noted that the book offers deeper meanings than simply a story of a magical hat creating havoc, including the importance of exchanging gifts, and the centrality of unconditional love as the basis for action. They note, too, that the inseparable characters Thingumy and Bob are in Swedish Tofslan and Vifslan, the pet names of Tove and her lover Vivica Bandler.

== Context ==
Trollkarlens hatt was the third Moomin book to be published in the original Swedish. (Note: The first two books were Småtrollen och den stora översvämningen (The Moomins and the Great Flood, 1945) and Kometjakten/Kometen kommer (Comet in Moominland, 1946); Trollkarlens hatt came out in 1948, published in Finland by Schildts.) The quite different English title Finn Family Moomintroll arose from the fact that it was the first Moomin book to be published in English (it was published by Ernest Benn in London in 1950), and was actually marketed as the first in the series until the 1980s. The English translation provided Tove Jansson with a breakthrough, making her famous internationally. A specific result was that Jansson gained the profitable business of drawing a regular Moomin comic strip six days a week for a London newspaper, The Evening News.

== Plot ==
Moomintroll, Sniff and Snufkin discover the Hobgoblin's top hat on a mountain-top, unaware of its strange powers. An egg shell discarded into the hat becomes five clouds the children ride and play with. Next day the clouds have disappeared and nobody knows where they came from. Moomintroll hides inside the hat during a game of hide-and-seek and is temporarily transformed beyond recognition.

Once they discover the magic powers of the hat and use it for a few transformations, the family resolves to get rid of it and throw it into the river. But Moomintroll and Snufkin recover it at night and hide it in the cave by the sea, where the Muskrat is spooked when his dentures transform into something mysterious and terrifying.

The Moomin Family travel to the Island of the Hattifatteners on a boat they have found, and the Moominhouse is transformed into a jungle when Moominmamma absent-mindedly drops a ball of poisonous pink perennials into the hat. At night the jungle withers, and it is used as firewood to cook the huge Mameluke that the children previously caught while fishing.

Thingumy and Bob arrive clutching a large suitcase containing the King's Ruby, which they stole from the Groke. After a court case (presided over by the Snork) the Groke agrees to exchange the ruby for the Hobgoblin's Hat. Thingumy and Bob steal Moominmamma's handbag to use as a bed, but return it when they realise how upset she is. The Moomins hold a party to celebrate the finding of Moominmamma's handbag, during which the Hobgoblin arrives (with a new hat) demanding the King's Ruby, but is refused by Thingumy and Bob.

To cheer himself up, the Hobgoblin grants everyone at the party a wish. Although not everyone gets exactly what they wished for, the Hobgoblin is delighted when Thingumy and Bob wish for a duplicate ruby to give him – the Queen’s Ruby. (As it turns out, the Hobgoblin can grant the wishes of others, but not his own.)

== Reception ==
The Guardian wrote that "a Hobgoblin's magic hat ... creates total havoc in Moominvalley", and recommends the story, and all the Moomin books, for "anyone over six". Ida Fellman, on the Finnish national broadcaster Yle, writes that everything that is placed in the magical hat is transformed, resulting in a series of strange events.

Håkan Kristensson, on Dagensbok.com, writes that Tove Jansson makes Trollkarlens hatt an explosion of fantasy, and that it was the book that made her famous internationally. In his view, this was with good reason, as the book shows off her flashes of humour, her skilful depiction of character and descriptions of nature, her unrivalled imagination, and her fine illustrations. He notes, too, that deeper interpretations of the narrated events are possible.

Barnpedagogen.se comments that Jansson's writing in the book is fantastic, with entertaining remarks and asides to the reader, and characters with very different personalities. The reviewer is less sure she likes the hints of deeper philosophical meanings in the story.

== Analysis ==
The scholar of English literature Reuben Sanchez suggests that children like the book not just because it is entertaining, but because it is didactic, i.e. that it teaches something. Sanchez states that the lesson is "the importance of gift giving", illustrated by characters who understand the exchange of gifts and some who do not. In his view, children are "demanding readers", requiring authors to embody morals and values; he comments that "great books, whether for adults or for children, teach something worth learning."

Nancy Huse writes in the Children's Literature Association Quarterly that the book is "filled with the terrors of the unpredictable", and that as in all the Moomin books, Jansson "celebrate[s] the reality a child knows, with its alternating terror and joy." Huse adds that Moominmamma is the only person who recognises her child despite the transformation wreaked by the magical hat; in her view, this is an instance of Moominmamma's "unconditioned, intuitive love and its role as the basis for action and the central value" in the Moomin books.

Yvonne Grönlund, analysing the handling of names in Elizabeth Portch's English version, states that the translation strategy is evidently that of retaining the original association of the Swedish names, rather than (in the translator James S. Holmes's framework) of re-creating fresh associations. Retention is seen in Portch's translation of Mumindalen as "The Valley of the Moomins", and in Kingsley Hart and Thomas Warburton's rendering "Moominvalley" (in several other Moomin books). Similarly, Ensliga bergen, home of the Groke, is rendered retentively as "The Lonely Mountains". The Groke is a retentive translation of Mårran: the original name recalls the Swedish verb att morra, "to growl", and, she writes, the English name 'Groke' sounds like a creature that might growl. On the other hand, Trollkarl, literally 'magician, wizard', is rendered "The Hobgoblin"; this offers English readers a range of associations from traditional frightening bogey to comic book villain, and is thus in Grönlund's view re-creative.

The pair called "Thingumy and Bob" in English (from 'thingummybob', something whose name one has forgotten) are in the original Tofslan and Vifslan, the pet names of Tove (Jansson) and her theatre director lover Vivica Bandler, a subtlety lost in translation. The couple always appear together, and have a private language that only they understand. In Swedish, their language adds their pet names' suffix "-sla" to words, as in Begripslar du allsla? for Begriper du alls? ("Can you understand anything?"). That very personal touch is replaced in translation by the English habit of spoonerism, swapping the first letters of a pair of words in each sentence. Elizabeth Lovatt, writing for Penguin Books, notes that Jansson was always quiet about her sexuality, but "found ways to celebrate her loves in the world of Moominvalley." Lovatt comments that given this real-world context, the couple's "shiny red gem that must be hidden from others" becomes much easier to understand. Jansson wrote in a letter to Bandler "P.S. After a long break I have started a new chapter of Moomin 3 [Trollkarlens hatt]. It's all about Tofslan and Vifslan. And the Groke."

== Translations and adaptations ==
Finn Family Moomintroll was the first of Jansson's Moomin books to appear in English, in 1950. Trollkarlens hatt has since been translated into many languages, including Arabic, Bulgarian, Chinese, Czech, Danish, Finnish, French, German, Hebrew, Hungarian, Italian, Japanese, Latvian, Norwegian, Persian, Polish, Portuguese, Romanian, Russian, Serbian, Slovak, Slovenian, Spanish, Turkish, Ukrainian, and Vietnamese.

A Finnish stage version of the book, presented in 1996–1997, has been made in collaboration with the Friends of Moomins Association (Muumien ystävät -yhdistys) and the Tampere Theatre. The play was dramatized by Annukka Kiuru and directed by Lisbeth Nyström. The music was composed by Heikki Mäenpää.

An audio book narrated by Hugh Dennis was released in 2012 by Puffin Books.

== See also ==
- Moominvalley in November – the sombre final book in the series
