= Snufkin: Melody of Moominvalley =

2024 video game

- Developer: Hyper Games
- Publisher: Raw Fury
- Series: Moomins
- Engine: Unity
- Platforms: macOS; Microsoft Windows; Nintendo Switch; PlayStation 5; Xbox Series X/S
- Release: macOS, Switch, Windows; 7 March 2024; PS5, Xbox Series X/S; 17 December 2024
- Genre: Adventure
- Mode: Single-player

Snufkin: Melody of Moominvalley (Note: Bokmål: Snusmumrikken: Melodien i Mummidalen, Swedish: Snusmumriken: Mumindalens melodi, Finnish: Nuuskamuikkunen: Muumilaakson melodia) is a 2024 video game based on the Moomins franchise. The player controls the wanderer Snufkin as he restores a dilapidated Moominvalley and tries to find his missing friend, Moomintroll, who was kidnapped by the game’s main antagonist, the Park Keeper. The game was developed by Hyper Games and published by Raw Fury.

Fuddler's Courtship, a DLC of the game, was released on 17 December 2024. A spiritual successor, Moomintroll: Winter's Warmth, was released on 27 April 2026.

== Development ==
The idea of a Moomin game came to Are Sundnes as he was reading Who Will Comfort Toffle? to his son during paternity leave, and he began discussing it with the team at his Norwegian game studio Hyper Games. Early in development the player character was switched from Toffle to Snufkin, whom Sundnes remarked to be popular and well-suited for an adventure game based on exploration. The game's storyline is partly inspired from the 1954 book Moominsummer Madness.

Having decided that violence was against the spirit of Moomins, the developers set out to find gameplay alternatives. Thus, Snufkin's music became a game mechanic.

Moomin Characters, which owns the intellectual property rights and is known for their strictness about it, watched over development closely, ensuring the portrayals met their standards. According to Sundnes, Moomin Characters was enthusiastic about the game throughout and only minor tweaks were needed for the most part.

The soundtrack includes music from the Icelandic post-rock band Sigur Rós, with several tracks taken from their album (), as well as original compositions by Oda Tilset.

== Reception ==
Reception

Aggregate scores
Aggregator	Score
Metacritic	PC: 83/100; NS: 81/100
OpenCritic	88% recommend

Review scores
Publication	Score
Destructoid	8/10
Eurogamer	4/5
Famitsu	32/40
Nintendo Life	8.7/10
The Guardian	3/5

The review aggregation website Metacritic has summarised reviews of the game as "generally favorable". According to OpenCritic 88% of critics have recommended the game. In Japan, four critics from Famitsu gave the game a total score of 32 out of 40, with each critic awarding the game an 8 out of 10.
