= Moominsummer Madness =

1954 children's book by Tove Jansson

- First edition
- Author: Tove Jansson
- Original title: Farlig midsommar
- Translator: Thomas Warburton
- Language: Swedish
- Series: Moomins
- Genre: Children's novel
- Publisher: Schildts
- Publication date: 1954
- Publication place: Finland
- English publication date: 1955
- ISBN: 0140305017 (English)
- Preceded by: The Exploits of Moominpappa
- Followed by: Moominland Midwinter

Moominsummer Madness (Swedish title Farlig midsommar, "Dangerous Midsummer") is the fifth in the series of Moomin books by the Swedish-speaking Finnish artist and writer Tove Jansson, published by Schildts in 1954. Critics have described the book's themes as theatre and how to deal with loneliness.

== Plot ==
A nearby volcano causes a massive wave to flood Moominvalley. While escaping the flood, the Moomin family and their friends find a building floating past, and take up residence there. They believe it is a deserted house until they realise someone else lives there, Emma, who explains that it is not a house but a theatre. The Moomins start to understand about the scenery, props, and costumes they have found.

The theatre drifts aground, and Moomintroll and the Snorkmaiden decide to go and sleep in a tree. When they wake next morning, the theatre has floated away again and they are alone. Meanwhile, Little My accidentally falls overboard, and by some strange coincidence is rescued by Moomintroll's adventurous friend Snufkin who is setting off to seek revenge on a grumpy Park Keeper. Snufkin tears down all the "Do not walk on the grass" notices, fills the lawns with electric Hattifatteners and sets free twenty-four small woodies who immediately adopt him as their father. The coincidences continue as Moonmintroll and the Snorkmaiden meet Emma's deceased husband's niece, the Fillyjonk, and all three get arrested burning the signs that Snufkin tore up.

Meanwhile, in the theatre, Emma helps Moominpappa write a play, and the family decide to stage it. The woodies find a playbill for the play and cajole Snufkin into taking them to the theatre. The Hemulen, who has arrested Fillyjonk, Moomintroll, and the Snork Maiden, also finds a playbill and leaves his cousin to guard the prisoners while he heads off to see the play. The cousin is persuaded of their innocence and lets them out to go to the play too. Everyone is reunited and ends up on stage, the play itself collapsing into a big reunion party. When the floods recede, everyone goes home.

== Reception ==
Hanna Lager, on Sweden's Feministbiblioteket, commented that she did not like Farlig midsommar as a child, finding its use of a flood nasty, but as an adult found the book "as amazing as the other books", and the tale of how Snufkin rebelled and then accepted his role as an adopted father "wonderful".

Charlotte Boulay, on Fiction Writers Review, writes that the book begins with a hand-drawn map, providing "both anticipation and reassurance", that exciting things are about to take place. The ink drawings of the characters, too, save Jansson the time of describing them, Boulay writes, so she can get on with the plot, at a brisk pace. She comments that the complex cast can be somewhat overwhelming, and recalls that when she was seven, she spent time explaining the characters to everyone. She finds the writing completely free of condescension, but "plenty of irony and sly wit that adults will enjoy." She comments that a book's quality can be measured by how easily the reader forgets that it contains a message. Jansson, in her view, puts the plot first, but the book contains messages nonetheless: that lonely people can be helped with kindness; that loneliness can make authority figures bossy or cruel; that people need to sit down somewhere quiet to reflect on how they feel, so solitude too offers a chance to learn.

The major theme of the novel is theatre, described by Jansson's biographer Boel Westin as an infuriating but ultimately rewarding process.

== Adaptations ==
An English translation by Thomas Warburton was published in paperback by Penguin Books in 2003.

The novel forms the basis of episodes 28–30 in the 1990 TV series. These were reassembled into Moomin and Midsummer Madness, a 2008 Finnish-produced compilation movie.

Moominsummer Madness was adapted for the stage of the Royal & Derngate Theatre, Northampton, in 2014, by Phil Porter. The production used knee-high puppets, and was accompanied by the music of Ben Glasstone. Clare Brennan described the adaptation as excellent in The Observer.

Part of the novel's plot served as inspiration for the 2024 video game Snufkin: Melody of Moominvalley.
