= Tales from Moominvalley =

1962 children's book by Tove Jansson

- First edition (Swedish)
- Author: Tove Jansson
- Translator: Thomas Warburton
- Language: Swedish
- Series: Moomins
- Genre: Children's novel
- Publisher: Schildts
- Publication date: 1962
- Publication place: Finland
- Preceded by: Moominland Midwinter
- Followed by: Moominpappa at Sea

Tales from Moominvalley (Swedish: Det osynliga barnet och andra berättelser, literally 'The Invisible Child and other stories') is the seventh book in the Moomins series by Finnish author Tove Jansson. Unlike all the other books, which are novels, it is a collection of short stories, and is the longest book in the series. It was first published in 1962 (second edition 1998). The book provided materials for the 1990 TV series.

The book won the 1963 Stockholms-Tidningen prize for Finland-Swedish culture. Critics have commented that while the book is for children, it is also suitable for adults. Justifying the award of the prize, Per Olof Sundman stated that the stories were deceptive and poetically gentle.

== Synopsis ==
The book contains nine stories:

- "The Spring Tune" (Vårvisan) is a dialogue between Snufkin and a small creepy-crawly, playing on the differences between the very private Snufkin and more open people like Moomintroll.
- "A Tale of Horror" (En hemsk historia) is about Whomper who tells fantastic tales; his parents believe him at first until they see that his little brother has not been eaten up by a slime snake.
- " The Fillyjonk Who Believed in Disasters" (Filifjonkan som trodde på katastrofer) is about a Fillyjonk who is not happy in her own house, and feels that a disaster is coming. When her only friend comes to visit, Fillyjonk does her best not to talk about it, to no avail. As she had expected, a great storm strikes in the night and her house is blown away in a tornado. Realising that everything that made her unhappy is gone, she feels happy and free: to her friend's surprise.
- "The Last Dragon in the World" (Historien om den sista draken i världen) tells how Moomintroll finds a baby dragon. He brings it home in a glass jar, which he puts on his desk, and discovers that it likes to eat flies. He gets cross when Little My wants to know what it was that he brought home. He decides to show it to Snufkin first. Snufkin is the only person the dragon likes, which makes Moomintroll sad. Moomintroll decides to let it go, and it flies straight to Snufkin who is out fishing. A young hemulen comes by in a boat; Snufkin gives him five fish in return for taking it somewhere nice with plenty of flies. Snufkin lets Moomintroll think the dragon just flew off, and peace returns.
- "The Hemulen Who Loved Silence" (Hemulen som älskade tystnad) tells of a Hemulen who is fed up with his job clipping tickets at an amusement park; he looks forward to retiring when he will be able to build a large, silent doll's house. One day a rainstorm washes away the amusement park. The other hemulens decide to make the place into an ice rink and offer him his old job back; they laugh when he tells them his dream. He moves into his grandmother's overgrown park, which he inherits. Children who used to visit the amusement park come to visit, carrying bits of the old carousels and houses with them. Hemulen somewhat dutifully tries to rebuild it. When the children join in and start building, it becomes a new amusement park, where they can play on condition they are absolutely silent.
- "The Invisible Child" (Berättelsen om det osynliga barnet), the title story, is about a little girl who thinks so badly of herself that she becomes invisible. Moominmamma's love and care gradually restore her to visibility.
- "The Secret of the Hattifatteners" (Hatifnattarnas hemlighet) tells how Moominpappa suddenly leaves Moominvalley to go on an adventure. He comes across the Hattifatteners and goes with them to their lonely island.
- "Cedric" (Cedric) tells of how Sniff sells his beloved dog, and is struck by a huge feeling of regret.
- "The Fir Tree" (Granen) sees Moomintroll wake from hibernation to find the rest of Moominvalley running about getting ready for Christmas. Since he has never celebrated Christmas before, he thinks something terrible is happening.

The book is illustrated with drawings by Jansson.

== Reception ==
Tales from Moominvalley is certainly a Moomin book, but when it appeared, its reviewers including Gudrun Mörne, Bo Carpelan, and Lars Bäckström at once asked whether it was intended for children or for adults. Justifying the award of the 1963 Stockholms-Tidningen prize, Per Olof Sundman stated that the book was definitely for children, but added that "in all their deceptiveness, their poetic gentleness, [and] their bizarre and sometimes slightly macabre fancies" they were also suitable for adults. The scholar of children's literature Boel Westin comments that this illustrates "Tove's camouflage thinking".

Kirkus Reviews compared Moominvalley to the writing of Lewis Carroll, highlighting how Jansson "takes up into a fantasia world with near-real inhabitants". In addition to describing the joys of the written text, Kirkus Reviews writes that the book's "creatures are given additional substance by the illustrations".

== Awards ==
The book won the 1963 Stockholms-Tidningen prize for Finland-Swedish culture.

In 1964, Jansson was awarded Finland's Anni Swan Medal for the collection.

== Adaptations ==
Along with other Moomins books, the stories and characters from Tales from Moominvalley were adapted into a Dutch-Japanese-Finnish anime television series produced by Telecable Benelux B.V. and animated by Telescreen Japan in the 1990s.

In 1992, a Finnish postage stamp based on Jansson's illustrations for the book was issued.

== Sources ==
- Westin, Boel (2014). Tove Jansson Life, Art, Words: The Authorised Biography. Translated by Mazzarella, Silvester. Sort of Books. ISBN 978-1-908745-45-3.
