= Comet in Moominland =

1946 children's book by Tove Jansson

- First edition
- Author: Tove Jansson
- Original title: Kometjakten
- Translator: Thomas Warburton
- Illustrator: Tove Jansson
- Cover artist: Tove Jansson
- Language: Swedish
- Series: Moomins
- Genre: Children's novel
- Publication date: 1946
- Publication place: Finland
- English publication date: 1951
- Pages: 157
- ISBN: 0-14-030286-7 (English)
- OCLC: 16589991
- Preceded by: The Moomins and the Great Flood
- Followed by: Finn Family Moomintroll

Comet in Moominland (Swedish: Kometjakten / Mumintrollet på kometjakt / Kometen kommer, literally 'The Comet Hunt', 'The Moomintroll Hunting Comets', 'The Comet is Coming') is the second in Finnish author Tove Jansson's series of Moomin books. Published in 1946, it marks the first appearance of several main characters, such as Snufkin and the Snork Maiden.

The English translation, published in 1951, is a translation of the first version of Jansson's book, which she later revised. The revised version was published in 1968. It contains a number of differences; for instance, the Silk Monkey character is changed to a kitten.

== Plot ==
The story begins a few weeks after the events of The Moomins and the Great Flood, as the Moomin family are settling into their new life in Moominvalley. Sniff, who is now living with the Moomins, discovers a mysterious path in a nearby forest. As he and Moomintroll explore it, they meet the mischievous Silk Monkey and arrive at a beach, where Moomintroll goes pearl-fishing. Meanwhile, Sniff and the Silk Monkey find a cave, and the three decide to hide Moomintroll's pearls there.

The next day, as they go back to the cave, they find the pearls arranged in the shape of a star with a tail. Back at Moominhouse, the Muskrat, a philosopher whose home was ruined by Moominpappa's bridge-building and who is now staying with them, explains that the pearls depict a comet. He directs Moomintroll to the Observatory on the Lonely Mountains, where the Professors would be able to tell him whether the comet will hit the Earth.

Moomintroll and Sniff set sail towards the Lonely Mountains, and on the way they meet Snufkin, who joins them. The river takes them into a cave under the mountains where they almost fall into a hole, but at the last moment a Hemulen inadvertently rescues them when he mistakes Snufkin's harmonica-playing for a rare caterpillar and reaches his butterfly net into the cave to catch it. They find themselves in the Lonely Mountains and set off towards the Observatory. On the way they are attacked by an eagle and Moomintroll finds a gold ring, which Snufkin tells him belongs to the Snork Maiden he had met a few months earlier.

At the Observatory, one of the professors tells them that the comet is going to hit the Earth, and gives them the exact date and time that it's going to happen. Realising they only have a few days left, they hurry back towards Moominvalley, noticing that the heat from the comet's approach is starting to dry up smaller streams. In a forest they come across the Snork Maiden being attacked by a poisonous bush. Moomintroll saves her, and she and her brother join them. Further on, they arrive at the sea to find it all dried up. They use stilts to cross it, and the Snork Maiden saves Moomintroll from a giant octopus.

On the other side of the sea they meet another Hemulen, and manage to survive a tornado by using his dress as a glider. Finally they arrive in Moominvalley and the whole family, together with the Hemulen, the Muskrat and the Snorks, go to the cave, making it there just in time to seek shelter from the comet. Believing the impact to have destroyed everything, they fall asleep, only to discover the next morning, to their great delight, that the comet had missed the Earth altogether and everything is back the way it used to be.

== Other versions ==
Jansson wrote and illustrated a black-and-white comic strip version for newspapers. The 86-day story does not follow the book's plot; for example, the Moomins get their news from a radio, not a trip to the observatory, and Little My appears throughout the story, albeit often observing. In this version the comet hits Moominvalley at the same time as a massive flood, and the effects of the two cancel each other out.

The novel has been adapted into animation several times, including the 1978 series Mumi-troll, the 1992 feature Tanoshii Mūmin Ikka: Mūmindani no Suisei, and 12 episodes of the stop-motion animated 1977–1982 Polish TV series, The Moomins (the storyline of which was based on Jansson's preferred 1968 revision of the novel, which had also been the basis of its Polish translation). The episodes of the stop-motion series were remastered, re-recorded with a full voice cast, and edited into the 2010 compilation movie Moomins and the Comet Chase.

== Analysis ==
Some critics have considered the comet an allegory of nuclear weapons, especially in later revisions, while more general fear of war and occupation may have been a major influence on Jansson's text, written in early summer 1945 before the use of the atomic bombs on Hiroshima and Nagasaki.
