= Little My =

- Moomins character
- Little My as she appears in the Moomin books
- First appearance: The Exploits of Moominpappa (1950)
- Created by: Tove Jansson

In-universe information
- Gender: Female
- Family: Moominpappa (adopted father); Moominmamma (adopted mother); Moomintroll (adopted brother); Sniff (adopted brother)
- Relatives: Mymble (mother); Unknown father Mymble's Daughter (sister); Joxter (step-father); Snufkin (half-brother) and numerous other brothers and sisters

Little My (original Swedish: Lilla My, literally: "Little Mu") is a character in the Moomin series of books by Swedish-speaking Finnish writer Tove Jansson. The character first appeared in the fourth book, The Exploits of Moominpappa (1950). She is a small, determined, and fiercely independent Mymble. Little My is brash, aggressive, mischievous, and disrespectful, but can also be a good friend when she wants to. She is the Mymble's daughter's younger sister. She was eventually adopted by the Moomin family.

Her name originated from the twelfth letter of the Greek alphabet: μ (mu), (Note: In the metric system, lowercase μ, meaning "one-millionth", represents the prefix micro-, from the Greek μικρός (mikrós), meaning "small".) – transliterated as my and pronounced [ˈmyː] in Swedish.

== Personality ==
Little My is an abrasive girl who almost always succeeds in persuading her listener or discussion partner. She is an unconventional debater who uses emotion and logic to win arguments. She typically makes a personal attack on the person she is having the discussion with or about, states her own undocumented conclusions, exaggerates her opponents' arguments to ridicule them, and uses nonverbal effects to show her opponent's inferiority.

== Appearances ==
Little My appears in the following books:

- The Exploits of Moominpappa (Book 4) – Little My is born on a Midsummer's Day during Moominpappa's youth, and is referred to as the smallest and youngest of all the Mymble's children; so small, in fact that you can hardly even see her. She doesn't play a very large part in the book, but does on occasion display her fondness for mischief and cheerfully morbid fascination for disaster and destruction.
- Moominsummer Madness (Book 5) – In the fifth book, Little My has grown enough to take a more active part in the plot, though she is still small enough that Snufkin can carry her in his pocket. She is now in the care of her older sister, The Mymble's daughter, who tries unsuccessfully to teach her good behavior, but is separated from the others during the course of the plot and ends up being rescued by Snufkin, whom she accompanies for most of the rest of the book as he battles a rule-obsessed Park Keeper and ends up unwittingly "rescuing" a group of other children as well.
- Moominland Midwinter (Book 6) – Little My is the only character, apart from Moomintroll, who wakes from hibernation and gets to experience winter for the first time. Unlike him, she immediately finds this "new, ice-cold world" to be great fun, especially after she discovers winter sports.
- Tales from Moominvalley (Book 7) – This book consists of several short stories, three of which feature Little My: "A Tale of Horror", in which she tells tall tales of terror and doom to the Next-to-youngest-Whomper; "The Last Dragon on Earth", in which she basically plays the nosy, sarcastic, and insensitive younger sibling to Moomintroll (though actually being older than him); and "The Invisible Child", in which she demonstrates her own ideas about how to help the invisible Ninny become visible again.
- Moominpappa at Sea (Book 8) – Little My accompanies the Moomin family to the lighthouse island and is a constant presence in the book. Again, she is the only character who instantly takes to the new life and remains cheerful throughout.

In addition, Little My plays major roles in the picture-books The Book about Moomin, Mymble and Little My and An Unwanted Guest, has a brief speaking role in The Dangerous Journey, and makes a silent (and unmentioned by the narrative) cameo in one of the illustrations in Who Will Comfort Toffle?. She is also mentioned a number of times in Moominvalley in November, but she doesn't actually appear in person.

She is a major character in several Moomin-related media, comics, movies, and TV series.
