= Atos Wirtanen =

Finnish politician (1906–1979)

Atos Kasimir Wirtanen
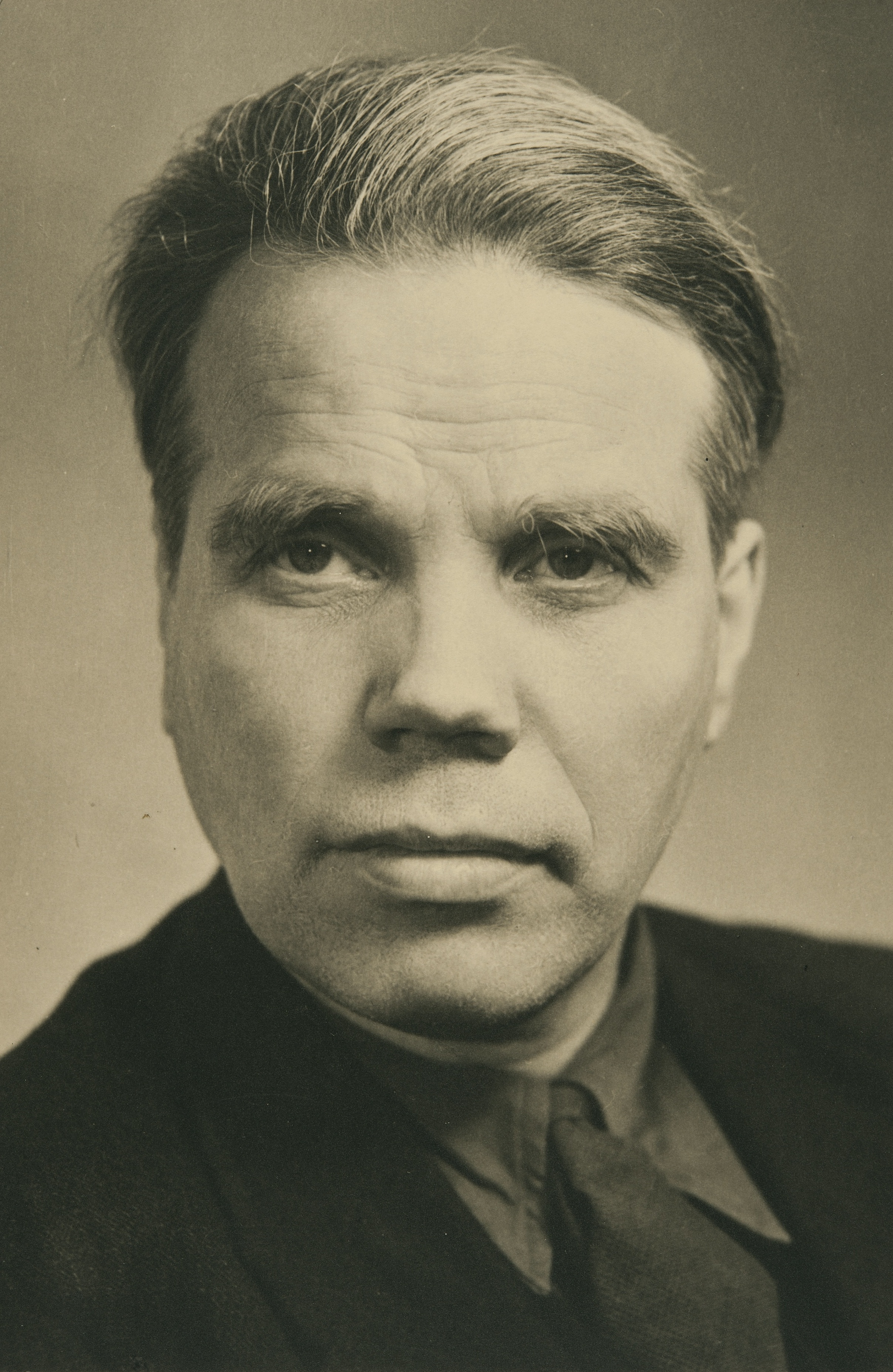

Member of the Finland Parliament for Uusimaa
- In office 9 January 1938 – 28 March 1954

Personal details
- Born: 27 January 1906 Saltvik, Åland
- Died: 10 March 1979 (aged 73) Helsinki
- Party: Social Democratic Party of Finland
- Other political affiliations: Finnish People's Democratic League, Socialist Unity Party (Finland)
- Spouse(s): Maj-Lis von Wachenfeldt , (m. 1942–1943) Irja Hagfors (m. 1954)

Atos Kasimir Wirtanen (27 January 1906 in Saltvik – 10 March 1979) was a Finnish left-wing intellectual, journalist, member of Finnish parliament (1936–1953) and cultural critic.

== Life ==
Wirtanen was born in Saltvik, Åland. He was one of nine children of Karl Robert Wirtanen (b. 1869), a farmer, and Eva Amanda Lundelin (b. 1874).

Wirtanen entered parliament on the Social Democratic Party of Finland (SDP) list at the 1936 election. An opponent of fascism, in 1938 in response to the events of Kristallnacht, he likened Nazism's antisemitism with the Finnish far-right's hatred of the Swedish-speaking population of Finland. During the Continuation War, he was among the signatories of the "Petition of the Thirty-Three", members of the peace opposition who sought peace with the Soviet Union, his actions forcing him to spend a period underground.

Following the war, he joined to the Finnish People's Democratic League (SKDL) in 1946. Wirtanen was also active in the Socialist Unity Party (SYP) and served as its chairman from 1948 to 1955. In 1955 he led the SYP out of the SKDL. Wirtanen was fired twice (1941 and 1947) from the publication Arbetarbladet and once (1953) from the magazine Ny Tid.

== Personal life ==
Wirtanen was married to the writer Maj-Lis von Wachenfeldt from 1942 to 1943. In the 1940s he was a close friend and lover of the author Tove Jansson and a model for the Snufkin character, whose green hat is borrowed from Wirtanen. The first Moomin comic strips were published in October 1947 in Ny Tid. The series had to stop earlier than planned, as readers criticized it and especially the Moominpappa character for his bourgeois sympathies.

In 1954, he married Irja Hagfors, dancer, choreographer and dance teacher. He died in Helsinki in 1979.

== Works ==
Wirtanen published two memoirs: Mot mörka makter (Against Dark Forces) and Poliittiset muistelmat (Political Memoirs). He also published several collections of aphorisms and other literary works.
