= Irja Hagfors =

Finnish dancer and choreographer

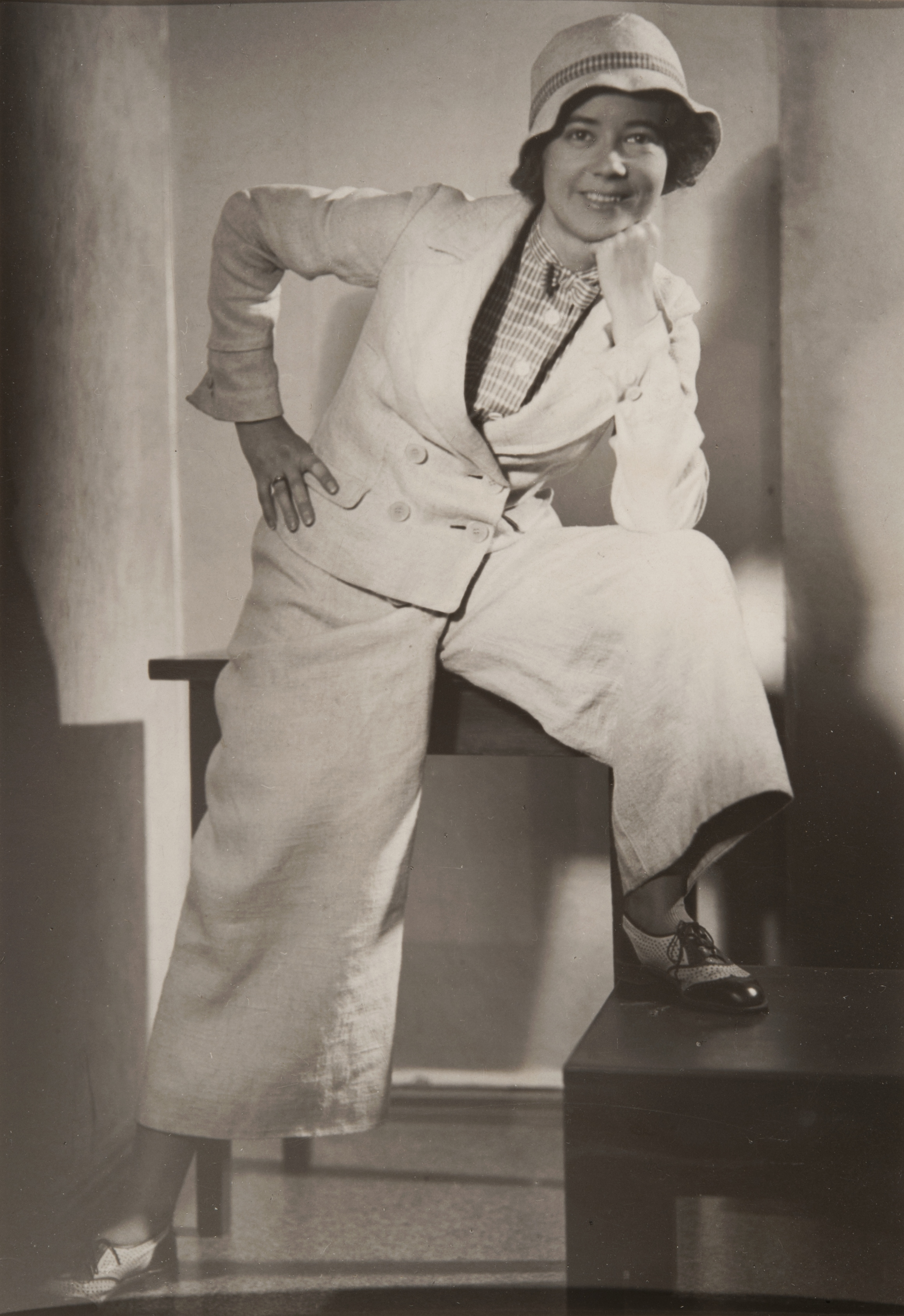
Irja Hagfors in the early 1930s.

Irja Margareta Hagfors (November 4, 1905 – February 28, 1988) was a Finnish dance artist, choreographer and dance teacher who was born and died in Helsinki.

== Biography ==
Hagfors initially studied dance in Finland, at the Gripenberg School and Salminen-Naparstok School. In 1926 she began her studies in Hellerau Laxemburg-school of dance in Laxenburg, near Vienna. She received a diploma in dance from there in 1928.

She returned to Finland in 1928 and was a dance teacher in the autumn of action at Helvi Salminen's dance school. The November of that year was her first public dance performance in Finland. The following year, Hagfors went to Finland and worked for the next few years in many different theatrical and dance groups in Central Europe, including Berlin and Zurich. She was also known by her work in the Harald Kreutzberg and Trudi Schoopin dance groups. After the Second World War broke out she returned to Finland and then worked as a choreographer, dance teacher and dance critic.

Hagfors was one of the pioneers of modern dance and a great defender of Finland. She participated actively in the new dance interpretation of the public polemic, achieving this most prominently in the Tulenkantajat, in the 5th to 10th editions of the journal in 1929, together with Antti Halonen and Raoul af Hällström. Hagfors readily acknowledged that a new dance (freedom of dance, dance of expression) is not fitted in the molds of classical ballet in that it is better technically than artistically. But unlike her opponents, she was able to clearly see the potential for a new dance classical ballet a deeper and more diverse expression. In a newspaper editorial, Tulenkantajat stated its admiration for her speech in this debate, in which Hagfors had shown in that her own work made her claims valid, so she could come out of this important cultural debate as a clear winner.

Hagfors studied for a few years in Central Europe in the Rudolf von Laban movement analysis and the German dance theatre. These arrived to Finland and became more widely known only in 1960 and 1970s, mainly thanks to Marjo Kuusela. Hagfors made a significant cultural act when she translated Bertolt Brecht's book on theater theory into Finnish (1954).

Hagfors' father, Dr. Edwin Hagfors, was a teacher and translator from Helsinki, and her mother, Ulla Charlotta Marchander, was from Sweden. Hagfors also had an older sister, Aino Elisabet Hagfors. In 1954, Irja Hagfors married Atos Wirtanen, a writer and Member of Parliament, who died in 1979.

Hagfors was awarded the Pro Finlandia medal in 1969.
