= Sniff (Moomin character) =

Children's book character

- Moomin character
- Sniff as he appears in the 1990 Moomin animated television series.
- First appearance: The Moomins and the Great Flood (1945)
- Created by: Tove Jansson
- Voiced by: (Japan) Ryusei Nakao (United Kingdom) Jeff Harding (Moomin) (Sweden) Riko Eklundh (Finland) Eero Ahre (Finland) Jyrki Kovaleff (Comet in Moominland) (Finland) Jukka Nylund (2017 dubbing) (Finland) Ilpo Mikkonen (Moomins and the Comet Chase) (Denmark) Mads Mikkelsen (Moomins and the Comet Chase, international version) (United Kingdom) Warwick Davis (Moominvalley, international version)

In-universe information
- Gender: Male
- Family: Moominpappa (adopted father); Moominmamma (adopted mother); Moomintroll (adopted brother); Little My (adopted sister)
- Relatives: Muddler (father); Fuzzy (mother); Fuddler (brother); Hodgkins (granduncle); Hodgkins' Lost Brother (grandfather); The Jumble (sister-in-law); Unnamed cat (pet cat)

Sniff (Swedish: Sniff) is a character in the Moomin stories created by Swedish-speaking Finnish writer Tove Jansson. His debut is in the first Moomin-book The Moomins and the Great Flood. In addition to books, he is also a prominent character in the Moomin comics and animations.

== Sniff in Moomin stories ==
The parents of Sniff are The Muddler (Rådd-djuret) and Fuzzy (Sås-djuret), childhood friends of Moominpappa. Sniff is considered as a sort of an adopted child of the Moomin family, as Muddler and Fuzzy lost him when he was a small child.

Sniff is greedy and a bit of a coward. He is cowardly and timid, so freedom for him means conquering his fears. Agneta Rehal-Johansson considers Sniff a study in the psychology of a small child. She has argued there's an initial sort of sibling rivalry between Sniff and Moomintroll in Comet in Moominland: Sniff, the smaller creature, envies Moomintroll, who has strengths and characteristics Sniff would want himself. Towards the end of the book, Sniff has found a place in the Moomin family.

When Comet in Moominland, originally published in 1946, was revised in 1968, Sniff's role changed and grew more prominent, with Sniff becoming the main protagonist of a secondary plot in the book. His personality changed, too. Tove Jansson's own early notes describes him as "cowardly, egoistic, puberty", (Note: In the original Swedish: "feg, egoistisk, pubertet") but from being self-absorbed, ostentatious and acquisitive, he becomes anxious, wanting to be heard and seen, whining and impatient, like a worried child, childishly fond of gold and pretty stones. His manner of speech changes, from arrogant and unsympathetic to pathetic.

In the original books Sniff is small in size and therefore often referred to as the "little creature Sniff". However, In the comics and for example in the animated TV series Moomin Sniff is tall and relatively large compared to many of the other characters. In the animations he is portrayed as brown or grey, but in the colour pictures made by Tove Jansson he is always white (although sometimes, when feeling ill, he turns slightly green). He has a long thin tail and his head looks much like a kangaroo's, with a long pointed muzzle with a black nose at the tip and large triangular ears that splay out from the top of his head.

In the books Sniff often spends the night in the Moominhouse, but he lives in a dwelling built into a rock outcrop near the forest. In the TV series and Tove and Lars Jansson's comics Sniff has his own house. In the TV animation he seems to spend more time in Moominhouse than in his own house. In the comics, Sniff's greed for money makes him more arrogant than in the books, and sometimes he even goes scheming with the shady Stinky.

In the book Tales from the Moominvalley Sniff has a cuddly toy dog called Cedric, which Sniff has given to Gaffsie's daughter. In the game Snufkin: Melody of Moominvalley, Snufkin saves Cedric from a huge crab and Sniff gives him a Hemulen plushie in return, which functions as a quest object later in the game.

Sniff is an active character over the whole span of the animated TV series Moomin, even though Tove Jansson used the character only occasionally after the first books. In the TV series Sniff has been added to many of Jansson's stories where he did not originally feature.

== Notes and references ==
=== References ===
- Rehal-Johansson, Karin (2006). Den lömska barnboksförfattaren : Tove Jansson och muminverkets metamorfoser (in Swedish). Makadam. ISBN 9789170610332.
