= List of Moomin characters =

Some of the many Moomin characters. From left to right, Sniff, Snufkin, Moominpappa, Moominmamma, Moomintroll (Moomin), Mymble, Groke, Snork Maiden and Hattifatteners

A large number of characters appear in the Moomin series by Swedish-speaking Finnish writer Tove Jansson. The original Swedish names are given with the etymologies and word associations suggested by Yvonne Bertills in her 2003 dissertation.

== Main characters ==
=== Moomintroll ===
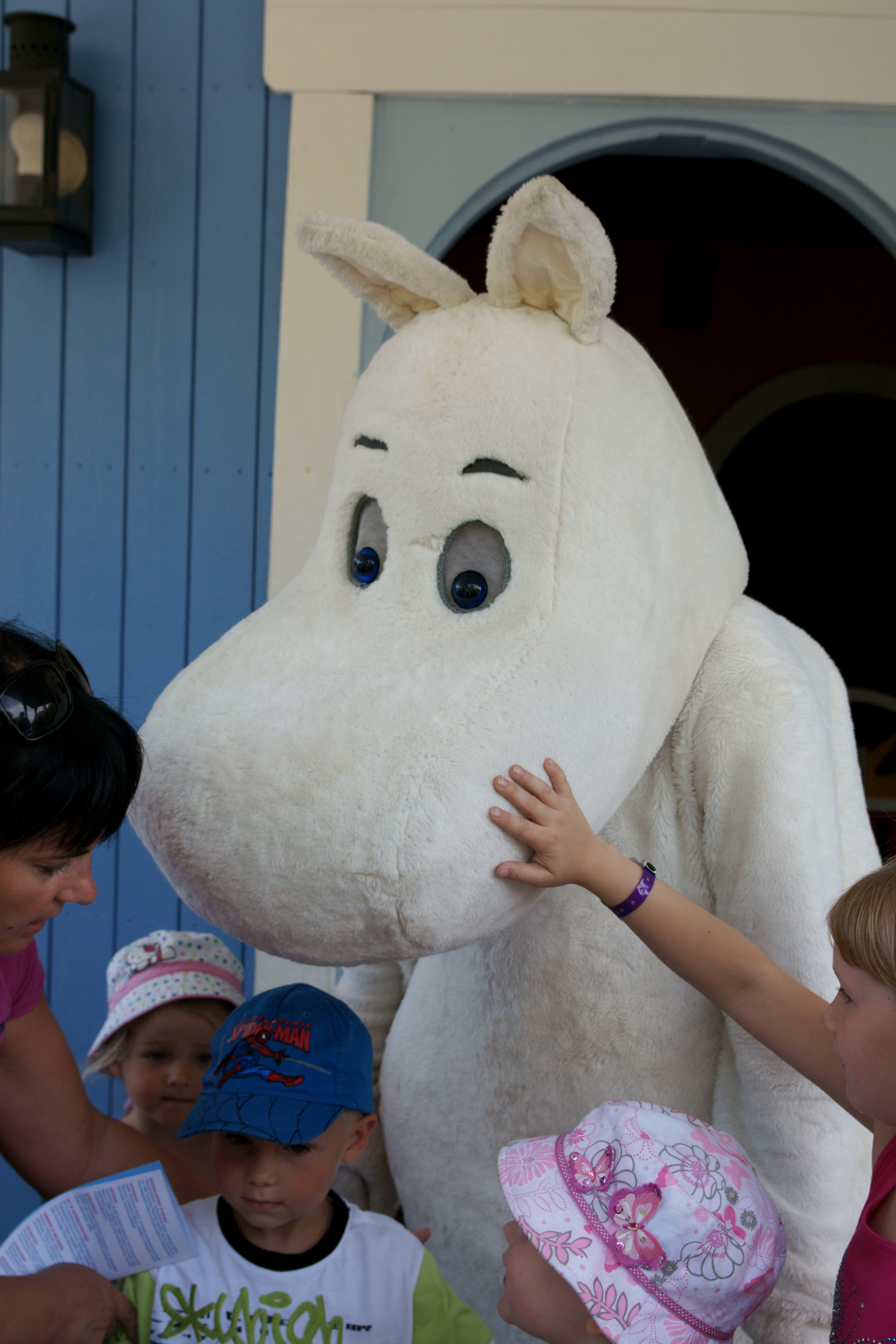
Moomintroll

Moomintroll (Swedish: Mumintrollet – invented mumin + troll, "troll"; also simply Moomin) is the protagonist of most of the books.

In the cartoon strip Moomintroll finds himself beset by endless problems. He is a "moomin" – a little white troll with a hippopotamus-like big round snout.

Moomin is very close with Snorkmaiden. They have a very sweet and romantic relationship in the early books. However, later on he and Snorkmaiden are not seen together as often, and after Moominland Midwinter Moomin refers to Snorkmaiden as a friend.

His best friend is Snufkin. Snufkin is inspired by Atos Wirtanen, Tove Jansson’s close friend and at one point, fiancé. Moomintroll is also an author avatar for Jansson, meaning the two characters were based on real-life lovers. Because of this real-life parallel, their relationship is sometimes examined in the context of queer theory.

Moomintroll was initially called "snork". Jansson described him as her alter ego. The character has a mostly positive reception from critics.

The asteroid 58345 Moomintroll was named in his honor.

=== Moominmamma ===
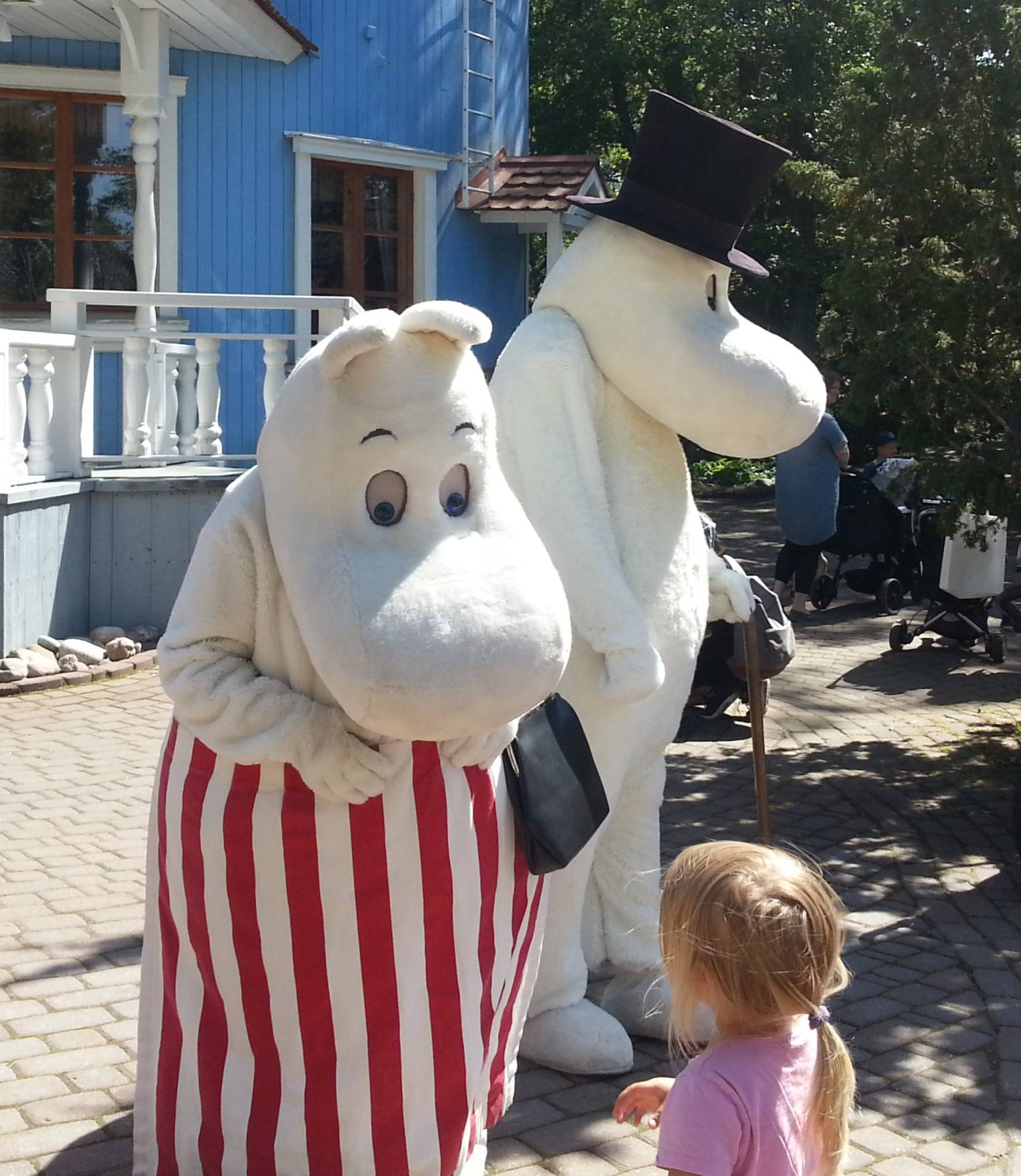
Moominmamma and Moominpappa

Moominmamma (Swedish: Muminmamman) – the mother of Moomintroll. She is very nurturing and calm. She is almost never without her handbag, which contains essentials like woolly socks, tummy powder, and bark. She makes bark boats every summer, and the first one goes to her favorite.

=== Moominpappa ===
Moominpappa (Swedish: Muminpappan) – orphaned in his younger years, he is a somewhat restless soul who left the orphanage to venture out into the world in his youth, but has now settled down. His eagerness to try new things often sets a story in motion. He usually wears a black top-hat. In the 1990s animation Moominpappa writes his memoir.

=== Snorkmaiden ===
(Swedish: Snorkfröken – snorkig, "snooty, snotty"; fröken, "Miss") – Moomintroll's fair lady friend and admirer. She does fall in love with others sometimes, but returns to Moomintroll before things get too serious. She has blonde hair and sports a golden anklet. She changes color according to her mood, with her baseline color in the books described as pale yellow. Snorks are almost identical to Moomins except that Snorks come in different colors (Moomins are white), have hair on their heads, and their fur changes color depending on their mood. However in the 1990s animation, she and her brother are always the same color. Snorkmaiden is known as Fraulein in the Japanese dub of the 1990s animated series.

=== Snufkin ===
Snufkin cosplay at KodachiCon 2026

(Swedish: Snusmumriken – dialectical snusmumrik or mumrik, "old man who talks carelessly; old codger, old bore; old snuff-taker; snotty or scruffy old man," derived from snus, "snuff, chewing tobacco" + interjection mum, also in mumla "mumble," with pejorative ending -ik) – Moomintroll's best friend, the son of the elder Mymble and the Joxter, and half-brother to the Mymble's daughter and Little My. Snufkin wears old green clothes and a wide-brimmed hat that he has had since birth. He lives in a tent, smokes a pipe, and plays the harmonica. He is based on Tove Jansson's ex-fiancé Atos Wirtanen who was also known to wander.

He lives a nomadic lifestyle, only staying in Moominvalley in the spring and summer, but leaving for warmer climates down south every winter instead of hibernating through the winter as the others of Moominvalley do.

The character has a mostly positive reception from both fans and critics.

=== Little My ===
(Swedish: Lilla My – my, "micron, mu") is a small, determined, and fiercely independent Mymble. When she wants something done, she does it straight away. She is very aggressive and totally disrespectful, but can be a good friend. She is Snufkin's sister and first appeared in The Exploits of Moominpappa, in which her small stature is explained as resulting from arrest of growth. Little My's age and relation to the Joxter and Snufkin has notable contradiction, mainly between Moominpappa's Memoirs and Moominsummer Madness.

== Supporting characters ==
=== Alicia ===
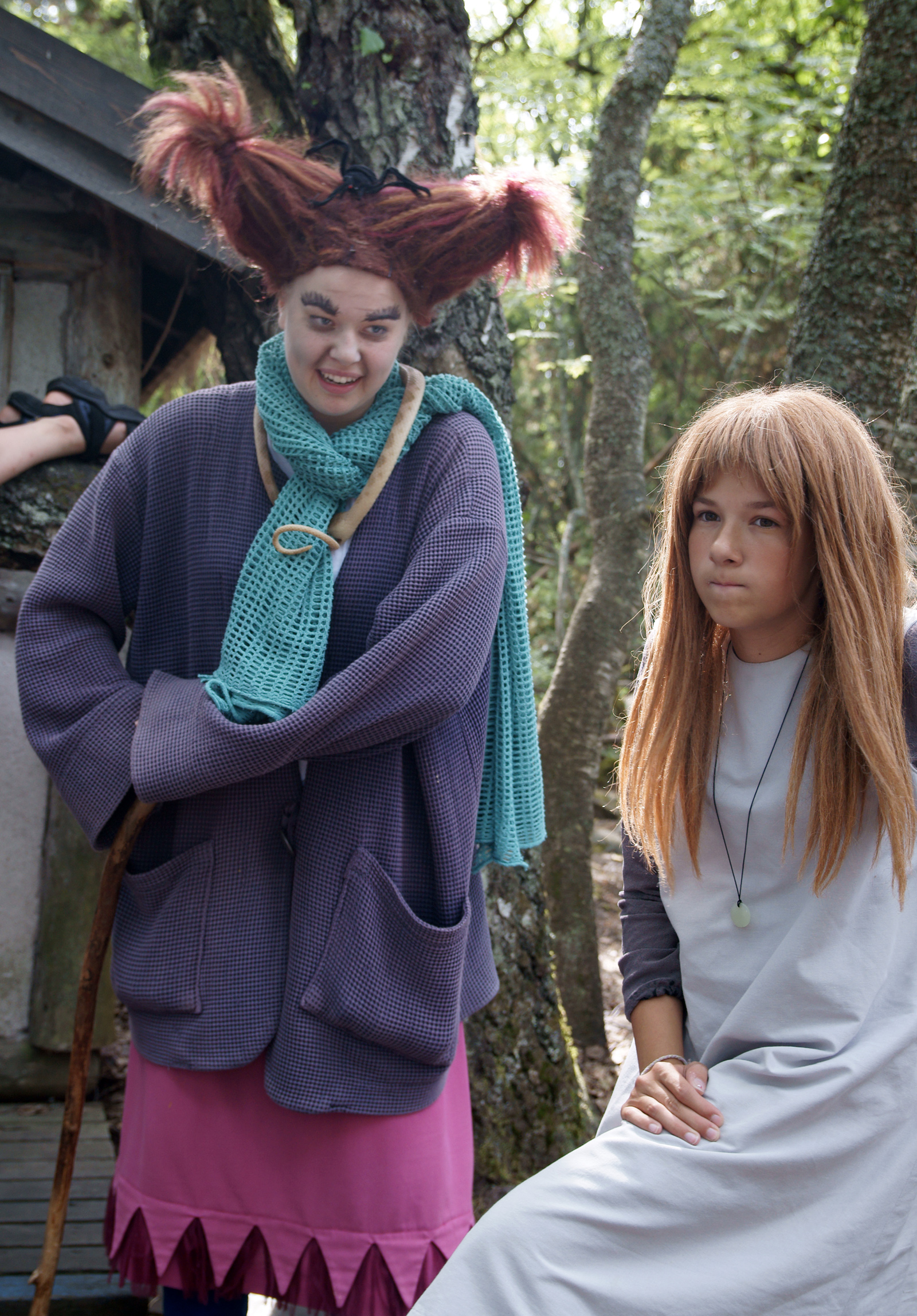
The Witch and Alicia in Moomin World theme park, Naantali, Finland

(Swedish: Alissa) – Alice, the Witch's granddaughter. Like the Witch, she first appeared in the animated 1990 series and does not appear in the original stories or comic strips. She likes the Moomins and plays with them on the sly whenever the Witch is otherwise occupied. She is a witch-in-training herself, and develops several magic skills during the series, most notably walking on water, underwater-breathing, and running at lightning speed.

=== The Ancestor ===
(Swedish: Förfadern) – the Moomintrolls are descended from small, shaggy trolls living in tiled stoves. One of those is still dwelling in the Moomin family's bathing house cupboard and stove. He is called the Ancestor and makes appearances in Moominland Midwinter and Moominvalley in November.

=== The Antlion ===
(Swedish: Myrlejonet) – in the Moomins universe, antlions are big, burrowing lion-like animals with slender bodies and big claws. In The Moomins and the Great Flood, Moominmama encounters a territorial antlion that sprays sand in her eyes and then tries to drag her down into his den. In Finn Family Moomintroll, Moomintroll and Snork use the hobgoblins hat to turn the antlion into a hedgehog.

=== Audrey Glamour ===
Minor character from the comic Moomin on the Riviera.

=== Aunt Jane ===
Aunt Jane (in Finnish Jenni-täti) is the rich and cranky sister of Moominpappa's mother who appeared in the comic Moomin and Family Life. She is also featured in Episode 27 of the animated 1990 series.

=== Captain Rum-Pot ===
A pirate who appears in the 1990 series.

=== Daddy Jones ===
(Swedish: Kungen/Självhärskaren, Swedish "King"/ "Self-Ruler"; i.e. "autocrat") – the Autocrat in The Exploits of Moominpappa. He owns a fairground full of surprises, sits on a throne and gives a blast on his foghorn when he makes royal proclamations.

=== Dame Elaine ===
A female ghost character living in an old manor house. She only appears in the animated 1990 series.

=== The Dweller Under the Sink ===
(Swedish: den som bor under diskbänken) – a small furry creature that lives under the sink in Moomin House. He only appears in Moominland Midwinter and becomes known to Moomintroll when he wakes up during the long winter hibernation undertaken by the whole Moominfamily. Moomintroll tries to strike up a conversation with him by complimenting on his rather bushy eyebrows, but only succeeds in upsetting him.

=== Edward the Booble ===
(Swedish: dronten Edward – dronten, "the dodo") – a dragonlike, gigantic monster (the second largest creature in the world – only his brother is larger) who pays for people's funerals if he accidentally treads on them. He is generally bad tempered because of this. He accidentally aids the launch of the Oshun Oxtra (Ocean Orchestra), a boat invented by Moominpappa's childhood friend, Hodgkins, by sitting in a river bed.

=== Emma ===
(Swedish) – the rather bitter stage-rat (teaterråtta) in Moominsummer Madness. She helps the Moomin family understand what a theater is and also collaborates with Moominpappa on his play, The Lion's Brides. Before she introduces herself, the family refers to her as Theprop (the prop) after a misunderstanding.

=== Fillyjonks ===
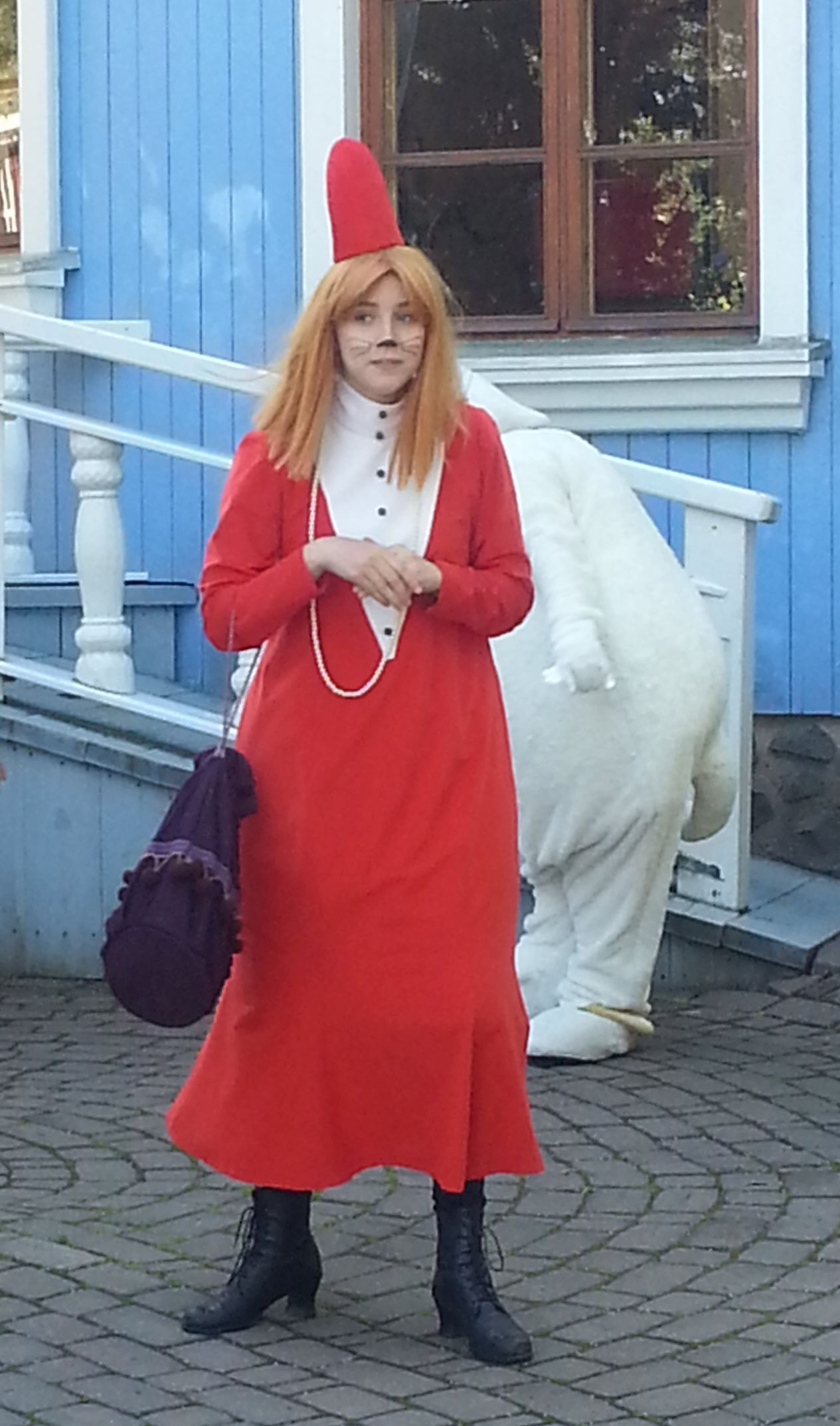
Fillyjonk depicted at Moomin World

(Swedish: Filifjonkan – no semantic meaning, but with the first element compare filibuffare "joker", filidera, "make bad noise", and with the second, fjompa/fjanta/fjolla + -an = "silly/foolish/fussy woman") The first Fillyjonks we hear of are the late theatre director in Moominsummer Madness (Emma the stage-rat is his widow) and the young Fillyjonk who joins the Snork Maiden in the late night jaunt to the wishing well. Later we meet the psychological study of the "Fillyjonk Who Believed In Disasters" (Tales from Moominvalley). Not a single moment of fantasy or joy, only duties and discipline; she is an extremely methodical person tied down with principles and has a deep rooted belief in prestige and tradition. Nevertheless, after a catastrophe, the Fillyjonk can be freed from the trammels of social expectation and can discover the joys of freedom, irrationality and self-expression. Deep inside she has had a wish to live freely as the Moomin family does, without any worries. Fillyjonks resemble humanoid rodents; they are tall and thin, with long muzzles and raccoon-like rings around their eyes.

=== Fuzzy ===
(Swedish: Sås-djuret – såsa, "to linger; to loiter" + djur, "animal") – Sniff's mother. Married to Muddler.

=== Gaffsie ===
(Swedish: Gafsan – gafsa, "chatter; tittle-tattle") – not much is known about Gaffsie, except that she is a friend of Fillyjonk. She appears most prominently in The Book about Moomin, Mymble and Little My as well as in Tales from Moominvalley in the stories "The Fillyjonk who Believed in Disasters" and "The Fir Tree". She is also mentioned in Moominvalley in November.

=== Grandpa Grumble ===
(Swedish: Onkelskruttet – onkel, "uncle," also used in the meaning "grandfather"; for the second element, see under Miffle) – an old man who appears in Moominvalley in November. He is quite old and somewhat senile. He uses a cane and owns many pairs of glasses that he carries with him in a basket.

=== The Groke ===
(Swedish: Mårran – morra "to growl; to grumble", Finnish: Mörkö – "[The] Bogey") – cold and ghost-like, anything she touches will freeze. She initially causes fear, everyone thinking that she is coming to freeze them, but in reality she is just very sad and lonely as she is just seeking friendship and warmth, but is declined by everyone and everything. Her most prominent appearances are in Finn Family Moomintroll, Moominland Midwinter and Moominpappa at Sea.

=== Hattifatteners ===
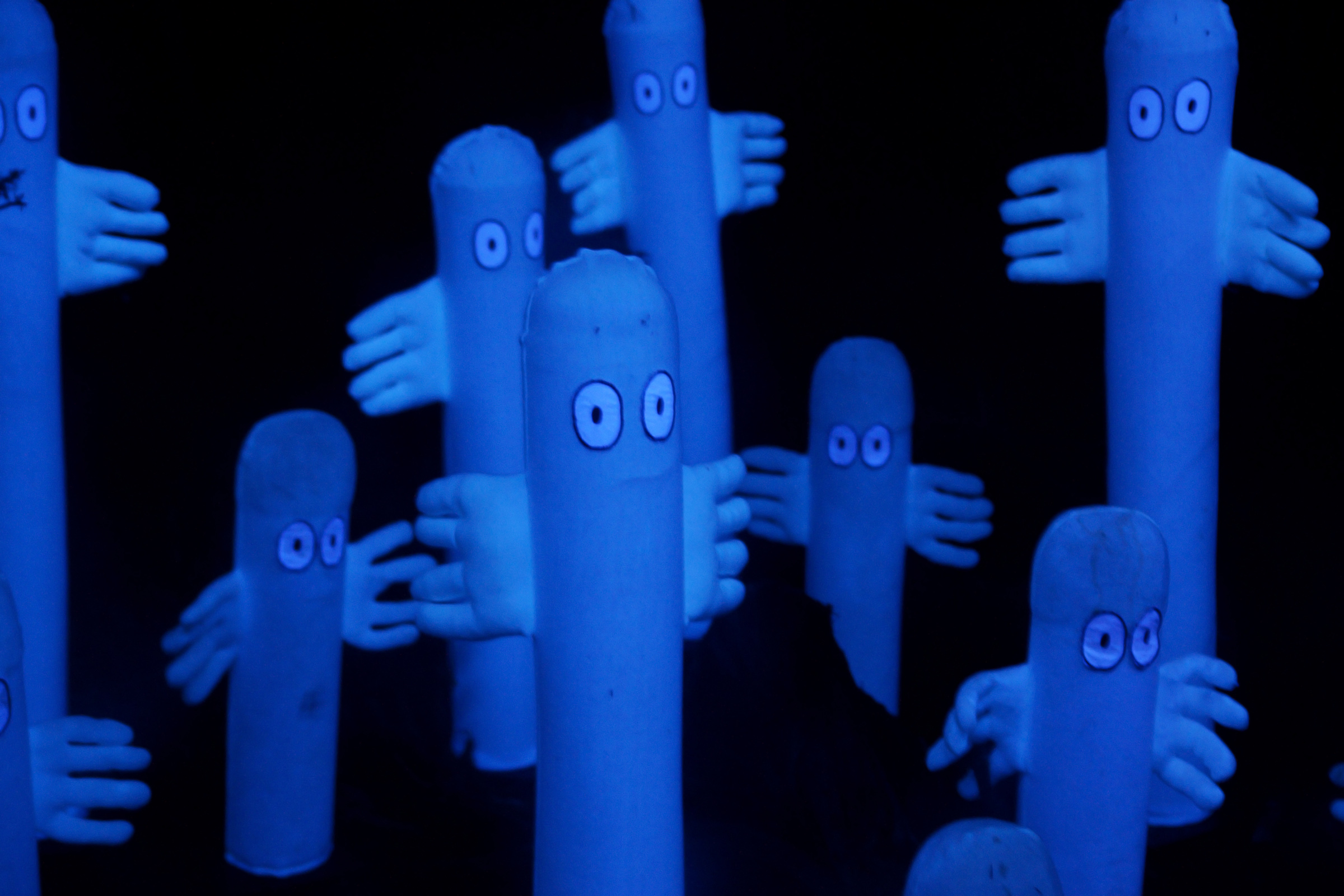
Hattifatteners depicted at Moomin World

(Swedish: hattifnattar – with the first element compare hatta, "dither"; the second element is related to fnatta (omkring), "flutter around"; få fnatt, "go crazy or get excited over something"; poss. fnatt, "squirrel") – small white ghost-like creatures that resemble worn socks. Hattifatteners are always on the move and travel the sea in large groups (but always in odd numbers), such as boat convoys. They meet every year on a lonely island. Their only goal in life is to reach the horizon. They may communicate using telepathy. The Hattifatteners cannot see very well, but their sense of touch is very strong, and they can feel ground vibrations and electricity. Hattifatteners assemble once a year when they "recharge" in a thunderstorm, when they can cause electrical burns. Hattifatteners grow from seeds, but only if this seed is sown on Midsummer Eve.

=== Hemulens ===
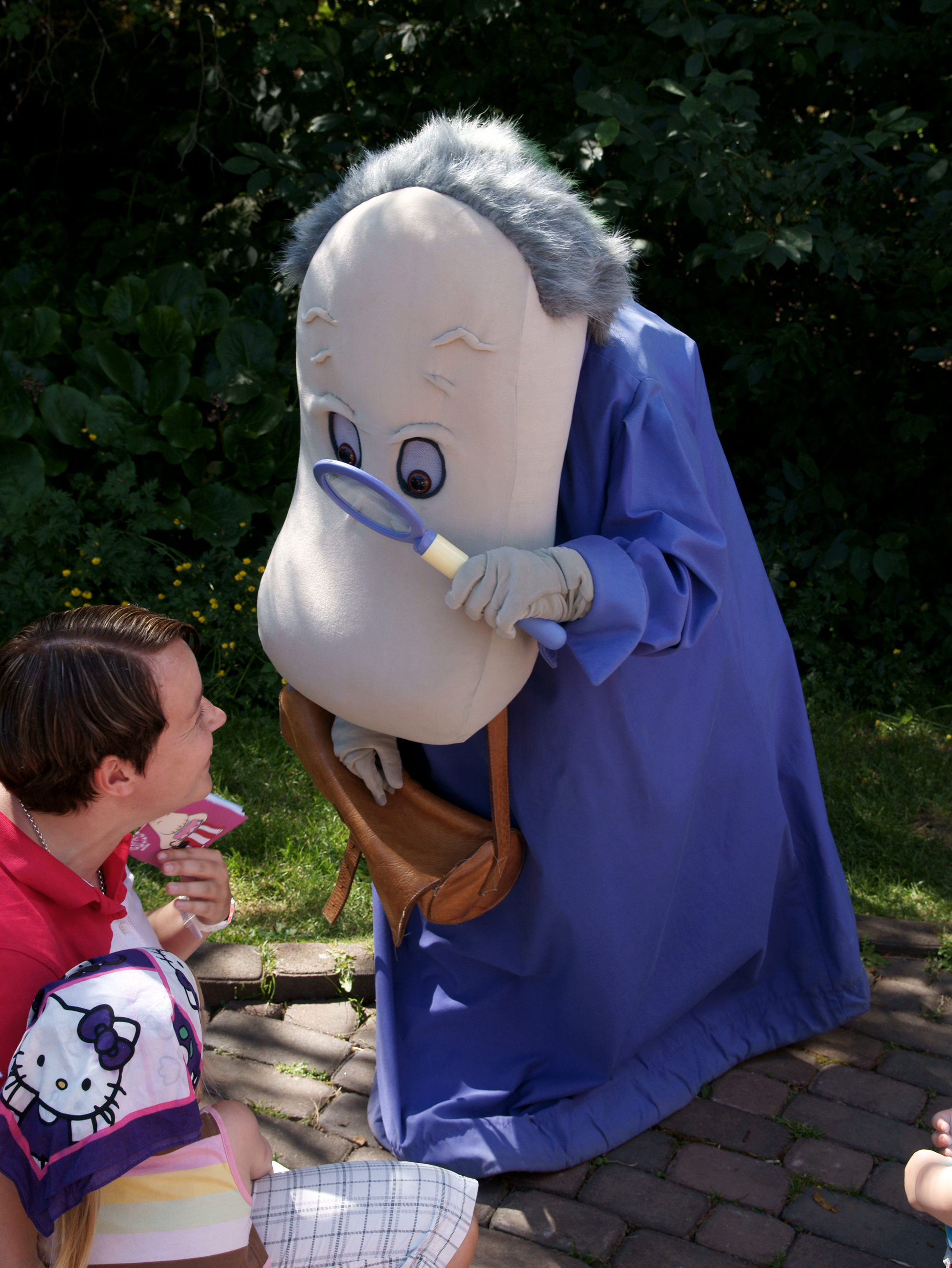
Hemulen depicted at Moomin World

(Swedish: Hemul – hemul, a legal term, "authority or warrant for something (n.), entitled (adj.)", cf. also adjective ohemul "un-hemul"; "improper, unreasonable") (In Swedish "Hemulen" means "the hemul") – Hemulens feature frequently in the books. One of them is an avid stamp collector, and another is an avid skier. In Finn Family Moomintroll, "un-Hemulenish" (ohemul) contains a sense of "unwarranted, unjustified". Other characters frequently find the Hemulens annoying or overwhelming, as they can be somewhat loud, bossy, abrasive and insensitive, but they are well-intentioned and usually have other redeeming qualities.

Hemulens first appear in Comet in Moominland, featuring one who collect insects and another collecting stamps. The stamp collecting hemulen reappears in the beginning of Finn Family Moomintroll in which he is depressed, as he has every stamp on the face of earth and has lost his purpose in life. Later on, he finds a new purpose: to collect plants.

A female Hemulen raised Moominpappa in an orphanage, and later Moominpappa met her aunt, who looked confusingly like her.

=== The Hobgoblin ===
(Swedish: Trollkarlen – "The Wizard") – appearing in Finn Family Moomintroll (Swedish: Trollkarlens hatt), he is a powerful magician who travels the Universe with his flying panther, looking for the King's Ruby. His top hat is found in the Lonely Mountains by Moomintroll, Snufkin and Sniff, who take it back to Moominhouse. Chaos ensues, as anything you put inside the hat is transformed. Moomintroll himself is changed into an ugly tarsier-like monster by the hat when he uses it to hide in during a game. The hat also changes the Moominhouse into a sort of jungle. The Hobgoblin has a quite intimidating appearance, but is friendly.

=== Hodgkins ===
(Swedish: Fredriksson – "Frederickson", a common family name) – an inventor and childhood friend of Moominpappa (The Exploits of Moominpappa). He is Muddler's uncle and thus Sniff's great-uncle. He builds the Oshun Oxtra (misspelling of Ocean Orchestra in English, known as Haffsårkestern in Swedish), a boat in which Moominpappa and his friends travel on their adventures.

=== The Island Ghost ===
(Swedish: Spöket – "The Ghost") – a spectre that haunts the Island colonised by Moominpappa in The Exploits of Moominpappa. He is not very good at haunting and gets annoyed when the colonists laugh at him. He takes up knitting to soothe his nerves.

=== Joxter ===
(Swedish: Joxaren, Swedish verb joxa "fiddle, tinker") – The Joxter is Moominpappa's old friend and father of Snufkin. He is described as worry-free and so lazy that he described his perfect life as: “sitting in a fruit tree, eating fruit as it grows”. He appears beige in colour and has water-clear eyes. He has forebodings throughout the book telling his friends of danger. Joxter also shares his son’s dislike of authority figures stating that their family was at war with a park keeper in The Exploits of Moominpappa. Joxter is the lover of The Mymble (elder). In Moominpappa's Memoirs, he is also Little My's father, although this is contradicted in other books, such as Moominsummer Madness.

=== The Lady of the Cold ===
(Swedish: Isfrun – "The Ice-Lady") – a very creepy, beautiful lady who brings winter to Moominvalley. Looking into her eyes will freeze you, turning you into ice. She is also referred to as "The Great Cold" (Swedish: den Stora Kölden – "The Great Cold" – "The Great Frost"). She makes a brief appearance in Moominland Midwinter as she walks across the sea ice and Moomin valley.

=== Mameluke ===
The mameluke (Swedish: mameluk) is a type of large fish that first appears in Finn Family Moomintroll, in which Snork manages to catch one during a fishing trip. The mameluke is also featured in episode 62 of the 1990 animated series, in which the Witch saves Little My from being swallowed by it. It is also featured in an episode of the 2019 series, as Moominpappa exaggerates his fishing story with Moomintroll.

=== Mermaid ===
The green-haired Mermaid appears only in the animated 1990 series, in Episode 20 of Season 2.

=== Miffle ===
(Swedish: Skruttet – also as a common noun, det lilla knyttet/skruttet, "the little creep"; skrutt, a noun with "various meanings, although with one common feature, that is something small or something weak, rubbish (skräp, "garbage"), trash or core, which in turn also suggests something quite insignificant and worthless, about to be thrown away. When referring to persons, it is slightly depreciatory, used especially for inferior, sick, incompetent or weak persons (the noun often denotes older persons: skröplig gubbe, "weak old man"). But the noun is also used for small beings with supernatural characteristics, particularly in fairy tales.) – Toffle's love-object in Who Will Comfort Toffle?

=== Misabel ===
(Swedish: Misan – misär, "misery"; miserabel, "miserable") – a very depressed and paranoid female character. In comics and picture books, she is usually the Moomin family's domestic help. Misabel has her only novel appearance in Moominsummer Madness, in which she is not a domestic help, but shows up to be a good actress. She is sometimes the owner of Sorry-oo. It has been said that Misabel's initial reaction to anyone talking to her is fear of them complaining about the quality of her work.

=== Muddler ===
(Swedish: Rådd-djuret – rådda "to fuss or muddle or mess about" + djur, "animal") – The nephew of Hodgkins and Sniff's father. A rather untidy and confused individual who collects buttons of all sorts and lives in the coffee tin where he keeps the buttons. Married to Fuzzy.

=== The Muskrat ===
(Swedish: Bisamråttan) – a philosopher who believes in the pointlessness of things and reads Spengler, appears in Comet in Moominland and Finn Family Moomintroll. The Moomin children annoy him by putting hairbrushes in his bed and such like. He eventually takes to living in the cave Sniff discovers in order to get some peace. There is an unfortunate accident, however: in Finn Family Moomintroll, Moomintroll has hidden the Hobgoblin's hat there; anything you put in the Hobgoblin's hat becomes transformed, and the Muskrat gets a nasty shock when he puts his false teeth in it to keep the sand out of them. He enjoys reading a book entitled "the uselessness of everything" which is later changed by the Hobgoblin to "the usefulness of everything".

Muskrat is according to Tuula Karjalainen an "unmistakable portrait of Atos Wirtanen, ... a little clumsy and impractical, as Atos was".

=== The Mymbles ===
(Swedish: Mymlan – mymla, a slang word used in Tove Jansson's circle, with the meaning "to have sex" (and the character "the Mymble" accordingly has many children); compare mumla, "to mumble";) – "the Mymble" is a description given to two different characters. In The Exploits of Moominpappa, there is a matriarchal character known as "the Mymble". She is the mother of a very large and unspecified number of children, including Little My, Snufkin, and a girl referred to simply as "the Mymble's Daughter" (Swedish: Mymlans dotter), who appears to be the eldest of the Mymble's children, and helps her mother with child care for her younger brothers and sisters. In later books and in the comic strips, the Mymble's Daughter comes to be known as just "the Mymble". She appears again as a relatively minor character in Moominsummer Madness, Moominland Midwinter and the comic strips, and is a significant character in Moominvalley in November and in The Book about Moomin, Mymble and Little My.

=== Niblings ===
(Swedish: klippdassar – "rock hyraxes"; compare dassa, "patter or sneak around, walk quietly; (in some areas) hurry up when working; (in child language and rhymes) dance"; also called by the variant name klibbtassar, explained as klibba/klibbig, "to stick/sticky" + tass, "paw") – small aquatic creatures, which chew off people's noses if they are too long for their taste. They enjoy doing the multiplication contests devised by the rather bossy Hemulen's Aunt.

=== Ninny ===
(Swedish – a real female first name, mostly used as a nickname, e.g. for Anna) – Ninny first appears in Tales From Moomin Valley in the story "The Invisible Child". She turned invisible by being frightened too much by her former caretaker. This caretaker gave Ninny to Too-ticky, who then brought her to Moominmama to help make Ninny visible again. Moominmamma succeeds with one of her granny's 'Infallible Household Remedies' and lots of love. Ninny at first is a bore and doesn't know how to play games or have fun. She becomes completely visible during a day on the beach. Moominpappa plans on sneaking up and scaring Moominmamma, but Ninny rushes up behind and shoves Moominpappa into the sea. In the end, the family realizes Ninny is very similar to Little My.

=== The Park Keeper ===
(Swedish: parkvakten) – a Hemulen in charge of a park where the vegetation is trimmed and cut into proper lines and shapes. The park goes by very strict rules, mostly forbidding things, which are written out in big letters on several signs placed around the park. Of all the people in the world, the Park Keeper is the only one Snufkin really dislikes. Snufkin plants Hattifattener seeds in the grounds of the park to drive the Keeper away and then burns all the signs forbidding things.

The Park Keeper is the main antagonist of the 2024 video game Snufkin: Melody of Moominvalley.

=== The Police Inspector ===
(Swedish: Polismästaren) – a by-the-book Hemulen in charge of law enforcement in the valley. He has a crush on Mymble.

=== Sniff ===
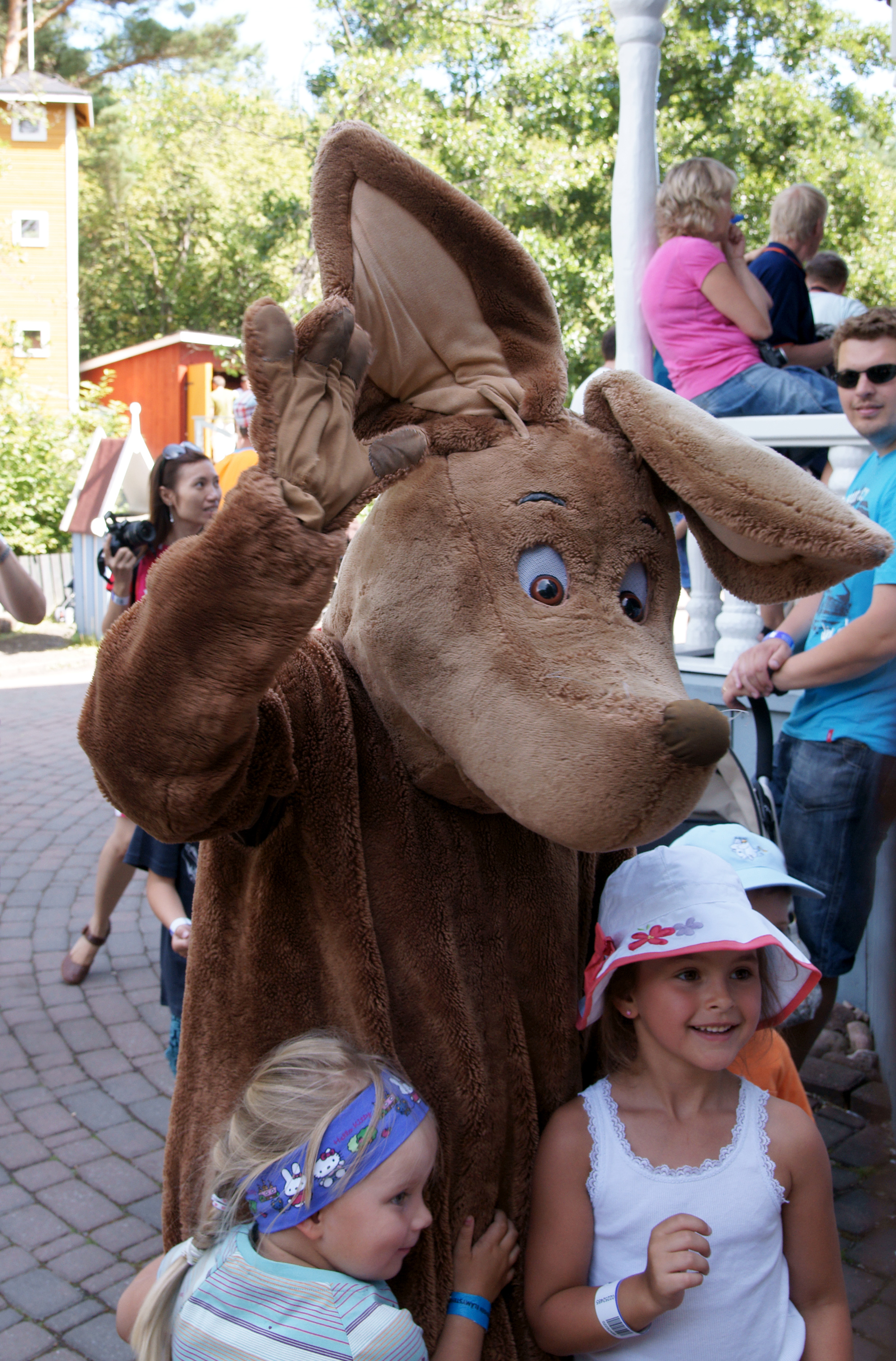
Sniff in Moomin World theme park, Naantali, Finland

(Swedish: Sniff – sniffa, "to snuff/sob; to sniff") – Moomintroll's immature friend. He is one of the few characters who is interested in money, and is always on the lookout for another way to get rich quick.

=== Snork ===
(Swedish: Snorken) – the Snork Maiden's older brother, also friends with Moomintroll. He and his sister first meet Moomintroll in Comet in Moominland. After that he appears only in Finn Family Moomintroll. He is described as mauve in colour, though changes to a pale green when frightened. His character is obsessive over details, rules, and protocol in the books. In the animated 1990 series, he is described as an avid inventor who has strong belief in the power of science and an obsession with building a flying vehicle.

=== Sorry-oo ===
(Swedish: Ynk – ynklig, "poor; miserable"; ynka sig, "moan (v.)"; or ynka, "insignificant") – a small dog appearing in various relations – however, he is always melancholic and longing. He has his only novel appearance in Moominland Midwinter, in which he is constantly howling after his distant cousins the wolves. In The Dangerous Journey, he is called "Sorry-oo Le Miserable" (Ynk von Jämmerlund: jämra sig, "to moan"; jämmer, "moaning," as in jämmerdal, "vale of tears"; playing on family names in Finland with von, which indicates a foreign name, and -lund).

=== Stinky ===
(Stinky: from English, although Swedish also has the verb stinka (to stink) – a criminal by profession, trickster, and a dangerous influence who tempts the Moomin family to do things that are against the law or otherwise cause problems for them for his own entertainment. He has a code of conduct of his own, and is offended when the Moomins want to give him a large sum of money which has been causing them much trouble. Physically, Stinky looks like some sort of furry mammal, whose most characteristic attribute is his constant, unbearable stench. He appears in one book (Villain in the Moominhouse) but mainly in comics and cartoons.

Stinky caused a controversy due to allegations of racism related to his appearance when he appeared in the Tove Jansson and the Moomins: The Door Is Always Open exhibition held at the Brooklyn Public Library in 2025, and it was decided to remove the character from the exhibition.

=== Thingumy and Bob ===
(Swedish: Tofslan och Vifslan – tofs, "tuft"; dialectical vivsa, "tuft," cf. vifta, "wave") – two little creatures who turn up in Moominvalley with a large suitcase. They speak a strange language: in the Swedish original, "-sla(n)" is appended to the ends of some words, while in the English translation of Trollkarlens hatt, Finn Family Moomintroll, they use spoonerisms, e.g. "'Man you cake it out?' asked Thingumy. 'Mot nutch,' said Bob". The names Tofslan and Vifslan were the pet names of Jansson and her theatre director lover Vivica Bandler, a subtlety lost in translation.

=== Toffle ===
(Swedish: Knytt – as a common noun also translated "creep", e.g. småknytt "little creatures/creeps", etymologically related to "oknytt" which by convention are to knytt what unseelie are to seelie; knytte, "bundle; (fig.) term of endearment for infants, 'little mite'; (in some dial.) short and/or plump woman"; knytt, dialectical noun from knyst, "the slightest sound") – Toffles are small creatures, shy, scared and confused. A toffle called Salome is featured in Moominland Midwinter. A toffle only named as "Toffle" is the main character in Who Will Comfort Toffle?, and it somewhat resembles Tove Jansson.

=== Toft ===
(Swedish: (homsan) Toft – for homsan see "Whomper"; Toft is a small, very shy boy who appears in Moominvalley in November. Toft makes up one of the people visiting the Moomins while they are absent. He is very mysterious and seems to have the power to make things he imagines come true. He is also able to use Moominpapa's crystal ball. In the original book, Toft is a whomper, but the English translator translated his character into a "boy".

=== Too-Ticky ===
(Swedish: Too-ticki) – a friend of the family, craftswoman and practical philosopher. Has her first appearance in the novel Moominland Midwinter and returns in the short stories of Tales from Moominvalley and in comics. The character and the name are modelled after Tuulikki Pietilä, Tove Jansson's life partner.

=== Whomper ===
(Swedish: Homsan – in the plural Whompses in Who Will Comfort Toffle?; homsa or håmsa, "rush, hurry, bustle, or muddle about (v.); do something carelessly (for example work), usually with bad results (v.); untidy or careless female (n.)") – an earnest little chap. He joins the Moomin family on the floating theater in Moominsummer Madness.

=== The Witch ===
(Swedish: Häxan – "The Witch", Japanese: Kurarissa (クラリッサ) – "Clarissa") – The Witch looks quite scary and has some powerful magic in her possession, but is a harmless old lady – despite her strong dislike of the Moomins. She would prefer Alicia not to play with them and pay more attention to her studies, but she does warm up for them later on. The Witch first appeared in the 1990 animated series and does not appear in the original stories or comic strips.

== Sources ==
- Karjalainen, Tuula (2014). Tove Jansson. Work and Love. Penguin Books. ISBN 978-1846148491.
