= The Moomins and the Great Flood =

1945 children's book by Tove Jansson

- First edition
- Author: Tove Jansson
- Original title: Småtrollen och den stora översvämningen
- Translator: David McDuff
- Language: Swedish
- Series: Moomins
- Genre: Children's novel
- Publication date: 1945
- Publication place: Finland
- English publication date: 2005
- Pages: 52
- ISBN: 951-50-1550-2 (English)
- OCLC: 76859232
- Followed by: Comet in Moominland

The Moomins and the Great Flood (Swedish: Småtrollen och den stora översvämningen, literally The Little Trolls and the Great Flood) is a book by the Finland Swedish author Tove Jansson. It was published in 1945, during the last months of World War II. It was the first book to star the Moomins, but is often seen as a prelude to the main Moomin books, as most of the main characters are introduced in the next book.

== Plot ==
Moominmamma and Moomintroll are travelling through a dark and scary forest looking for Moominpappa, who has gone off adventuring with the Hattifatteners. They meet a little creature, who joins them (in later books he is named Sniff). They use a glowing tulip to light their way, and are attacked by a giant serpent whilst crossing a swamp. They are saved when a beautiful young girl with shining blue hair called Tulippa emerges from the tulip and scares the serpent away.

They later arrive at a mountain and find the home of an old man, who invites them to live in his garden, which is made entirely of sweets. However, when they find out that the sun is really a giant lamp and there's no real food, they leave and continue their journey, travelling through the mountain to the beach on the other side. On the beach, Moominmamma gets attacked by an ant-lion, but Moomintroll and the others manage to save her. Deciding to move on, they come across a group of Hattifatteners about to set sail on a boat, and join them. A storm strikes, but a sea-troll helps them out and navigates the boat to a large harbour where they go ashore.

Parting ways with the Hattifatteners, they travel inland and meet a boy with red hair who lives in a lighthouse. Tulippa decides to stay with him, but the others set out after Moominpappa when they learn from the boy that he had passed through recently. Soon a rainstorm that lasts for several days causes a flood, and Moominmamma saves a family of cats. When the rain stops, they sail across the flooded landscape on an armchair and find a message in a bottle from Moominpappa, saying he has escaped the flood by climbing up a tree. As the water starts going down, they finally reach dry land and start searching for Moominpappa. Unsuccessful at first, they finally find him with the help of a marabou stork who flies them up into the air.

Reunited, the Moomin family and the little creature travel on until they find the house Moominpappa had built, carried into a small valley by the flood, and decide to live there.

== English translation ==
This was the last Moomin book to be translated into English, in 2005, to celebrate 60 years of the Moomins. It was published by Schildts publishing house in a limited hardback version. The book gained a good reception from The Guardian. A paperback edition is published by Puffin Books.
