= Snufkin =

Moomin character

- Moomins character
- Snufkin as seen in the 1990 Moomin animated television series.
- First appearance: Comet in Moominland
- Created by: Tove Jansson

In-universe information
- Gender: Male
- Relatives: Joxter (father); Mymble (mother); Mymble's Daughter (older half-sister); Little My (half-sister); Many other half-brothers and half-sisters

Snufkin (original Swedish: Snusmumrik[en] or Mumrik[en]) is a character in the Moomin series of books written by Swedish-speaking Finn Tove Jansson, appearing in six of the nine books; his first appearance is in the second book, Comet in Moominland. He is the best friend of the series' protagonist, Moomintroll, and lives a nomadic lifestyle, only staying in Moominvalley in the spring and summer, leaving for warmer climates down south every winter. He is the son of the elder Mymble and the Joxter, and is half-brother to the Mymble's daughter and Little My.

== Description ==
Snufkin wears old green clothes and a wide-brimmed hat that he has had since birth. He lives in a tent, smokes a pipe and plays the harmonica. Snufkin also has a great dislike for authority figures such as the Park Keeper and the many regulation signs and fences he erects. At one point, he sabotages the Park Keeper by planting Hattifatteners in his garden, causing them to grow and drive him out. He has a great hatred for all symbols of private property, even losing his temper with the Hemulen after the latter attempts to put up a sign declaring "Moominvalley".

Snufkin's age is never specified outright in any of the books. He has had more mature conversations with Moominpappa and is notoriously wise and mysterious. However, he enjoys playing with Moomintroll and other children, and sometimes acts just as childishly as them. He is also referred to as young and/or a child multiple in the series, and is younger than Little My, though he is easily twice her size. In times of conflict, others often turn to Snufkin for help, and he enjoys the unreserved admiration of the inhabitants of the valley for his wisdom. His advice is also followed. Snufkin's way of thinking reflects a wide range of philosophical views. He is undoubtedly one of the most multi-faceted characters in The Moomins. Snufkin has said that no one should own more than they can handle, and he cannot understand his friend Sniff's affection for worldly things. Snufkin once even throws his tent in the gorge, because he thinks it is not worth clinging to useless property, preferring instead to write a poem when he sees something beautiful.

== Analysis ==
Tove Jansson based the character of Snufkin on her friend and one-time fiancé, Atos Wirtanen. A typical feature of Snufkin, to come and go independently without caring for others, is inspired by the nature of Atos Wirtanen; at the time, Wirtanen was the center of Jansson's life, but Wirtanen was so busy working as an MP that he came and went, leading to the failure of their relationship. Wirtanen's style was also borrowed in the recognizable green hat of Snufkin.

The character has had a mostly positive reception.

== Adaptations ==
Snufkin serves as the main protagonist in the 2024 video game Snufkin: Melody of Moominvalley.

== Bibliography ==
- Jansson, Tove (1974) [1970]. Moominvalley in November. London: Penguin Books. ISBN 978-0-374-45309-1.
- Jones, W. Glyn (1984). Vägen från Mumindalen (in Swedish). Hangö: Bonniers. ISBN 91-0-046191-1.
