= Moominvalley in November =

1970 children's book by Tove Jansson

- First edition
- Author: Tove Jansson
- Language: Swedish
- Series: Moomins
- Genre: Children's novel
- Publisher: Schildts
- Publication date: 1970
- Publication place: Finland
- English publication date: 1971
- Preceded by: Moominpappa at Sea
- Followed by: none

Moominvalley in November (Swedish: Sent i november, 'Late in November') is the ninth and final book in the Moomin series by Finnish author Tove Jansson, and was first published in her native Swedish in 1970, and in English in 1971. Set contemporaneously with her 1965 novel Moominpappa at Sea, it is the only book in the series where the titular Moomin family are absent. Instead it focuses on a set of other characters, including Toft and Snufkin, who come to live at Moominhouse during the onset of winter whilst its inhabitants are away, and their interactions with each other.

The book has been described as being about loss and the finiteness of life, with a sombre tone. Jansson commented that she was unable to go back to the happy Moominvalley, so the series came to an end. Jansson felt that the book might be enjoyed more by adults than by children. Readers have said that the book feels like autumn, and is a comfort for people depressed by Scandinavia's dark Novembers. The book addresses serious themes including the existential, the unconscious, and the melancholic, expressing feelings from anxiety and longing to transience and restlessness. The text has been described as both self-reflexive and metafictional.

== Plot ==
Set in the final days of autumn, various characters begin to experience a change within themselves and decide to travel to Moominvalley where they can visit the Moomins. First is Toft, a small orphan who lives alone in a docked boat under a tarpaulin, he has often dreamed about the Moomins, but has never met them. Secondly is Fillyjonk, a woman who is usually obsessed with everything being neat and tidy, but who has an epiphany after suffering an accident and decides to "see people. People who talked and were pleasant and went in and out and filled the whole day so that there was no time for terrible thoughts". The Hemulen similarly begins to question his lifestyle, realising that his life as a collector and organiser of things simply isn't necessary, whilst a senile old man who cannot remember his own name but who calls himself Grandpa-Grumble decides to go to the "Happy Valley" that he remembers from the past. Alongside these figures, Mymble decides to visit the Moomins in order to see her sister Little My whom they have adopted, and Snufkin also returns, realising that the valley is the place where he can gain inspiration to write a song.

When they all arrive, they discover that the Moomin family have left their house, and so they all settle in to wait for their return. Soon, their conflicting personalities begin to cause friction, with the Fillyjonk trying to tell the others what they should do.

Toft finds an old microbiology textbook, and misinterpreting it as a story, creates a monster in his imagination known as the Creature, which appears to develop a life of its own. Meanwhile, Grandpa-Grumble becomes obsessed with both fishing in a nearby stream that he insists is actually a brook as well as with meeting the Ancestor, a three-hundred-year-old Moomin who he is told by Mymble hibernates in the stove. After becoming terrified that there are insects in the house, Fillyjonk locks herself in the kitchen and, in an attempt to be more like Moominmamma and therefore liked by the others, cooks for them and tries to look after the motherless Toft, who is enlisted by the Hemulen into helping build a treehouse for Moominpappa.

Grandpa-Grumble gets a stomachache and refuses to take his medicines till the others throw a party for him and the Ancestor. At the party, each of the characters gives a performance: the Hemulen recites one of his poems; Toft reads from his book; Mymble dances to Snufkin's music; and Fillyjonk cooks Welsh rarebit and gives a shadow puppet show about the Moomin family returning home. However, the Ancestor does not appear, as Grandpa-Grumble had mistaken his own reflection in a mirror upstairs for the Ancestor, to whom he makes everyone drink a toast.

The morning after the party, Fillyjonk organises the cleaning of the house, though it soon begins to snow, and she decides to leave, finally on good terms with the Hemulen. Meanwhile, Grandpa-Grumble concludes that the winter ages people and so decides to go into hibernation in the clothes cupboard like the Ancestor. The treehouse that the Hemulen was building collapses, so Snufkin takes him sailing in his boat, though the Hemulen realises that he gets sea-sick, and after the trip leaves to go home.

After discovering the last five bars he needed to write his song, and finding them to be "more beautiful and even simpler than he ever hoped they would be", Snufkin packs up his tent and leaves the valley. Toft, left alone to wait for the return of the Moomins, realises how the view of the family which he had developed in his imagination is too perfect to be real, and accepts that even Moominmamma, who he hoped will be his mother, has problems just like everybody else. Seeing that "the boat [upon which the Moomins are returning] was a very long way away", he walks down to the jetty to wait for them.

== Reception ==
The Times Literary Supplement described the book as "possibly the cleverest of the Moomin books", whilst Philip Ardagh, writing for The Guardian in 2003, similarly praised it, describing the work as "melancholy" and comparing the character of Toft with that of Toffle, another lonely child, from Jansson's picture book Who Will Comfort Toffle?.

The children's author Leona Wisoker, an admirer of Jansson, described the work as being "a terrific mixture of keen psychological insight and Jansson's trademark humor" that left her "aching, wishing Jansson had written more in the series; but all good things must come to an end, and I wouldn't be pleased at all if anyone else dared to pick up the series in her wake."

The screenwriter and children's author Frank Cottrell Boyce – another Jansson enthusiast – describes the novel as "the wisest and most moving book about mourning I've ever read."

== Analysis ==
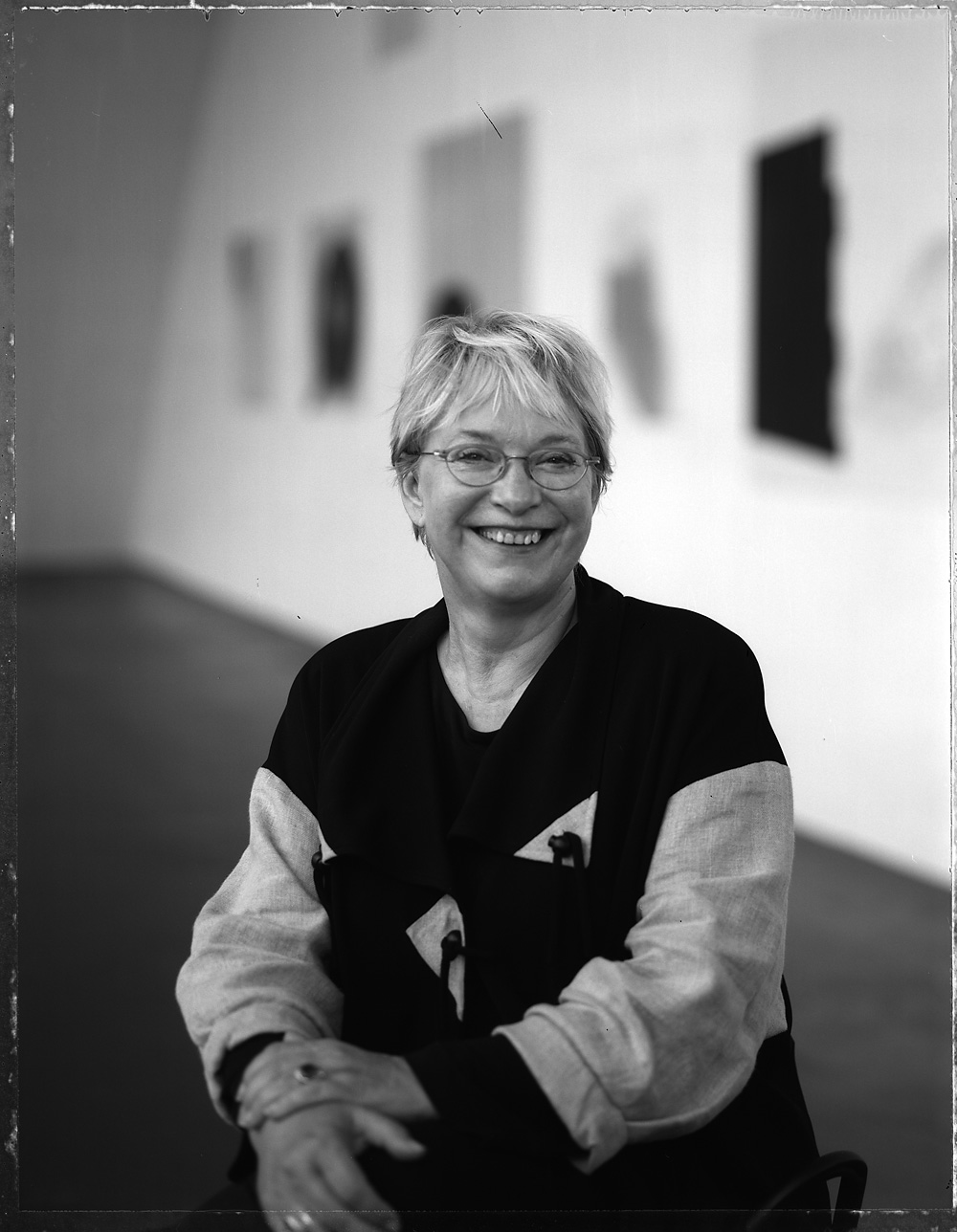
Janson's biographer, Tuula Karjalainen, states that "loss and the finiteness of life" are the book's main themes.

Jansson's biographer, Tuula Karjalainen, wrote that "loss and the finiteness of life" were the major themes of Sent i november. Jansson remarked of the book that "it seems to play in a minor key, [but] I couldn't make it play any other way"; Evan James, in The Yale Review, comments that all the same, "the droll, spirited world of the Moomins furnishes the instrument for this song of loss." He writes that, in the absence of the Moomin family, the orphaned character Toft searches for a mother and the rest of the cast have to keep going despite not knowing whether they will see the Moomins again. James notes that at the time Jansson's mother, Signe Hammarsten-Jansson, was close to death.

Because of the novel's sombre tone, it has been described as being a "textbook on letting go, being a mature orphan, existing spiritually alone". After writing the book, Jansson stated that she "couldn't go back and find that happy Moominvalley again" and so decided to end the series.

Anna Ovaska writes that this last of the Moomin books is taken by readers to be Jansson's farewell to Moominvalley. In her view, it is "not only about autumn, loss and sorrow but also about creativity, hope and new beginnings." She notes that Jansson wrote of the book "I will tell a story about how dream is more important than reality." Ovaska writes that it is an unexpected and unsettling book, without the Moomin family present; Jansson felt that the book might be enjoyed more by adults than by children. Indeed, readers have commented that they find in it a mix of "anxiety and safety", that it "feels like autumn", and that it is found comforting for people feeling depressed by Scandinavia's dark Novembers. The absence of the Moomin family is felt in the effect it has on the characters, especially the lonely Toft but also Fillyjonk, Hemulen, Grandpa-Grumble, Mymble, and Snufkin, all of whom are searching for something. Readers have experienced grief and loss without the usual happy atmosphere of Moominvalley.

Jansson's illustration of (left to right) Mymble, Grandpa-Grumble, Toft, Snufkin and the Hemulen watching the Fillyjonk's shadow play in the book's culminating scene, the party. Scholars have described the scene as full of self-reflexive and metatextual references. One such is the shadow play, which alludes to the desired return of the Moominfamily, who have gone away: a metatext is that the book series itself is coming to an end.

Ovaska comments that "the characters begin by wanting to become something other than they are but they end up finding their authentic selves, as many academic readers point out". She quotes Mymble's speech to this effect: "A hemulen is always a hemulen and the same things happen to him all the time. ... 'Will you always be the same?' Fillyjonk asked her out of curiosity. 'I certainly hope so!' Mymble answered."

Scholars such as Katri Kivilaakso have noted self-reflexive and metafictional themes in the novel. Thus, the Moominfamily's absence can be read as a way into an exploration of loss for the characters; an invitation to readers to think about Moominvalley afresh; and an allusion to the end of the Moomin series. As another example, Jansson makes the character Toft tell tales of Moominvalley in summertime. This, Ovaska writes, both links the novel to the earlier Moomin books, and creates "mise-en-abyme structures that reflect the construction of the novel itself." She adds that the elements of self-reflexiveness and metafiction are strongest in the culminating party scene, where the characters each take an action "that characterizes their situation in the novel." For example, Hemulen recites a "highly intertextual" poem on the theme "life is but a dream". Into the stagnant space that follows, Mymble performs a lively dance, changing the mood; Toft finally opens up and shares his private world of imagination; and Fillyjonk stages a shadow play called "The Return" with the Moominfamily in a boat sailing home to Moominvalley.

The psychologist Espen Håland examines the book for psychoanalytic ideas. In his view, the book is true to life, addressing "the existential, the unconscious and the melancholic." He comments that the book describes many emotions, including anxiety, longing, rage, transience, and restlessness.

== See also ==
- Finn Family Moomintroll – the book that made the Moomins and Tove Jansson internationally famous
- The Summer Book – a book for adults written soon after the death of Jansson's mother
