= Visor från Mumindalen =

1993 Moomin-related songbook

Visor från Mumindalen, or Songs from the Moominvalley, is a songbook from 1993 by the Finnish-Swedish author Tove Jansson, which she wrote with her brother Lars Jansson and Erna Tauro. It is a collection of classic songs inspired by the characters in the Moomin World. The lyrics were written by Tove and Lars Jansson while the music was composed by Erna Tauro. Visor från Mumindalen was published along with the melody parts with lyrics and chords. "Muminpappans visa" (Moominpapa's Song), "Tootickis vintervisa" (Too Ticky's Winter Song) and "Julsång för knytt" (Christmas Carols for Toffle) are some of the songs found in the songbook.
