= Taikatalvi =

Taikatalvi may refer to:

- Moominland Midwinter (Finnish: Taikatalvi), the fifth book in Tove Jansson's Moomins series of books
- "Taikatalvi" (English: "Midwinter Ancestor"), the thirteenth episode of the first season of Finnish animated TV series Moominvalley
- "Taikatalvi", a 2011 song by Nightwish from Imaginaerum
