= The Dangerous Journey =

1977 children's book by Tove Jansson

- First edition
- Author: Tove Jansson
- Original title: Den farliga resan
- Translator: Kingsley Hart
- Language: Swedish
- Publisher: Schildts/Gebers (Original); Ernest Benn (English)
- Publication date: 24 August 1977
- Publication place: Finland
- English publication date: 1978
- Media type: Hardcover
- Pages: 28
- ISBN: 051000038X
- OCLC: 58486036
- Preceded by: Who Will Comfort Toffle?
- Followed by: Villain in the Moominhouse

The Dangerous Journey (Swedish: Den farliga resan) is a 1977 children's Moomin picture book with text and illustrations by the Finland Swedish writer Tove Jansson. Its perilous adventure has been likened to Lewis Carroll's Alice in Wonderland. The book's illustrations have been considered to be an artistic homage to two creators of illustrations for children's books, Elsa Beskow and John Bauer.

== Plot ==
The book takes the reader on an illustrated and quirky journey through Moominvalley, capturing the impact as seen through the eyes of Susanna. It follows the nightmarish adventures of Susanna, the Hemulen, Sniff, Sorry-Oo and Thingumy and Bob through Moominvalley.

== Analysis ==
The journey in the story is a revisiting of Moominvalley, after several years had elapsed since Jansson had last written about it; it came out over 15 years after the preceding picture book, Who Will Comfort Toffle?. Moomintroll and his family are confined to their valley: they can be visited and left again in the story, just as Jansson herself was doing. Her biographer Boel Westin comments that the story is thus "markedly metafictive in character", speaking about the artist's own path as much as about the doings of the characters.

Westin likens the book's protagonist Susanna to Lewis Carroll's Alice in Wonderland, who like Susanna visits a realm where stories go "backwards or contrariwise". Westin comments that Susanna's journey reflects Jansson's own childhood, "full of pictures and stories".

Further, Westin suggests that the book is an artistic homage to the Swedish artist and children's author Elsa Beskow, and to the Swedish artist and illustrator John Bauer. In particular, she writes, the book begins with a "midsummer night's dream" as in Beskow's 1914 picture book Flower Festival in the Hill, and travels through two Bauer paintings, his 1913 watercolour Still, Tuvstarr sits and gazes down into the water and his 1904–1905 watercolour Lapplanders in snowstorm.

Boel Westin suggests the book is an homage to the Swedish illustrators Elsa Beskow and John Bauer.

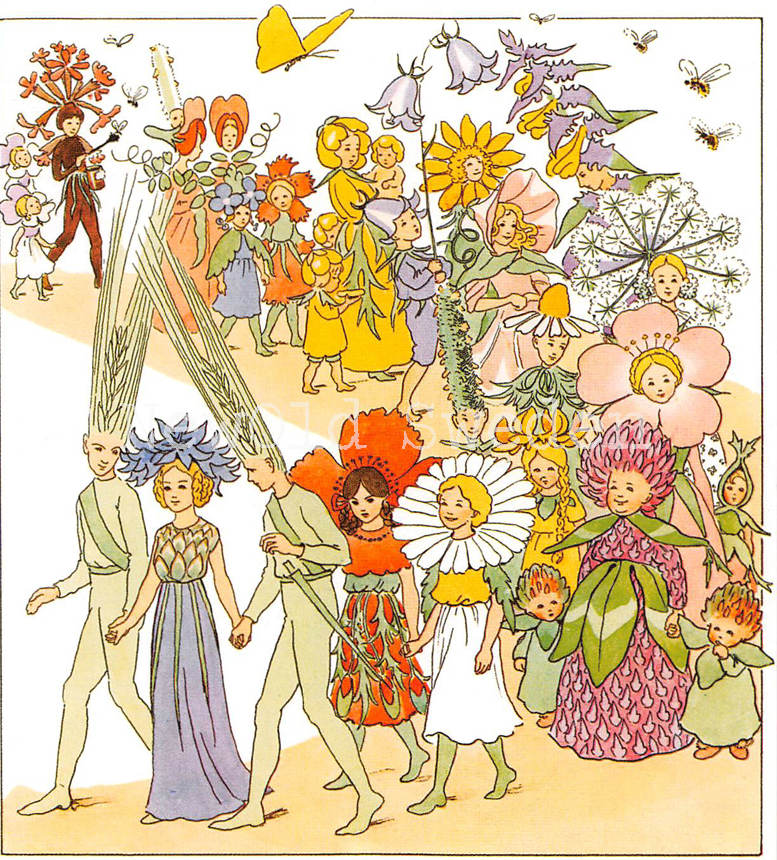
Flower Festival, Elsa Beskow, 1914

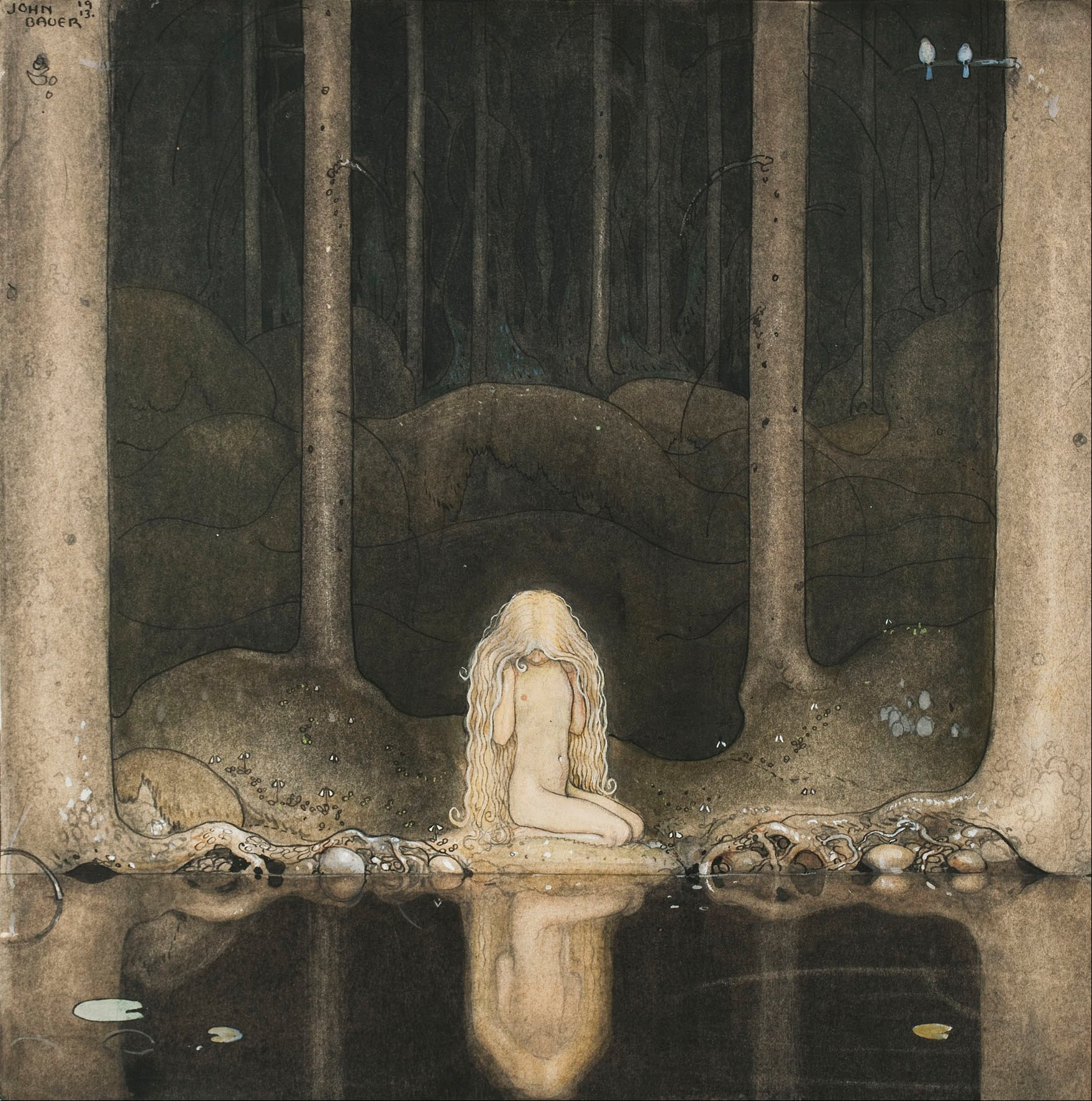
Still, Tuvstarr sits and gazes down into the water, watercolour by John Bauer, 1913

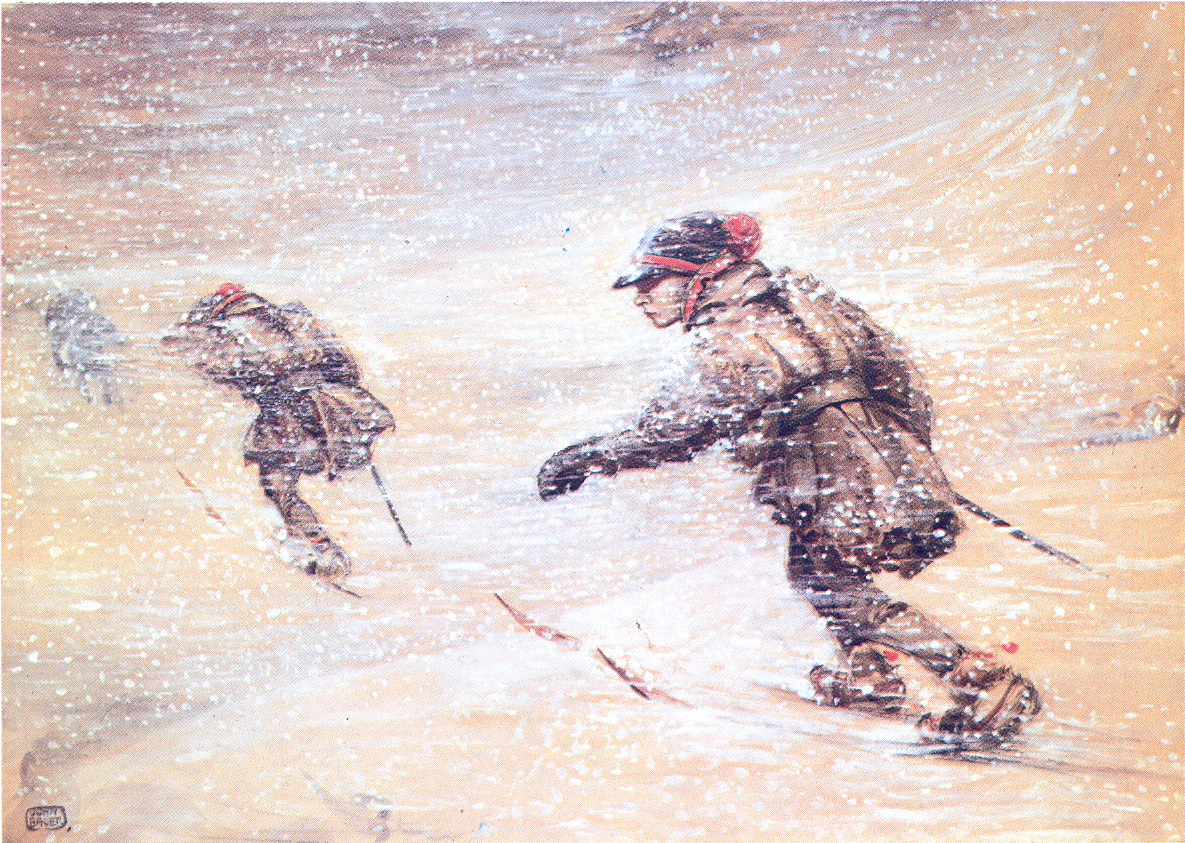
Lapplanders in snowstorm, watercolour by John Bauer, 1904–1905

== Translations ==
A translation by Kingsley Hart was published in English by Ernest Benn in 1978.

A new edition was published in the UK by Sort of Books in 2010.

== See also ==
- Moomin

== Sources ==
- Westin, Boel (2014) [2007]. Tove Jansson Life, Art, Words: The Authorised Biography. Translated by Mazzarella, Silvester. Sort of Books. ISBN 978-1-908745-45-3.
