= Moomintroll: Winter's Warmth =

2026 video game

- Composer: Joar Renolen
- Series: Moomins
- Platforms: macOS; PlayStation 5; Nintendo Switch; Nintendo Switch 2; Windows
- Release: macOS, Switch, Windows; 27 April 2026; Switch 2, PlayStation 5; 18 September 2026
- Genre: Adventure
- Mode: Single-player

Moomintroll: Winter's Warmth is a 2026 video game based on the Moomins franchise, developed by Hyper Games and published by Kakehashi Games. It is a spiritual successor of the 2024 video game Snufkin: Melody of Moominvalley from the same developer. The player controls Moomintroll, who instead of winter hibernation wakes up in the middle of sleepy Moominvalley, which has been cloaked in the frosty veil of the Lady of the Cold.

It was released on 27 April 2026 for Windows, macOS and Nintendo Switch, and on 18 September 2026 for PlayStation 5 and Nintendo Switch 2.

== Development ==
As with the previous Snufkin: Melody of Moominvalley game, Hyper Games used a watercolor style in the game's design to pay homage to the style of Tove Jansson's Moomin books. Unlike the previous game, Winter's Warmth is directly based on Jansson's work, the sixth Moomin book, Moominland Midwinter (1957). Hyper Games also took liberties in developing the game, however, still negotiating with the Moomin Characters company, which is responsible for the all rights to the Moomins franchise; Moomin Characters has, among other things, dictated that game developers should not create new characters, include violence in the game, or use artificial intelligence.

== Reception ==
The review aggregation website Metacritic has summarised reviews of the game as "generally favorable". According to OpenCritic, 85% of critics have recommended the game.

== See also ==
- Moominland Midwinter – a 1957 book by Tove Jansson
