= Simon Parmet =

Finnish composer (1897–1969)

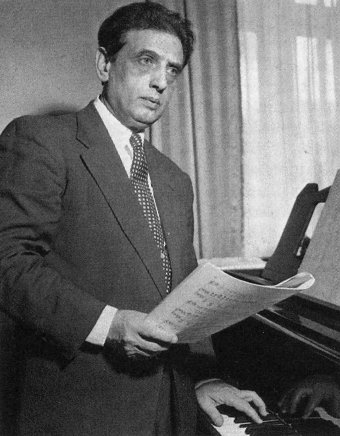
- Born: Simon Pergament; 26 October 1897; Helsinki, Finland
- Died: 20 July 1969 (aged 71); Helsinki, Uusimaa, Finland
- Occupations: Composer, conductor
- Spouse: Vera Smolensky

Simon Parmet (né Pergament; 26 October 1897 – 20 July 1969) was a Finnish conductor, composer, and pianist who studied under famous composer Jean Sibelius.

== Education and career ==
=== Education and formative years ===
Parmet began his career as a musician at the age of 15, when he was a dedicated pianist for the Helsinki Philharmonic Orchestra, although he would later study under Alexander Glazunov at the St. Petersburg Conservatory, and later at the Helsinki Music Institute and the Berlin Conservatory following the Russian Revolution. His teachers in Helsinki were Erik Furuhjelm and Erkki Melartin. He spent many of his early years in Finland studying under composer Jean Sibelius. Parmet was heavily influenced by his teacher, and would conduct many of Sibelius's works throughout his career, such as the American premiere of Luonnotar in 1952.

=== Opera ===
Earlier in his career, Parmet worked as an opera conductor in Germany, for the Finnish National Opera, and as conductor of the Finnish Symphony Radio Orchestra. He also co-founded the Akateeminen Laulu, of which he was the first director from 1953 to 1954. During his period in America, he was a director for the Finnish Male Chorus of New York City.

=== Conducting ===
In 1938, Parmet was invited by Polish violinist Bronisław Huberman to conduct the Palestine Symphony Orchestra. Parmet conducted many orchestras throughout the United States during the 1940s, such as repeat conducting of the New York Philharmonic Symphony Orchestra at Carnegie Hall, the El Paso Symphony Orchestra, and the Louisville Philharmonic. In addition to presenting Sibelius's works to America, he often shared many works by Finnish artists that were culturally obscure to Americans, such as his 1952 Philadelphia conducting of Symphonic Sketches by Ahti Sonninen.

=== Composing ===
One notable debut of Parmet's was a 1952 performance by Abraham Chavez, who performed an unpublished impromptu by Sibelius that Parmet had transcribed to ensure it would not be lost.

=== Recording and writing ===
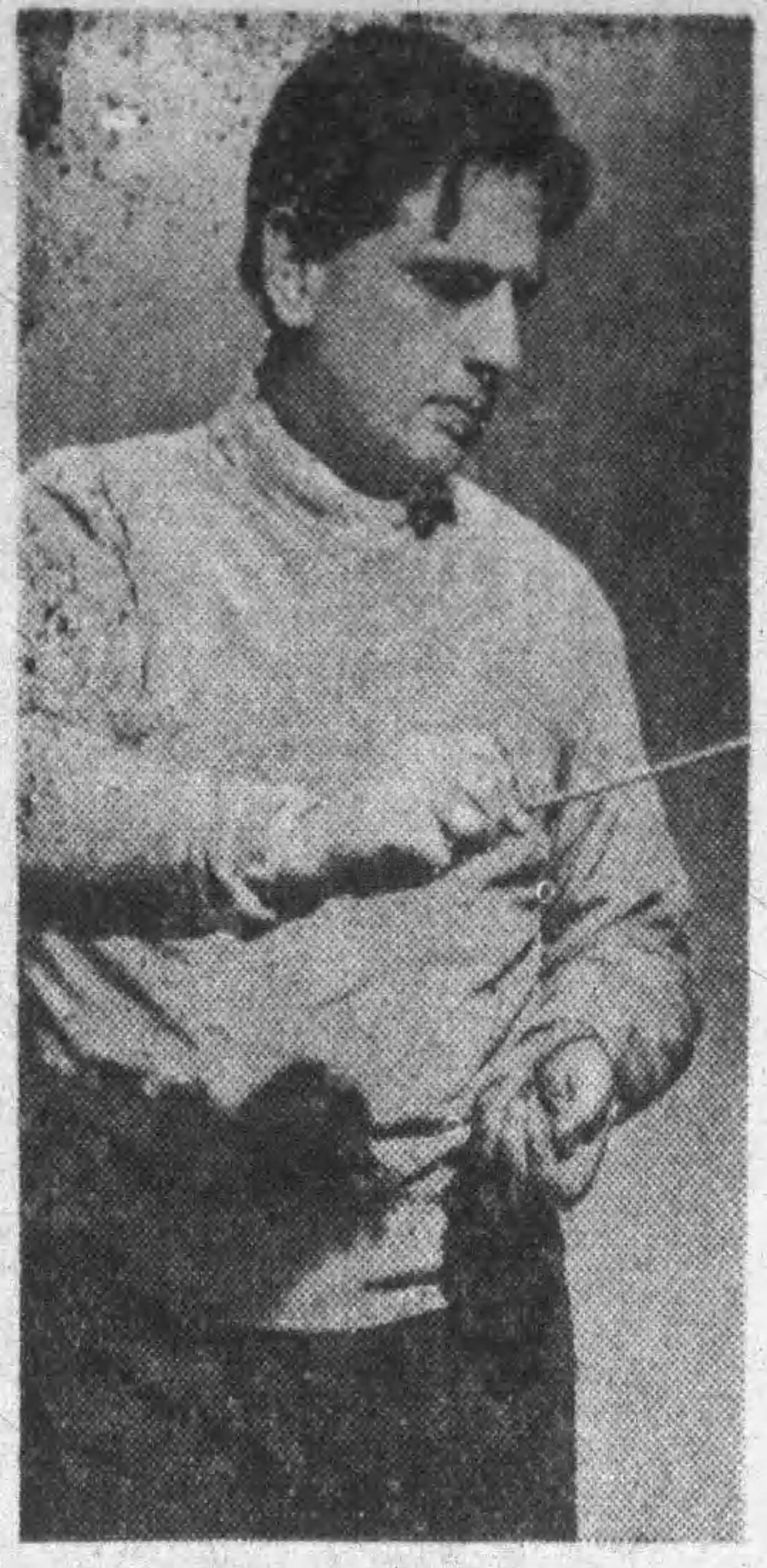
Parmet conducting, 1945

Parmet recorded his first compositions and conductions in Berlin in 1929. Recordings made under his direction can be found in the Yle recording archive, including Einar Englund's Symphony No. 2 (1951), Bengt Johansson's Expressions for Orchestra (1953), and Toivo Kuula's Stabat mater (1953). In 1962, he composed film music for Little Presents with the Radio Entertainment Orchestra. He also composed film music for the film The Doll Merchant (1955), directed by Jack Witikka. Parmet additionally published many musical and music theory books in Swedish.

=== Education ===
During his time in the United States, Parmet worked as the music department head at the Margaret Hall School in Versailles, Kentucky.

== Personal life and family ==
In the 1940s, Parmet temporarily moved from Finland to Elmira, New York and Washington, D.C. while conducting orchestras in the United States. Although he did not live out the rest of his life in the United States, he became a naturalized citizen in 1942 with his wife Vera.

His brother was Moses Pergament, a Finnish-Swedish composer and music critic. He is also the uncle of Swedish pianist Erna Tauro through her father, Isak Pergament.

Parmet died on 20 July 1969, and is buried in the New Jewish Cemetery in Helsinki.

== Bibliography ==
- Sibelius symfonier: en studie i musikförståelse (1959) (The symphonies of Sibelius: a study in musical appreciation)
- Con amor om musik och mästare (1960) (With love: on music and teachers)
- Sävelestä sanaan: esseitä (1962) (From verse to word: essays)
- Genom fönsterrutan: essäer om konst och musik och andra uppsatser (1964) (From the looking glass: essays on art and music)

== See also ==
- Performance of Simon Parmet's Mazurkas on Piano | Vimeo
