= Moominpappa at Sea =

1965 children's book by Tove Jansson

- First edition
- Author: Tove Jansson
- Original title: Pappan och havet
- Language: Swedish
- Series: Moomins
- Genre: Novel
- Publisher: Schildts
- Publication date: 1965
- Publication place: Finland
- OCLC: 861513559
- Preceded by: Tales from Moominvalley
- Followed by: Moominvalley in November

Moominpappa at Sea (Swedish: Pappan och havet, literally "The Father and the Sea") is the eighth book in the Moomin series by Finnish author Tove Jansson. First published in 1965, the novel is set contemporaneously with Moominvalley in November (Sent i november, 1970), and is the last in the series where the titular Moomin family are present within the narrative.

The book follows the titular Moomin family as they arrive on a deserted island in the middle of the sea, documenting their experiences as they become familiar with their newfound surroundings. The book is notable for its introspective and contemplative tone, unlike the other books in the series. Critics have noted its psychological approach, as Moominpappa has a masculinity crisis. The book has also been seen as about how to deal with loneliness, which appears in different forms but is healed by relationships.

The book is based primarily around the character of Moominpappa, who was heavily inspired by Jansson's father, Viktor Jansson. The book's original title is a loose reference to Ernest Hemingway novel The Old Man and the Sea, though this is not reflected in the English translation, and the text instead satirises Virginia Woolf's 1927 modernist novel To the Lighthouse.

The book is considered a classic of Swedish literature: it was named on the Sveriges Television programme Babel in 2013 as one of five books that should form the start of a Swedish literary canon.

== Plot ==
Moominpappa becomes dissatisfied with his life in Moominvalley, so he organizes a journey for his family to find a lighthouse in the sea. Upon arrival, they discover the island to be a desolate and lonely place, inhabited only by an unfriendly fisherman.

Moominpappa wishes to become the lighthouse keeper, but he gives up when he cannot figure out how to fix the lantern. He tries other projects, such as building a pier, fishing, and researching a small lake, but fails at all of them.

Meanwhile, Moominmamma becomes increasingly melancholic as her dream of planting a garden fails, and her longing for home grows stronger. She eventually starts painting the walls of the lighthouse with flowers until she has painted all of Moominvalley. She discovers that she can walk inside the painting to find peace.

Moomintroll explores the nearby woods and finds a thicket that he eventually moves into. He is disappointed to find it already inhabited by ants and asks Little My for help in getting them to move elsewhere. Little My solves the problem by exterminating the ants with petroleum, much to Moomintroll's dismay.

At night, Moomintroll looks for the seafillies whom he admires greatly. The fillies are selfish and mean to Moomintroll, but he does not care. As he tries to attract them by waving his lamp, he instead attracts the Groke, who freezes the ground where she walks. Every night, Moomintroll tries to call for the seafillies, but only ends up being accompanied by the Groke. Slowly, he starts to grow fond of her, and when the lamp ultimately runs out of kerosene, the Groke is no longer cold.

As the story draws to a close, the once disjointed family slowly comes together again. Together, they rescue the lonely fisherman who is in trouble in a rough sea. When they discover that his birthday is coming, they invite him to a party at the lighthouse, which he reluctantly attends, only to slowly realize that he is the original lighthouse keeper. Moominpappa and the fisherman find new purpose in their lives through their shared experience as the novel draws to a close.

== Reception ==
The book is considered a classic of Swedish literature: it was named on the Sveriges Television programme Babel in 2013 as one of only five books that should form the start of a Swedish literary canon. (Note: The other books were Vilhelm Moberg's Utvandrarepos, Kerstin Thorvall's Det mest förbjudna, Eyvind Johnson's Strändernas svall, and Hjalmar Bergman's Farmor och vår herre.)

Annina Rabe, in Svenska Dagbladet, writes that Moominpappa has a midlife and masculinity crisis in the book, feeling that he's no longer needed as everyone is managing quite well on their own. So, he takes them to the sea for an adventure in the hope they'll meet some dangers that he can protect them from.

Ella Andrén, on Dagensbok.com, writes that in the book, Jansson's discussion of her iconic Moomins, with their issues of gender roles and how to find one's place in a family, is deeply human.

Ida Fellman, on the Finnish national broadcaster Yle, wrote that the publication of Pappan och havet made many people wonder if the Moomin books had turned into adult reading. Jansson had replied at the time that there was no distinction between children's and adult's books, and commented that since Moominpappa was losing his masculine self-esteem, he wanted to be able protect his family again. Jansson added that as for Moominmamma, it was no fun always being perfect, harmonious, and a symbol of security; she included Little My to avoid making the whole story syrupy.

Jenny Tunedal, in the Swedish newspaper Aftonbladet, writes that Pappan och havet is a particularly comforting book for people with family issues. In her view, Jansson sets out extremely gently and precisely the roles of alpha male father and correspondingly depressed mother. She likens Moominmamma to Virginia Woolf's Lily Briscoe, and comments that Jansson portrays Moominpappa's character flaws "with tenderness, rigour, and humour". She adds that despite having had trouble understanding her own father, she recognises herself in Moominpappa.

Anna Dunér, on the Swedish Catholic website Signum, notes that Jansson's biographer, Tuula Karjalainen, has commented that the family ties in the Moomin books are both strong and open. In Dunér's view, this is particularly clear in Pappan och havet with the welcome given to Little My. She notes too the comment of the director of Stockholm's Finnish Institute, Bengt Packalén, that in the book, "Moomintroll has a puberty crisis, Moominpappa has a masculinity crisis, and Moominmamma keeps going, making a space for herself". Dunér writes that even the ghostly Groke (Mårran) who freezes the ground as she walks is happy when the Moomins come along, so even in her case there may be hope.

Kirkus Reviews wrote: "A psychological drama with an allegorical level, this chapter of the Moomin story cedes Moomin territory to the adults without totally dispossessing the children."

== Analysis ==
Jansson's book echoes features of Virginia Woolf's 1927 modernist novel To the Lighthouse.

The scholar of literature Mike Classon Frangos writes that Pappan och havet's Swedish title "clearly alludes to Ernest Hemingway's The Old Man and the Sea, yet the events of the novel build more closely on [Virginia] Woolf's To the Lighthouse", a modernist novel. He adds that each member of the Moomin family undertakes an "inward journey of discovery and transformation." Pappan och havet and the newspaper comic Moomin and the Sea share multiple story elements, but differ sharply in that the comic features an ongoing romance between Moomintroll and Snorkmaiden. Frangos comments that Jansson grows increasingly frustrated with "the gendered expectations of heteronormative romance" in the comic, remarking that her allusions to literary modernism are part of her satire of pretentious masculine literature, and that she was simultaneously "writing herself and her characters into a long genealogy of queer modernism."

Mike Frangos's comparison with Virginia Woolf's To the Lighthouse
Aspect	Pappan och havet	To the Lighthouse
Grow closer to family through journey to the lighthouse	Moominpappa	Mr. Ramsay
Observe the family from a distance	"Troublemaker" Lilla My	Lily Briscoe

Erik Jersenius, in Vestmanlands Läns Tidning, remarks the "Hemingway-sounding title" and the book's length, the longest of the Moomin books. He writes that "many consider it her greatest literary achievement ... with its fantastically clear and simply beautiful language".

Philip Teir, in Göteborgs-Tidningen, comments on similarities with Stephen King's 1977 novel The Shining with its family in a lonely place, "slowly losing its grip on existence".

The scholar of philosophy Arwen Dagmar Meereboer writes that the book can be seen as an illustration of what the political theorist Jane Bennett calls "Vibrant Matter". People are, she writes, "inextricably entangled in harm" to the material world, and in her view Jansson shows how people can live with that ethical reality. The Moomin family can live on the island only by ceasing to try to control its wildness, instead treating it as a living thing with its own will. Citing Meereboer, Marko Priiki notes that Jeff VanderMeer has named Jansson as an influence; Priiki suggests that both VanderMeer's novel Annihilation and Moominpappa at Sea deal with "ecohorror", indicating a "way towards an ecological awareness and coexistence."

The Finnish philosopher Sanna Tirkkonen, writing in Psykoterapia, considers the book to show how lonely people can best be helped with psychotherapy. She proposes that feeling lonely is an interactive process, and analyses the emotional environment in Moominpappa and the Sea where loneliness presents itself in different ways. She explains the ways in which the characters try to heal their own loneliness, and that of others. She notes that Jansson's letters and biography show that the book is an act of grieving for her father. Moominpappa's anger appears, she writes, as waves of the sea, while the family's fear is embodied in the island. Moominpappa's anger and feeling of meaninglessness are existential, underlying everything he does. Little My continually makes pointed remarks about Moominpappa's efforts to control his anger. Tirkkonen comments that the family lacks a shared strategy to get themselves out of loneliness, and quotes Elina Hirvonen's remark that "The loneliest are the children who are holding onto big secrets."

The Groke, in Tirkkonen's view, personifies loneliness, making the Moomin family afraid. Moominmamma tells Moomintroll it is not worth discussing the Groke's loneliness as that would only make it grow. Moomintroll wonders whether not talking about something or someone makes it vanish; he tries to cheer his mother up with small actions, and eventually talks to the Groke. Tirkkonen notes that when Jansson was criticised for "bourgeois escapism" (islands being rather expensive), she replied that the book addresses the crisis faced by the nuclear family, dogged by what Karjalainen called a "secret and cruel coolness". Jansson called the characters unbearably self-centred, but said that she found the uncomfortable feelings familiar. Tirkkonen comments that the book shows that people can be comfortable with solitude when relationships are in place; even the Groke starts to dance and no longer freezes the ground, while Moominmamma cheers up when she rediscovers her creative ability and starts to paint.

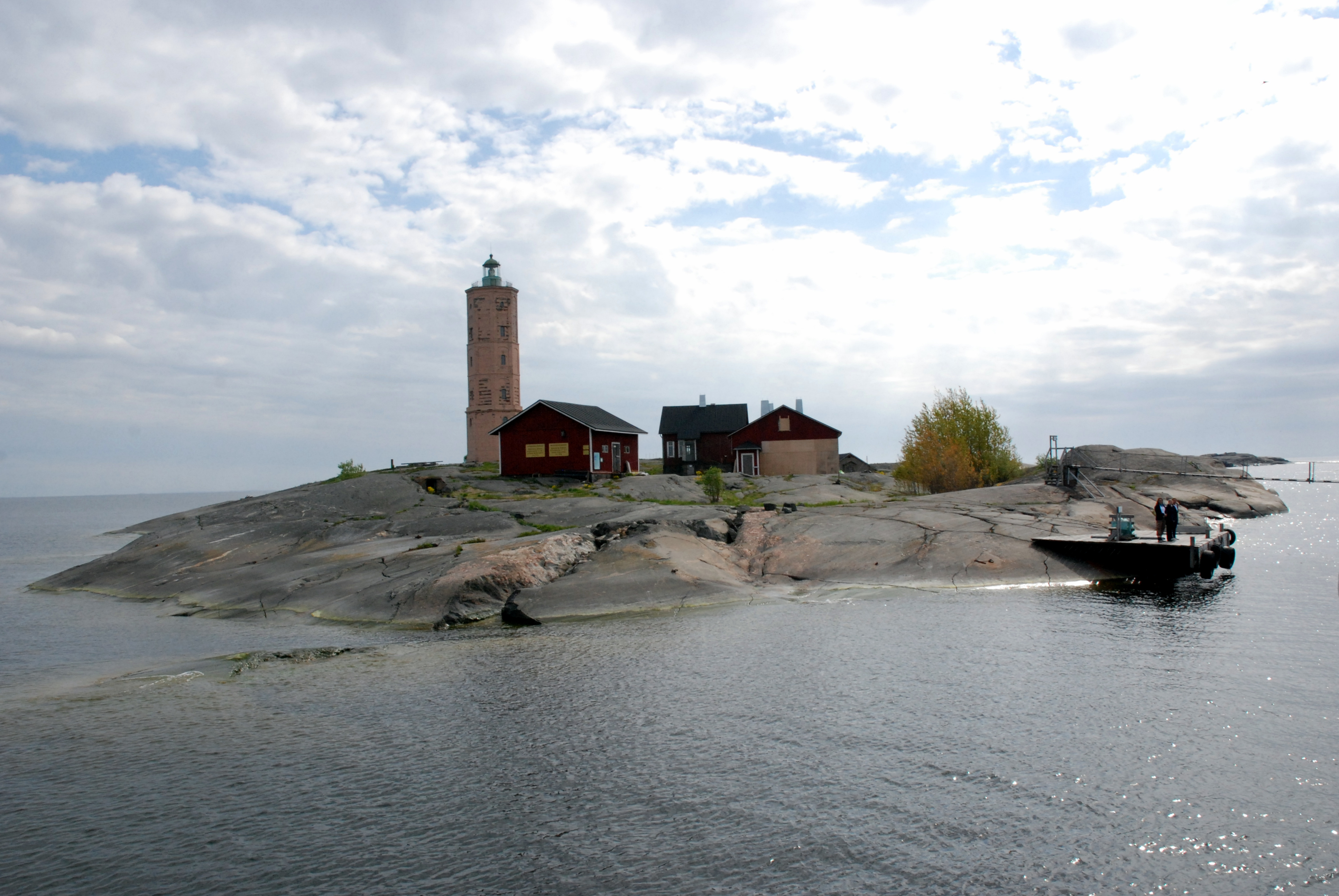
Jansson used Söderskär Lighthouse in Porvoo as the model for the book's lighthouse island.

The map at the front of Moominpappa at Sea gives a precise location for the island in the Gulf of Finland: 60°7′12″N 25°45′50″E. No island exists there in real life. Jansson is said to have used the real-life Söderskär Lighthouse in Porvoo as a model for the book's lighthouse island.

== Translations and adaptations ==
The book has been translated into languages including Arabic Bulgarian, Chinese, Czech, Danish, Dutch, English, Estonian, Finnish, French, German, Greek, Hungarian, Italian, Japanese, Latvian, Northern Sami, Norwegian, Polish, Russian, Slovak, Slovenian, Spanish, and Ukrainian.

The novel has been adapted into animation including episodes 25 and 26 of the 1990 television series Moomin, and episodes 23 ("Moominpappa's Island"), 24 ("Moominmamma's Mural"), and 25 ("Moomintroll and the Seahorses") of the 2019 television series Moominvalley.

In 1996, Gothenburg's Folkteatern put on a stage version of the book. The National Swedish Touring Theatre took on the production for its autumn season.

In 2010, a theatre adaptation of the book was staged in Shanghai. The Chinese producer wanted to modify the story to suit Chinese culture (such as not kissing in public); the senior producer Johan Storgård stated that no such changes were made. Svenska Dagbladet commented that similar "censorship" had appeared in a stage production at Helsinki's Swedish Theatre.

After Tove Jansson's death, the producer of the 1990 Moomin television series, Dennis Livson, planned to make a film adaptation of the novel, but Tove Jansson's niece Sophia Jansson did not give him permission.

== See also ==
- Moominvalley in November – the sombre final book in the series
