= Moomins =

Fictional characters created by Finnish author and illustrator Tove Jansson

The Moomins
- The Moomins, comic book cover by Tove Jansson. From left to right: (Sniff, Snufkin, Moominpappa, Moominmamma, Moomintroll (Moomin), the Mymble's daughter, The Groke, Snork Maiden and the Hattifatteners
- The Moomins and the Great Flood (1945); Comet in Moominland (1946); Finn Family Moomintroll (1948); The Exploits of Moominpappa (1950); The Book about Moomin, Mymble and Little My (1952); Moominsummer Madness (1954); Moominland Midwinter (1957); Who Will Comfort Toffle? (1960); Tales from Moominvalley (1962); Moominpappa at Sea (1965); Moominvalley in November (1970); The Dangerous Journey (1977); Villain in the Moominhouse (1980); Songs from the Moominvalley (1993)
- Author: Tove Jansson
- Original title: Mumintrollen
- Translator: To English: Elizabeth Portch, Thomas Warburton, Kingsley Hart, Ant O'Neill
- Illustrator: Tove Jansson
- Country: Finland
- Language: Finland Swedish
- Genre: Children's fantasy
- Publisher: Drawn & Quarterly, Macmillan, Farrar, Straus and Giroux, Schildts, Zangavar, Sort of Books
- Media type: Print, digital
- Website: www.moomin.com/en

The Moomins or Moomintrolls (Swedish: Mumintrollen, pronounced [ˈmʉːmɪnˌtrɔlːɛn]) are the central characters in a series of novels, short stories, picture books, and a comic strip by the Finnish writer and illustrator Tove Jansson, originally published in Swedish by the Finnish publisher Schildts. They are a family of white, round fairy-tale characters with large snouts that make them resemble the hippopotamus. However, despite this resemblance, the Moomin family are trolls who live in a house in Moominvalley.

Between 1945 and 1993, Jansson wrote a series of nine books, and created five picture books and a long-running comic strip. The Moomins have inspired numerous television series, films, music, theatre productions, video games, and theme parks. In popular culture, the Moomins have appeared on a wide range of merchandise, sold in shops around the world, and as a livery for some Finnair aircraft.

== Etymology ==
There are two different stories of how the term moomintroll was invented.

On one occasion, the books' author, the artist Tove Jansson (born in 1914), explained that the term mumintroll was originally coined during her "earliest childhood" by her uncle. To deter the young Jansson from taking food from his pantry, the uncle told her that it was inhabited by "cold moomintrolls", which would come out of the corners and rub their noses against Jansson if she came to steal food.

In a 1973 letter to Paul Ariste, an Estonian linguist, Jansson wrote that she had created the word moomintroll to express something soft: She came up with an ad hoc Swedish word mumintroll because, in her opinion, the consonant sound of m in particular conveys a sensation of softness. As an artist, Jansson gave the Moomins a shape that also expresses softness, as opposed to flabbiness.

== Approach ==
=== Characters ===
The Moomin stories concern several eccentric and oddly-shaped characters, some of whom are related to each other. The central family consists of Moominpappa, Moominmamma and Moomintroll.

Other characters, such as the Snork Maiden, Hemulens, Sniff, Snufkin, and Little My are accepted into or attach themselves to the family group from time to time, despite generally living separate lives in Moominvalley, the setting of the series, where the Moomin family decides to live at the end of The Moomins and the Great Flood.

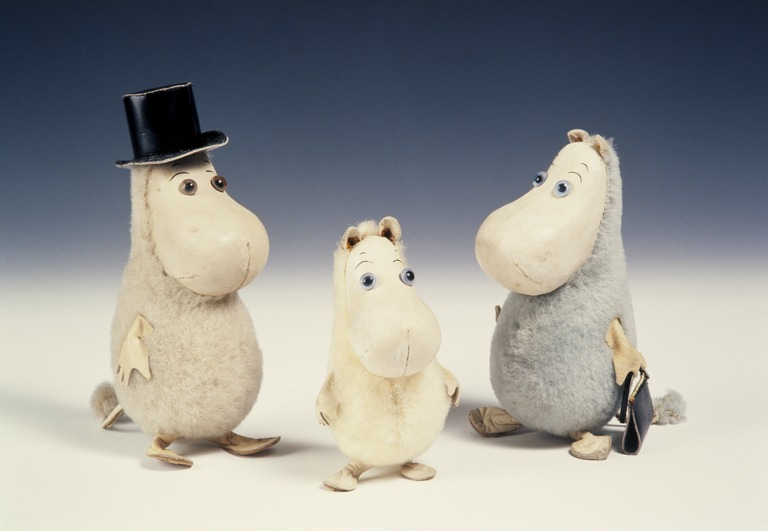
Finnish Moomin toys from the 1950s

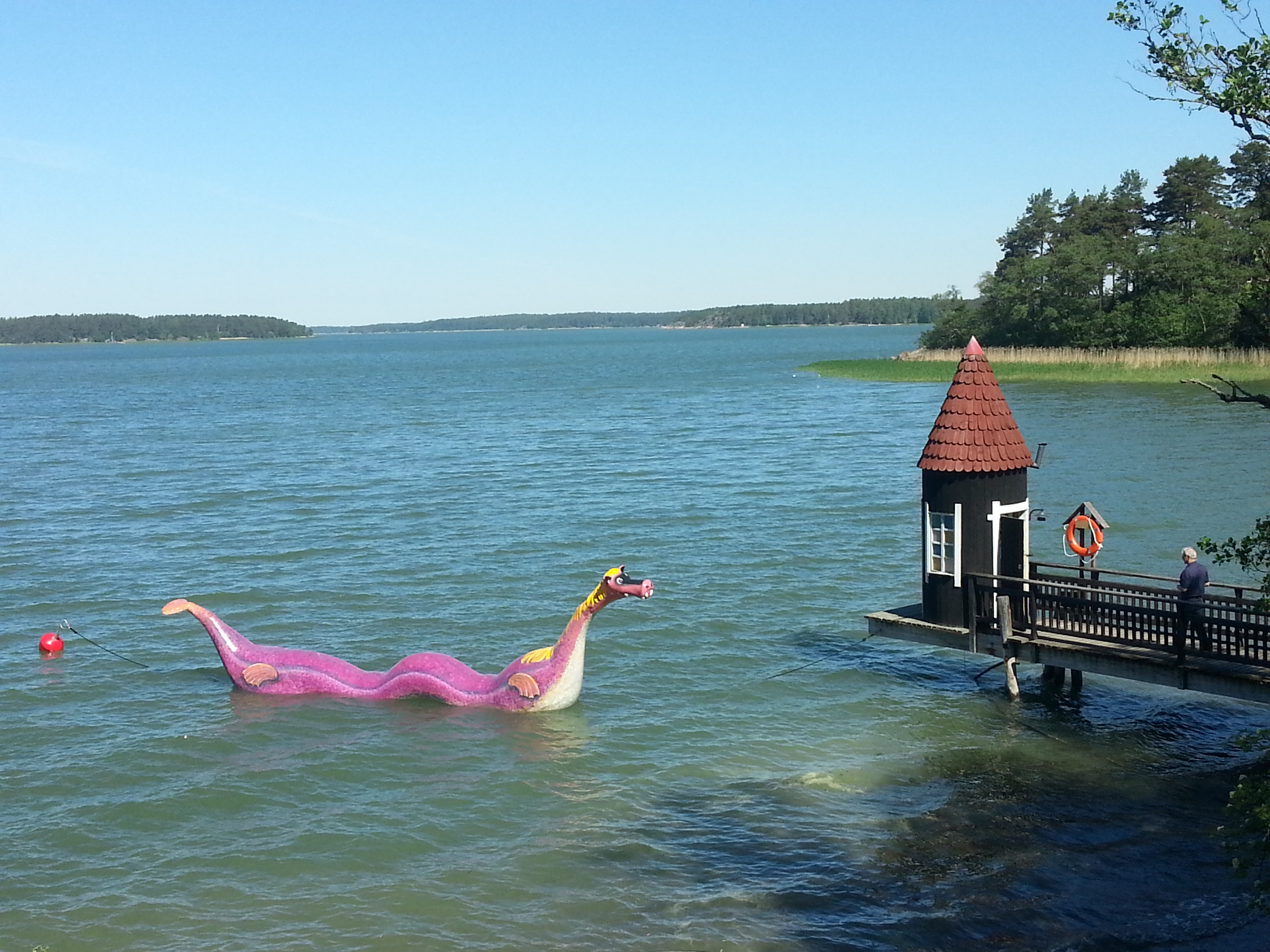
Edward the Booble and the bathing hut, at Moominworld

=== Biographical interpretation ===
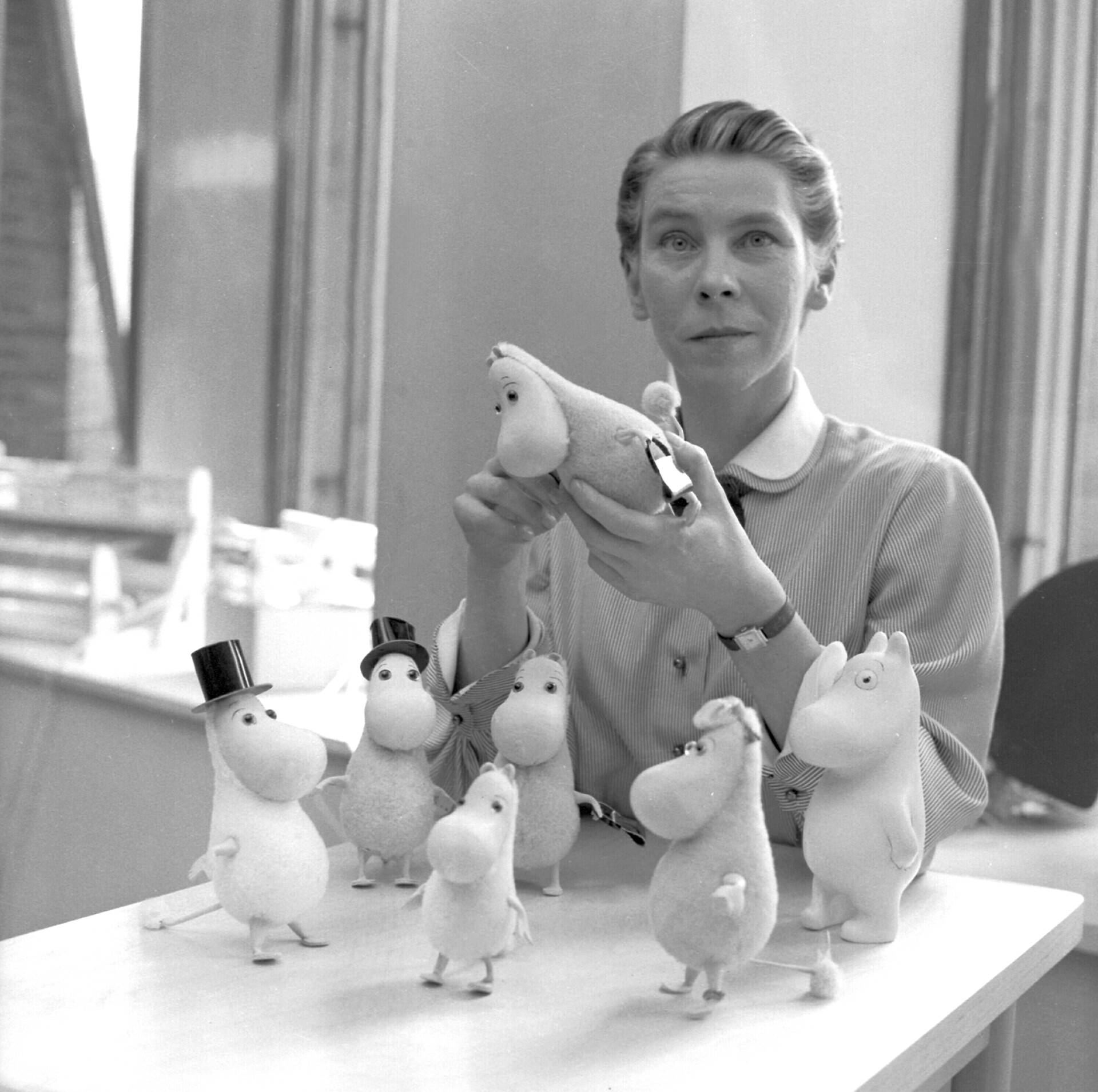
Tove Jansson with Moomin dolls

Critics have interpreted various Moomin characters as being inspired by real people, especially members of the author's family, with Tove Jansson having spoken in interviews about the backgrounds of her characters and possible models for them. The first two books about the Moomins (The Moomins and the Great Flood and Comet in Moominland) were published in 1945 and 1946 respectively, and deal with natural disasters; they were influenced by the upheavals of war and Jansson's depression during the war years.

Tove Jansson's life partner was the graphic artist Tuulikki Pietilä, whose personality inspired the character Too-Ticky in Moominland Midwinter. The names Tofslan and Vifslan (for Thingumy and Bob) were the pet names of Jansson and her theatre director lover Vivica Bandler, while the name Mymlan (The Mymble) echoes the slang verb mymla, "to have sex": she has at least 30 children.

Moomintroll and Little My have been seen as psychological self-portraits of the artist. The Moomins, generally speaking, relate strongly to Jansson's own family – they were bohemian, lived close to nature and were very tolerant towards diversity. Moominpappa and Moominmamma are often seen as portraits of Jansson's parents Viktor Jansson and Signe Hammarsten-Jansson. Most of Jansson's characters are on the verge of melancholy, such as the always formal Hemulen, or the strange Hattifatteners, who travel in concerted, ominous groups. Jansson uses the differences between the characters' philosophies to express her views.

=== Goals ===
Jansson's biographer, Tuula Karjalainen, writes that Jansson created Moominvalley as "an escape from the horrors of the Winter War and into the safety of childhood". She imbued the Moomin characters with multiple aspects of her way of thinking, including, according to posthumanist and queer analysis, a wide diversity of species including non-human life forms and a range of sexual and gender preferences. For instance, the dress-wearing Hemulens may be male or female. Commentators have noted that the Moomin family accepts people for themselves, something that queer readers have respected.

Jansson commented in a 1983 lecture that she had "tried to tell [a story] about a very happy family. The Moomin family is happy in such an obvious way that they themselves don't even realize it. They are comfortable with each other and give each other freedom. Freedom to be alone, to think in one's way, to keep one's secrets until one is ready to disclose them. Not to give each other a bad conscience and to be able to experience responsibility as something fun and not just a duty."

=== Reception ===
The reception of the first two Moomin books was lukewarm at first; the second book received more attention than its predecessor, but sales figures were still poor. The third book, Finn Family Moomintroll, which was the first to be translated into English, became the first international bestseller.

== Works by Tove Jansson ==
=== Novels ===
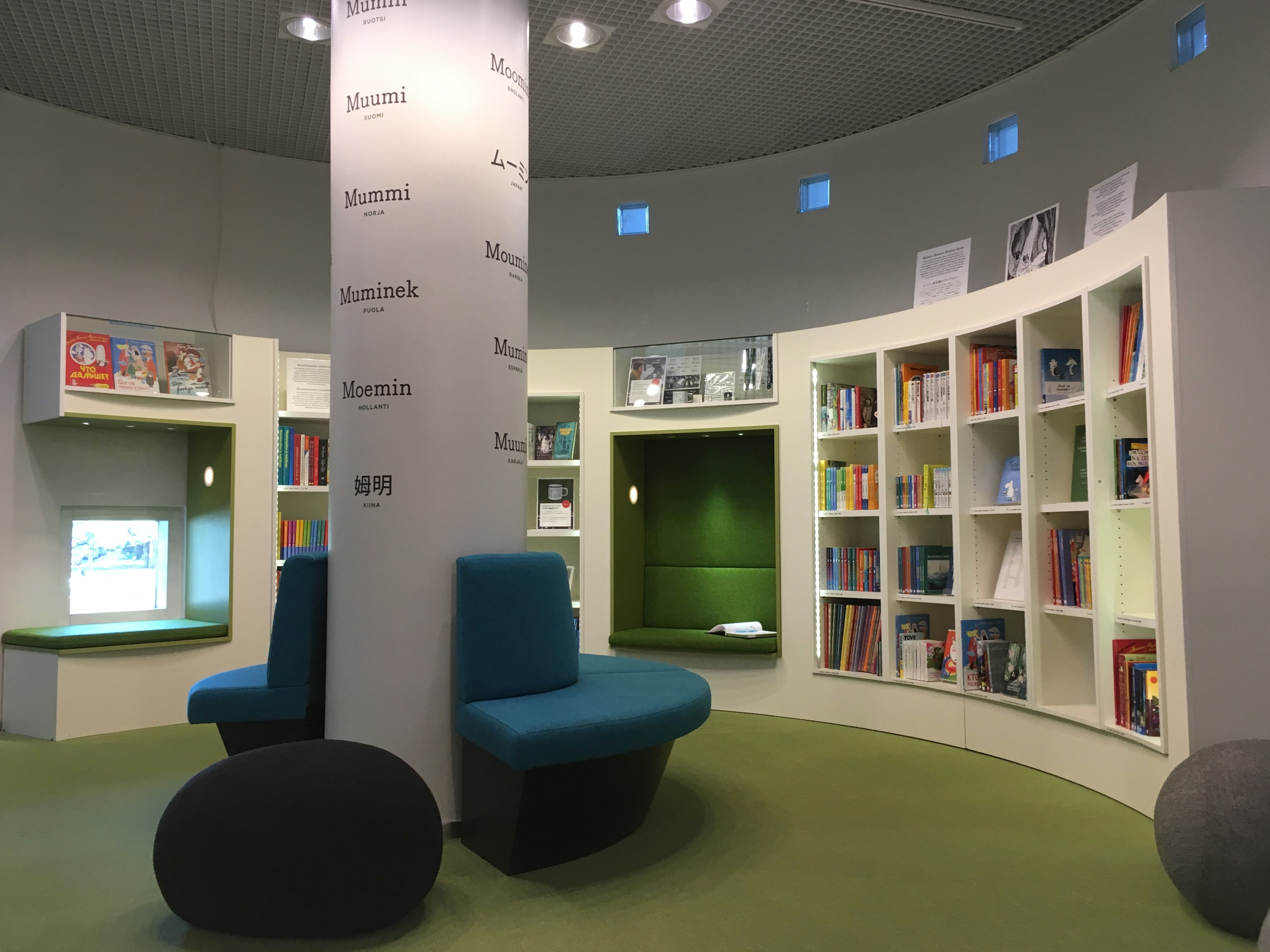
The Moomin books and Tove Jansson's biographies at the Moomin Museum in Tampere, Finland

The novels in the series, in order, all by Jansson, are:

1. The Moomins and the Great Flood (Originally: Småtrollen och den stora översvämningen, "The small trolls and the great flood") – 1945.
2. Comet in Moominland (Originally: Kometjakten/Kometen kommer, "The comet hunt"/"The comet is coming") – 1946.
3. Finn Family Moomintroll, Some editions: The Happy Moomins –(Originally: Trollkarlens hatt, "The wizard's hat") – 1948.
4. The Exploits of Moominpappa, Some editions: Moominpappa's Memoirs (Originally: Muminpappans bravader/Muminpappans memoarer, "Moominpappa's achievements"/"Moominpappa's memoirs") – 1950.
5. Moominsummer Madness (Originally: Farlig midsommar, "Dangerous midsummer") – 1954.
6. Moominland Midwinter (Originally: Trollvinter, "Troll winter") – 1957.
7. Tales from Moominvalley (Originally: Det osynliga barnet, "The invisible child") – 1962 (Short stories).
8. Moominpappa at Sea (Originally: Pappan och havet, "The father and the sea") – 1965.
9. Moominvalley in November (Originally: Sent i november, "Late in November") – 1970 (In which the Moomin family is absent).

Eight English-translated Moomin books published by Macmillan

All of the novels in the main series except The Moomins and the Great Flood were translated and published in English between 1951 and 1971. This first book was eventually translated into English in 2005 by David McDuff and published by Schildts of Finland for the 60th anniversary of the series. A later 2012 version of the same translation, featuring Jansson's new preface to the 1991 Scandinavian printing, was published in Britain by Sort of Books.

=== Picture books ===
There are five Moomin picture books by Jansson:

1. The Book about Moomin, Mymble and Little My (Originally: Hur gick det sen?) – 1952.
2. Who Will Comfort Toffle? (Originally: Vem ska trösta knyttet?) – 1960.
3. The Dangerous Journey (Originally: Den farliga resan) – 1977.
4. Skurken i Muminhuset (English: Villain in the Moominhouse) – 1980
5. Visor från Mumindalen (English: Songs from Moominvalley) – 1993 (No English translation published).

The first official translation of Villain in the Moominhouse by Tove Jansson historian Ant O'Neill was premiered in a reading at the ArchWay With Words literary festival on 25 September 2017.

The books and comic strips have been translated from their original Swedish and English respectively into many languages. The Book about Moomin, Mymble and Little My has been adapted for digital devices by Filmkompaniet.

=== Comic strips by Tove and Lars Jansson ===
Moomin comic strips first appeared in 1947, in the children's section of the Ny Tid newspaper. These were introduced to English readers in 1954 in the London newspaper The Evening News. Tove Jansson drew and wrote all the strips alone until 1959, then shared the workload with her brother Lars Jansson until 1961, when Lars Jansson took over the job completely - he worked on the strip until production ceased in 1975.

Drawn & Quarterly, a Canadian graphic novel publisher, released reprints of all The Evening News strips created by both Tove and Lars Jansson beginning in October 2006. The first five volumes, Moomin: The Complete Tove Jansson Comic Strip have been published, whilst the sixth volume, published in May 2011, began Moomin: The Complete Lars Jansson Comic Strip. The 2015 publication Moomin: The Deluxe Anniversary Edition collected all of Tove's work.

In the 1990s, a comic book version of Moomin was produced in Scandinavia after Dennis Livson and Lars Jansson's animated series was shown on television. Neither Tove nor Lars Jansson had any involvement in these comic books; however, in the wake of the series, two new Moomin comic strips were launched under the artistic and content oversight of Lars and his daughter, Sophia Jansson-Zambra. Sophia now provides sole oversight for the strips.

== Music ==
The Moomin novels describe the musical activities of the Moomins, particularly those of Snufkin and his harmonica with its "trills" and "twiddles".

=== Original songs ===
The Moomin Voices CD release from 2003, arranged by Mika Pohjola, in Swedish containing Tove Jansson's original Moomin songs. A Finnish version was released in 2005.

This music was heard outside Moominvalley after they went live on the stage in Stockholm. Director Vivica Bandler told Jansson in 1959: "Listen, here the people want songs".

Helsinki based pianist and composer Erna Tauro was commissioned by Bandler to write the songs to Jansson's lyrics. The first collection consisted of Six Moomin Songs (Sex muminvisor): Moomintroll's Song (Mumintrollets visa), Little My's Song (Lilla Mys visa), Mrs. Fillyjonk's Song (Fru Filifjonks sång), Theatre Rat Emma's Words of Wisdom (Teaterråttan Emmas visdomsord), Misabel's Lament (Misans klagolåt) and Final Song (Slutsång).

The songs by Jansson and Tauro remained scattered after their initial release. The first recording of the complete collection was made in 2003 by composer and arranger Mika Pohjola on the Moomin Voices CD (Muminröster in Swedish), as a memorial tribute to Jansson. Tauro had died in June 1993 and some of Jansson's last lyrics were composed by Pohjola in cooperation with Jansson's heirs. Pohjola arranged all the songs for vocal ensemble and chamber orchestra. All voices were sung by Åland native vocalist, Johanna Grüssner. The same recording has been released in a Finnish version in 2005, Muumilauluja. The Finnish lyrics were translated by Kirsi Kunnas and Vexi Salmi.

The Swedish and Finnish recordings of Moomin Voices, and their respective musical scores, have been used as course material at Berklee College of Music in Boston, Massachusetts. The Moomin Voices Live Band (aka. Muumilauluja-bändi) is dedicated to exclusively performing the original lyrics and unaltered stories by Jansson. This band is led by Pohjola on piano, with vocalists Mirja Mäkelä and Eeppi Ursin.

=== Musical interpretations ===
A Moomin opera was written in 1974 by the Finnish composer Ilkka Kuusisto; Jansson designed the costumes.

Musicscapes from Moominvalley is a four-part work based on the Moomin compositions of composer and producer Heikki Mäenpää. It was created on the basis of the original Moomin works for the Tampere Art Museum.

The Icelandic singer Björk composed and performed the title song ("The Comet Song") for the 2010 Finnish film Moomins and the Comet Chase. The lyrics were written by the Icelandic writer Sjón.

== Adaptations ==
=== Films ===
Two feature films re-use the footage of the Polish-Austrian series: Moomin and Midsummer Madness had its release in 2008, and in 2010 the Moomins appeared in the first Nordic 3-D film production, with the title song by Björk, in Moomins and the Comet Chase. The animated film titled Moomins on the Riviera is based on Moomin comic strip story Moomin on the Riviera and was first released on 10 October 2014 in Finland and made its premiere on 11 October 2014 at BFI London Film Festival in United Kingdom. In an October 2014 blog article at Screendaily, Sophia Jansson states that the film's "artistic team has made an effort to be true to the original drawings and the original text".

In October 2025, a new animated film was announced to be the first Moomin film produced in the United States. It will be produced by Annapurna Pictures and written and directed by Rebecca Sugar.

- Mūmin (Moomin), 1971 Japanese traditional animation film
- Mūmin (Moomin), 1972 Japanese traditional animation half-hour film
- Vem ska trösta knyttet?, 1980 Swedish traditional animation half-hour film of Who Will Comfort Toffle?
- Shlyapa Volshebnika (Magician's Hat), 1980–83 Soviet Union cutout animation serial film of Finn Family Moomintroll, different staff and aesthetic from the 1978 serial
- Tanoshii Mūmin Ikka: Mūmindani no Suisei (Comet in Moominland), 1992 Dutch and Japanese-produced traditional anime feature film made in Japan, a prequel to the 1990–91 series
- Hur gick det sen? (What Happened Next?), 1993 Swedish short animation film of The Book about Moomin, Mymble and Little My
- Փոքրիկ տրոլների կյանքից (P'vok'rik trolneri kyank'its', From the Life of the Little Trolls), 2008 Armenian short animation film based on The Last Dragon in the World (Historien om den sista draken i världen)
- Moomins on the Riviera, 2014 French hand-drawn animated feature film, with a plot line taken from the comic strip.

=== TV series and derivatives ===
The story of the Moomins has been made into television series on many occasions by various groups. Possibly the best known is a Japanese–Dutch collaboration, that has also produced a feature-length film. However, there are two Soviet serials, puppet animation Mumi-troll (Moomintroll) and cutout animation Shlyapa Volshebnika (Magician's Hat) of three parts each, and the Polish–Austrian puppet animation TV series, The Moomins, which was broadcast and became popular in an edited form in the United Kingdom in the 1980s.

- Die Muminfamilie (The Moomin Family) 1959 West German marionette TV series, and its 1960 sequel Sturm im Mumintal (Storm in Moominvalley)
- Mūmin (Moomin), 1969–70 Japanese anime TV series
- Mumintrollet (Moomintroll), 1969 Swedish-language suit actor TV series produced by Sveriges Radio (Swedish national radio company)
- Shin Mūmin (New Moomin), 1972 Japanese anime TV series, remake of the 1969 series by the staff of its latter half
- Mumindalen (Moominvalley), 1973 Swedish suit actor TV series based on Moominland Midwinter
- Mumi-troll (Moomintroll), 1978 Soviet Union stop motion serial film of Comet in Moominland
- Opowiadania Muminków (The Moomins), 1977–82 Austrian, German and Polish-produced "Fuzzy-Felt" stop motion TV series made in Poland. The series has been re-compiled a number of times in other formats:
  - Moomin and Midsummer Madness, 2008 Finnish-produced compilation movie of the TV series
  - Moomins and the Comet Chase, 2010 Finnish-produced 3-D film compiled and converted from the 1977–82 series
  - Moomins and the Winter Wonderland, 2017, from the TV series.
  - The Moomins, 2010 Finnish-produced high-definition video version of the 1977–82 series
- Tanoshii Mūmin Ikka (Moomin), 1990–91 Dutch, Finnish and Japanese-produced traditional anime TV series made in Japan
  - Tanoshii Mūmin Ikka: Bōken Nikki (Delightful Moomin Family: Adventure Diary), 1991–92 Dutch and Japanese-produced traditional anime TV series made in Japan, a continuation of the 1990–91 series
- Moominvalley, 2019 Finnish and British-produced TV series, directed by Oscar-winner Steve Box. A crowdfunded campaign was made on April 19, 2017 to make a new "TV-series Moominvalley". Archived from the original on 2017-03-29. by the Finnish company "Gutsy Animations". It successfully passed the campaign threshold.
Screenshot from the 1969 television series of Moomintroll with a rifle. Jansson strongly disliked the controversial content of the series.

Moominpappa and Moominmamma in the 1978–82 Polish-Austrian series.

The Moomins, from the 1990 television series. From left to right, Sniff, Moominmamma, Moominpappa, Moomintroll (Moomin) and Little My.

=== Theatre ===
Several stage productions have been made from the Moomin series, including some that Jansson herself was involved in. The first production was a 1949 theatrical version of Comet in Moominland performed at Helsinki's Svenska Teater. It was directed by Jansson's friend and former lover, Vivica Bandler, who insisted that the Moomins should speak the Finland Swedish style of Swedish as spoken in Helsinki.

In the early 1950s, Jansson collaborated on Moomin-themed children's plays with Bandler. By 1958, Jansson became directly involved in theatre as Lilla Teater produced Troll i kulisserna (Troll in the wings), a Moomin play with lyrics by Jansson and music composed by Erna Tauro. The production was a success, and later performances were held in Sweden and Norway, including at the Malmö Opera and Music Theatre in 2011.

Mischief and Mystery in Moominvalley, a production created by Get Lost and Found which included puppetry and a giant pop-up book set, toured the UK from 2018, with runs at the Southbank Centre, Kew Gardens, and the Manchester Literature Festival.

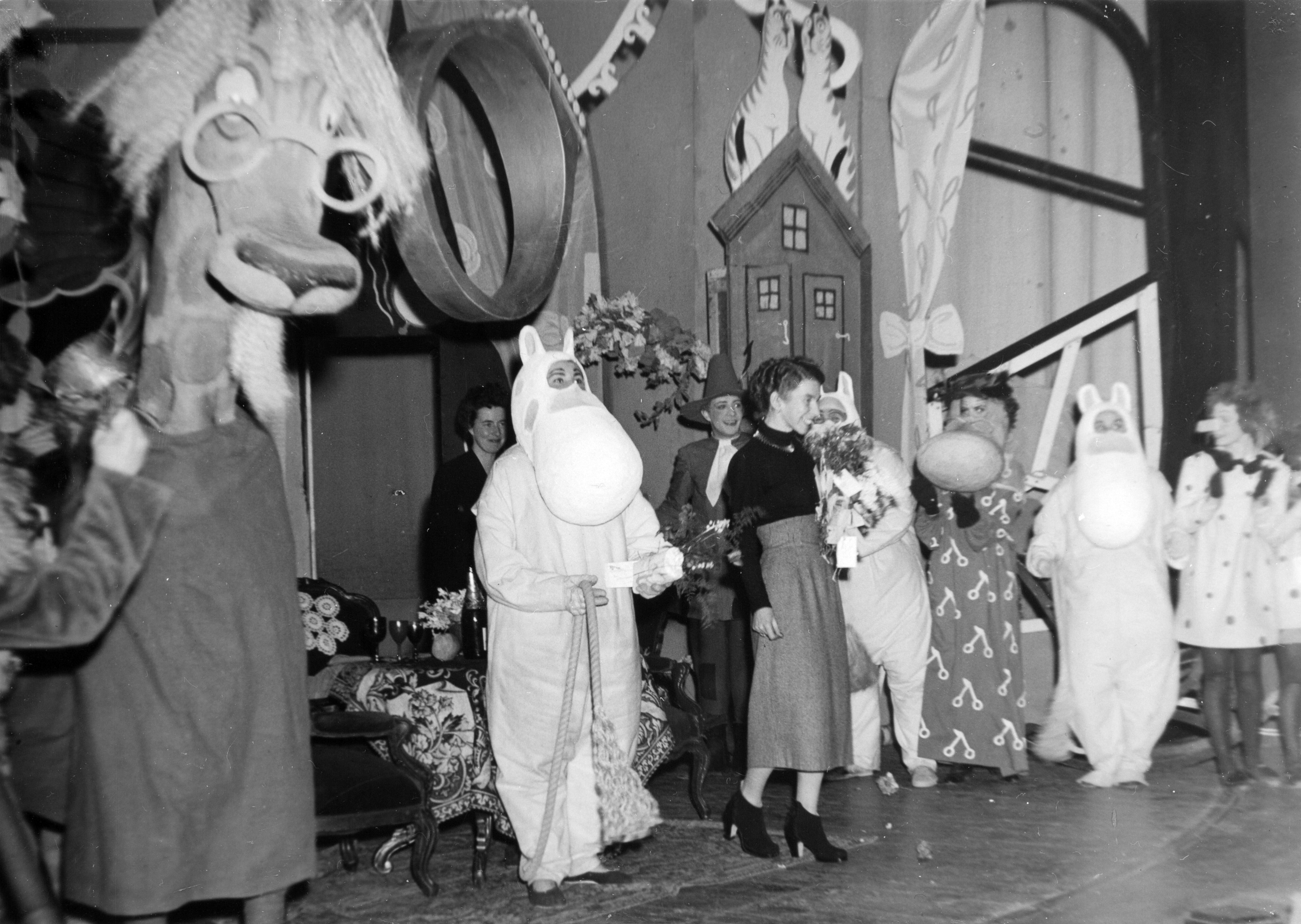
Jansson comes on stage with the Moomins in 1949

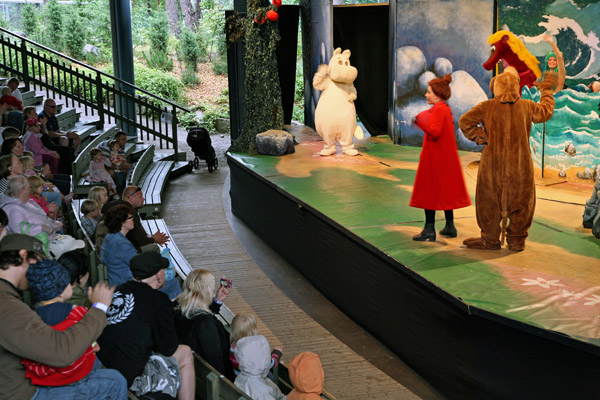
Moomins Theatre show

=== Video games ===
Box art of Moomin's Tale (2000) for Game Boy Color, developed by Sunsoft

In 1997, Muumit ja Taikurin hattu (The Moomins and the Hobgoblin's Hat) was developed by Norsk Strek AS and published by WSOY, later Nordic Softsales. It was only released for the PC.

In 2000, Moomin's Tale, developed and published by Sunsoft, was released for Game Boy Color. The game is based on the 1990 TV series, where Moomintroll is the game's protagonist. The player goes through six different stories throughout the duration of the game.

Two video games were released for Nintendo DS, one exclusive to Japan. Moomin Tani no Okurimono was released in Japan in 2009.

In 2021, the music-themed adventure game Snufkin: Melody of Moominvalley was announced. The game features Snufkin as the protagonist, as he attempts to restore harmony within Moominvalley. The game is developed by Norwegian-based indie game company Hyper Games. The game's soundtrack features music from Icelandic post-rock band Sigur Rós, taken from their 2002 album ( ). The game was released for Steam and Nintendo Switch in 2024. The game's spiritual successor, Moomintroll: Winter's Warmth, was released in 2026.

In 2026, the upcoming point-and-click adventure Moomin: Midsummer Madness by Shochiku Games and Crossbridge was announced. The game will be released for Steam, Nintendo Switch, and Nintendo Switch 2.

== In popular culture ==
The Moomin Boom (muumibuumi in Finnish) started in the 1990s, when Dennis Livson and Lars Jansson produced a 104-part animation series in Japan named Tales from Moominvalley, which was followed by a full-length movie Comet in Moominland. Moomin books had always been steady bestsellers in Finland and Sweden, but the animation started a new Moomin madness both in Finland and abroad, especially in Japan, where they are the official mascots of the Daiei chain of shopping centers. The Moomins did not find their way to the United States during Jansson's lifetime (with the exception of Hawaii, where the 1990s series was broadcast) as the content and philosophy of the works were considered too unconventional for American child-rearing culture at the time.

A large merchandising industry was built around the Moomin characters, covering everything from coffee cups and T-shirts to plastic models. Even the former Finnish President Tarja Halonen has been known to wear a Moomin watch. New Moomin comic books and comic strips were published. Moomins were used to advertise Finland abroad: the Helsinki–Vantaa International Airport was decorated with Moomin images and Finnair decorated two of its McDonnell Douglas MD-11s on routes to Japan with Moomin designs in 2006. In 2023, Finnair also decorated two of its Airbus A350-900s with two of Moomin characters, Moomintroll and Snork Maiden to celebrate its 100th anniversary.

The Jansson family has kept the rights to the Moomins. Artistic control is now in the hands of Lars Jansson's daughter, Sophia Jansson-Zambra. Wanting to keep the control over Moomins, the family has turned down offers from The Walt Disney Company.

As of 2017, the Moomin brand is estimated to have a yearly retail value of €700 million per year.

In honor of the 80th anniversary of the Moomins, an exhibition called Tove Jansson and the Moomins: The Door Is Always Open—offering an in-depth look at Jansson's career, life stages and the world of the Moomins through texts, archival materials, books and events—opened at the Brooklyn Public Library in June 2025. Despite the exhibition's success, the reception was not entirely without problems: the appearance of the character Stinky caused a controversy due to possible suspicions of racism, leading to the character's removal from the exhibition.

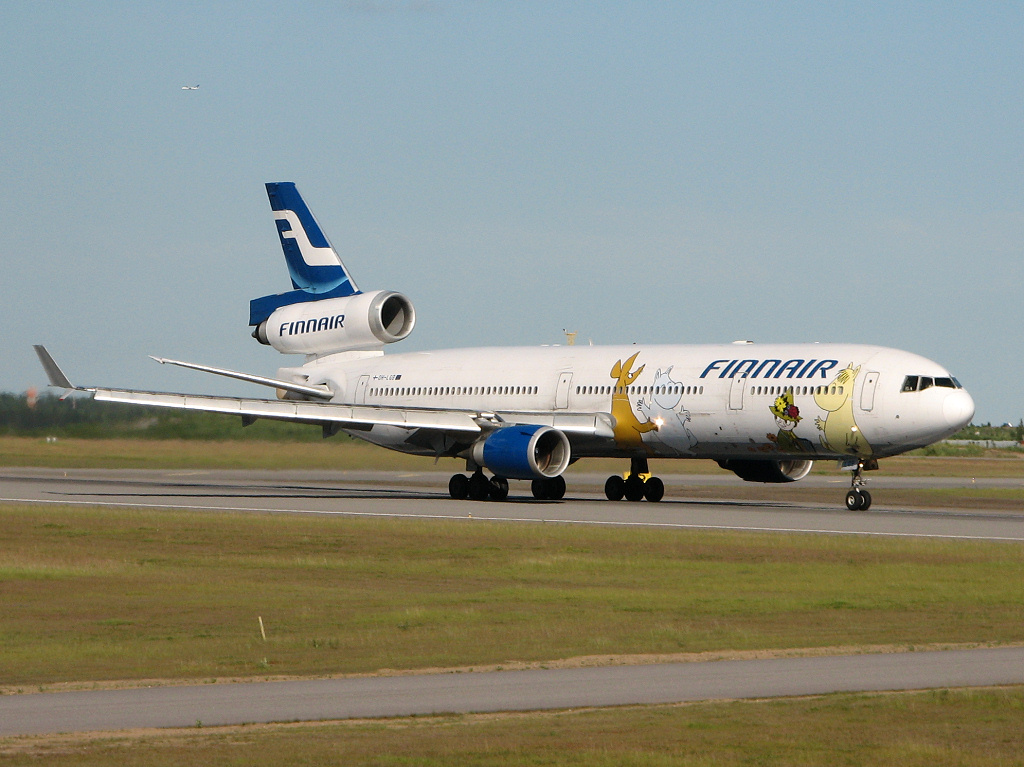
Finnair McDonnell Douglas MD-11 serving the Japanese route decorated with Moomin characters

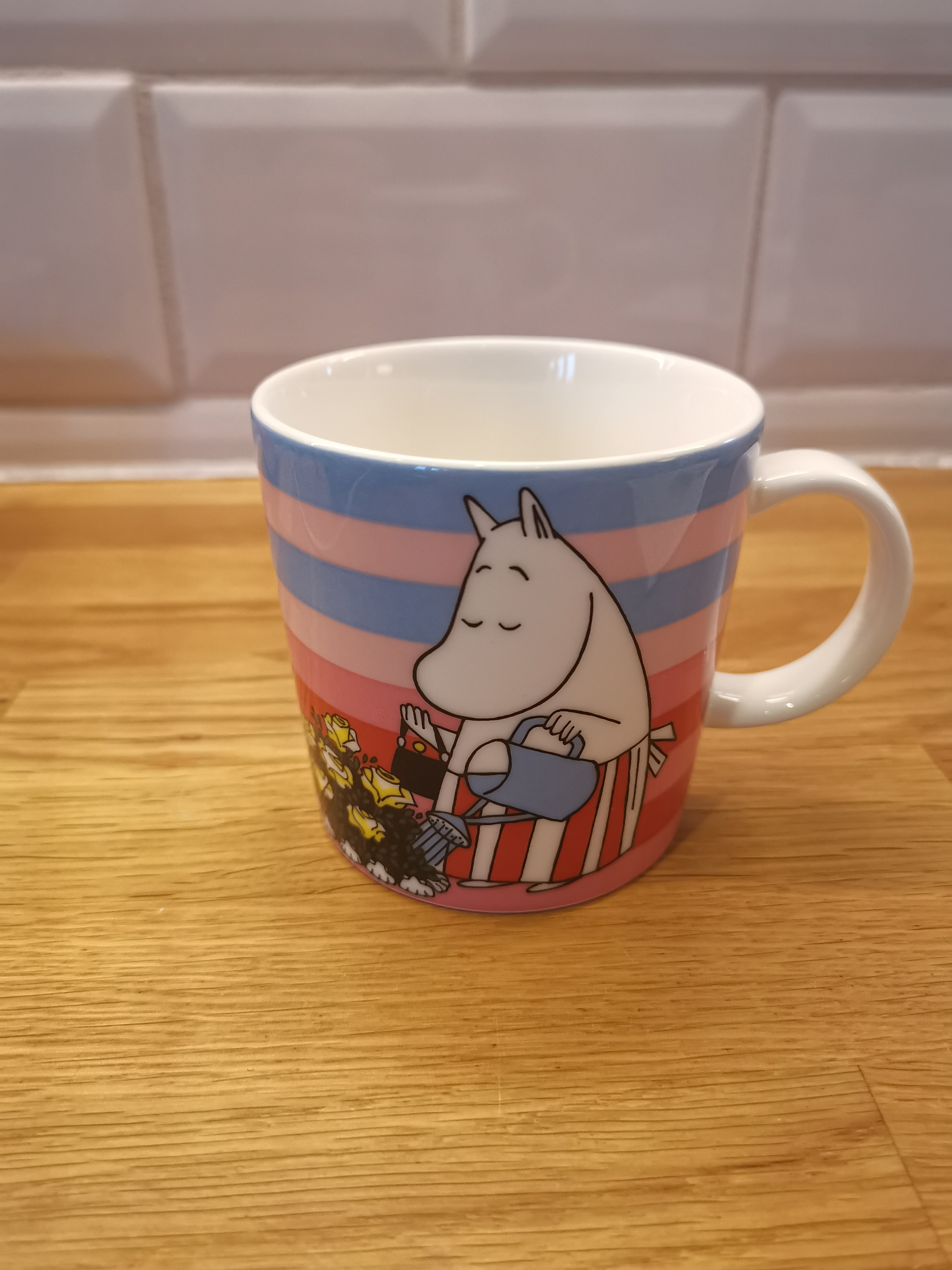
Moominmamma in the Moomin-themed mug

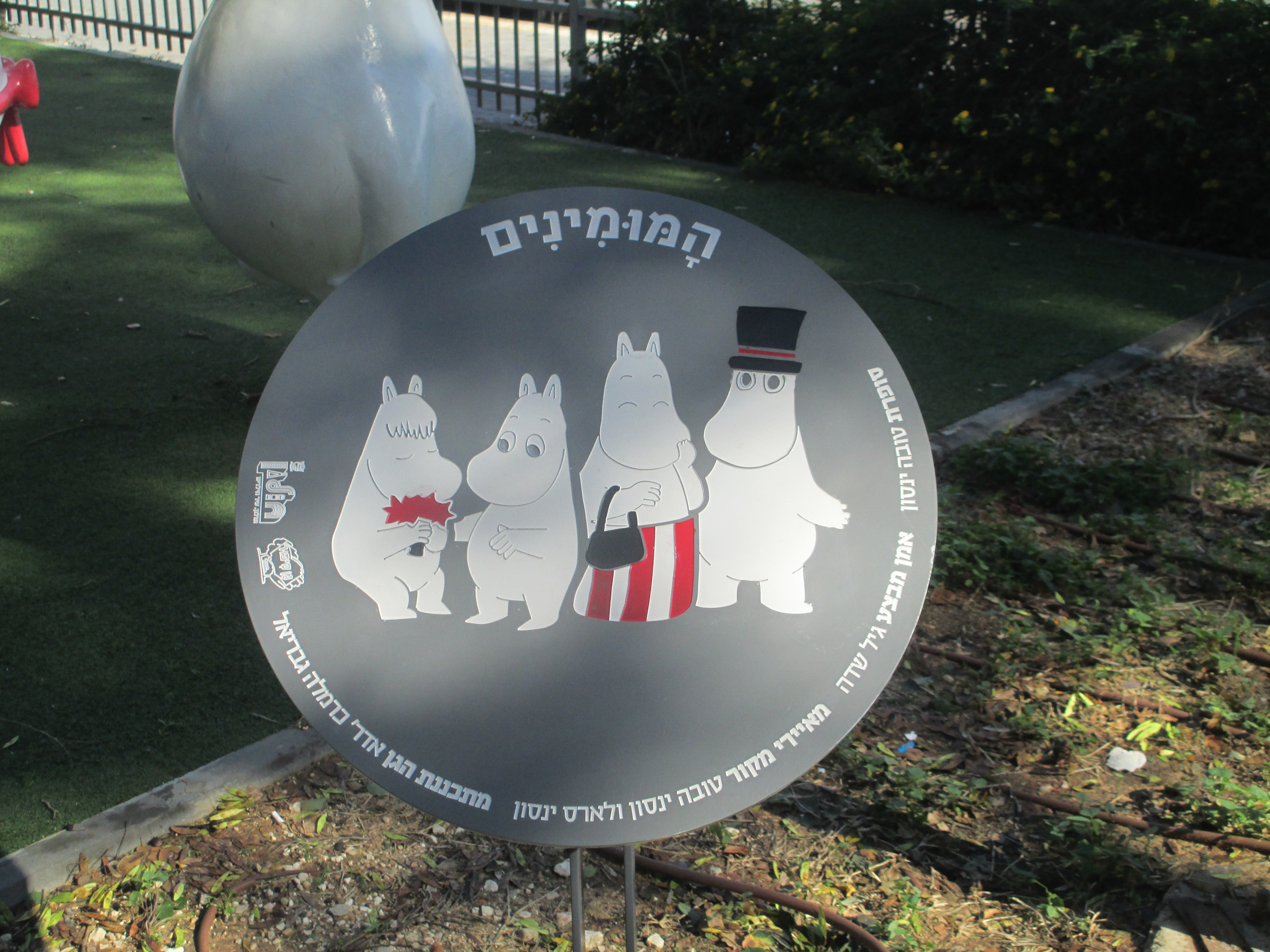
Moomins Garden in Holon, Israel

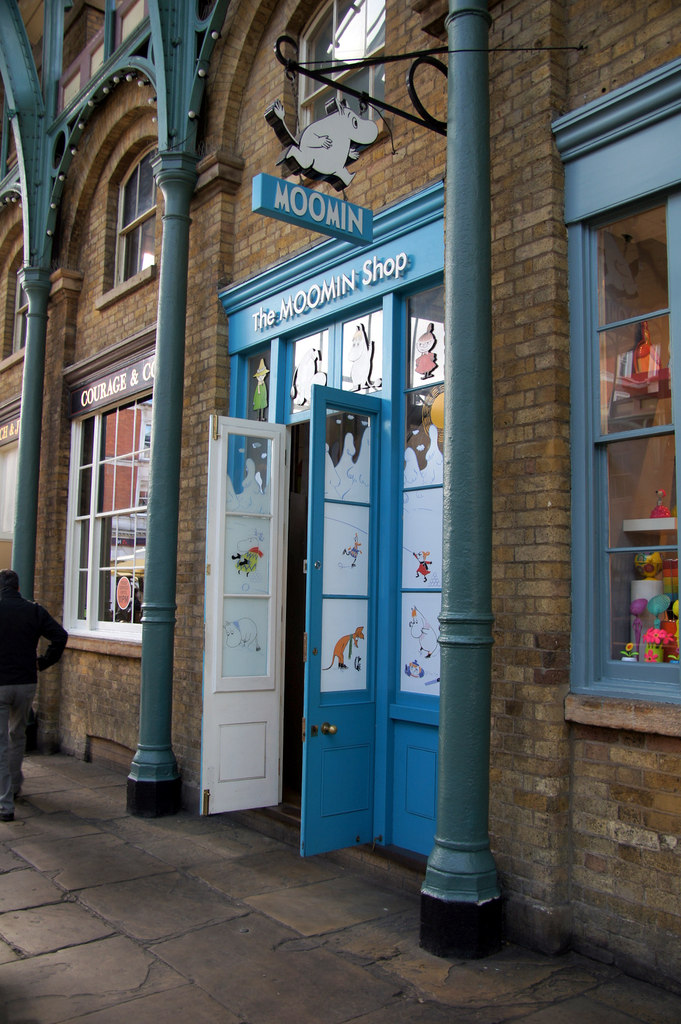
The Moomin Shop in Covent Garden, Westminster, UK

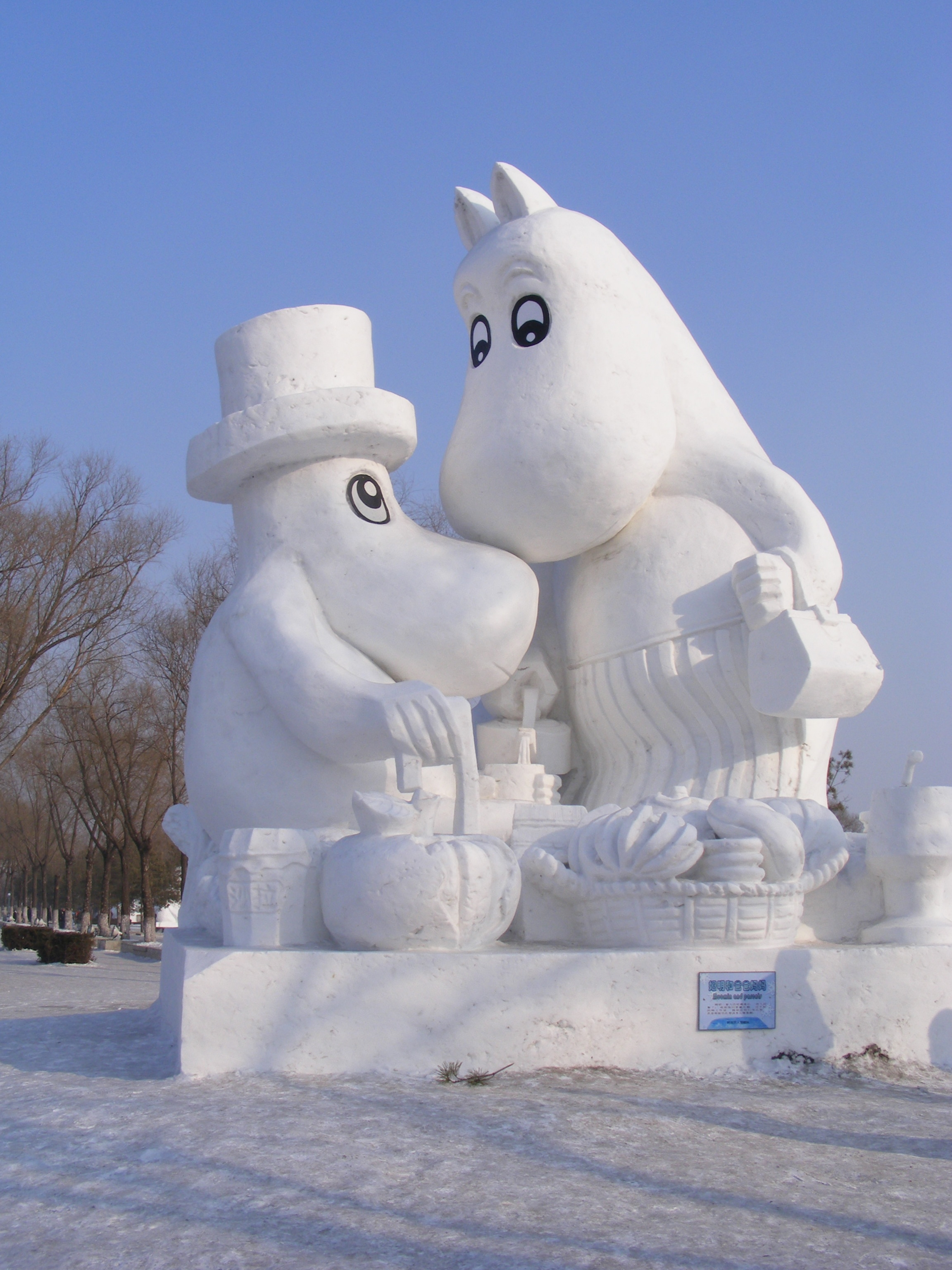
Moomin snow sculpture in Harbin International Ice and Snow Sculpture Festival

== See also ==
- Children's fantasy
- Culture of Finland

== Sources ==
- Karjalainen, Tuula (2014). Tove Jansson: Work and Love. Penguin Books. ISBN 978-1846148491.
