= Moomin mugs =

Series of collectible mugs with Moomin characters

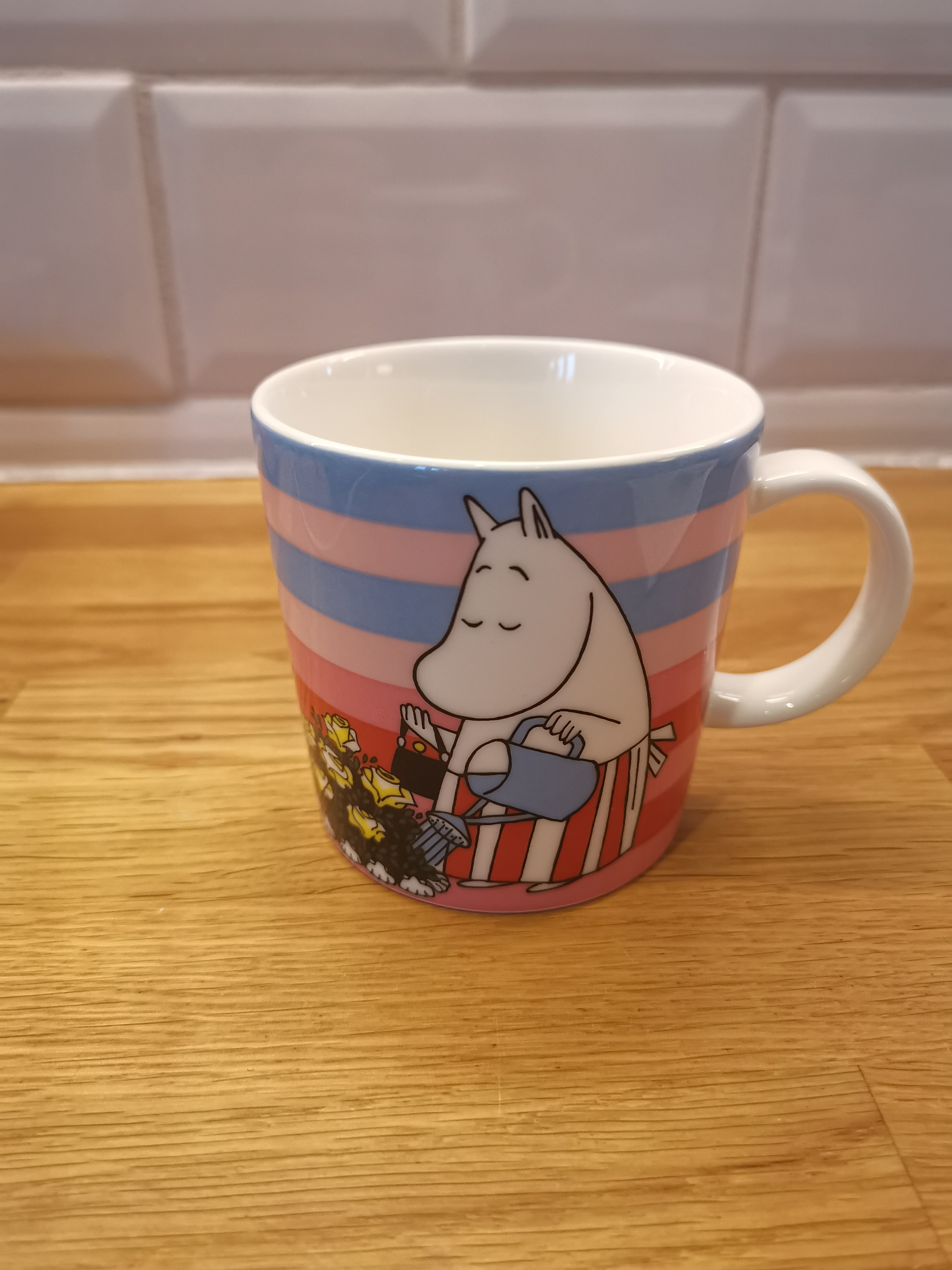
A mug with a drawing of Moominmamma watering plants

Moomin mugs are a series of collectible mugs with Moomin characters, manufactured by the Finnish ceramics brand Arabia. The mugs are designed by Tove Slotte, with the images based on original drawings by cartoonists Tove and Lars Jansson. The mug itself is a 0.3 litres (0.066 imp gal; 0.079 US gal) ceramics mug of the series "Teema", designed by Kaj Franck in the late 1970s.

The first Moomin tableware was produced by Arabia in the 1950s, and the current Moomin mugs were introduced in 1990. Three to five different new mugs are put on the market annually, including limited edition items for summer and Christmas seasons. Moomin mugs are popular collectibles, especially in the Nordic countries. The most valuable ones are the limited edition mugs made for the Fazer café and the Stockmann department store. The 2004 Fazer special mug was sold in December 2012 at online auction for more than 26,000 Swedish krona ($4,000). In 2021, the "Swimming with Seashells" mug sold for a record sum 236,478 Swedish krona ($27,500).

== Sources ==
- Moomin Mugs 1990 - 2019
- http://www.arabia.fi/eng/products/moomin-mug-listing
- Ninny, the Invisible Child, finally gets her own Moomin mug by Arabia!
- https://www.moomin.com/en/mugs/
