= Moses Pergament =

Finnish-Swedish composer and conductor (1893–1977)

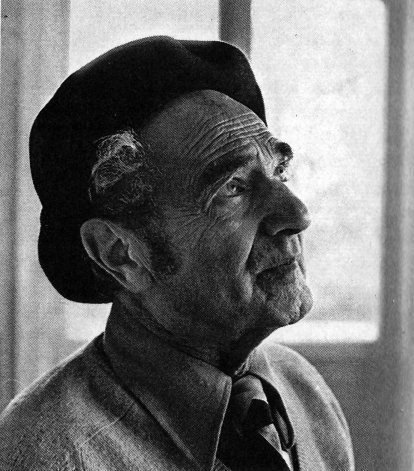
- Pergament in 1963

Background information
- Born: 21 September 1893; Helsinki, Grand Duchy of Finland
- Died: 5 March 1977 (aged 83) Stockholm, Sweden
- Genre: Classical
- Occupations: Composer, conductor, musician, music critic
- Years active: 1906–1976
- Spouse: Ilse Maria Kutzleb (1923–1960)

Moses Pergament (21 September 1893 – 5 March 1977) was a Finnish-Swedish composer, conductor, and music critic. He is largely seen as one of the most influential figures in the first generation of Swedish modernism.

== Biography ==
=== Education ===
Pergament studied music at various locations across Europe during his youth, including at the Saint Petersburg Conservatory between 1908 and 1912. He then returned to Finland, studying at the University of Helsinki, and later moved to Sweden and studied at the Stockholm University in 1919, gaining Swedish citizenship a year prior. He studied at the Stern Conservatory of Berlin from 1921 to 1923.

=== Career ===
He was a composer of primarily classical music, having written four string quartets, a violin concerto, a piano concerto, Den judiska sången for orchestra, choir and vocal soloists, as well as various a cappella choir compositions. He made his compositional debut in Finland in 1914. He also wrote scenic music and music for various Swedish films, one of them being Barabbas in 1953.

Pergament conducted both orchestras and choirs during his lifetime. He became a music critic at the Svenska Dagbladet in 1923, a post he remained at until 1937. In the 1940s, the Lund University choir would perform some of his a capella compositions during a tour in the United States.

His work Den judiska sången, sometimes referred to as a choral symphony, was a piece that became famous among European Jewry due to its basis in the ongoing Holocaust in Europe at the time. The composition, along with others that he would write, held many influences of Yiddish language and culture.

In 1952, he became a member of the Royal Swedish Academy of Music. In 1967, he received the Medaljen för tonkonstens främjande.

=== Personal life ===
He married Ilse Maria Kutleb in 1923; she died in 1960. He died in Stockholm in 1977 at the age of 83.

He is the brother of Finnish conductor, writer and composer Simon Parmet as well as uncle to Finnish composer and pianist Erna Tauro through his brother Isak.

== Selected works ==
- Duo for violin and cello (1917)
- Sonata for violin and piano (1918–20)
- Krelantems och Eldeling, ballet music for orchestra (1921/1925-26)
- String Quartet No. 1 (1920–22)
- Rapsodia ebraica (1935)
- Dibbuk (1936, later revised)
- Swedish Rhapsody for orchestra (1941)
- Den judiska sången ("Jewish song"), choral symphony for soloists, chorus and orchestra (1943-1945)
- Violin concerto (1948, later revised)
- Entrance and Dance of the Robots (1951)
- String Quartet No. 2; Piano concerto (1952)
- Concerto for cello and orchestra (1955)
- Five sketches for string quartet (1956)
- Concerto for E-viola and orchestra (1964–65)
- String Quartet No. 3 (1956/1967)
- Sonata for flute and piano (1968)
- Fantasia differente for cello and strings (1970)
- String Quartet No. 4 (1975)

=== Film soundtracks ===
- They Staked Their Lives (1939-1940)
- The Girl and the Devil (1944)
- Barabbas (1953)
