= Moominland Midwinter =

1957 children's book by Tove Jansson

- First edition (Swedish)
- Author: Tove Jansson
- Original title: Trollvinter
- Language: Swedish
- Series: Moomins
- Genre: Children's novel
- Publisher: Gebers
- Publication date: 1957
- Publication place: Finland
- Pages: 168
- Preceded by: Moominsummer Madness
- Followed by: Tales from Moominvalley

Moominland Midwinter (Swedish: Trollvinter, "Troll Winter") is the sixth in the series of Moomin books by Swedish-speaking Finnish writer Tove Jansson, published in 1957. Her biographer Boel Westin describes the book as being a story about balance and Moomintroll's growing experience.

== Plot ==
While the rest of the Moomin family are in the deep slumber of their winter hibernation, Moomintroll finds himself awake and unable to get back to sleep. He discovers a world hitherto unknown to him, where the sun does not rise and the ground is covered with cold, white, wet powder.

Moomintroll is lonely at first but soon meets Too-Ticky, a wise spirit who sings mysterious songs, and his old friend Little My (who takes delight in sledging down the snowy hills on Moominmamma's silver tea tray).

The friends build a snow horse for the Lady Of The Cold and mourn the passing of an absent-minded squirrel who gazed into the Lady's eyes and froze to death. However, a squirrel is spotted alive by Moomintroll at the end of the book; it seems that the animal may have come back to life.

As the haunting winter progresses, many characters (notably the Groke, Sorry-oo the small dog, and a boisterous skiing Hemulen) come to Moominvalley in search of warmth, shelter and Moominmamma's stores of jam.

== Analysis ==
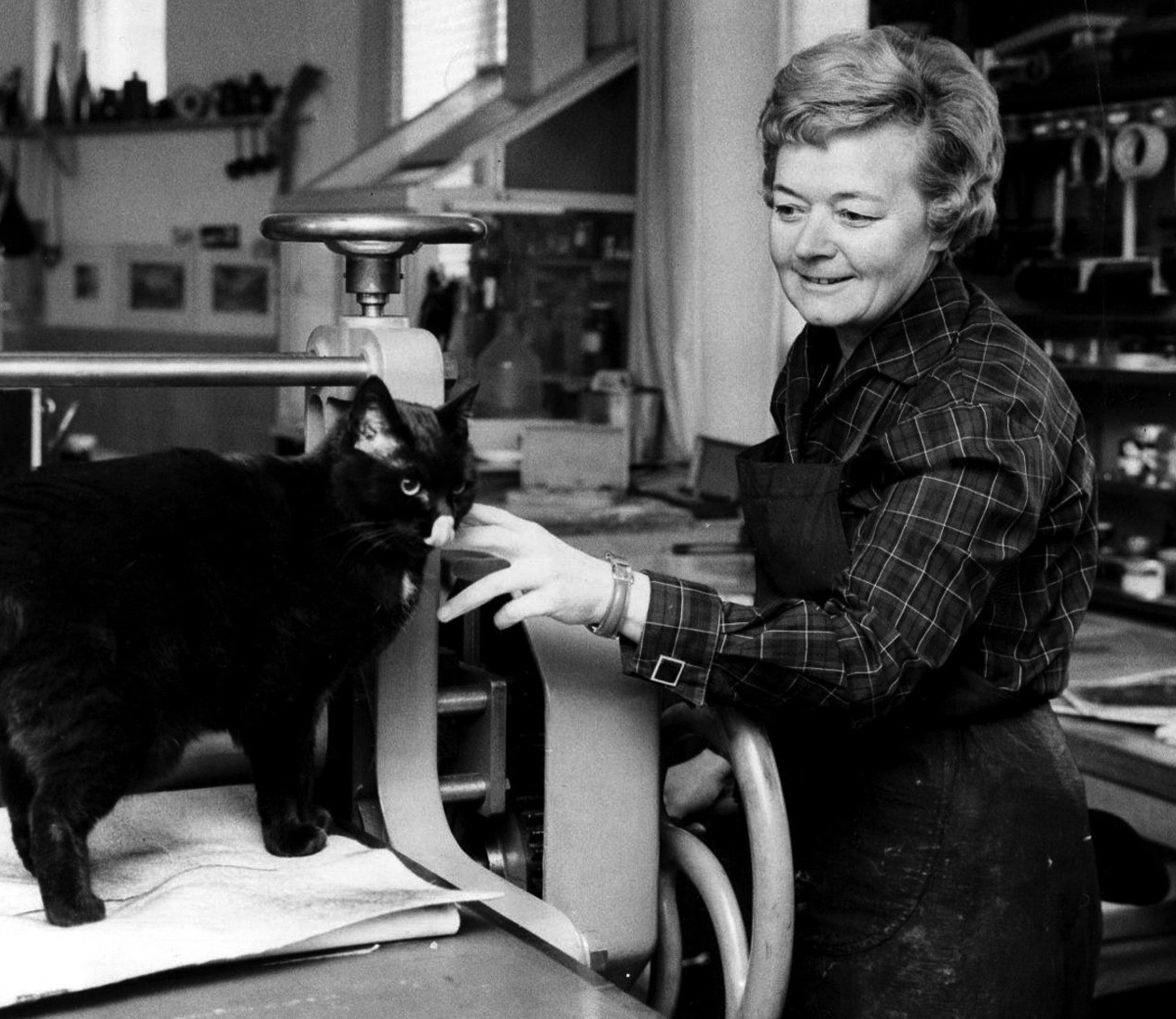
Jansson's life partner Tuulikki Pietilä appears in the novel as the character Too-Ticky.

Compared to the earlier Moomin books, Moominland Midwinter sees Jansson adopt a darker, more introspective tone that is continued in the remainder of the series. Often in the book Moomintroll is either lonely, miserable, angry or scared – the result of being forced to survive in a world to which he feels he does not belong. While preserving the charm of the previous novels, the story involves a more in-depth exploration of Moomintroll's character than before.

The novel explores the character of the series' lead, Moomintroll. In her book Tove Jansson: Life, Art, Words, Boel Westin describes the main themes of the novel: "Moominland Midwinter is a story about balance; balance between greyness, darkness and cold, and balance between colour, light and warmth. The seasons present a play of pictures that step by step reveals Moomintroll's deepening experience." In Tove Jansson, W. Glyn Jones agrees, "The absolute and unquestioned reality of the world of childhood now becomes less clearly defined, something a growing Moomintroll can question. Likewise, Moomintroll, who has hitherto been protected, now learns to live without that protection."

The new character, Too-Ticky, is a representation of Jansson's life-long partner, Tuulikki Pietilä (nickname, Tooti) who was often an inspiration for her.

== Adaptations ==
Moominland Midwinter was adapted into episodes 23-33 of the 1977 stop motion series which was compiled into the 2017 feature film Moomins and the Winter Wonderland, as well as episodes 22, 23 and 37 in the 1990 TV series.

The book was adapted by BBC Radio 4, as part of their Christmas Day 2021 Schedule, starring John Finnemore as Moomintroll, Rakie Ayola as Too-Ticky, and Clare Corbett as Little My; Samantha Bond was the narrator.

== See also ==
- Moomintroll: Winter's Warmth – a 2026 video game
