= Who Will Comfort Toffle? =

1960 children's book by Tove Jansson

- First edition
- Author: Tove Jansson
- Language: Swedish
- Series: Moomins
- Genre: Picture book
- Publisher: Schildts/Gebers
- Publication date: 1960
- Publication place: Finland
- English publication date: 1960
- Pages: 24
- Preceded by: The Book about Moomin, Mymble and Little My
- Followed by: The Dangerous Journey

Who Will Comfort Toffle? (Swedish: Vem ska trösta knyttet?) is the second picture book in the Moomin series by the Finland Swedish writer Tove Jansson. It was first published in 1960 by Schildts/Gebers, and was first translated into English by Kingsley Hart.

== Plot ==
Toffle once lived alone in a small house in a forest where he is continually frightened by the screams from The Groke as well as giant hemulens walking outside his home. One day, he decided that he has had enough of this ordeal, and abandons what was once his home to find someone to comfort him.

Throughout his quest to find someone to befriend, he encounters Fillyjonks, Whompses, Mymble and Little My, Snufkin, and a Hemulan hosting a party. However, Toffle was too scared to socialize with them.

Eventually, he rests at a beach and finds a beautiful seashell, of which he decides it to be his new home. Not too long after, Toffle finds a message in a bottle from Miffle, who wrote how scared she was from The Groke. Now motivated, Toffle set off to try and rescue the Miffle, and for the first time he starts to have confidence with talking to people, and received help from a giant Booble on where Miffle was.

At last, Toffle finds Miffle and confronts the Groke. He bites her in her tail, scaring her to the point she runs off to the hill, giving Toffle the chance to comfort Miffle. However, he once again was too shy to speak to her, and instead writes a letter to the Miffle.

From that they on, the two become friends, as they sail on a boat rowed by a Fillyjonk greeted and cheered by all the extra characters that were featured in the story.

== Analysis ==
Tove Jansson's biographer Boel Westin writes that the picture book records the moment when Jansson was transitioning from drawing comic strips to painting. The picture book combines a text and pictures, but allowed her the freedom to work on a much larger area than a comic panel. In Westin's view, the book's images are "figurative, but the pure, simplified forms have an abstract effect."

Who Will Comfort Toffle? was Jansson's second picture book. Like the first one, The Book about Moomin, Mymble and Little My, it was written entirely in verse, but unlike in that book there are no holes in the pages. The paintings have large areas of bright, flat colour, giving them a look resembling Concretist modern art.

== Adaptations ==
An audiobook version of the story was released as an LP album in 1978 by the Swedish acid/psych progg duo of Peter Lundblad and Torbjörn Eklund. 2 years later, the audiobook was adapted into an animated short film made by Swedish animator Johan Hagelbäck and produced by the Swedish Film Institute. This was one of the 2 animated adaptations of the book, with the other short made in 2023.

In 2006 the main character (Knytt in Swedish) was featured in the indie game series, Knytt. The series consisted of 3 releases and one expansion. The final release, Knytt Underground, was published in 2012.

== Sources ==
- Karjalainen, Tuula (2016) [2013]. Tove Jansson: Work and Love. Penguin Books. ISBN 978-0-141-97882-6.
- Westin, Boel (2014) [2007]. Tove Jansson Life, Art, Words: The Authorised Biography. Translated by Mazzarella, Silvester. Sort of Books. ISBN 978-1-908745-45-3.
