= Erna Tauro =

Finnish-Swedish composer and pianist (1916–1993)

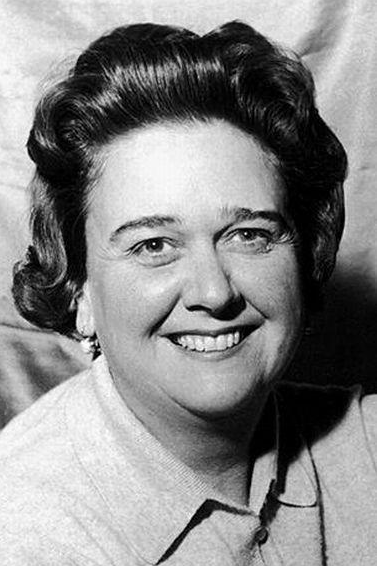

Background information
- Born: Erna Pergament; 16 August 1916; Viipuri, then-Finland
- Died: 4 June 1993 (aged 76) Stockholm, Sweden
- Occupations: Composer, pianist
- Years active: 1955-1993
- Spouse: Risto Ilmari Tauro

Erna Tauro (née Pergament; 16 August 1916 – 4 June 1993), was a Finland-Swedish pianist and composer, as well as a theatre musician and teacher. She is remembered for her collaboration with Tove Jansson.

== Biography ==
Erna Pergament was born in 1916, in Viipuri. She was the daughter of Isak Pergament and Rifka (née Rosenthal), and niece of composers Moses Pergament and Simon Parmet. The family moved to Berlin in 1921 and later to Helsinki. Tauro studied piano and music theory in Berlin, and according to some sources, also studied music at the Sibelius Academy in Finland. During World War II, Tauro worked as a nurse and also an accompanist. She married Risto Ilmari Tauro in 1944, and they had one daughter born in 1945. They divorced in 1950. From 1955 to 1969 she was principal accompanist at the Little Theater in Helsinki and composed music for a number of plays and musicals. Alongside her employment at the Little Theater, Tauro also worked as a pianist at Stockmann's lunch restaurant, among other places.

Her composition "Höstvisa" ("Autumn Song") with lyrics by Tove Jansson won third prize in the 1965 Finnish Broadcasting Song Contest. The same year, she won second place with the song "Den gamla brudkläderskan" ("The Old Bridal Wife") with lyrics by Huldén Evert.

In 1969, Tauro received a position as musical director for Fiddler on the Roof in Stockholm, and in 1977 she settled permanently in that city. From 1973 to 1982, Tauro was employed as a music teacher at the Swedish National Academy of Mime and Acting. She died in Stockholm in 1993 and is buried at the cemetery in Skogskyrkogården.

Tauro is best known for the songs for Moomin, a series of children's books by Tove Jansson which were translated into plays and animation. Music for the last play, King Moomin Valley, was finished by composer Mika Pohjola after the death of Jansson and Tauro and premiered in August 2008.

In 2010, a scholarship fund was established, which awards the Erna Tauro Scholarship, to support young Finnish musical theatre artists.

== Selected works ==
- Kahdeksikko, musical
- Oli kevät, musical
- Guldbröllop, musical
- Moomin behind the scenes, songs for a play
- Höstvisa
- Den gamla brudkläderskan
- Troll i kulisserna
