= Moomin World =

Theme park in Finland

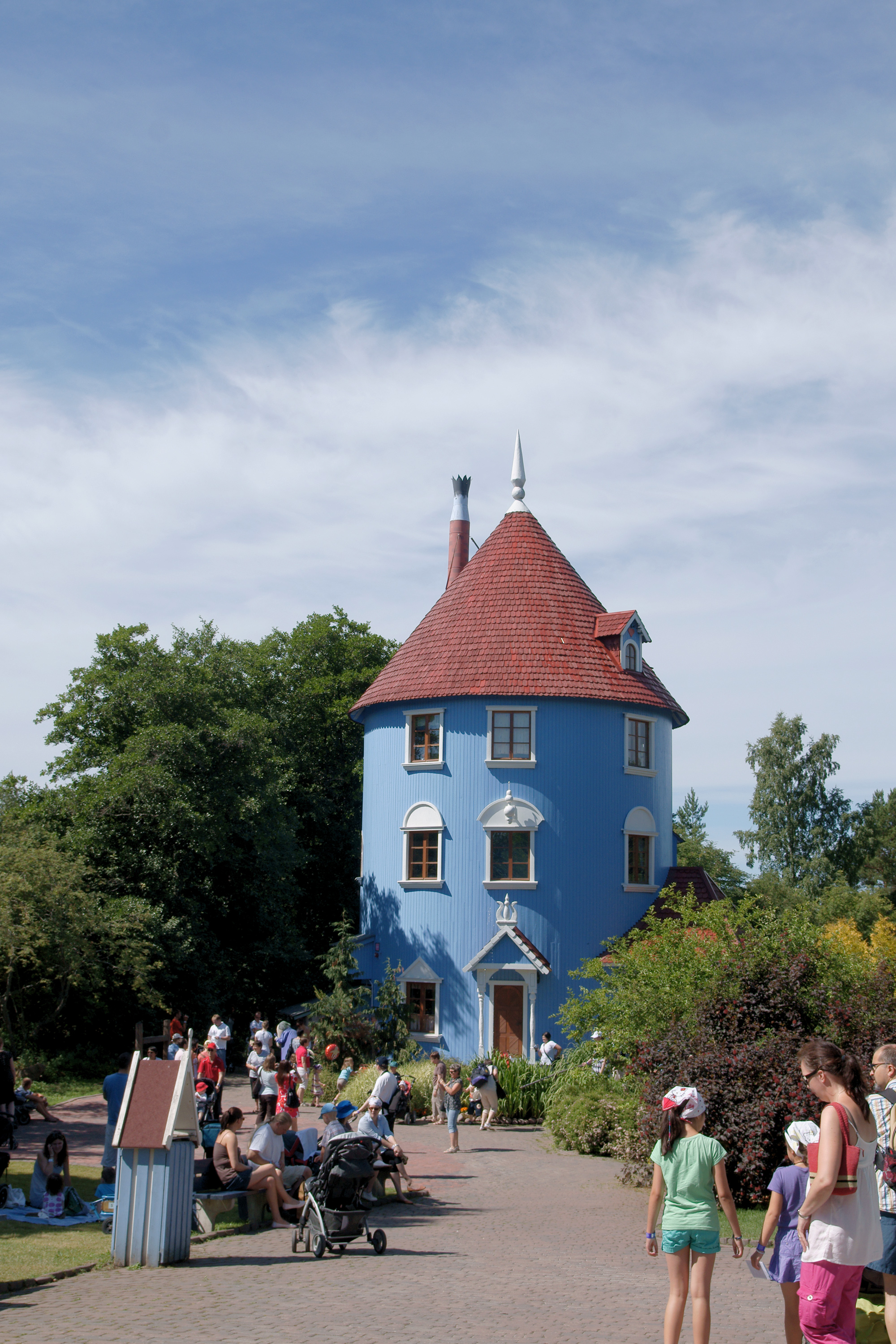
- Naantali, Finland, Moomin House in Moomin World
- Interactive map of Moomin World
- Location: Naantali, Finland
- Coordinates: 60°28′23″N 022°00′17″E
- Opened: June 26, 1993 (33 years ago)
- Owner: Moomin World Oy
- Theme: Books by Tove Jansson
- Website: www.moominworld.fi

Moomin World (Finnish: Muumimaailma, Swedish: Muminvärlden) is a theme park based on the Moomin books by Finnish writer Tove Jansson. It was designed by Dennis Livson, and is located on the island of Kailo next to the old town of Naantali, in Southwest Finland.

The blueberry-coloured Moomin House is the main attraction of the park, where guests are permitted to visit all five storeys. The full-size moominhouse was built in 1993 to look like Jansson's own earlier drawings of the house. Hemulen's house is located next to the Moomin House. It is also possible to go to, for example, Moominmamma's kitchen, the fire station, Snufkin's camp, and Moominpappa's boat. Visitors can also meet Moomin characters around the park or the Witch in her cottage.

Moomin World is not a traditional amusement park, as it does not have any rides. There are numerous activities and paths including Toffle's Path with the Witch's Labyrinth, The Hattifatteners' Cave and The Groke's House. There are also performances in the covered outdoor Moomin theatre Emma.

Moomin World is open daily from mid-June to mid-August.

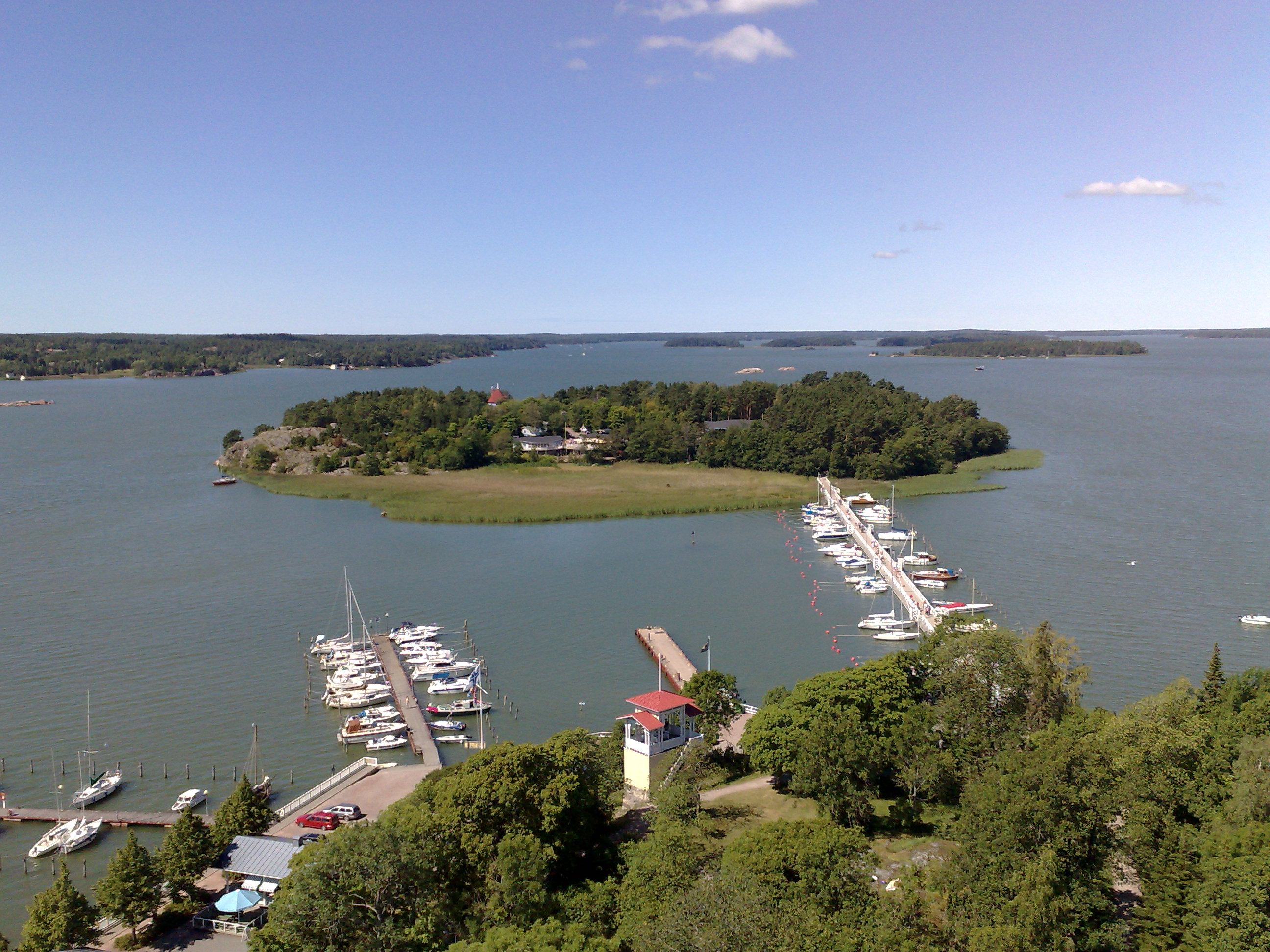
Kailo island

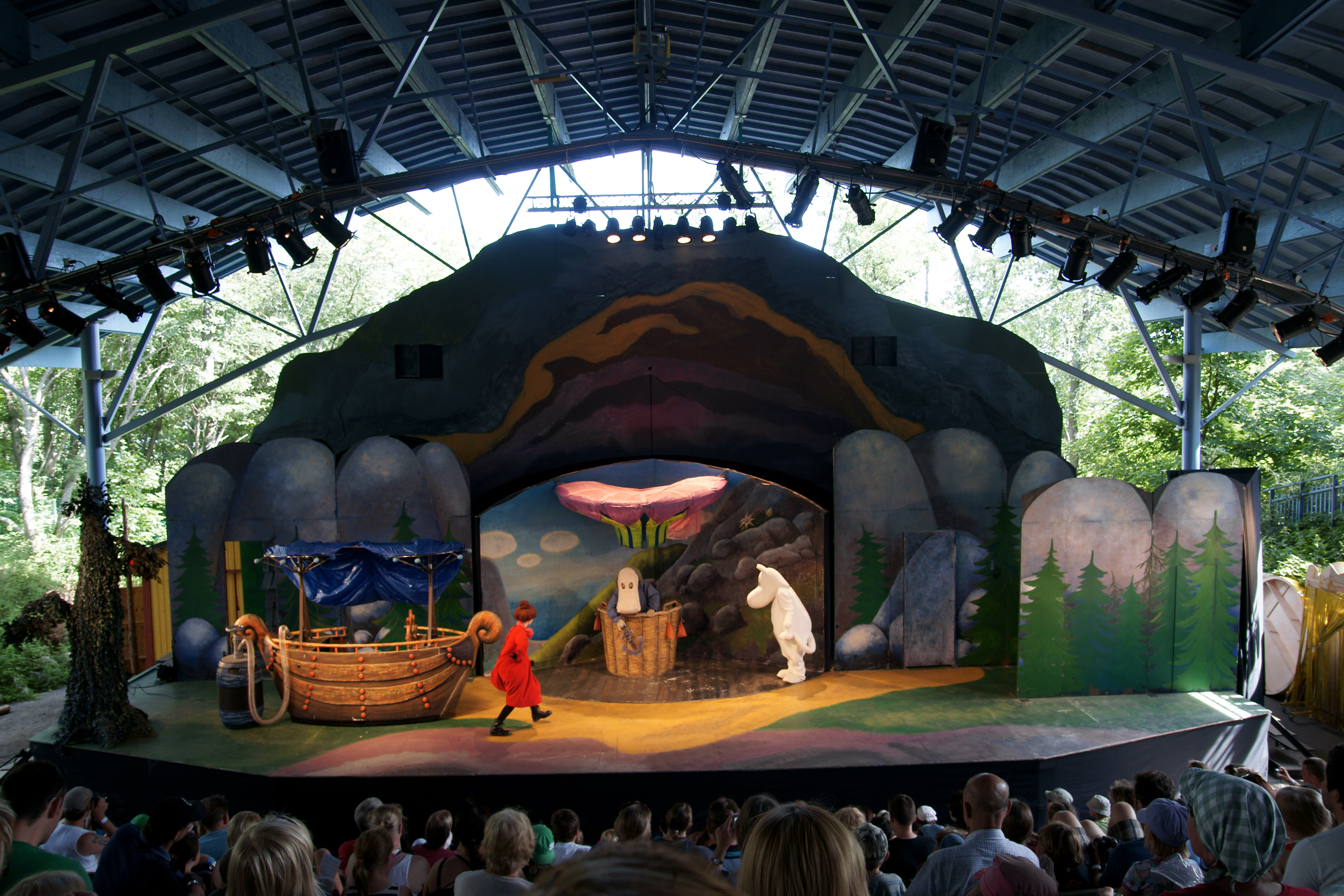
Theatre Emma

== Accolades ==
Moomin World was called the world's fourth best theme park for children according to The Independent on Sunday (October 2005). Moomin World was elected as the domestic travel destination of 2005 (Matkamessut, Finnish Travel Fair 2006). Moomin World won the Golden Pony Award 2007 by The Games & Parks Industry magazine: the jury said that "Moomin World is welcoming, well themed and full of educational content."

== In Japan ==
Metsä ('forest' in Finnish) is a Nordic-themed entertainment park in Hanno city, northwest of Tokyo, Japan. It was opened in March 2019, and includes an area called Moominvalley Park, the first Moomin theme park to be located outside Finland. Metsä was initially planned to start operation in 2015 for the 100th birth year of Tove Jansson, but on June 30, 2015, it was announced that this would be delayed to 2017. On December 6, 2016, the opening date was further pushed back to spring 2019.

== Gallery ==
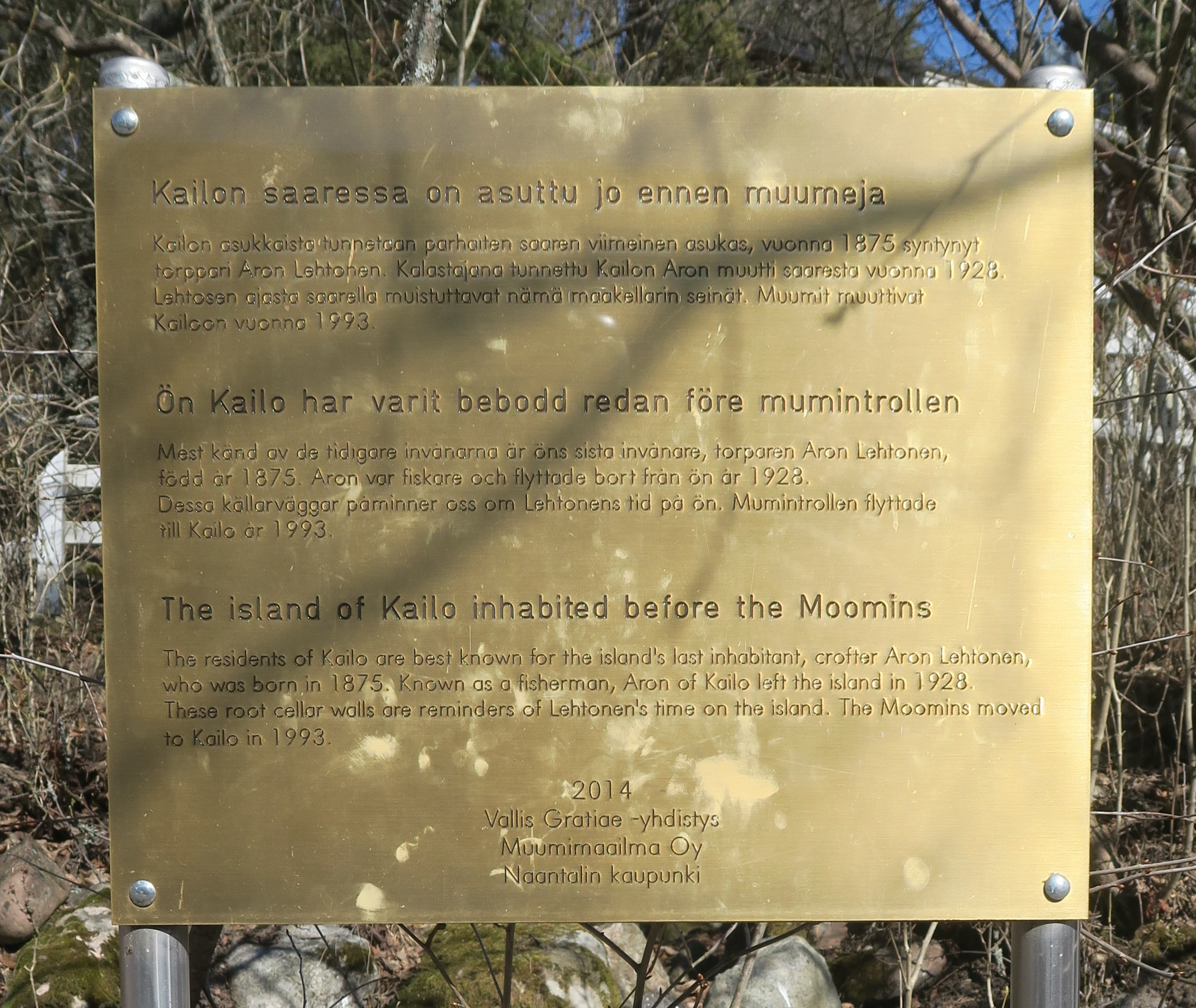
Fisherman Aron Lehtonen's memorial plaque on Kailo island in Naantali. Lehtonen lived in Kailo until CE.1928.

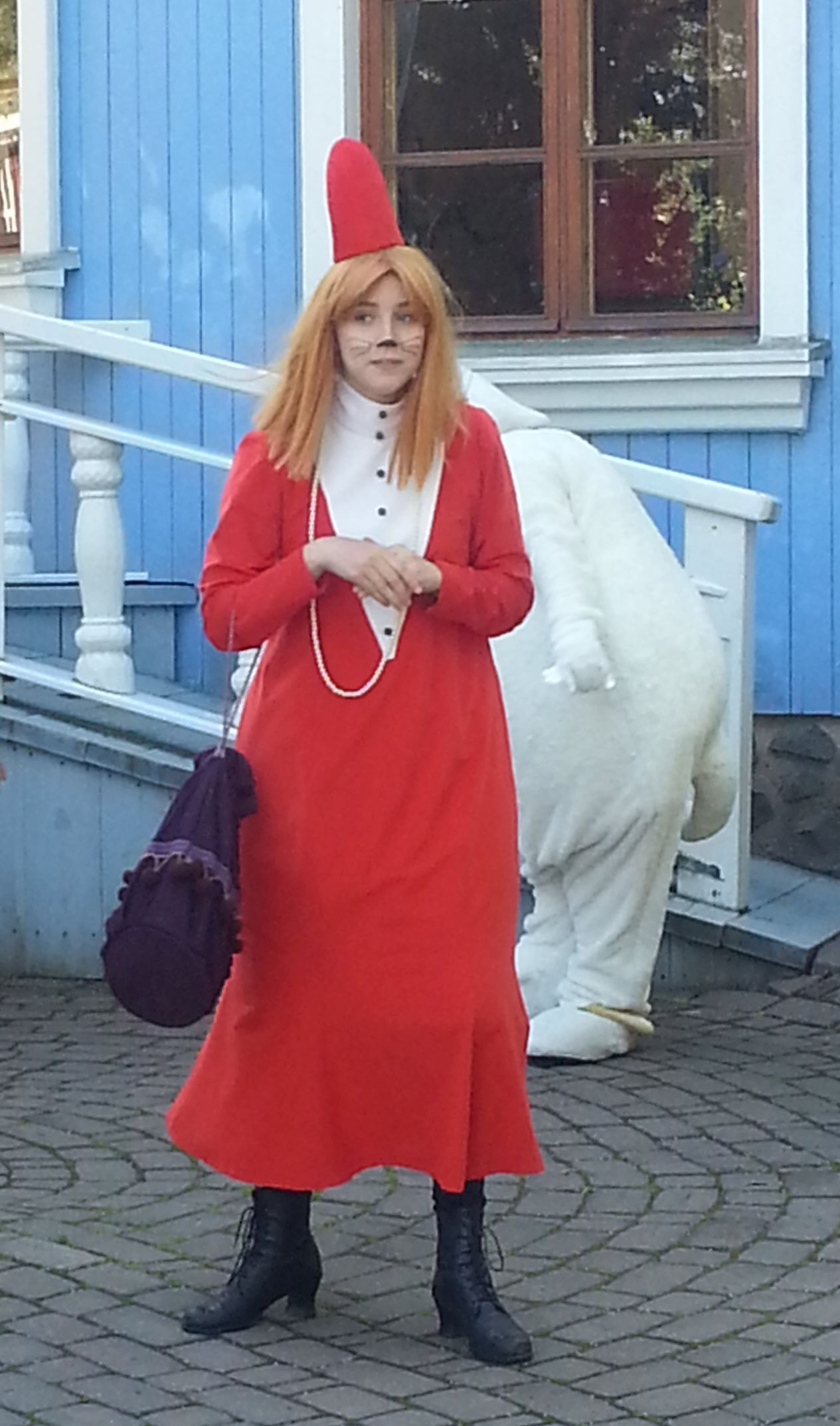
Fillyjonk, Moominworld, Finland

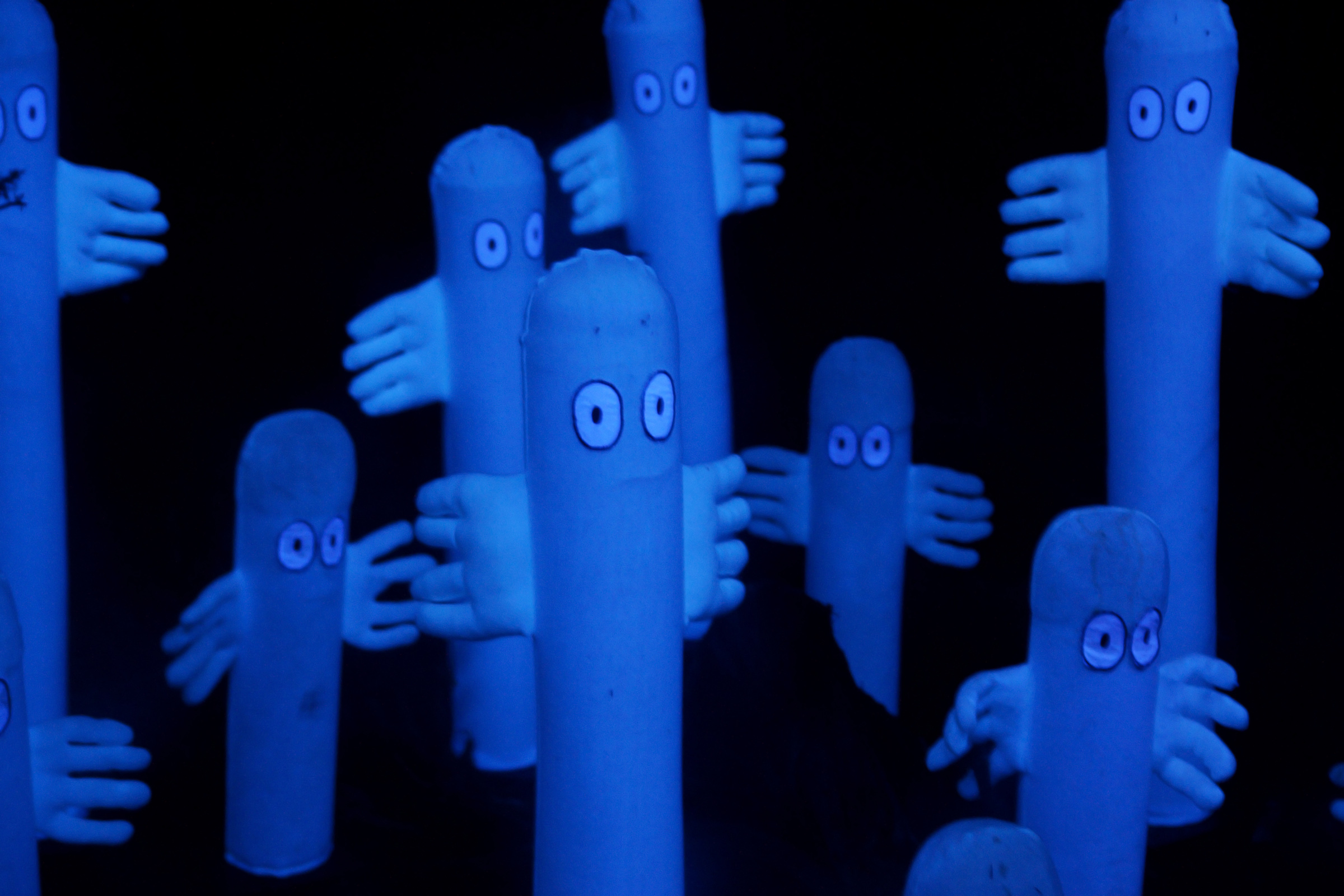
Hattivatje in Moomin World, Naantali.

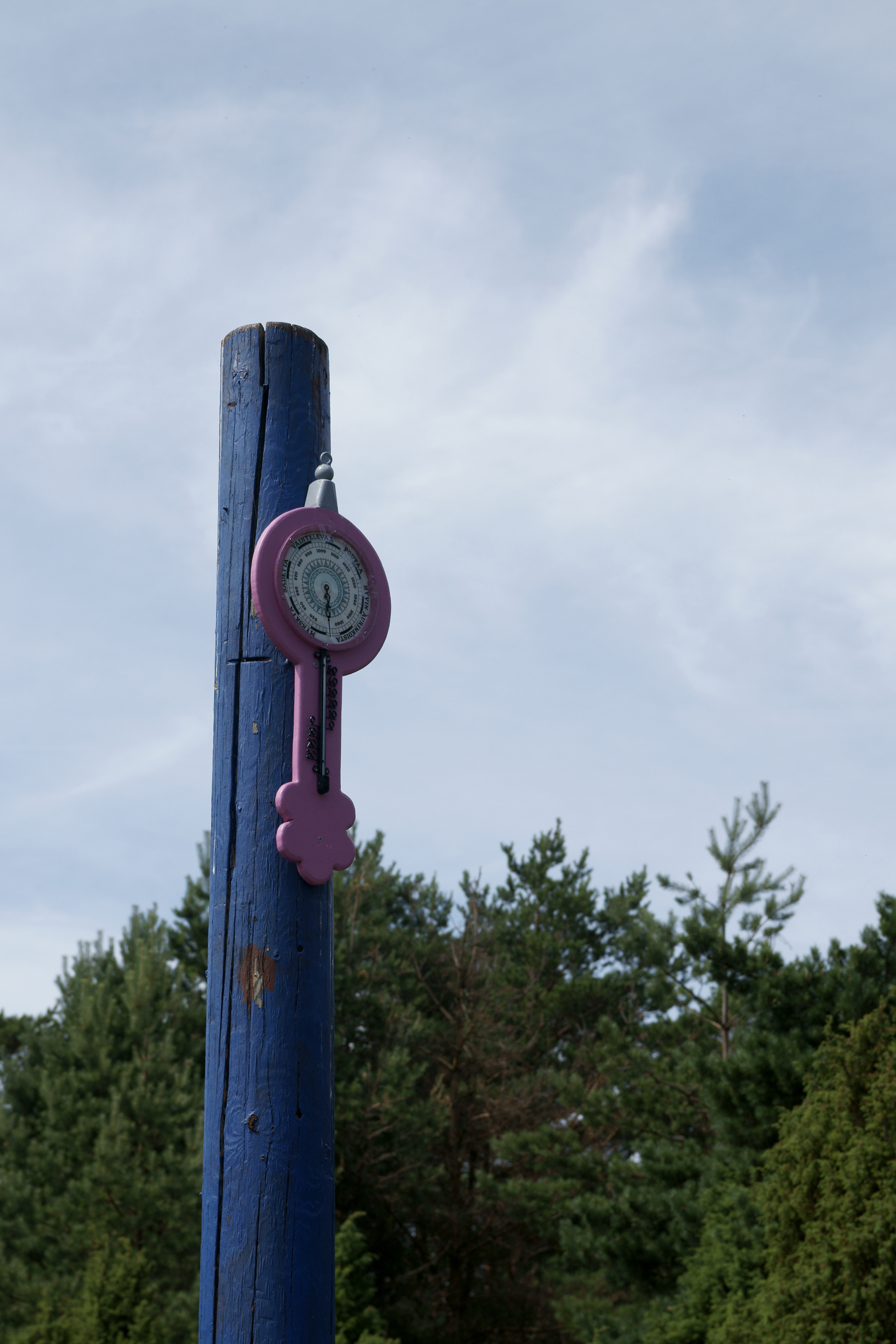
The stake with the barometer of the Hatifnatten from the volume Finn Family Moomintroll

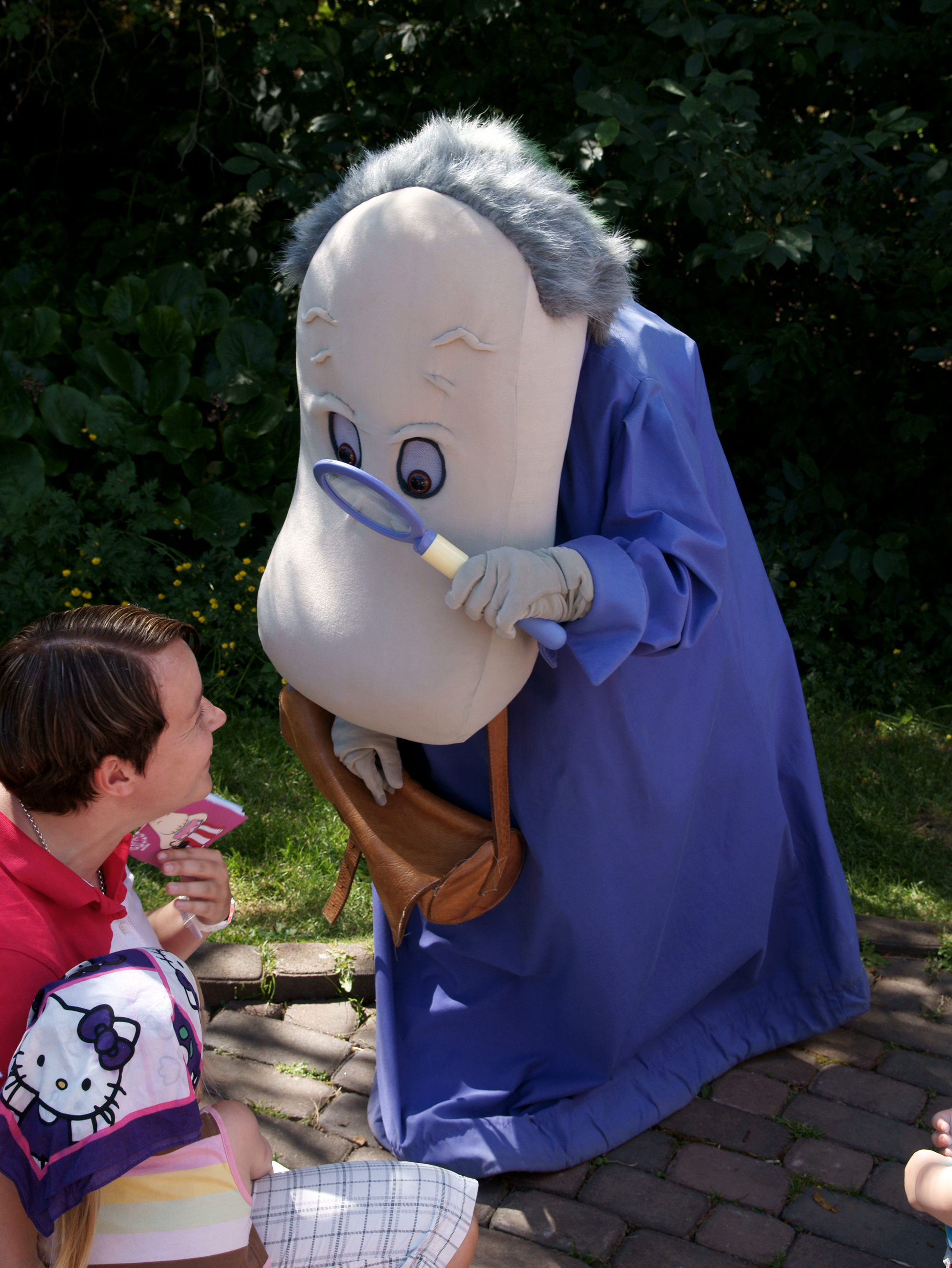
Hemulen in Moomin World, Naantali.

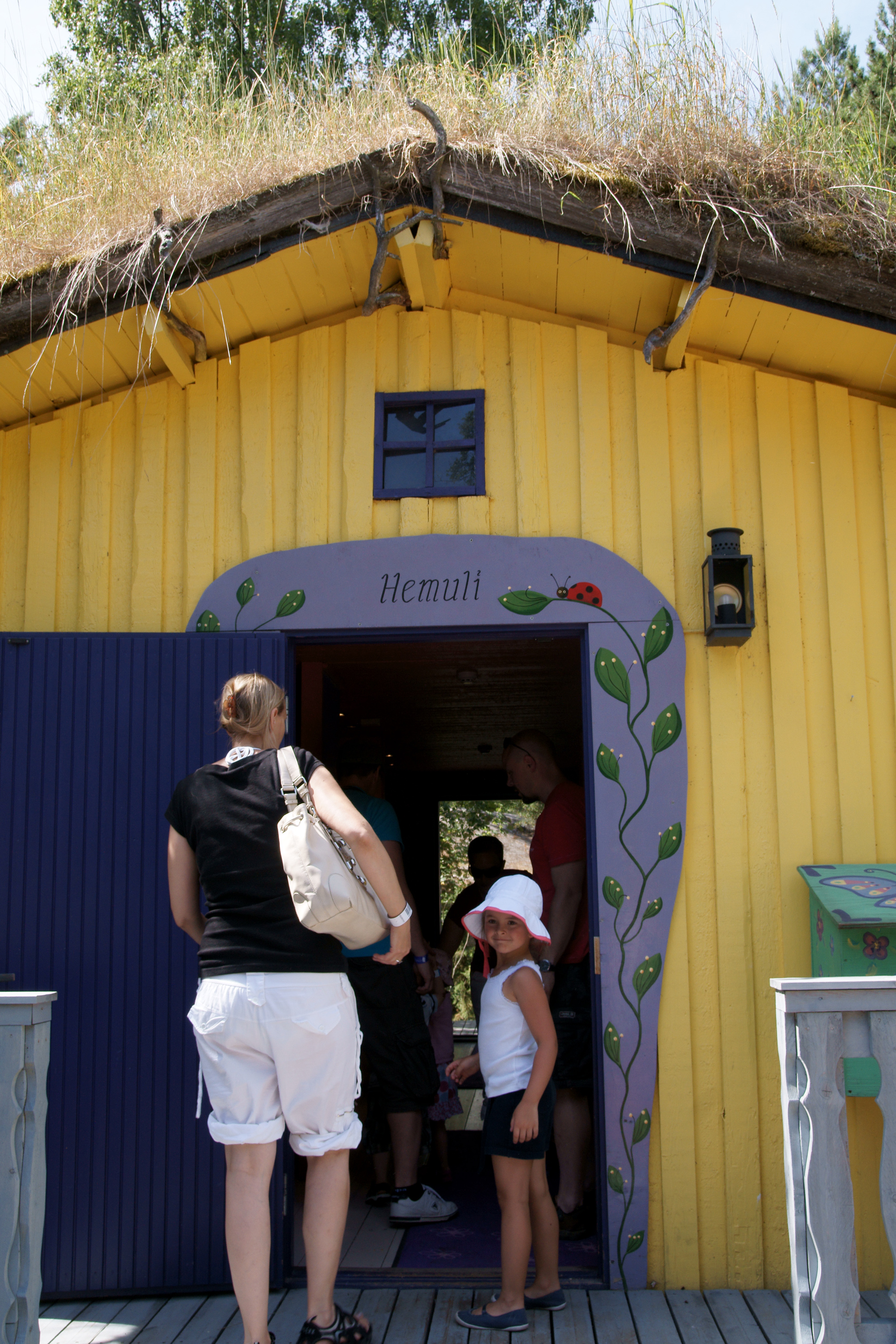
Hemuli's house

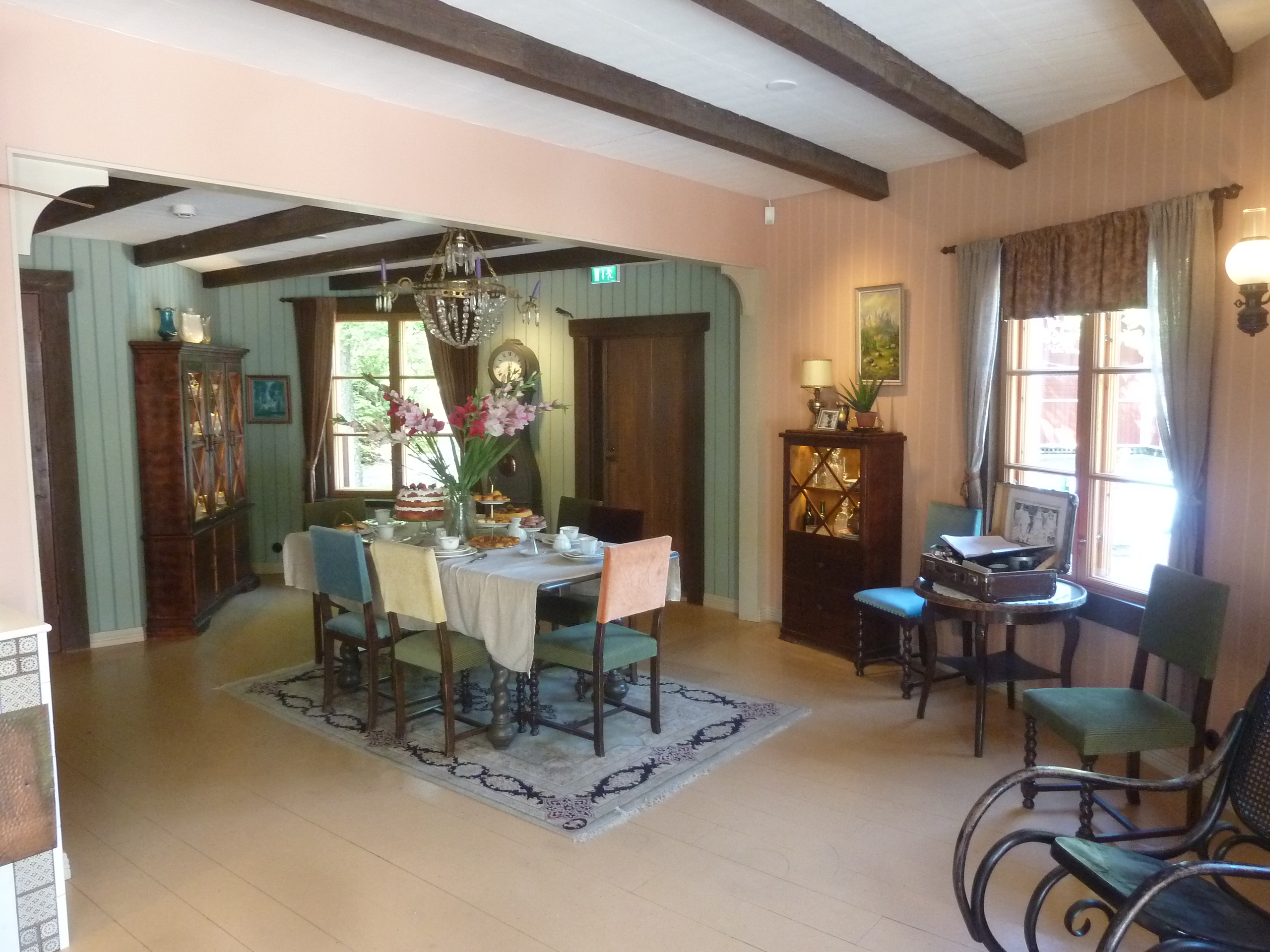
Inside the Moominhouse

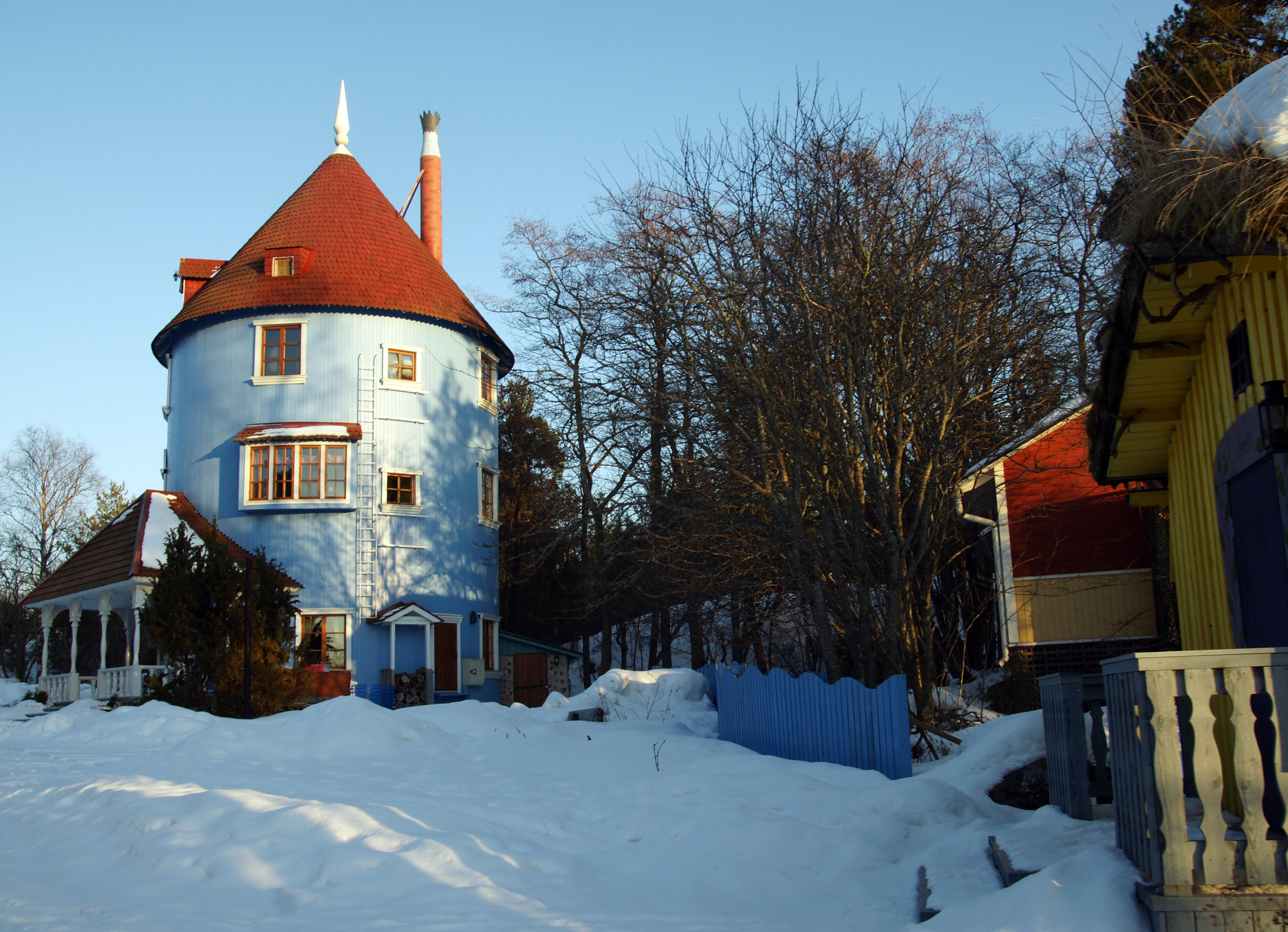
Kailo island in winter.

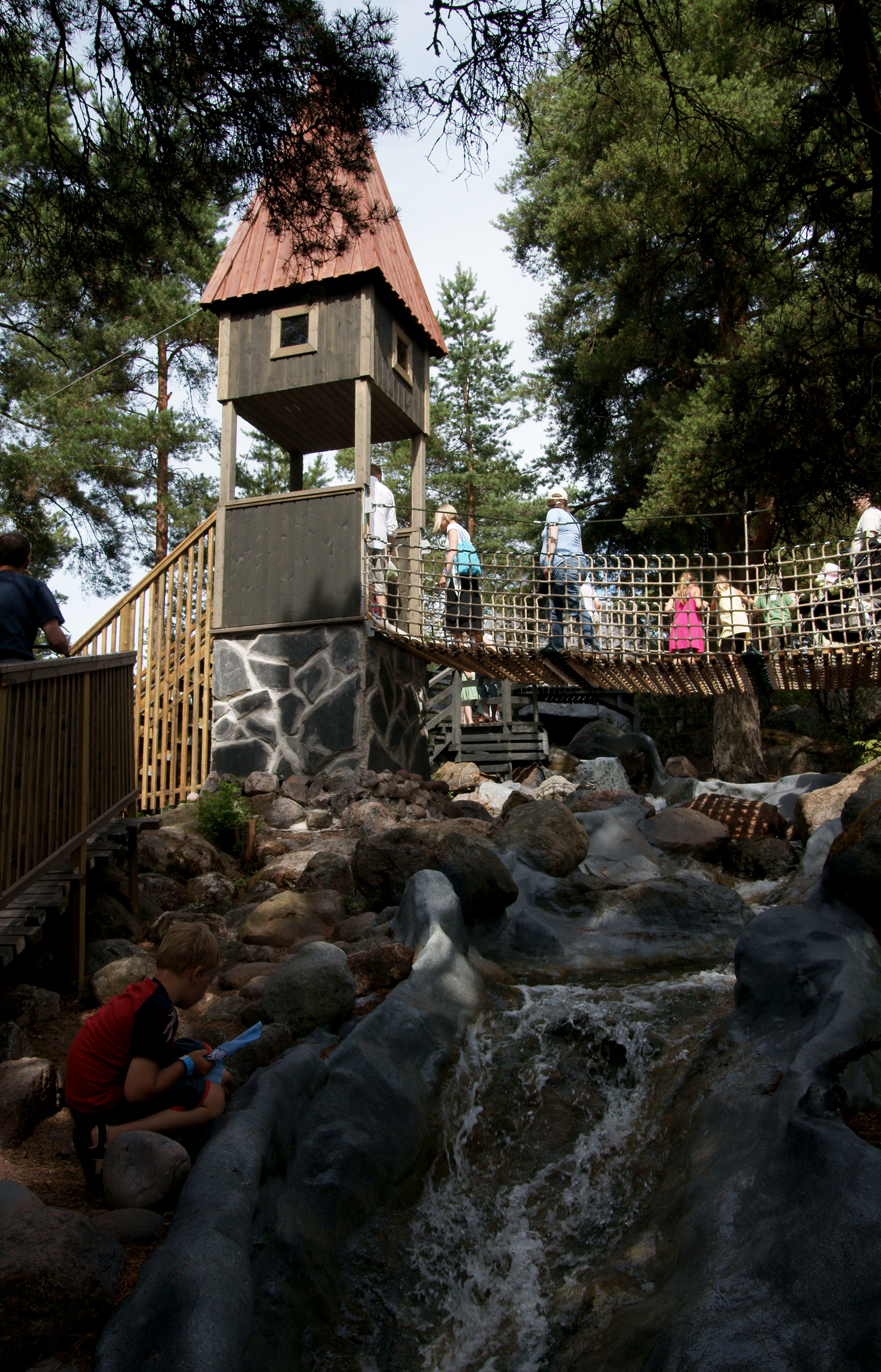
The waterfall and the bridge over it in Moomin World.

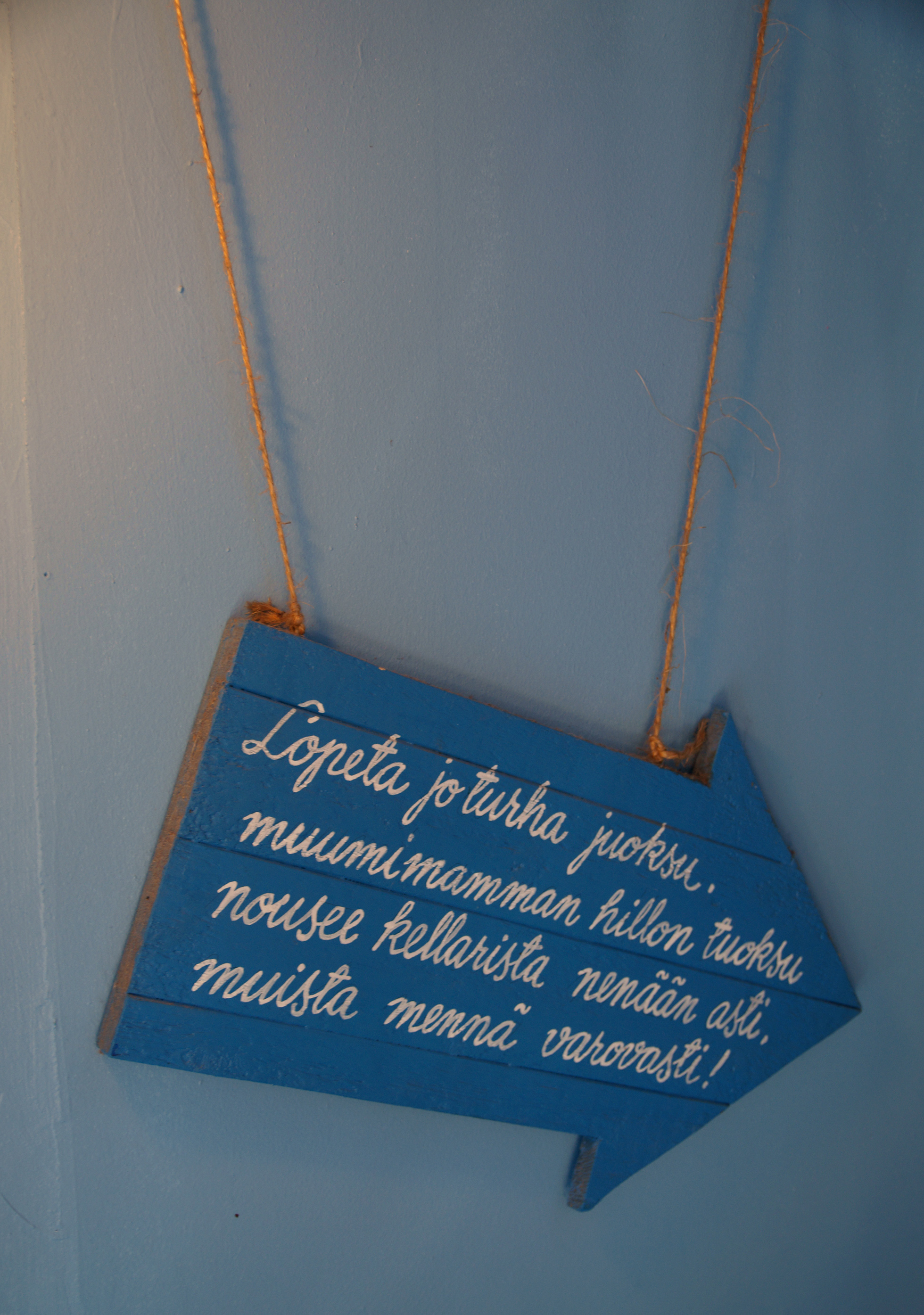
A sign in the Moomin House, Naantali's Moomin world, which translates "Stop running, the smell of Moomin momma's jam rises from the basement to your nose, remember to go carefully!"

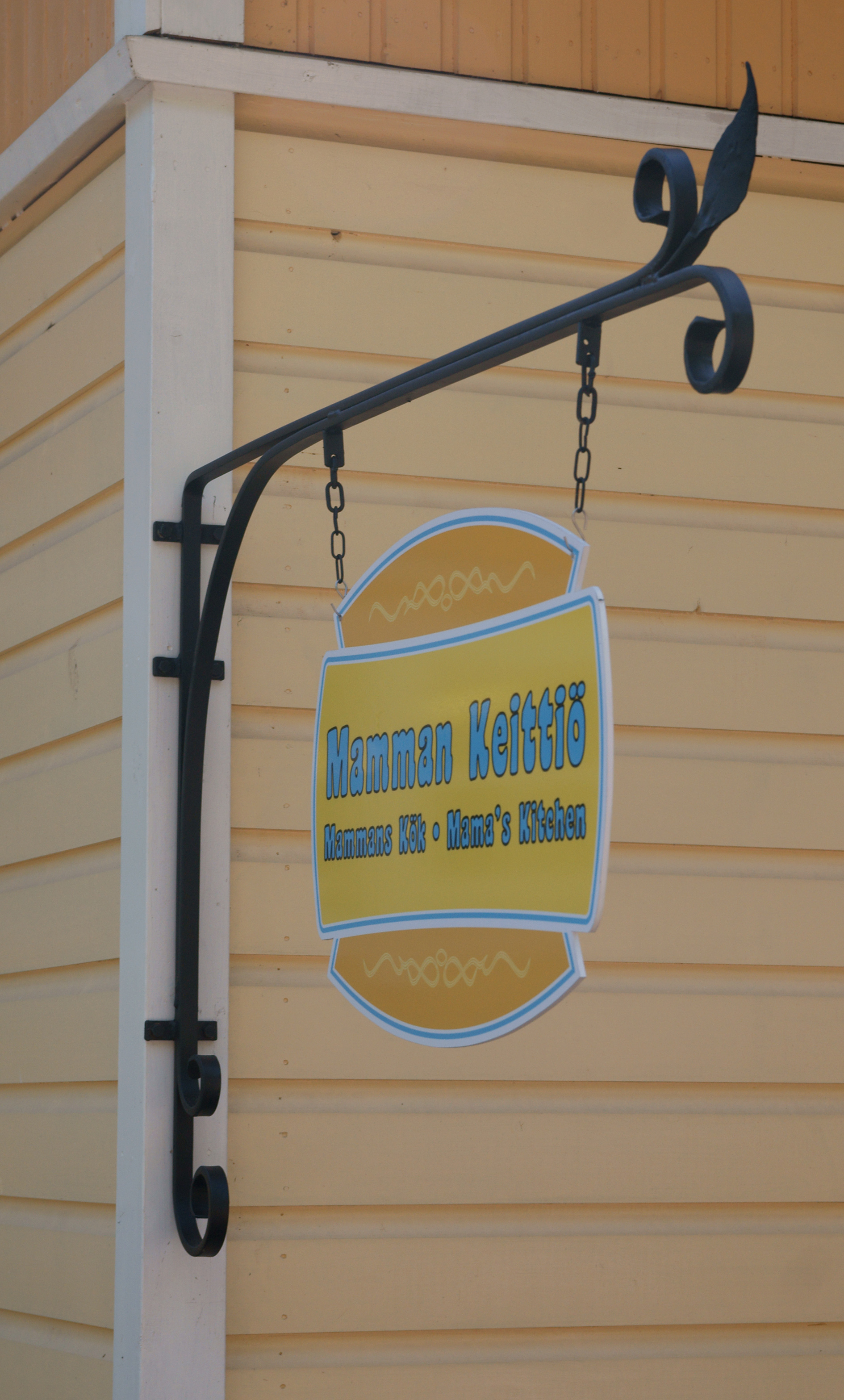
Mamma's Kitchen sign

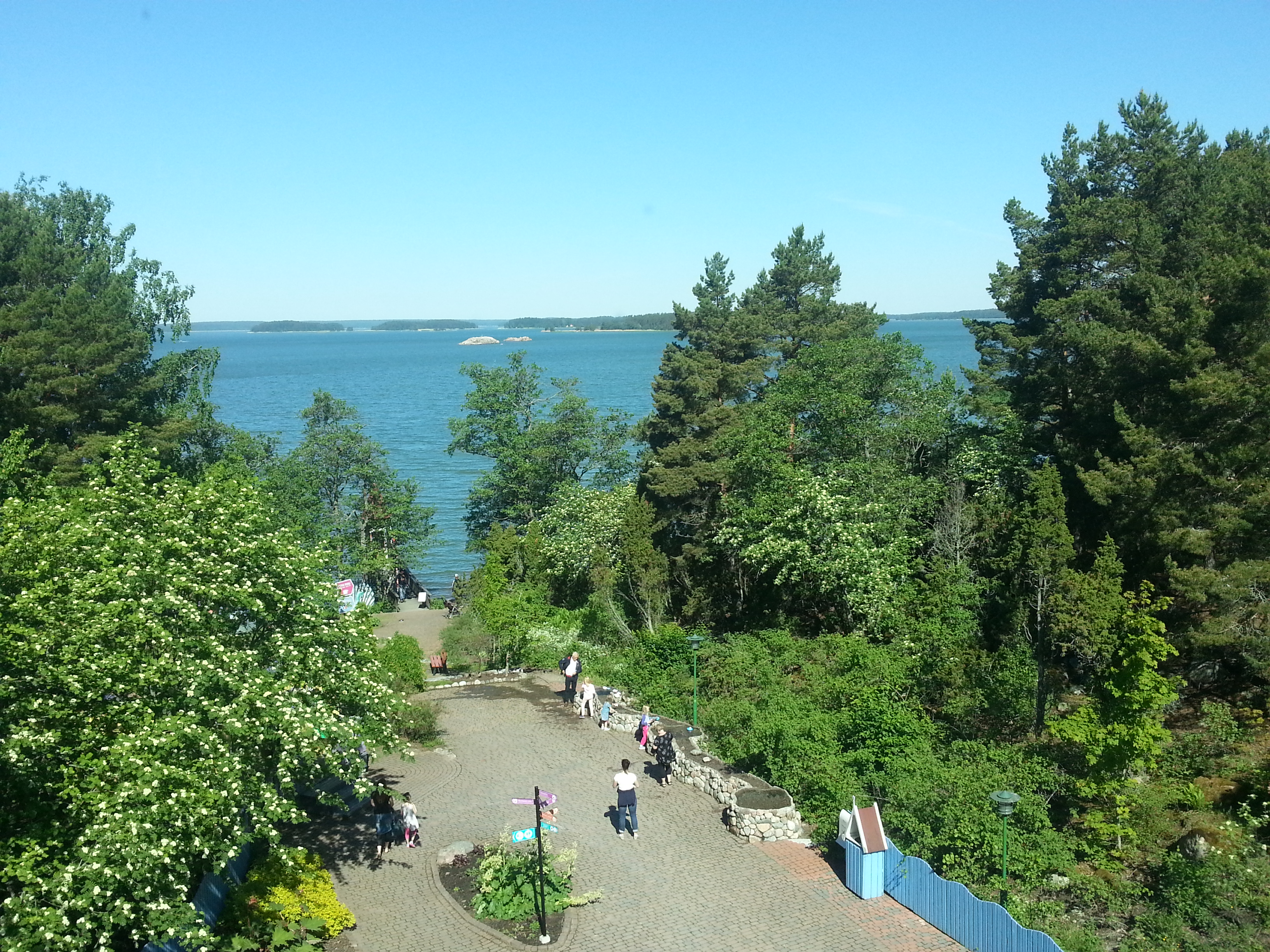
Moomin Valley from the Moominhouse, leading down to the sea and further islands

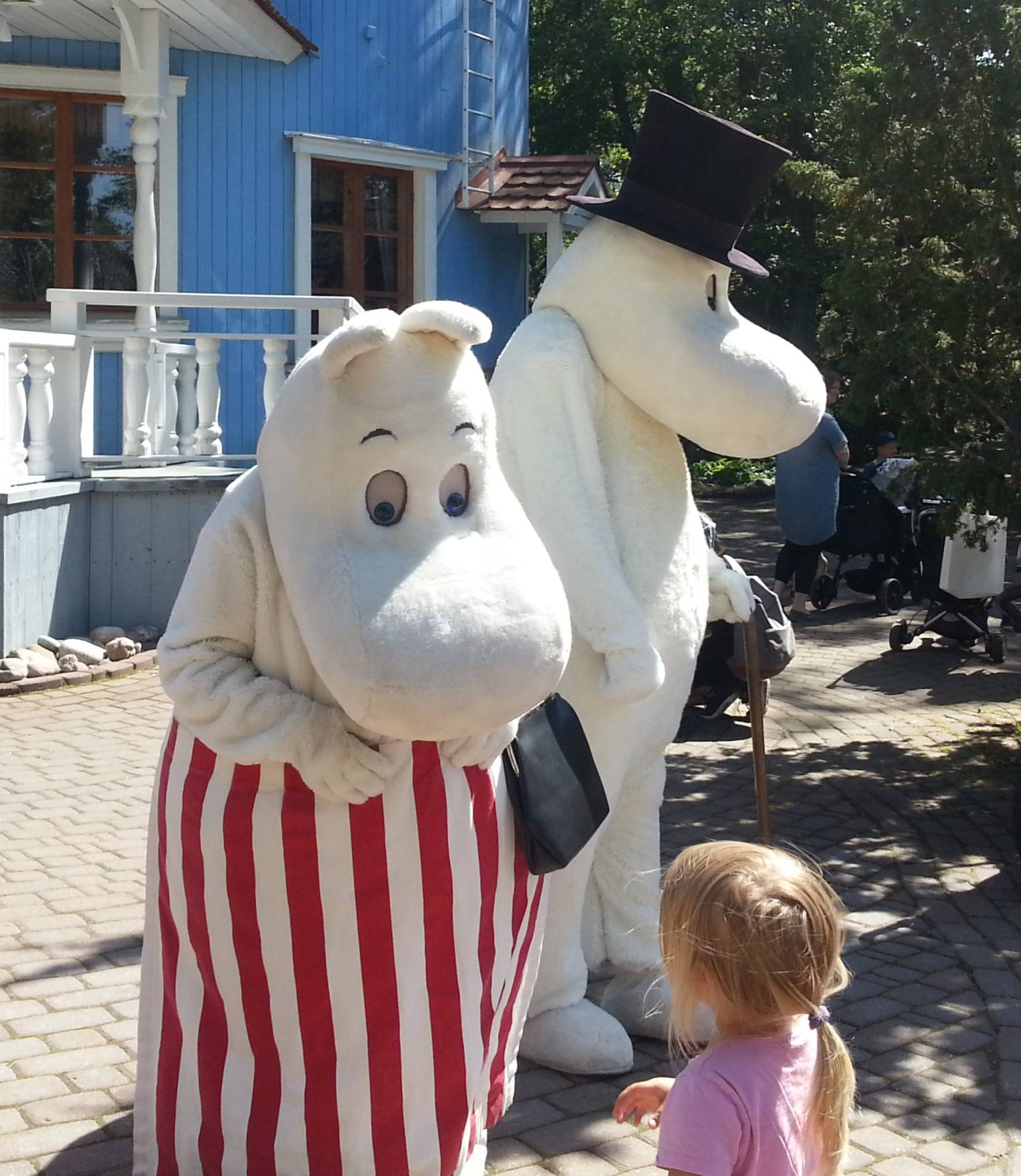
Moominmamma and Moominpappa

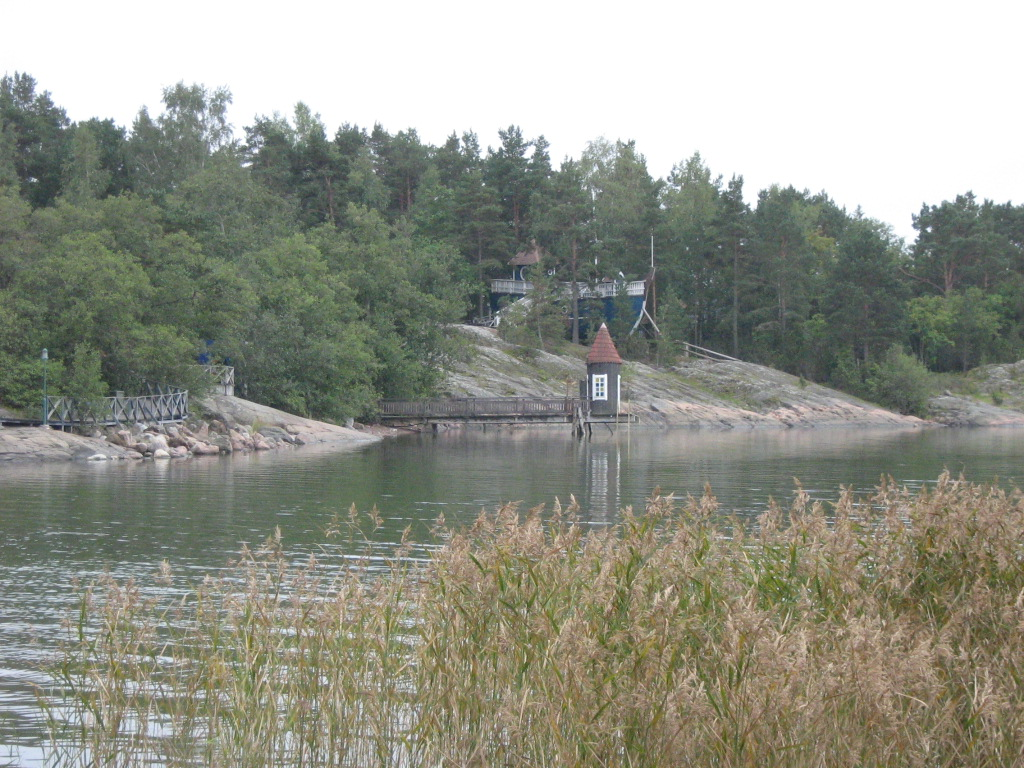
Moomin World in Naantali. Common reed in brackish water (Baltic Sea). Kailo island.

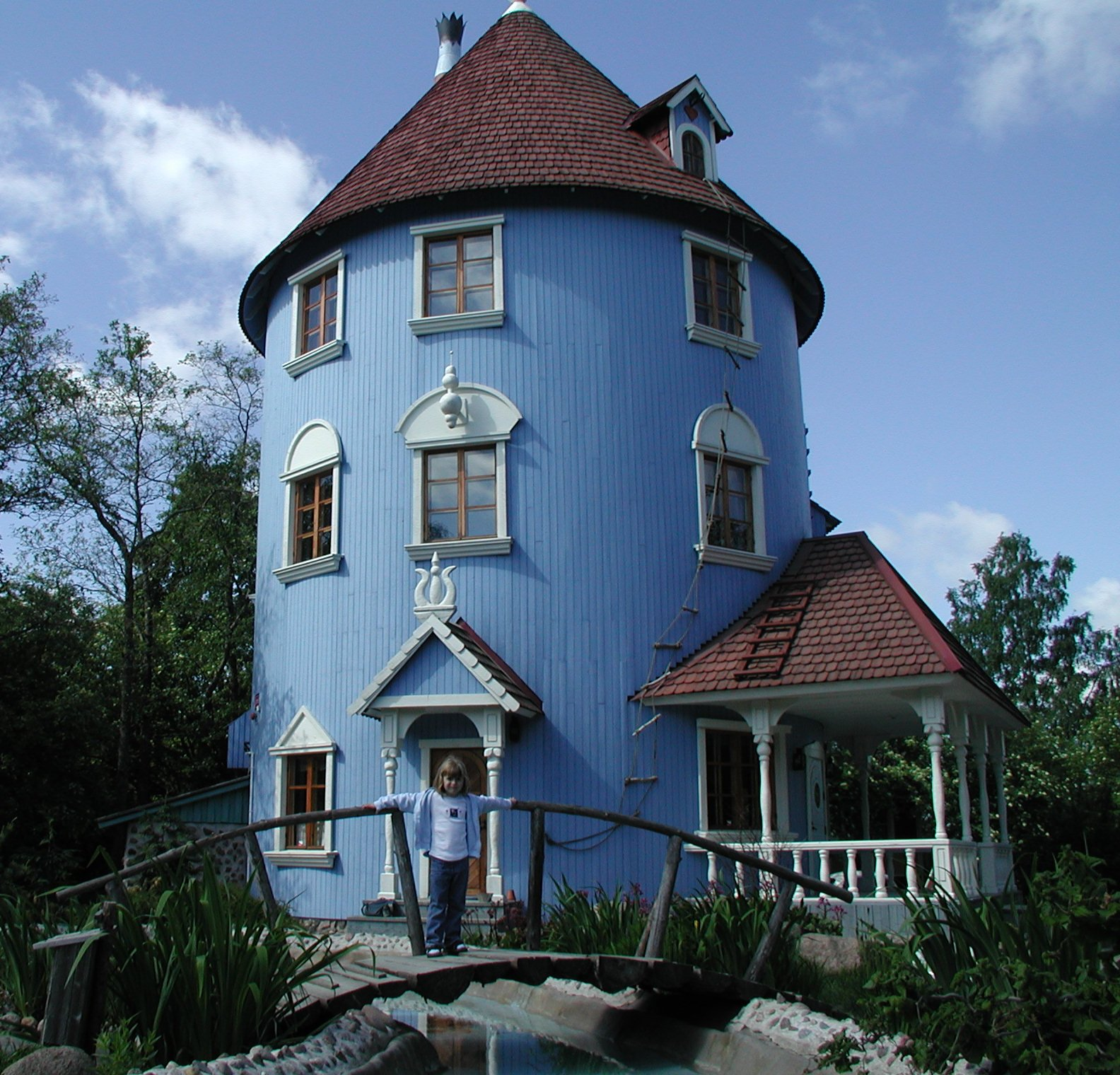
Moomin's house in Muumimaailma (Moomin World) in Naantali, Finland

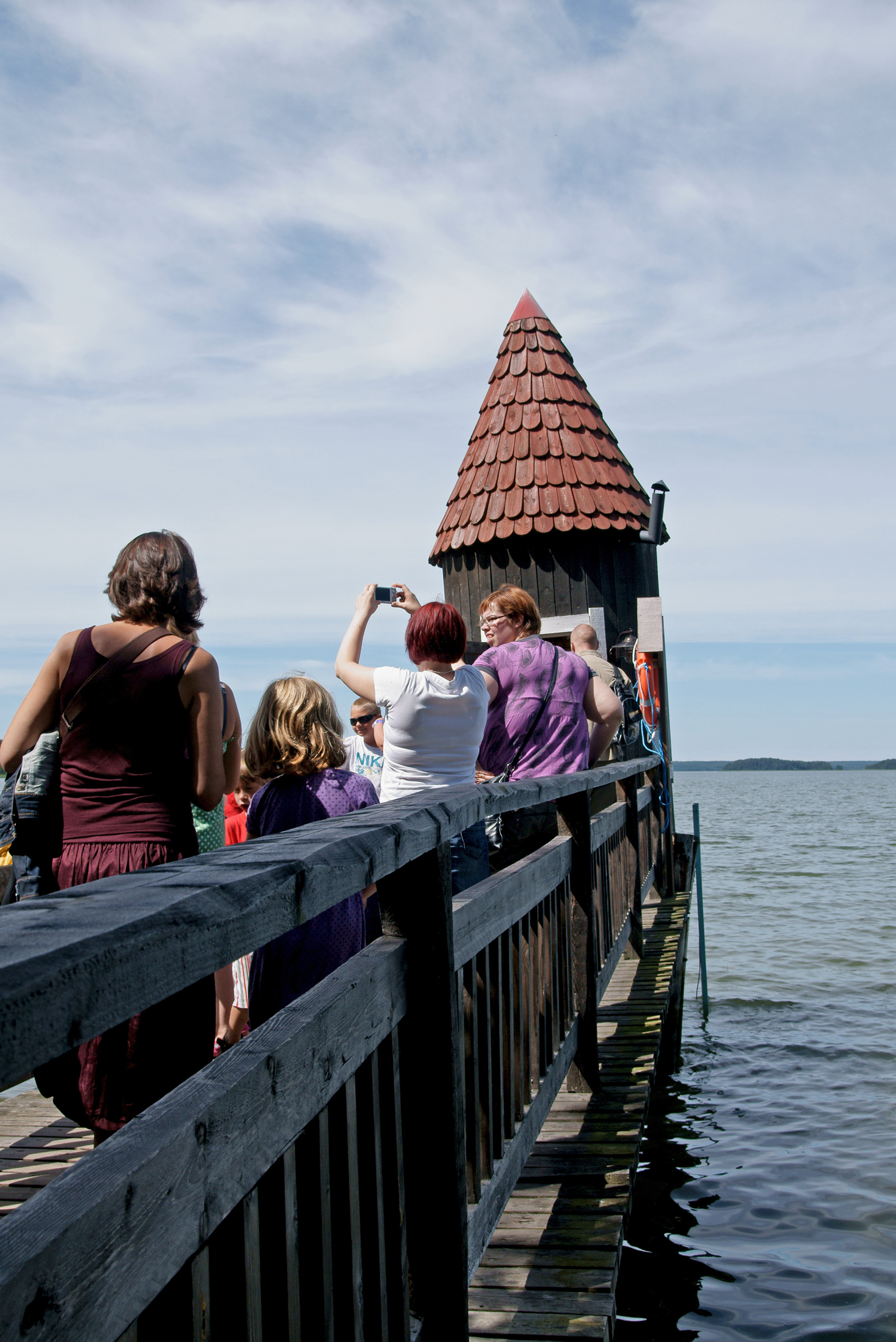
Moomin swimming room in Moomin World, Naantali.

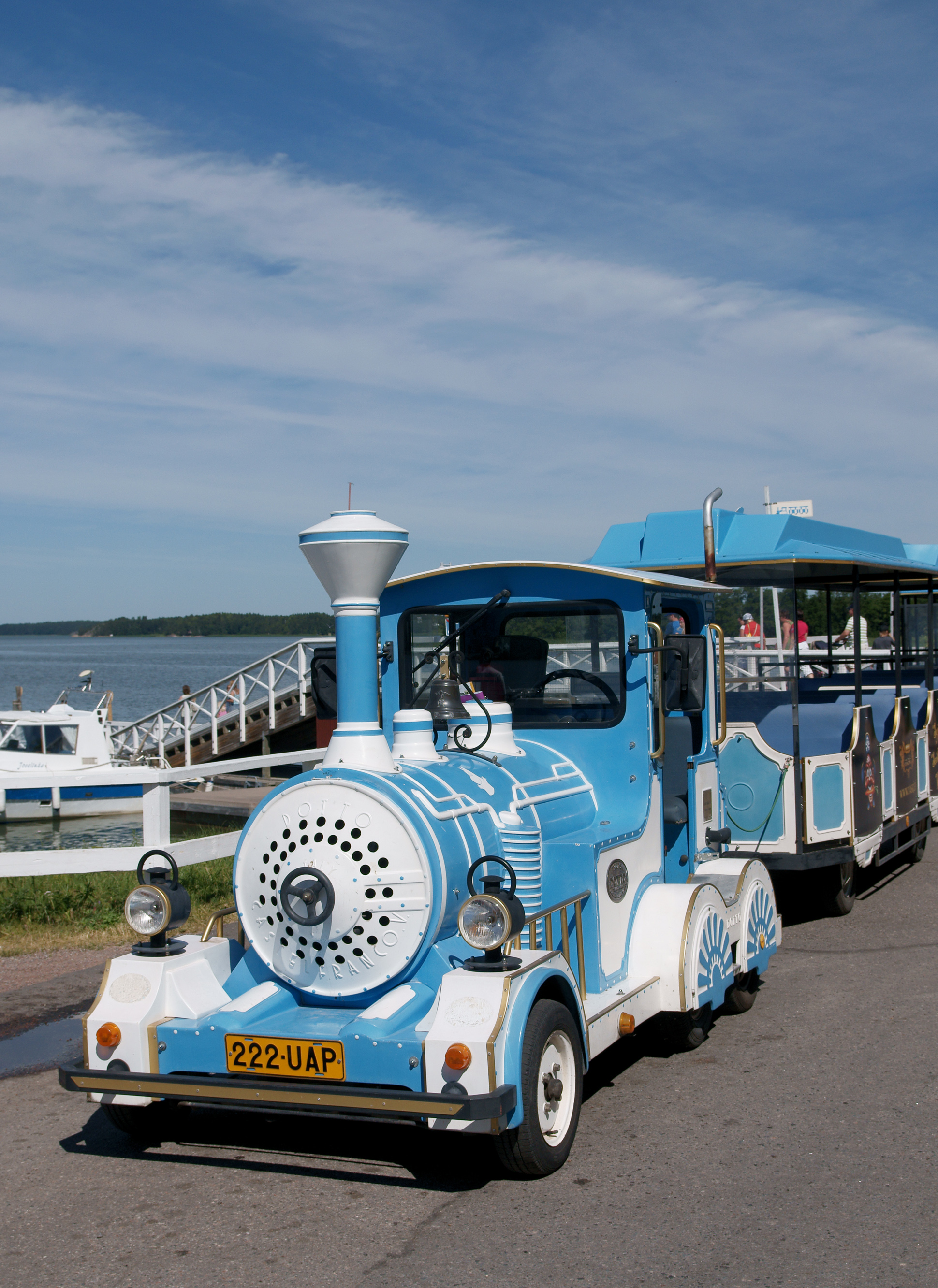
Moomin train in front of the pontoon bridge.

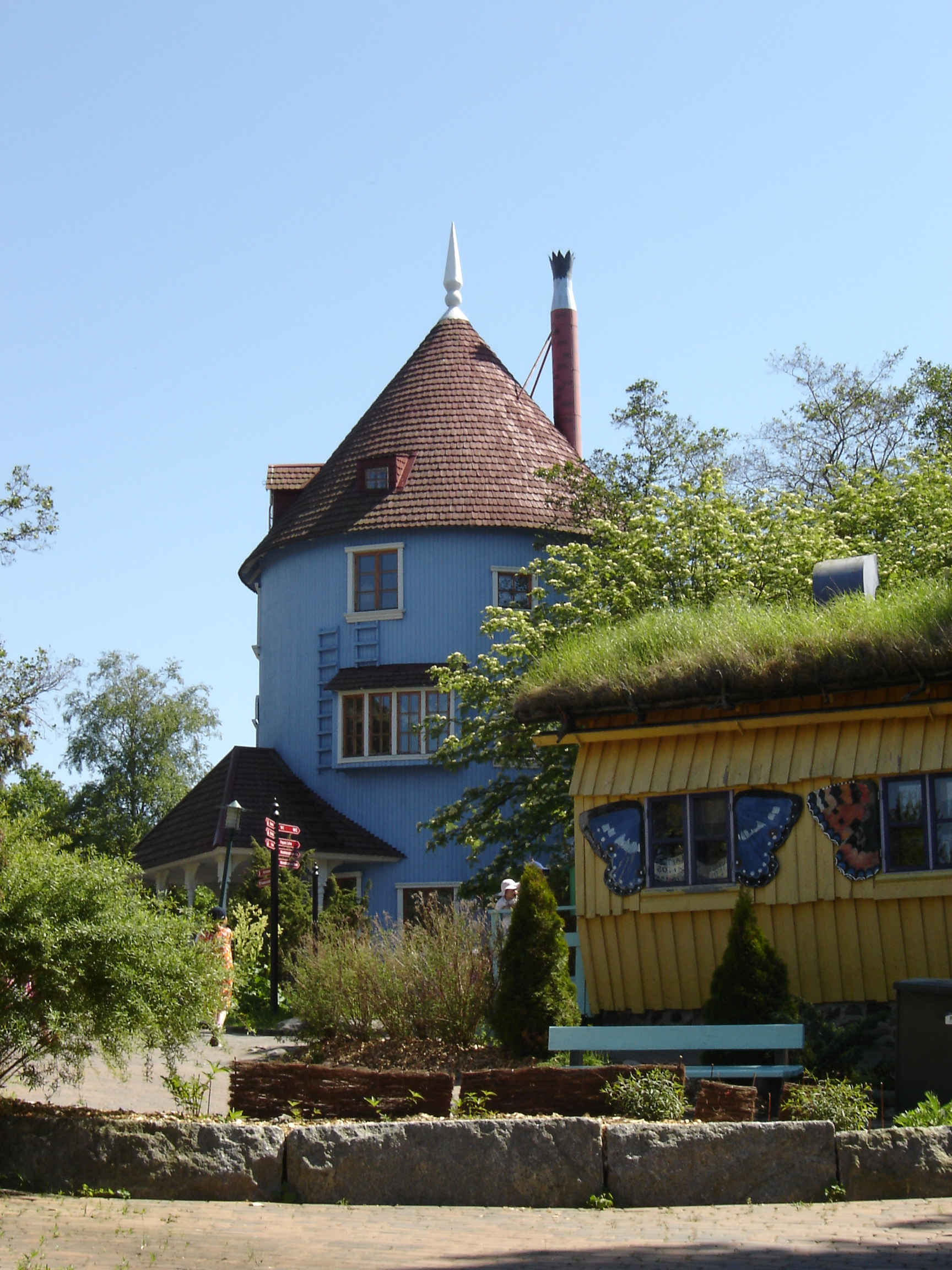
The Moomin house (in the background, blue) and Hemul's house (yellow, on the right)

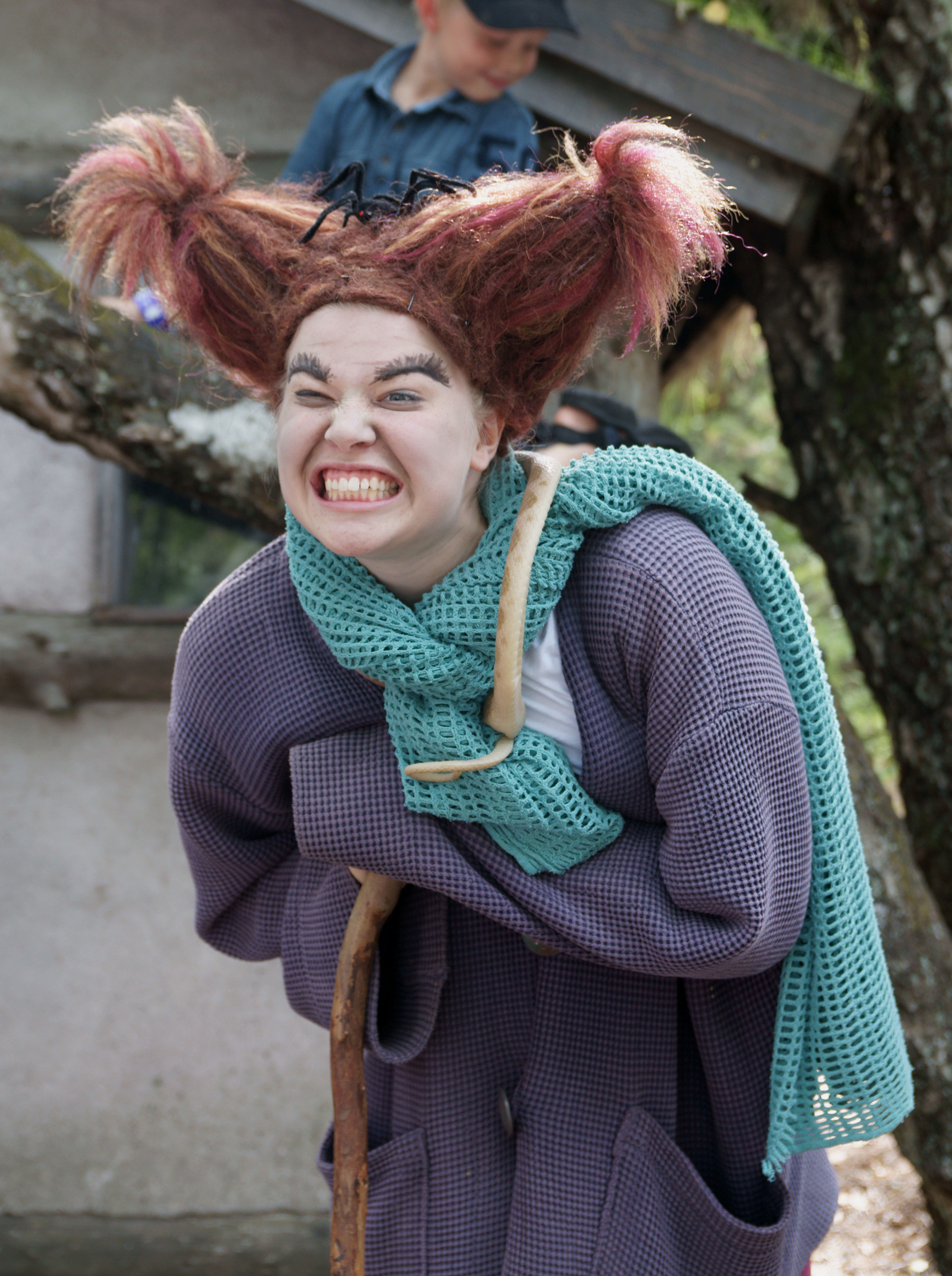
The Witch from Moomins

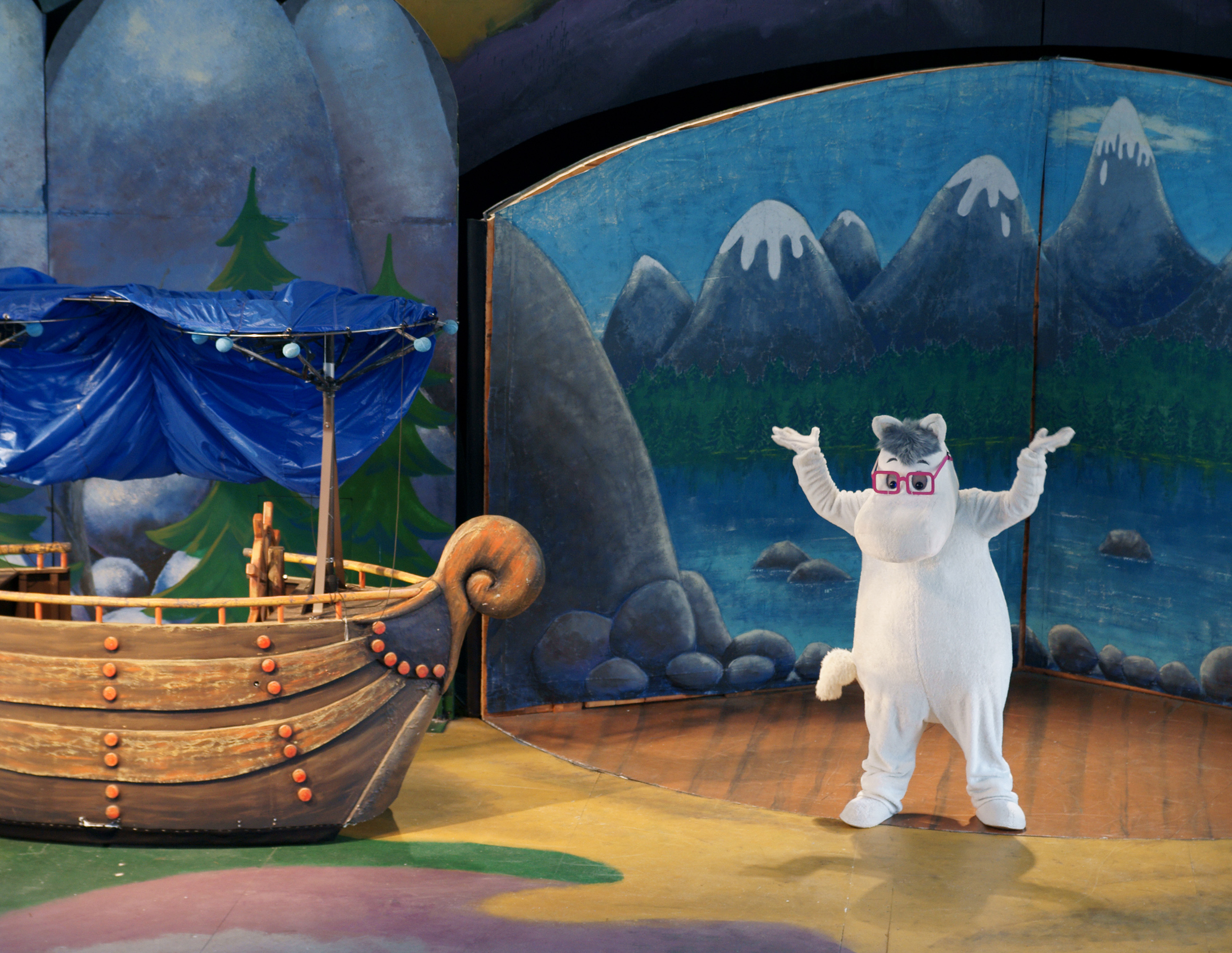
Niisku and the flight rattle in the play Teatteri Emma

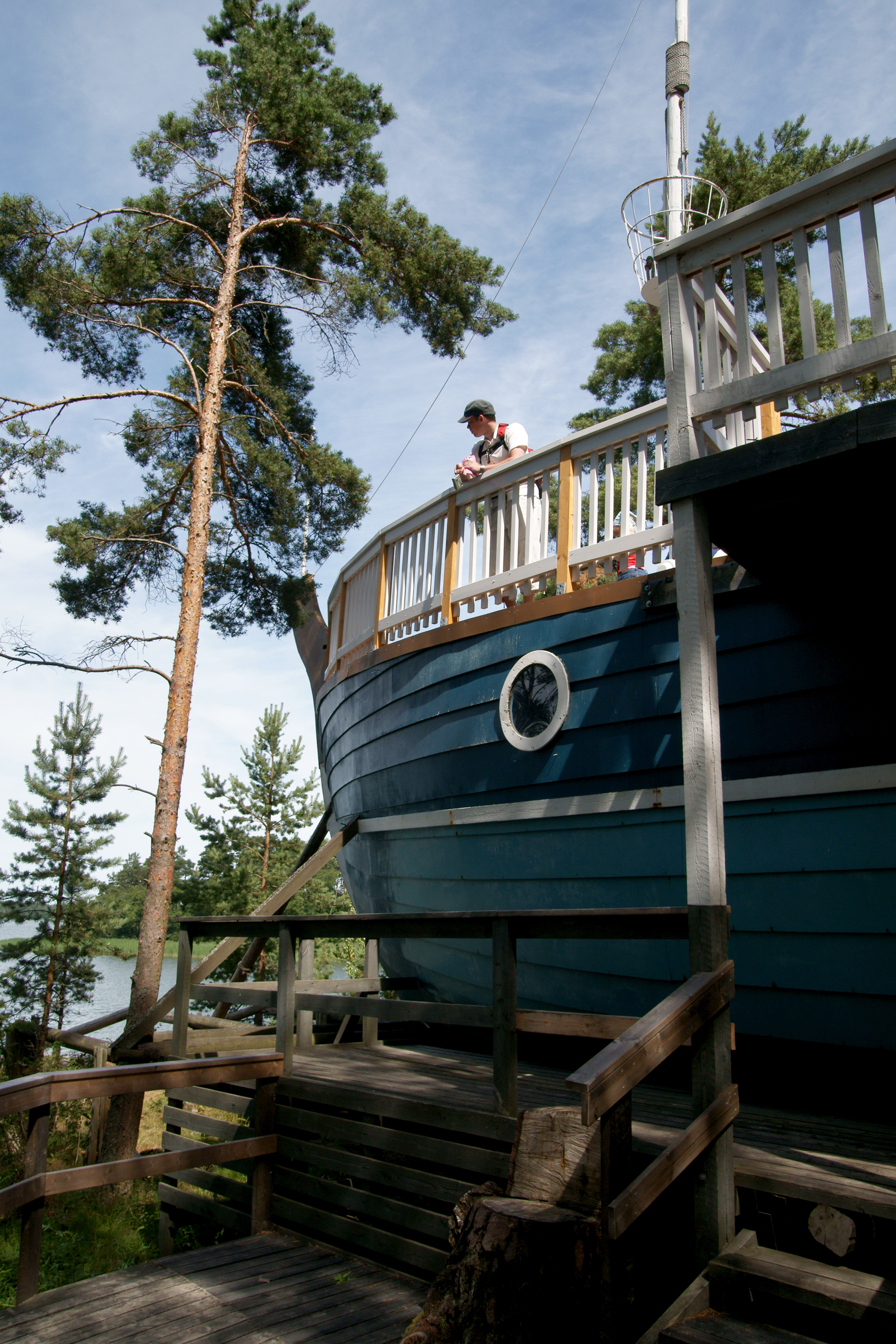

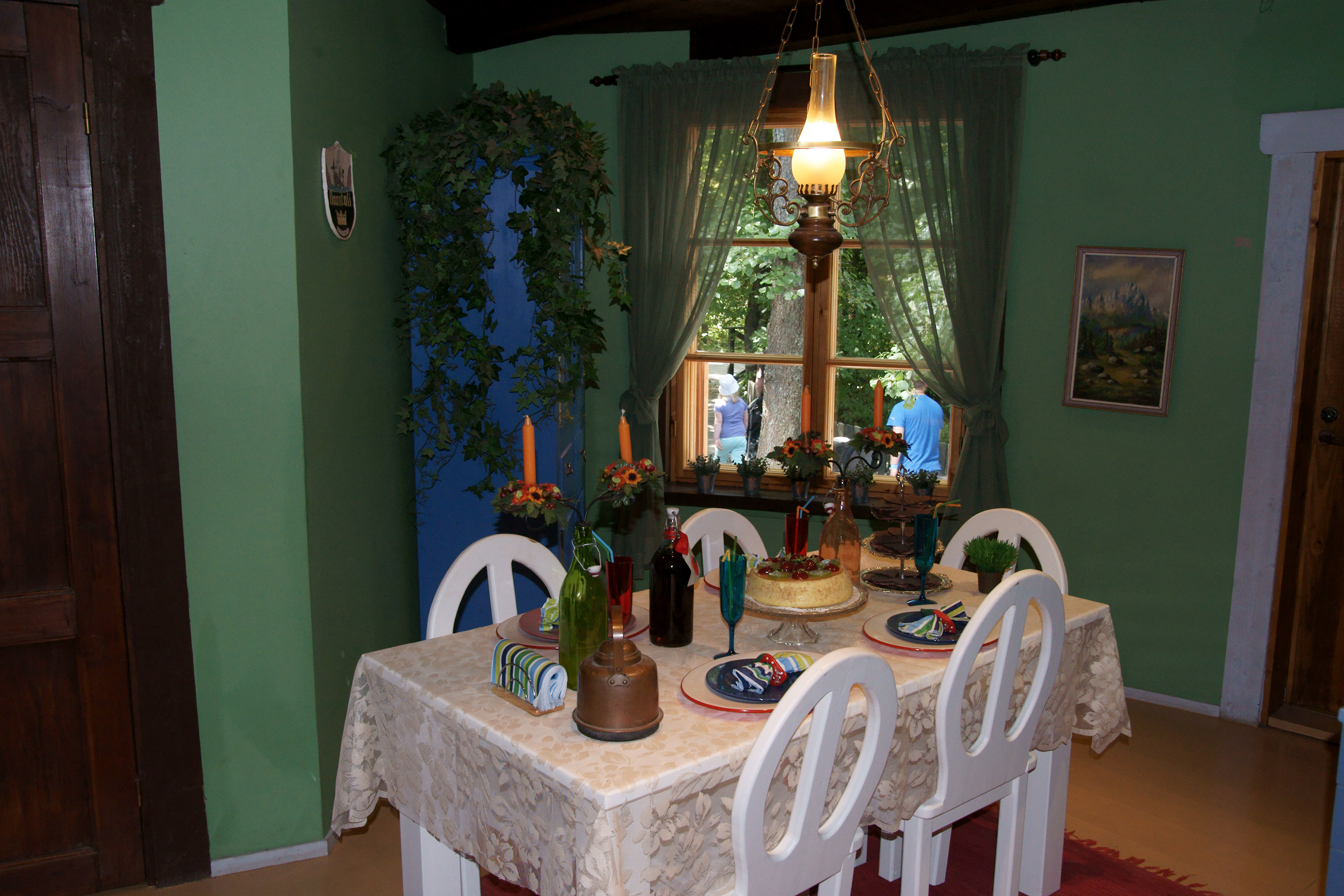
The Moomin House dining room in Moomin World, Naantali.

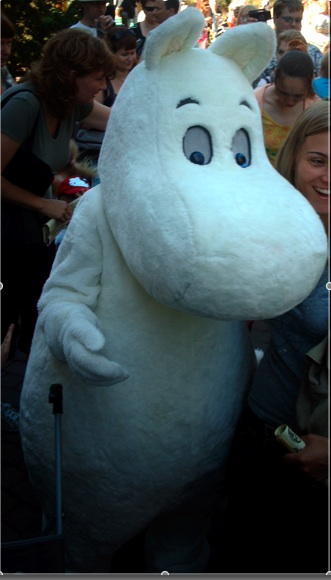
Moomintroll

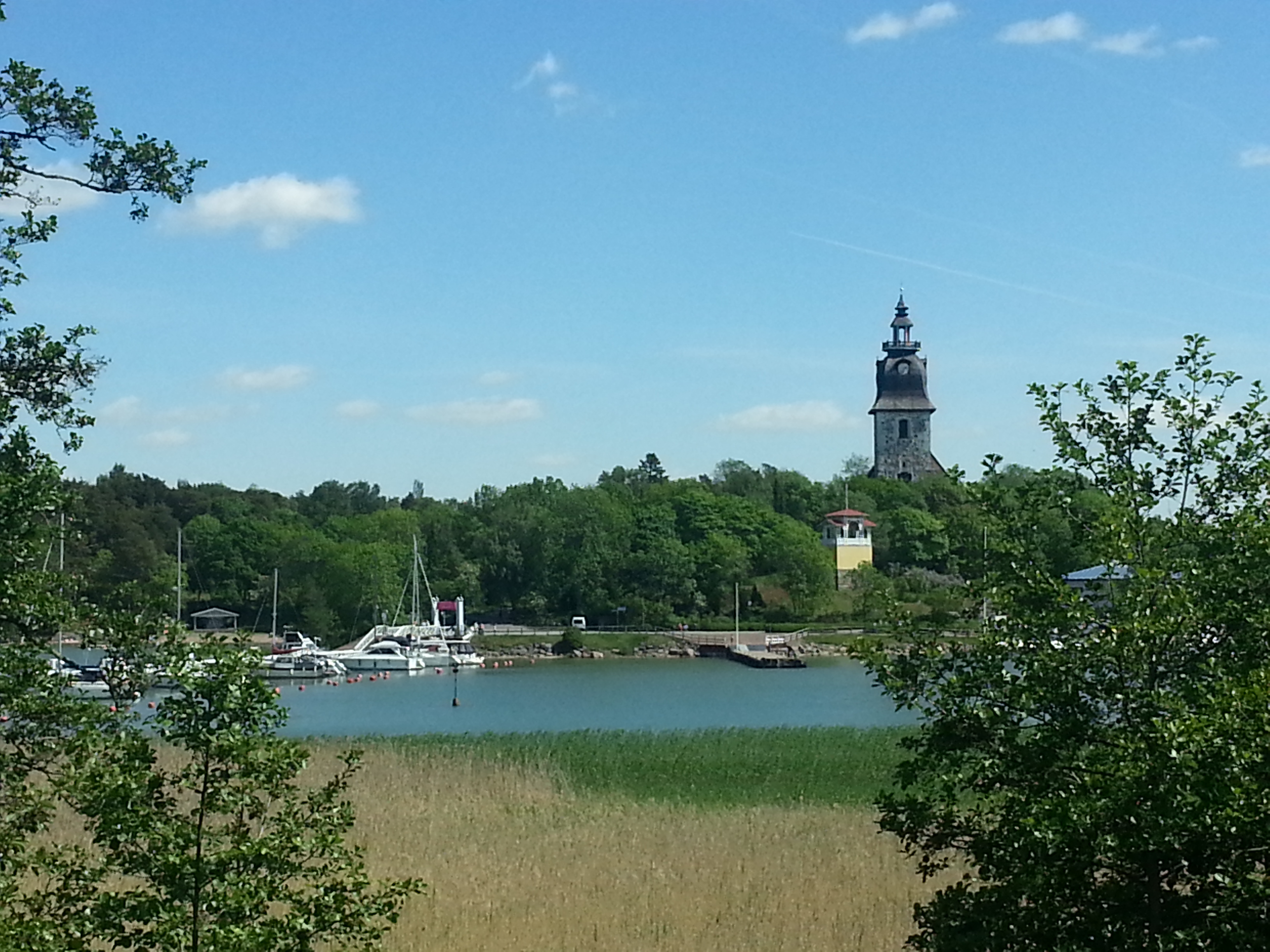
Naantali church, from Moominworld, Finland

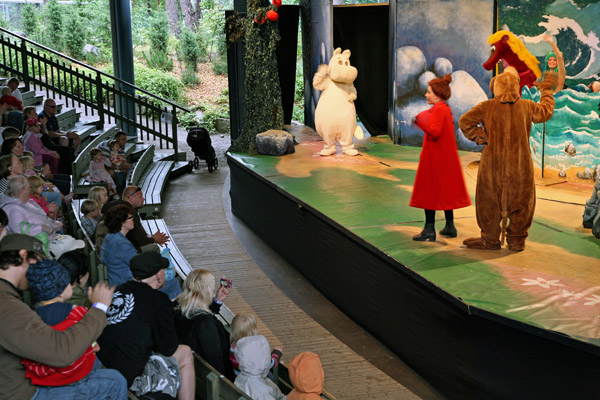
Moomin world, Naantali.

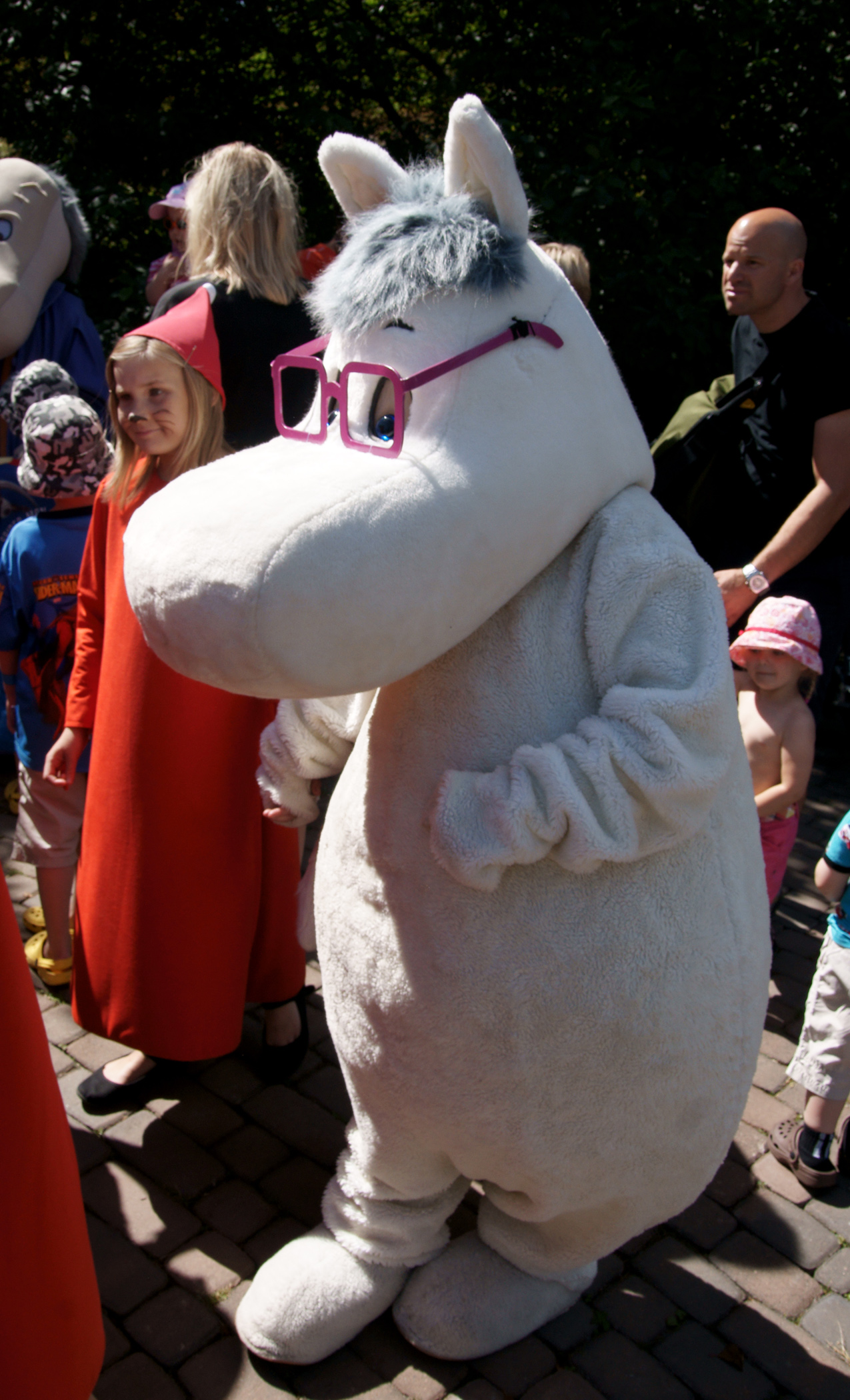
Snork in Moomin World theme park, Naantali, Finland.

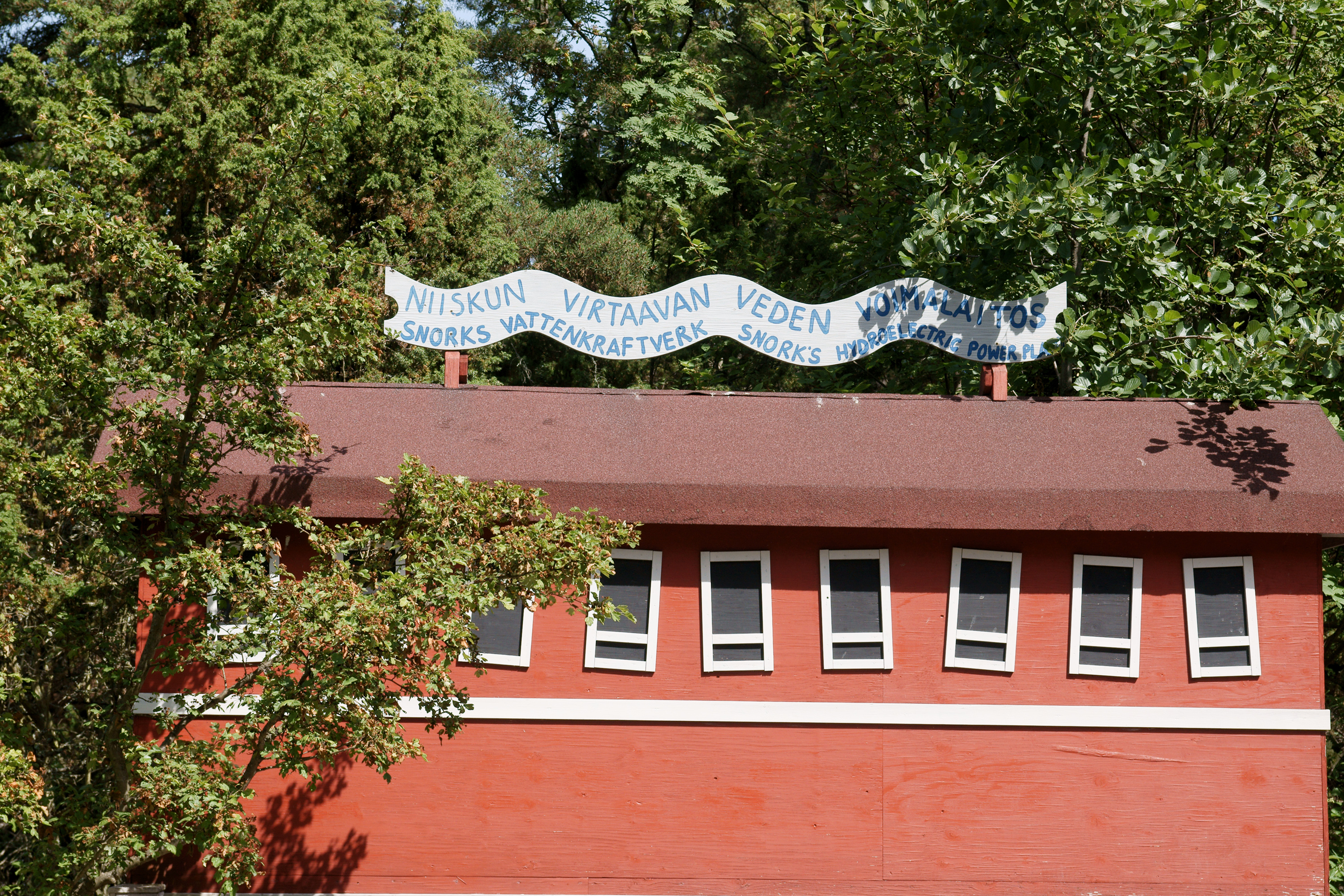
Niisku's flowing water power plant in Moominworld, Naantali.

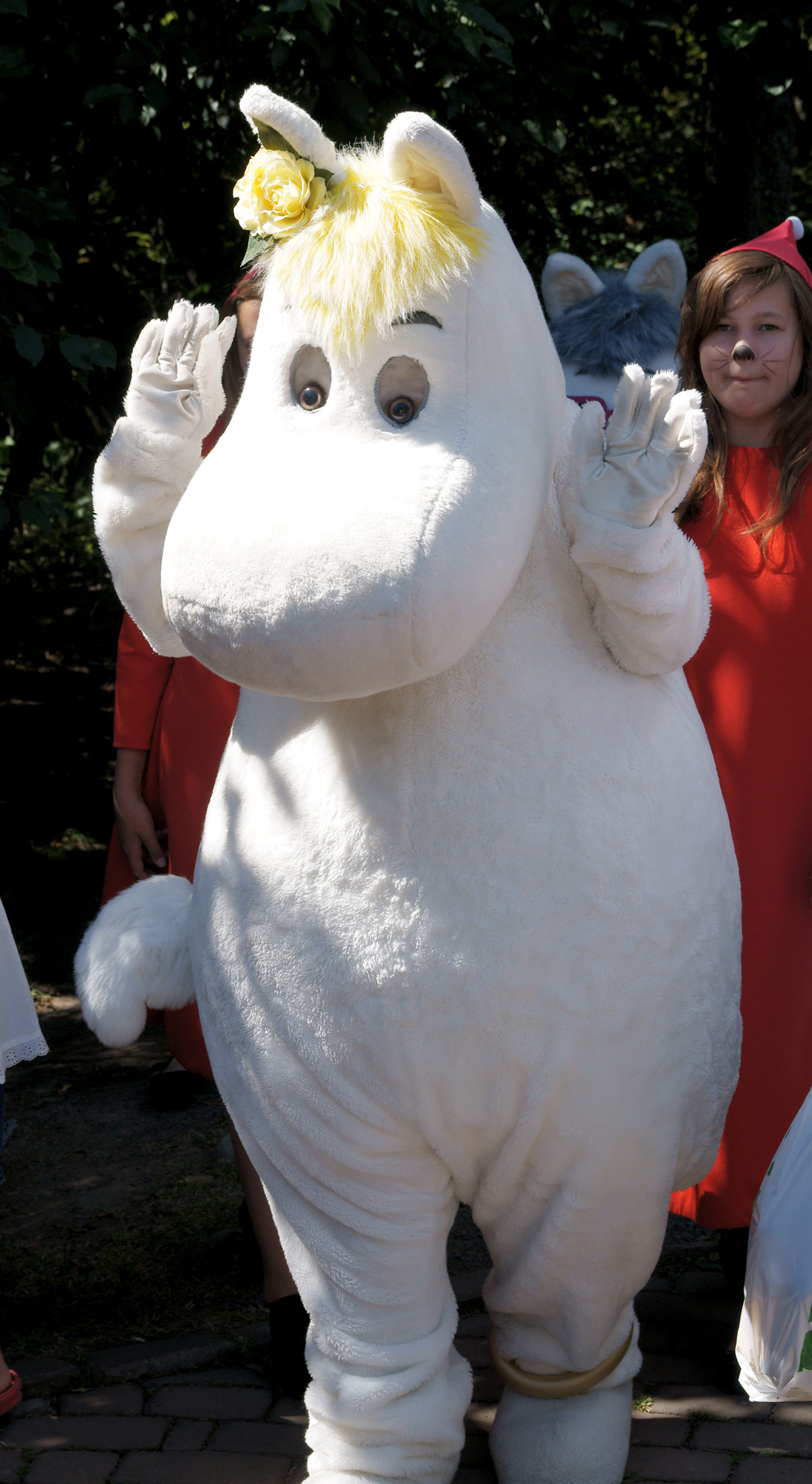
Snork Maiden in Moomin World theme park, Naantali, Finland.

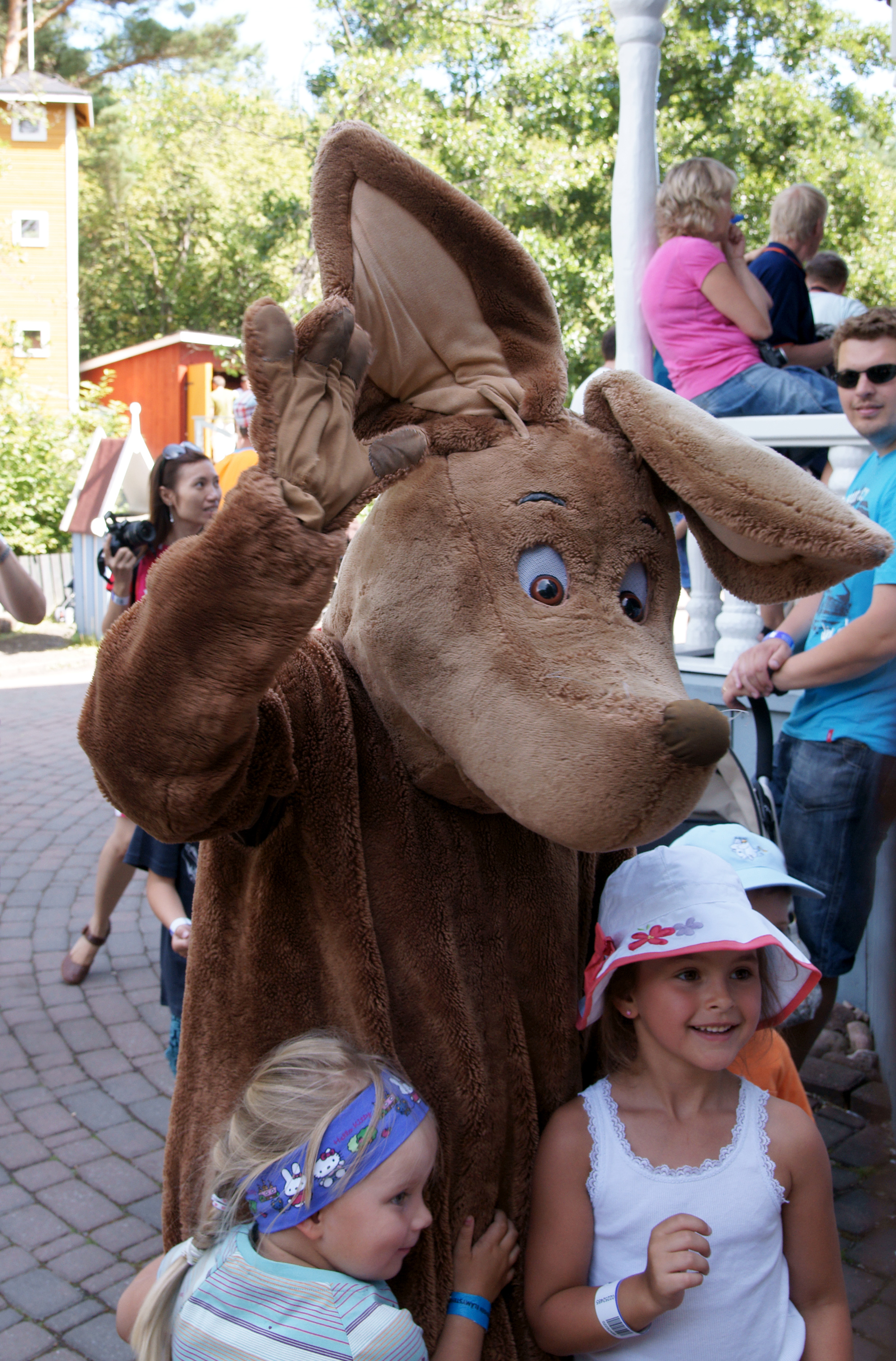
Sniff in Moomin World, Naantali.

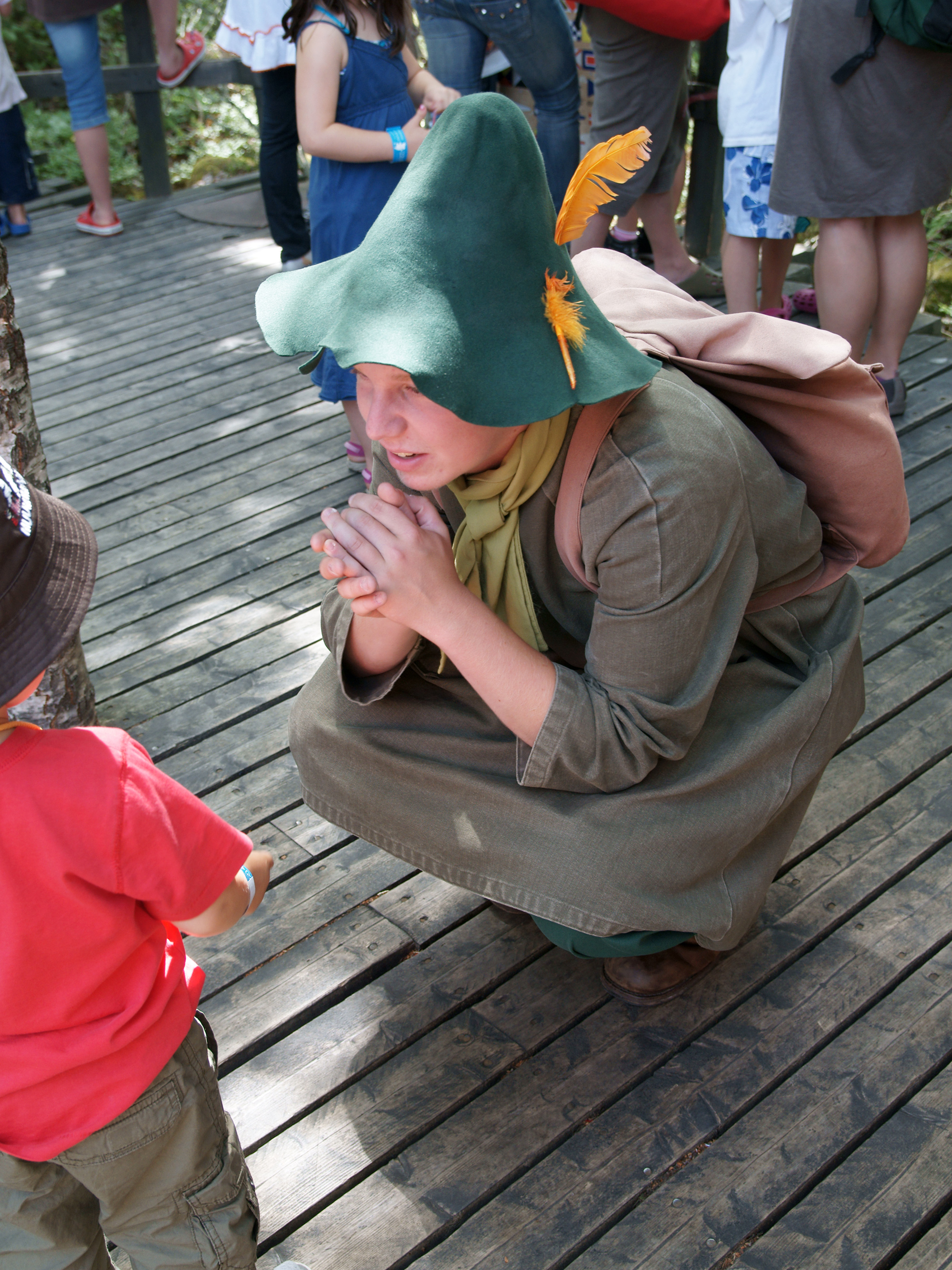
Snufkin

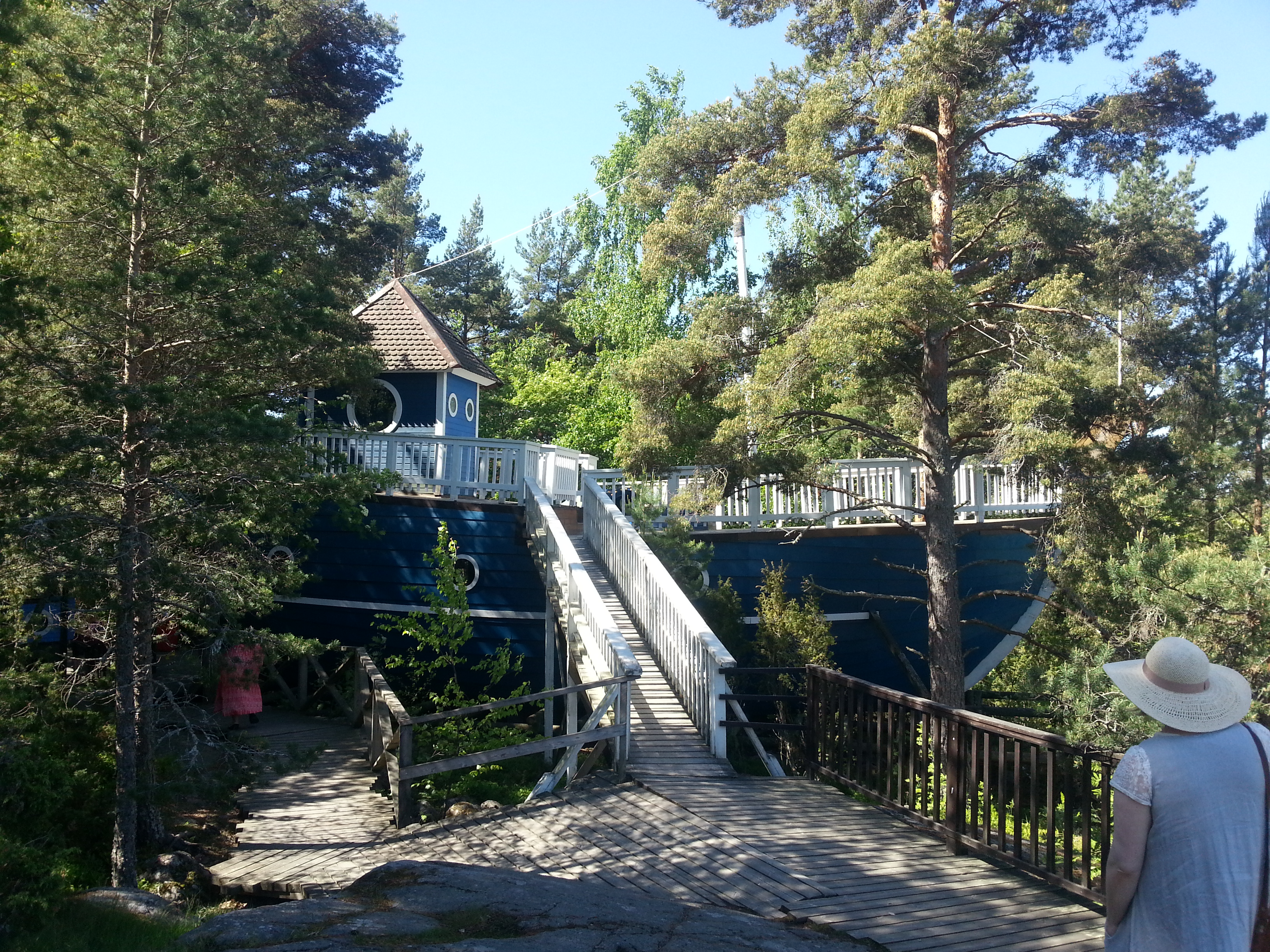
Moominpappa's boat, the Oshun Oxtra (Ocean Orchestra), Moominworld, Finland

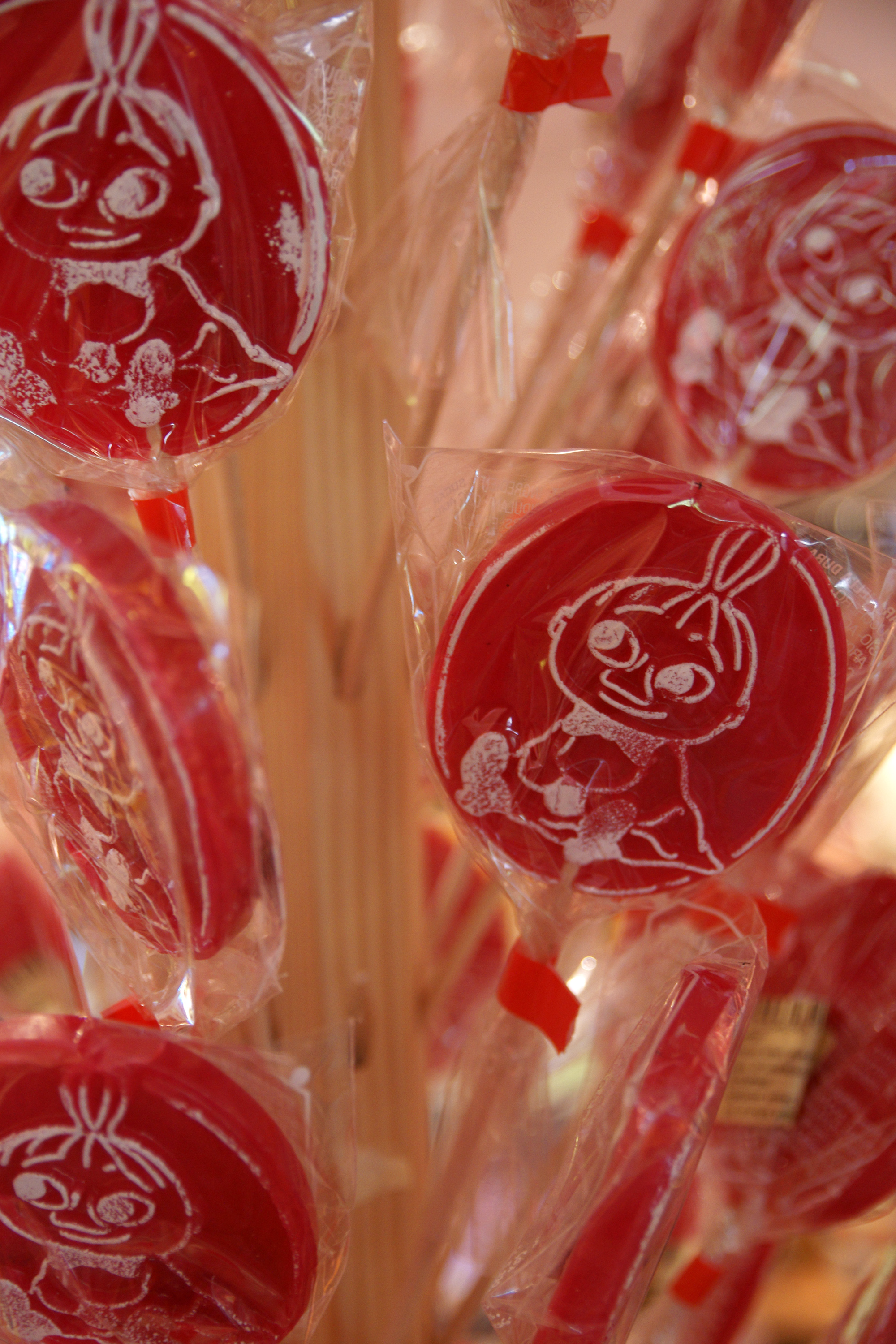
Little My -lollipops in Muumimaailma, Naantali.

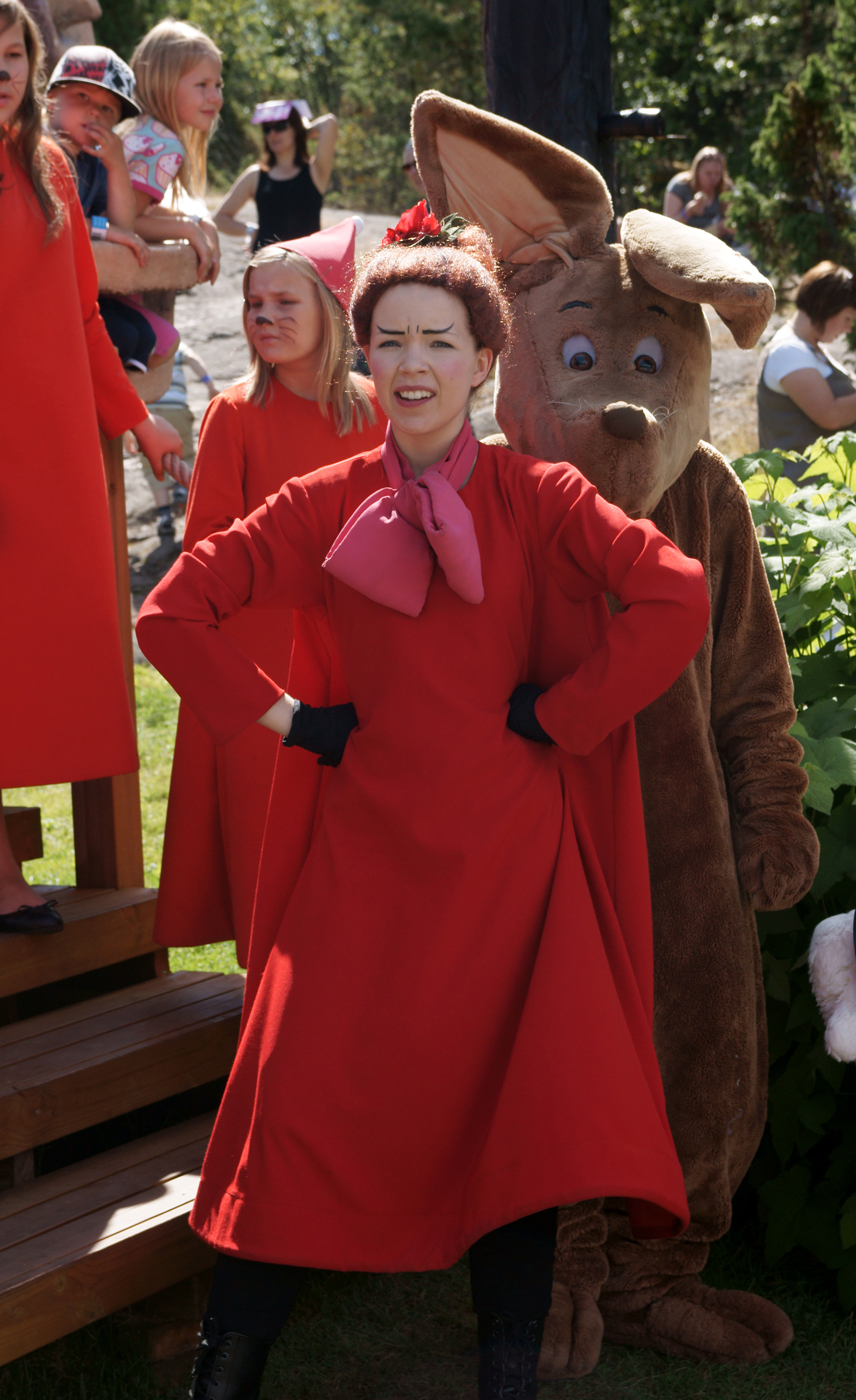
Little My in Moomintroll world, Naantali.

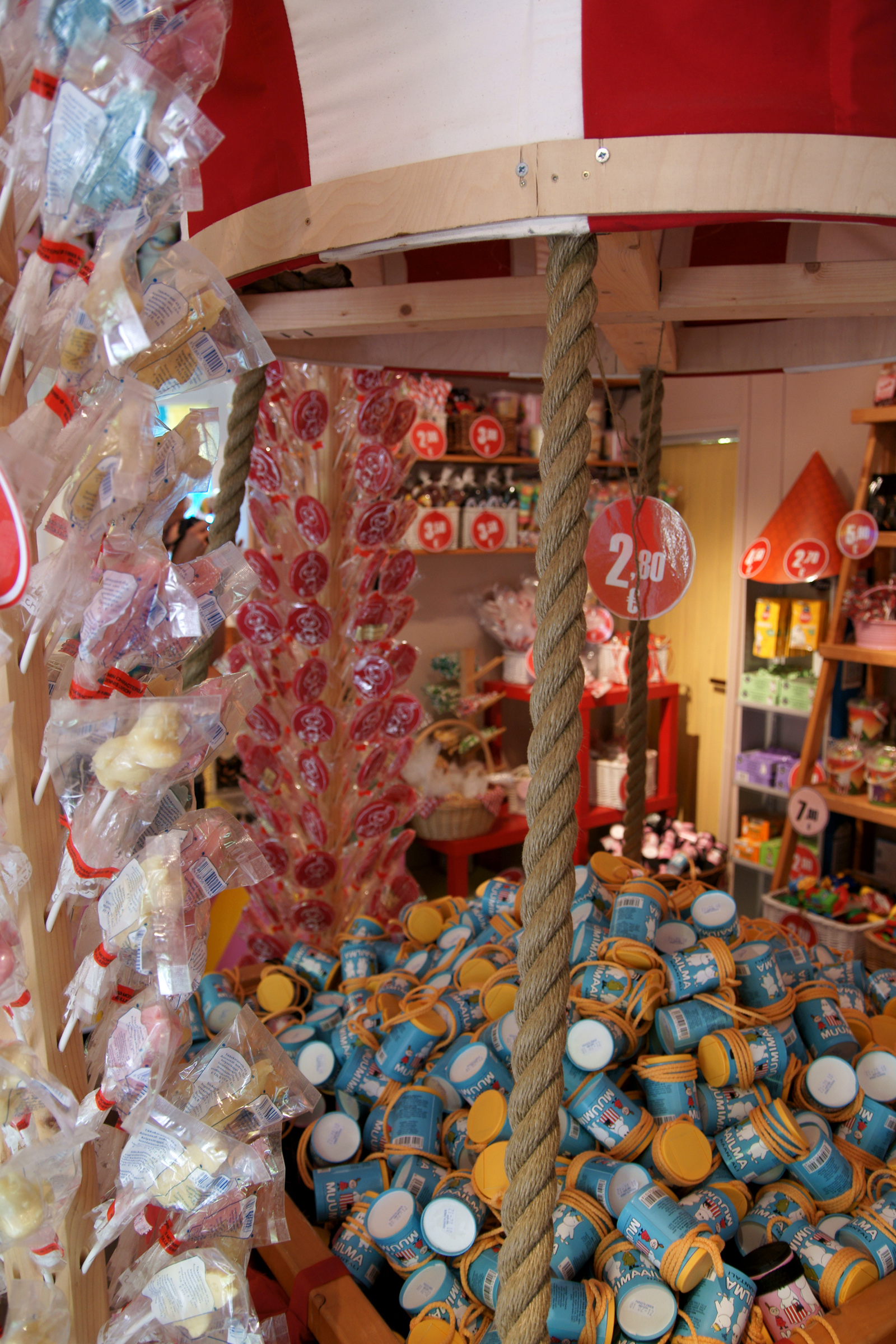
Pikku Myyn nami sweet shop in Moomin world, Naantali.

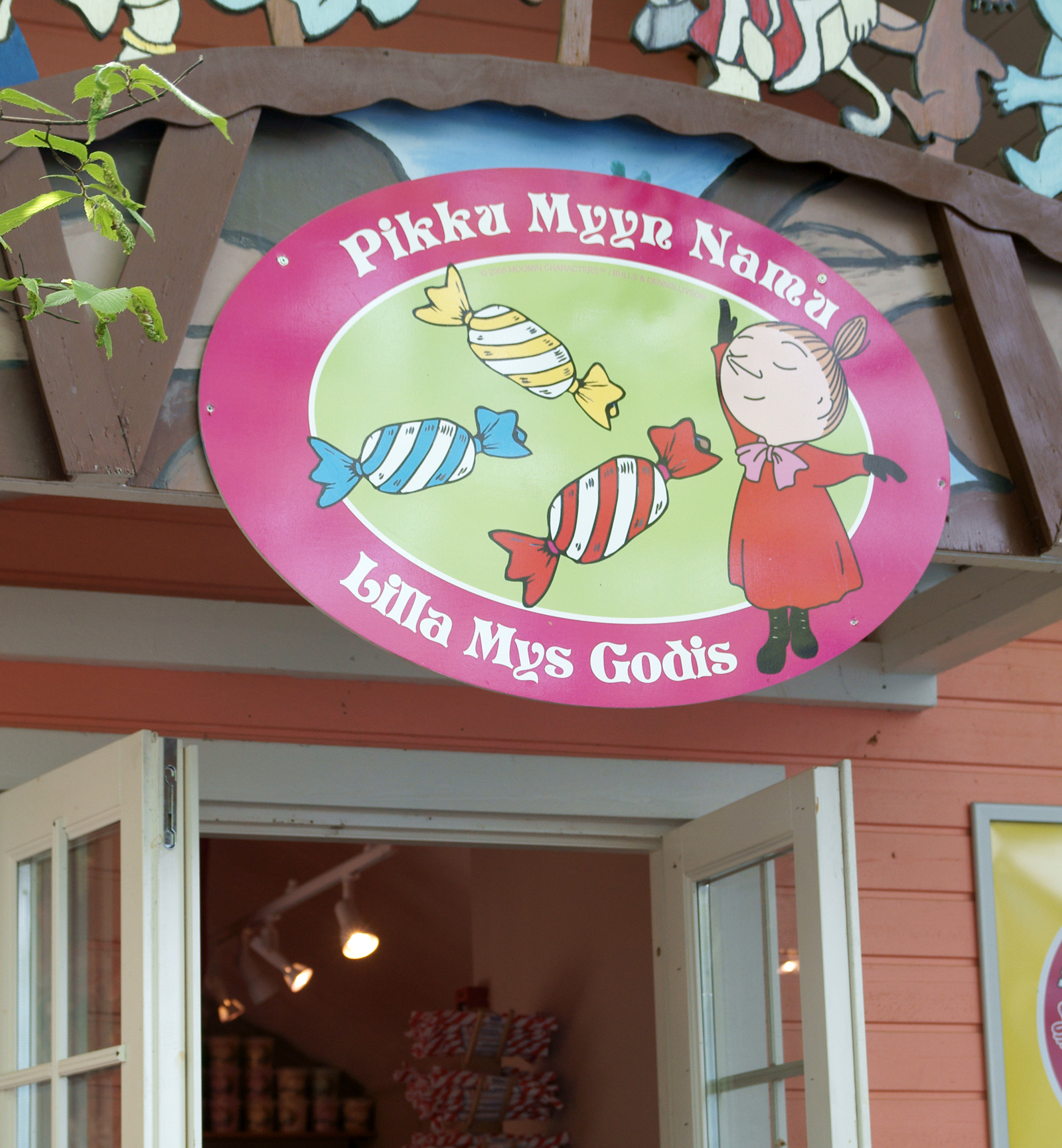
Pikku Myyn nami sweet shop in Moominmaailma, Naantali.

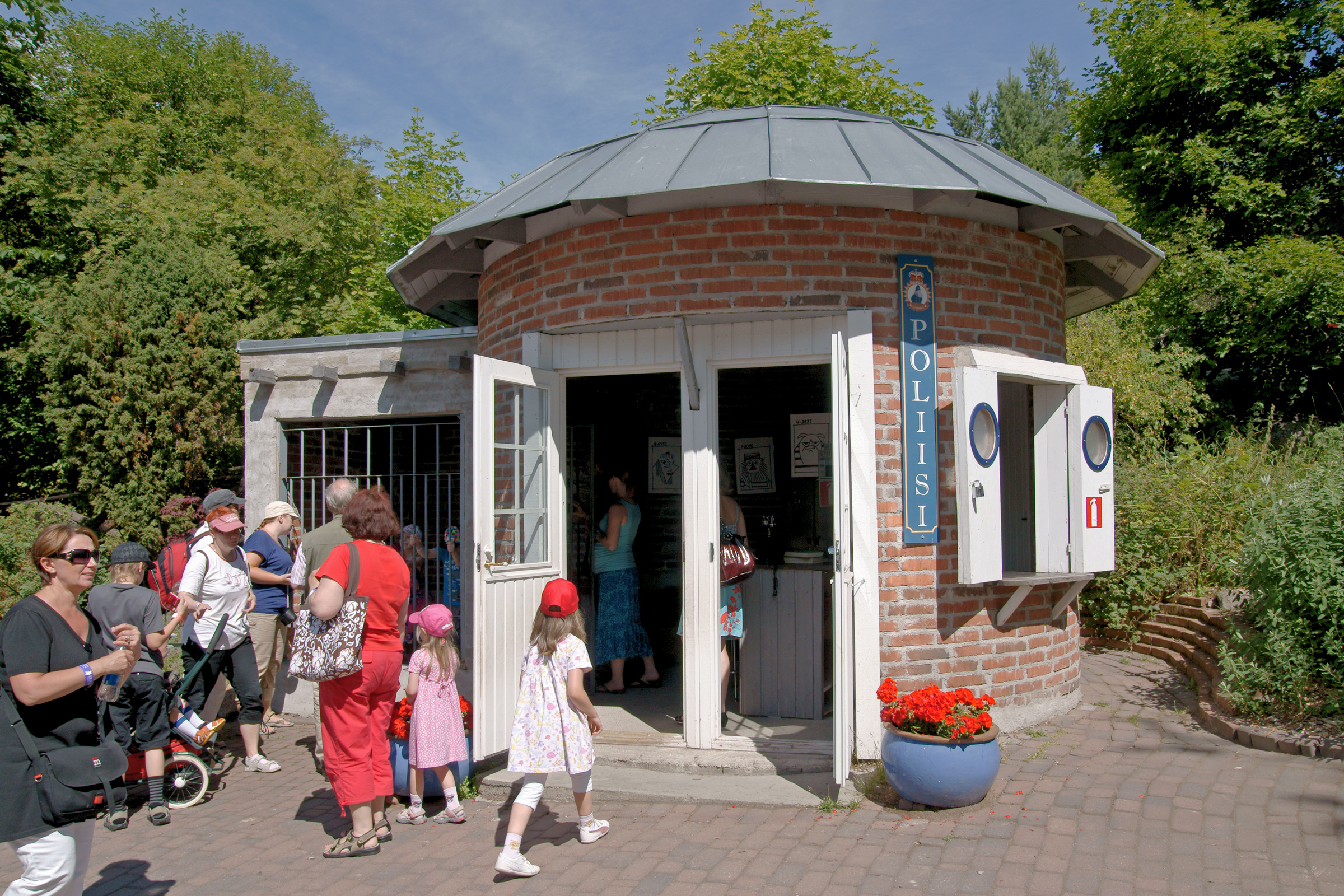
Police station in Moomin world, Naantali.

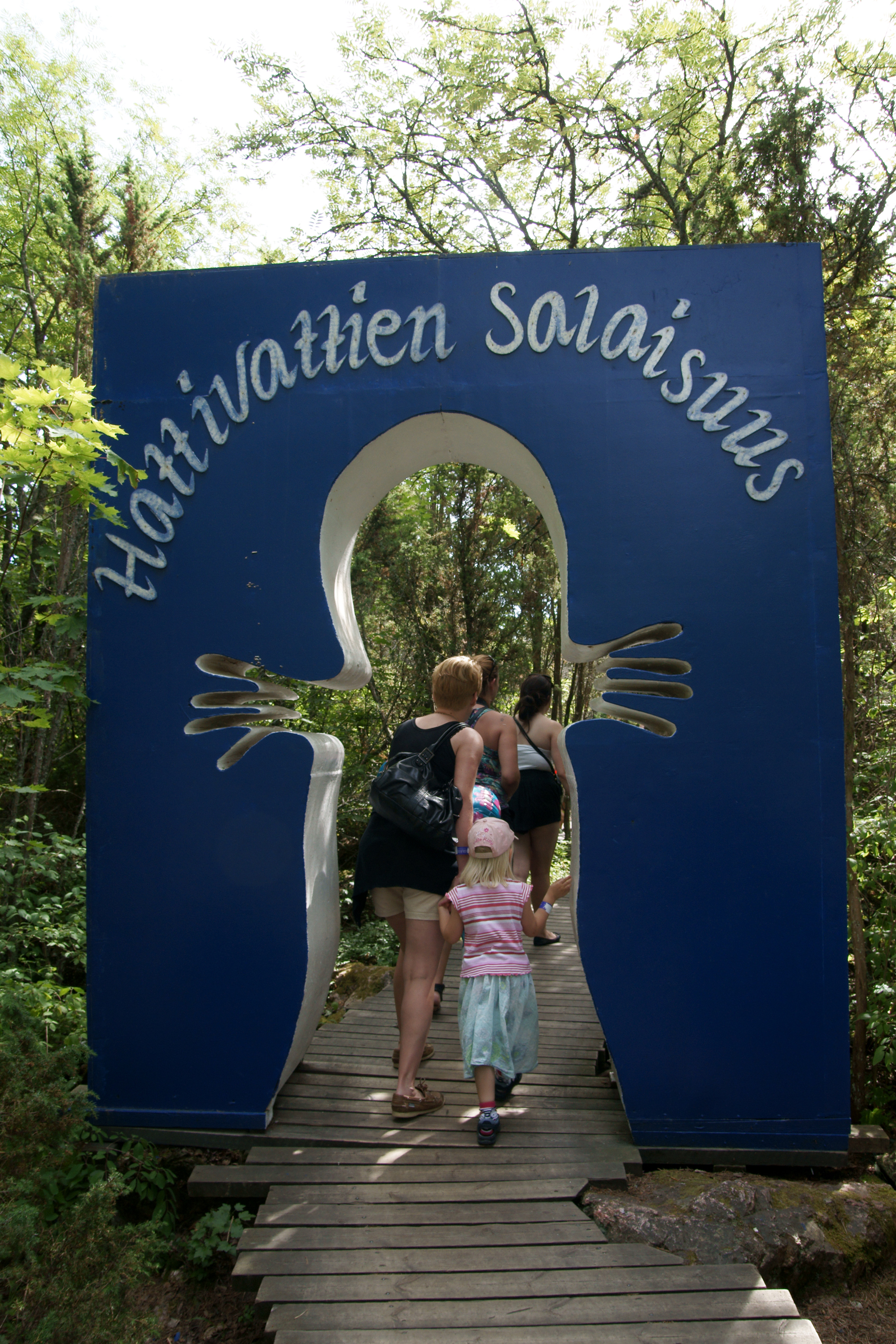
The gateway to Hattivattie's secret in Moomin World, Naantali.

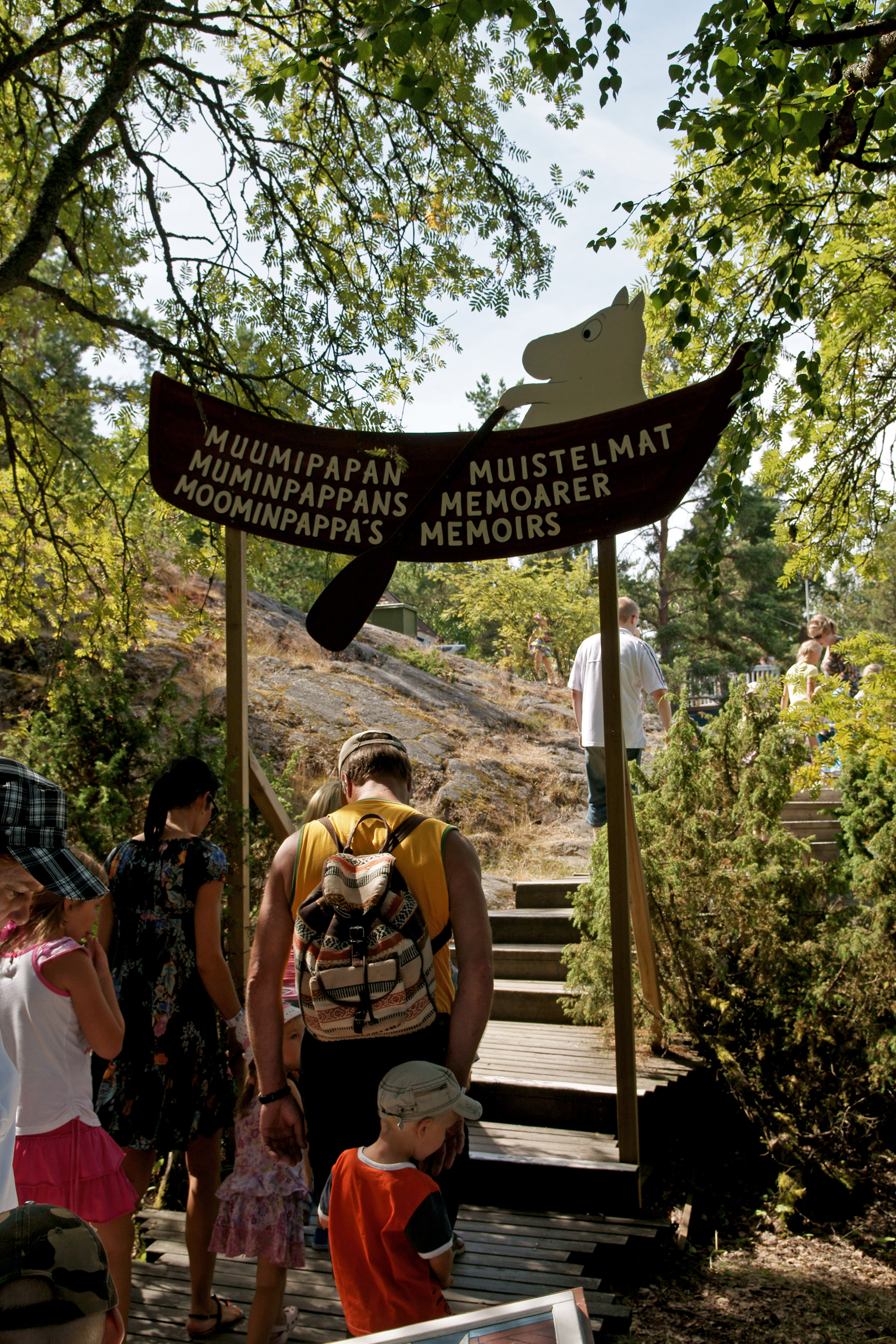
Gateway to Moominpapa's memoirs in Moomin World, Naantali.

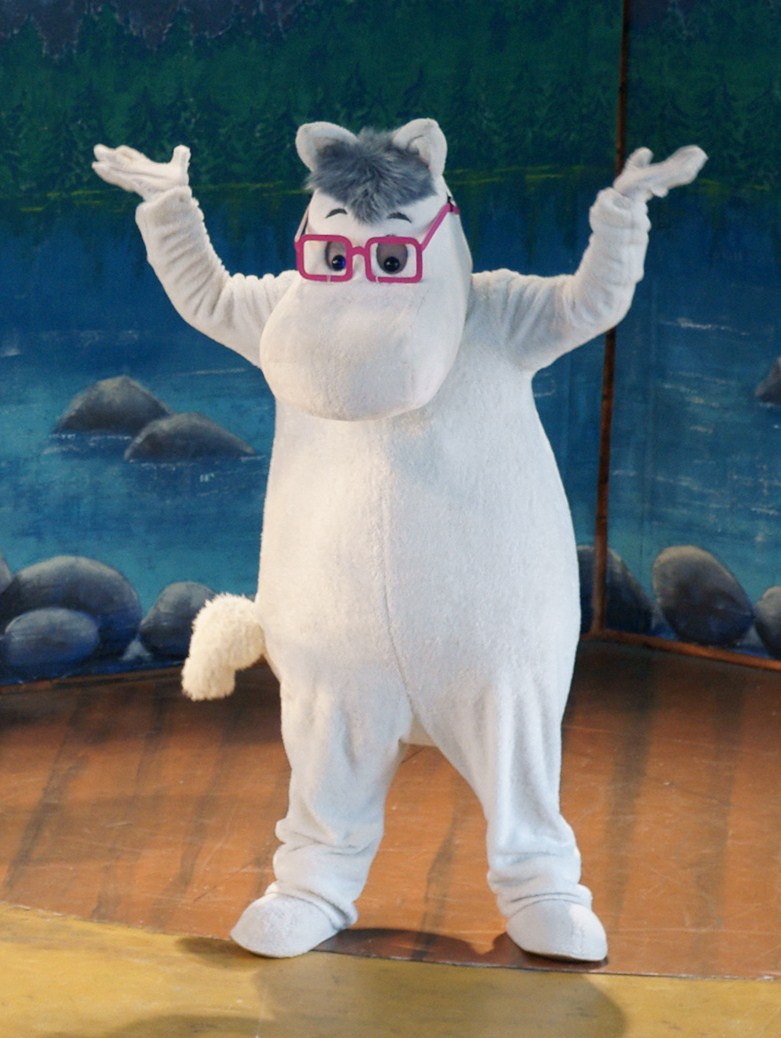
Twinkle from the Moomins.

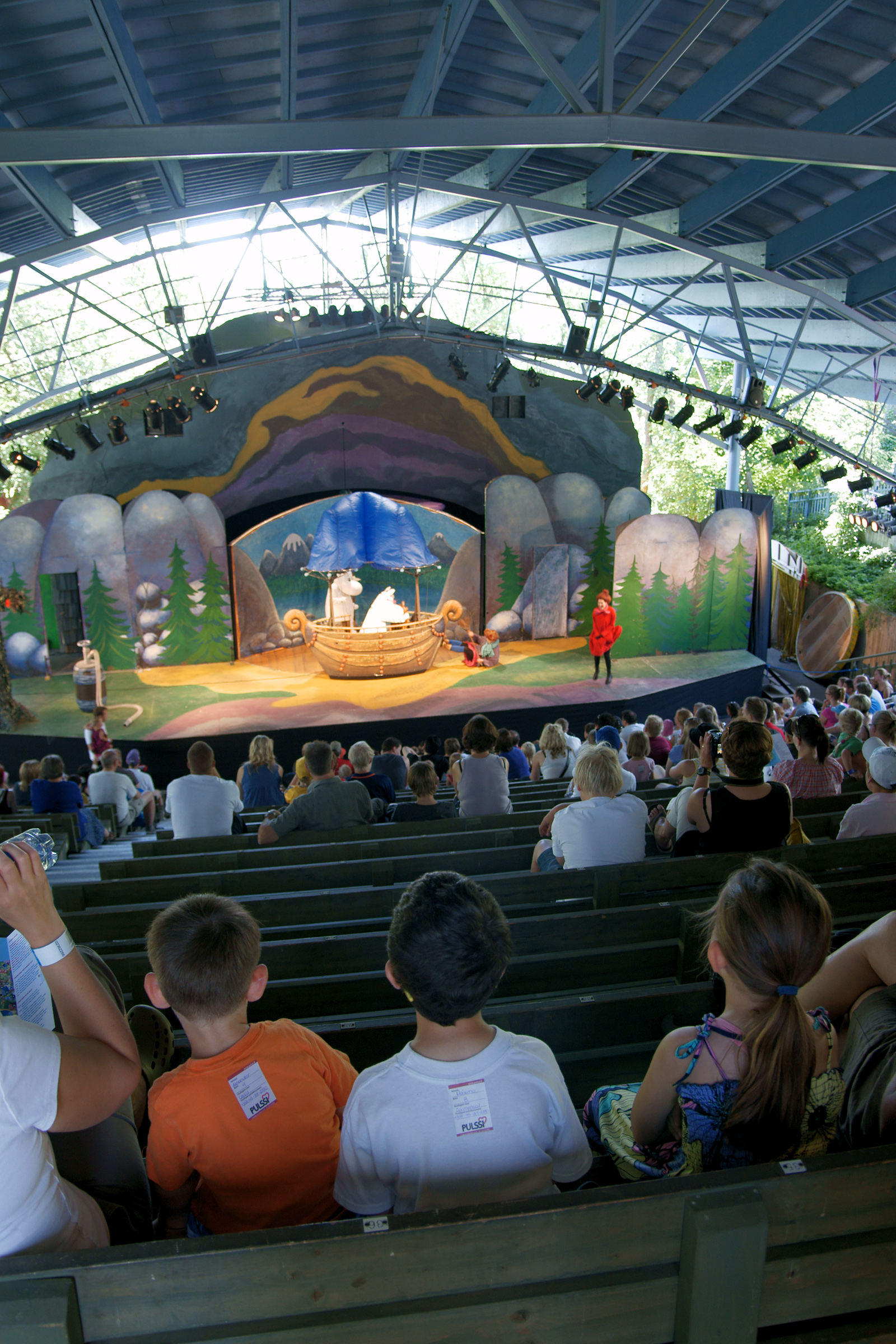
The Moomin show is going on at Teatteri Emma.

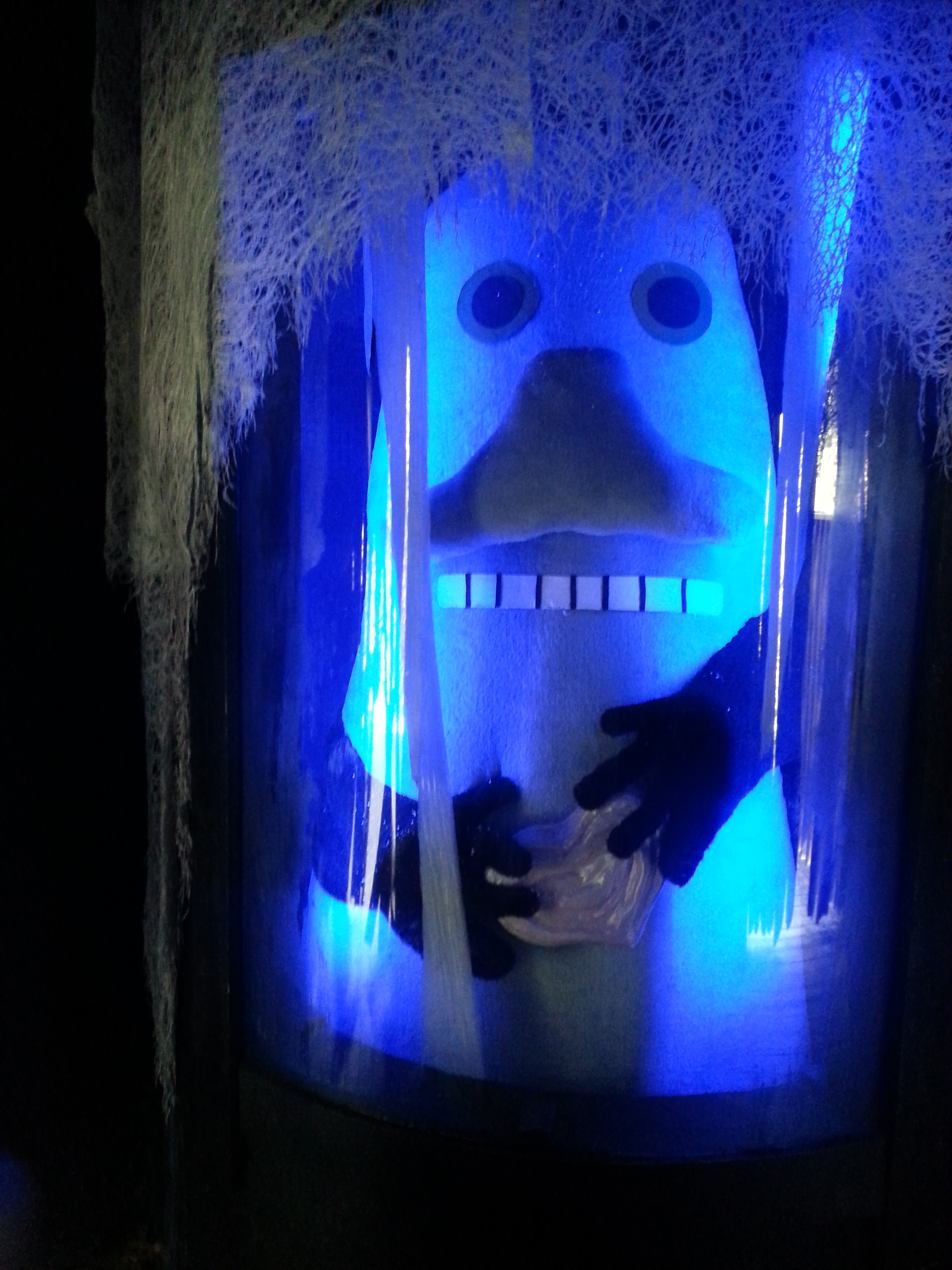
The Groke in her cave, Moominworld, Finland

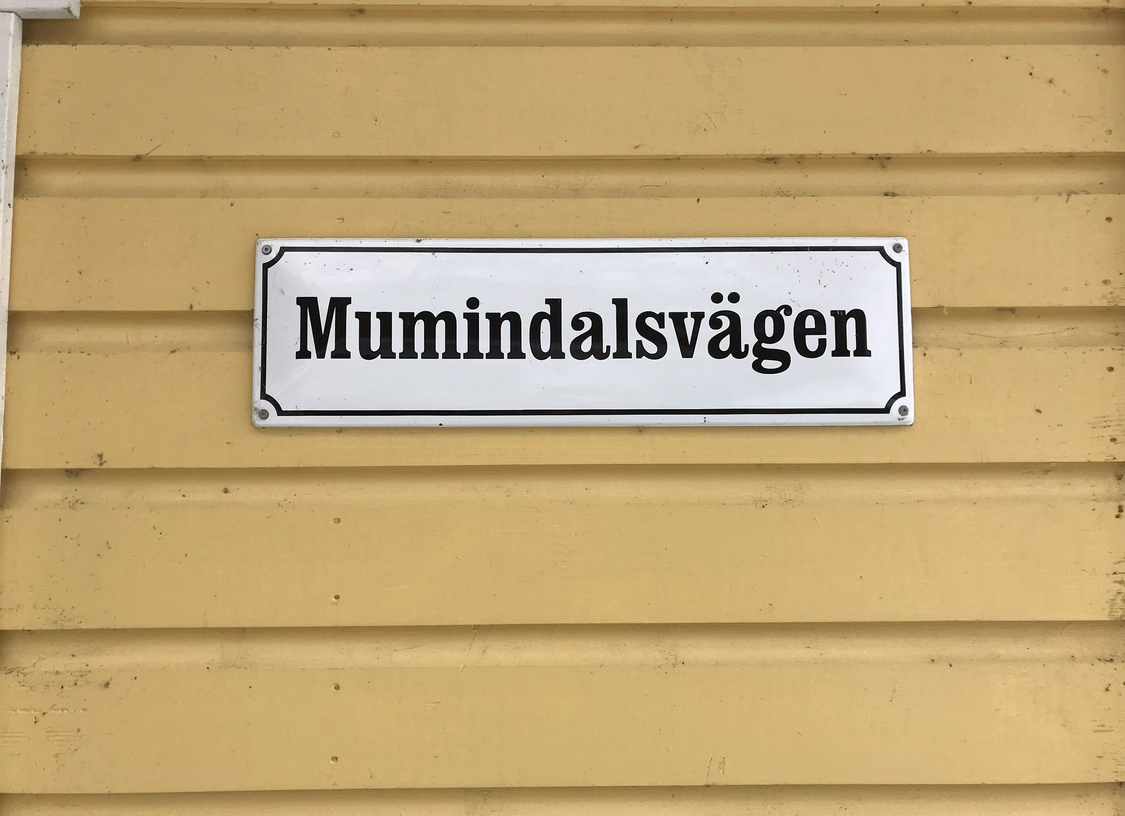
Road sign in the Moominworld, in Naantali.

== See also ==
- Moomin Ice Cave
- Moomin Museum
