= Tove Jansson's writing style =

Tove Jansson, known for her Moomin books, wrote equally for adults, while several of her children's books have been described as suitable for both children and adults. She dealt with serious themes of life and death in what scholars and critics have described as a deceptively light writing style.

== Context ==
The Finland Swedish artist, cartoonist and writer Tove Jansson is principally known as the author of the Moomin books. Critics have interpreted several of the Moomin characters as being inspired by real people, especially members of the author's family and close friends, and Jansson spoke in interviews about the backgrounds of, and possible models for, her characters.

== Writing for children and adults ==
Tales from Moominvalley is certainly a Moomin book, but when it appeared, its reviewers including Gudrun Mörne, Bo Carpenan, and Lars Bäckström at once asked whether it was intended for children or for adults. Justifying the award of the 1963 Stockholms-Tidningen prize, Per Olof Sundman stated that the book was definitely for children, but added that "in all their deceptiveness, their poetic gentleness, [and] their bizarre and sometimes slightly macabre fancies" they were also suitable for adults. The scholar of children's literature Boel Westin comments that this illustrates "Tove's camouflage thinking". Tuula Karjalainen in her biography of Jansson similarly comments that Tales from Moominvalley, Moominpappa at Sea, and Moominvalley in November were "written as much for adults as for children." The scholar of English and women's studies Nancy Huse concurs, writing that Tales from Moominvalley is "possibly Jansson's masterpiece", based, she suggests, on Jansson's close connection with her child readers, including through her correspondence with them. Huse notes Jansson's "wish to respect childhood as a period relatively free of adult pressures", alongside "her contradictory creation of fantasies which portray the full [adult] emotional range of human life", "no one excluded".

The novelist Ali Smith, reviewing The Summer Book (Swedish: Sommarboken), described it as an astonishing achievement of artistry, "the writing so lightly kept, so simple-seeming, so closely concerned with the weighing of moments that any extra weight of exegesis is too much." Telling the tale of the child and her grandmother in the simplest language, Smith writes, "The threat of brevity, even on this timeless island in this timeless, gorgeous summer, is very marked. But Jansson's brilliance is to create a narrative that seems, at least, to have no forward motion, to exist in lit moments, gleaming dark moments, like lights on a string, each chapter its own beautifully constructed, random-seeming, complete story. Her writing is all magical deception, her sentences simple and loaded; the novel reads like looking through clear water and seeing, suddenly, the depth."

Introducing Jansson's short story collection, A Winter Book, Smith writes that the "slight-seeming stories are really discrete philosophical gifts." In her view, all her short stories are "small masterworks. Each is distilled to an essence." Drawing a parallel with Jansson's statement that one should never keep anything non-essential in a boat, she comments that these stories "could safely weather storms", as they are written with both economy and "the kind of precision that turns any mere clockwork of narrative into something that goes beyond time itself." Smith writes that the brevity of the stories "somehow suggests an eternity, a complete world. It is an extraordinary feat."

In The Sculptor's Daughter, a middle-aged Jansson fictionalises her own childhood. Smith describes the imaginative leap as a "glorious creation of a child-self, with all her cowardice, her jealousies, her funniness, her witty wilfulness, her precocious understanding of the mechanics of art and her unprejudiced filtering of the adult wisdoms fed to her" as "the perfect literary voice."

Everything that Jansson wrote, states Smith, "celebrate[s] the endless, unstoppable, good-natured force of the imagination." The stories, in her view, "light up the dark for miles" around, whether they are facing "age, youth, [or] ... the dark and light seasons", always written with a finely-balanced lightness.

Introducing The True Deceiver, Smith writes that even in a story for eight-year-old children like her 1962 "The Spring Tune", Jansson discusses "the relationships between art, nature, fame and identity; ... the place and role of the artist and of the mysterious sources of creativity". Smith comments that all Jansson's writings could be described as about the interaction of art and nature. She adds that Jansson's style is "minimal, [and] deeply resonant", praising Thomas Teal as well suited to translating such a style into English. She calls The True Deceiver an "unassuming, unexpected, powerful piece of work", the writing "almost deadpan in its clarity and seeming simplicity."

== Sources ==
- Smith, Ali (2006). "Introduction". A Winter Book. Sort Of Books. pp. 11–17. ISBN 978-0-9548995-2-3.
- Smith, Ali (2009) [1982]. The True Deceiver. Sort of Books. pp. 9–20. ISBN 978-0-954-89957-8.
- Karjalainen, Tuula (2016) [2013]. Tove Jansson: Work and Love. Penguin Books. ISBN 978-0-141-97882-6.
- Westin, Boel (2014). Tove Jansson Life, Art, Words: The Authorised Biography. Translated by Mazzarella, Silvester. Sort of Books. ISBN 978-1-908745-45-3.
