= The Field of Stones =

1989 novel by Tove Jansson

- First edition
- Author: Tove Jansson
- Original title: Stenåkern
- Language: Swedish
- Genre: Novel
- Publisher: Bonniers
- Publication date: 1984
- Publication place: Finland
- Preceded by: The True Deceiver
- Followed by: Fair Play

The Field of Stones (in the original Swedish Stenåkern) is a novel by the Finland Swedish author Tove Jansson, first published in 1984. It was relatively well received by critics, finding more acceptance than her earlier novels for adults.

== Plot ==
Jonas, a journalist who has just retired, goes into the countryside for the summer to be with his daughters, bringing some work with him. While trying to complete the biography of a disagreeable man named as Y, he finds himself writing about his own dysfunctional family: the words refuse to do what he wants. Eventually he buries the script in a stony field.

== Analysis ==
Jansson's biographer Boel Westin writes that Jansson's characteristically spare prose is here cut down to an extreme. Westin comments that the novel is "the most savage story about writing and speech among Tove's later books," the stony field being washed clean of earth as a well-written book has been washed clean of surplus words. She writes that the book had less difficulty than her earlier novels, with an audience "less Moomin-fixated". Instead, the book "clearly appealed to men" and was reviewed mainly by men. Magnus Ringbom called its writing "a finely honed narrative technique", praising its "psychological realism united with rich symbolism". The poet and translator Caj Lundgren, writing in Svenska Dagbladet, praised it as full of more wisdom than many longer books.

Tuula Karjalainen writes that the book "certainly caused Tove less trouble than The True Deceiver. She notes that the protagonist Jonas is in "despair about the difficulty of writing", having the feeling that he has "destroyed too many words in this job, all my words are worn out and overworked". She comments that all writers may to an extent share that feeling, and that Jansson certainly did as both of her recent books, Sun City and Art in Nature, had sold badly.

Claire Dickenson, in Swedish Book Review, describes the book as darkly humorous, short and readable.

== Translations ==
The novel has been translated into Finnish as Kivipelto by Oili Suominen; it was published by WSOY in 1989 along with Resa med lätt bagage as Kevyt kantamus ja muita kertomuksia.

== Sources ==
- Karjalainen, Tuula (2016) [2013]. Tove Jansson: Work and Love. Penguin Books. ISBN 978-0-141-97882-6.
- Westin, Boel (2014). Tove Jansson Life, Art, Words: The Authorised Biography. Translated by Mazzarella, Silvester. Sort of Books. ISBN 978-1-908745-45-3.
