= Tove Jansson's artistry =

Analysis of cartoons, illustrations, and paintings by Tove Jansson

Tove Jansson is known as a children's writer and illustrator of the Moomintroll books, but besides those drawings, her artwork included political cartoons, comic strips, murals and paintings. She considered her careers as author and painter to be of equal importance.

Her cartoons for the Swedish-language satirical magazine Garm mocked both Adolf Hitler and Joseph Stalin. They were drawn in pen-and-ink, often with areas of red as highlights. Her Moomin comic strips were warmly humorous, with technically skilful and innovative drawing. Her paintings included frescoes painted directly with dry-powder pigment onto newly-laid plaster, as with her works Country Celebration and City Celebration for Helsinki City Hall. Her Moomin books were mostly sharply illustrated in pure black-and-white using Rapidograph pens, in a switch from her first books where she had used grey washes. She took on some commissions to illustrate classic works such as Lewis Carroll's The Hunting of the Snark and Alice's Adventures in Wonderland, where her work brought the strangeness of the text to life. She also tried her hand at illustrating Tolkien, with a set of illustrations for the 1962 Swedish edition of J. R. R. Tolkien's 1937 children's book The Hobbit. She was however more interested in the landscapes than in Tolkien's characters, which she found commonplace.

== Political cartoons ==
Autumn 1938 Garm magazine cover "Mer Kaka!" ("More Cake!") lampooning Adolf Hitler as "self-important and comic", depicting his territorial ambitions with the world as a plum pudding and various territories (Note: The various slices and small cakes are labelled "Engelska kolonier", "Sönder Jylland", "Schweiz", "Belgien", "Hollandisk Kolonier", "Memel", "Elsass Lothringen", "Rumänien", "Danzig", "Polska Korridoren", and "Jugoslavien" (In English: English colonies, South Jutland, Switzerland, Belgium, Dutch Colonies, Klaipėda Region, Alsace-Lorraine, Romania, Gdansk, The Polish Corridor, Yugoslavia).) as slices of cake. Jansson worked with pen-and-ink, often highlighting her cover images with areas in another colour, such as red.

The author and artist Tove Jansson worked as an illustrator and political cartoonist for the Swedish-language satirical magazine Garm from 1929 to 1953, when the magazine ceased production. Among her many cartoons for Garm, in 1938 she drew Adolf Hitler crying, surrounded by European leaders, who try to calm him down by offering him slices of cake labelled with the names of territories he wanted to acquire. Her cover illustrations for the magazine lampooned both Hitler and Joseph Stalin: in one, Stalin draws his sword from his long scabbard, only to find it absurdly short; in another, multiple Hitlers ransack a house, carrying away food and artworks. In The Spectator's view, Jansson made both "Hitler and Stalin appear as preposterous little figures, self-important and comic".

In total, Jansson created around 100 covers for Garm and around 500 cartoons and other illustrations for the magazine. She worked with pen-and-ink, creating line drawings with small areas of solid black; she frequently added areas of another colour (such as red) for the cover images. The comics expert Paul Gravett writes that Jansson was exceptional in being "an outspoken female political cartoonist" in that period; a 1941 vote rated her as the most humorous cartoonist in the Nordic countries.

== Comic strips ==
Tove Jansson, after a while with her brother Lars, demonstrated their "technical skill" and "innovation" in the Moomin comic strips, as here in the 1958 Moomin and the Comet with "ingenious" use of the panel borders.

Jansson's earliest comic strips were created for productions including Lunkentus (Prickinas och Fabians äventyr, 1929), Vårbrodd (Fotbollen som Flög till Himlen', 1930), and Allas Krönika (Palle och Göran gå till sjöss, 1933).

The figure of the Moomintroll appeared first in Jansson's political cartoons, where it was used as a signature character near the artist's name. This prototype Moomin figure, then called Snork (in Swedish) or Niisku (in Finnish), was thin and ugly, with a long, narrow nose and devilish tail. Jansson designed the Moomins in her youth: after she lost a philosophical quarrel about Immanuel Kant with one of her brothers, she drew "the ugliest creature imaginable" on the wall of their outhouse. This Moomin later gained weight and a more pleasant appearance, but in the first Moomin book The Moomins and the Great Flood (originally Småtrollen och den stora översvämningen), the Immanuel-Kant-Moomin is still perceptible.

In 1952, after Comet in Moominland and Finn Family Moomintroll had been translated into English, a British newspaper man, Charles Sutton, asked if Tove Jansson would be interested in drawing comic strips about the Moomins. Jansson accepted the offer. The comic strip Moomintroll started in what was at the time the world's largest daily newspaper, the London Evening News. The strip spread to hundreds of other newspapers in 12 countries.

Laura Honkasalo, reporting on the first Moomin comic strip seminar (held in August 2000) in Kulttuurivihkot, noted that they use a warm humour, not laughing at anyone's expense, and that the humour relies on slow narrative. She notes Juhani Tolvanen's analysis that Lars Jansson's drawing is "technically skilful" and "innovative", such as with thematic panel boundaries. Moomin.com notes that the vertical boundaries between the comic strip panels are not always just lines: Tove and her brother Lars Jansson sometimes "delightful[ly]" enlivened the strips by making the boundaries scenic elements such as doors, ropes, curtains, or trees.

== Paintings ==
Jansson's 1941 painting of her friend Eva Konikoff has been described by Boel Westin as embodying both her determination as an artist and her friendship.

Jansson made paintings throughout her life. The National Biography of Finland describes Jansson as going "against the conventional image of an artist with her unusually even balance between visual art and writing." She exhibited during the 1930s and early 1940s, holding her first solo exhibition in 1943. Despite generally positive reviews, criticism induced Jansson to refine her style; her 1955 solo exhibition was simpler in detail and content. Between 1960 and 1970 she held five more solo exhibitions.

By the 1960s, her paintings had become more abstract; her biographer, Tuula Karjalainen, writes that Jansson often chose themes, such as the 1963 Storm and her 1968 Hurricane, that enabled "a perfectly naturalistic execution [to produce] an abstract impression in the finished work".

Jansson's 1941 painting of her friend Eva Konikoff was exhibited at Helsinki's "Young Artists" exhibition in 1942. The scholar of literature Boel Westin describes Konikoff as embodying "freedom, power, and will" to Jansson. Westin writes that the portrait of "a free woman" was of "great importance" to Jansson, as it embodied both her determination as an artist, and her friendship with Konikoff. In Westin's view, the fact that Eva is wearing only her slip increases the power of the work; she notes that Konikoff's family were disturbed by it. At the exhibition, the critics called it an "accomplished" study of a figure. Jansson had not tried to sell the work: she intentionally priced it high enough to prevent a sale, keeping the painting for herself; at a later date she changed her mind and gave it to Konikoff.

== Murals ==
Throughout her career, Jansson created a series of commissioned murals and public artworks, including:

- The canteen at the Strömberg factory at Pitäjänmäki, Helsinki (1945)
- A pair of frescos for the cellar restaurant of Helsinki City Hall (1947) (Note: Now relocated to the Swedish Workers' Institute, Helsinki, still on public display. A photo of the artist at work on the frescos is at Tove Jansson#Murals.)
- The Aurora Children's Hospital in Helsinki
- The Seurahuone hotel at Hamina, Kymenlaakso
- The Ten Virgins altarpiece in Teuva (Swedish: Östermark) Church (1954), South Ostrobothnia, her only church painting
- Fairy-tale murals in schools, including the kindergarten in Pori, Satakunta (1984)

The frescoes in Helsinki City Hall were painted with dry-powder pigment straight onto newly-spread plaster. Jansson was assisted in the technique on the first one, Country Celebration (Fest på landet), by the fresco restorer Niilo Suihko, but created the second fresco, City Celebration (Fest i stan), on her own.

Jansson's fresco City Celebration (Swedish: Fest i stan), depicts both Jansson (seated, left foreground) and her lover Vivica Bandler (dark-haired, dancing behind her)

The City fresco depicts several elegantly-dressed figures, including Jansson seated at a table with a fan, drink, vase of flowers, cigarette, and small Moomintroll. Philip Oltermann, in The Guardian, suggests that the Moomintroll is not so much a piece of branding as "a kind of spirit animal to the artist herself". Just behind Jansson, and clearly recognisable, is her lover Vivica Bandler, daughter of Helsinki's treasurer, Erik von Frenckell, dancing with a man in a tailcoat. Karjalainen comments that the work shows "a Paradise influenced by culture", and that it seems to depict Jansson's life. Karjalainen writes that the fresco was "a declaration of love", becoming a memory of that time, and "a picture of courage", as she was openly depicting a secret and then-illegal relationship.

== Illustrations ==
=== Moomin books ===
Having used grey washes in her first Moomin book, Jansson switched to pure pen-and-ink in the 1948 Trollkarlens hatt, creating a more dramatic effect, as in this illustration of a storm.

Jansson wrote and illustrated nine books about the exploits of the Moomins, as well as picture books for younger children. She became known principally as their author, despite her continuing work as an artist. In the illustrations of her first Moomin books, as in the 1946 first edition of Kometjakten, she used grey washes to implement shading.

For the 1948 Trollkarlens hatt (Finn Family Moomintroll), she switched to "a new technique", pure black-and-white, drawing with one thin and one thick Rapidograph pen. She redrew the illustrations for Kometjakten's 1951 English edition, Comet in Moominland, using only pen-and-ink. The result was a sharper and more dramatic effect.

Jansson adopted a fresh approach for her picture books, starting with the 1952 Hur gick det sen? Boken om Mymlan, Mumintrollet och Lilla My (The Book about Moomin, Mymble and Little My), bringing the Moomins to small children. She used a modern style of artwork, and experimented with colour and holes through each of the pages. Jansson designed the book to provide its young child readers with a series of surprises.

=== Illustrating Lewis Carroll ===
Contrasting approaches to Lewis Carroll's
The Hunting of the Snark

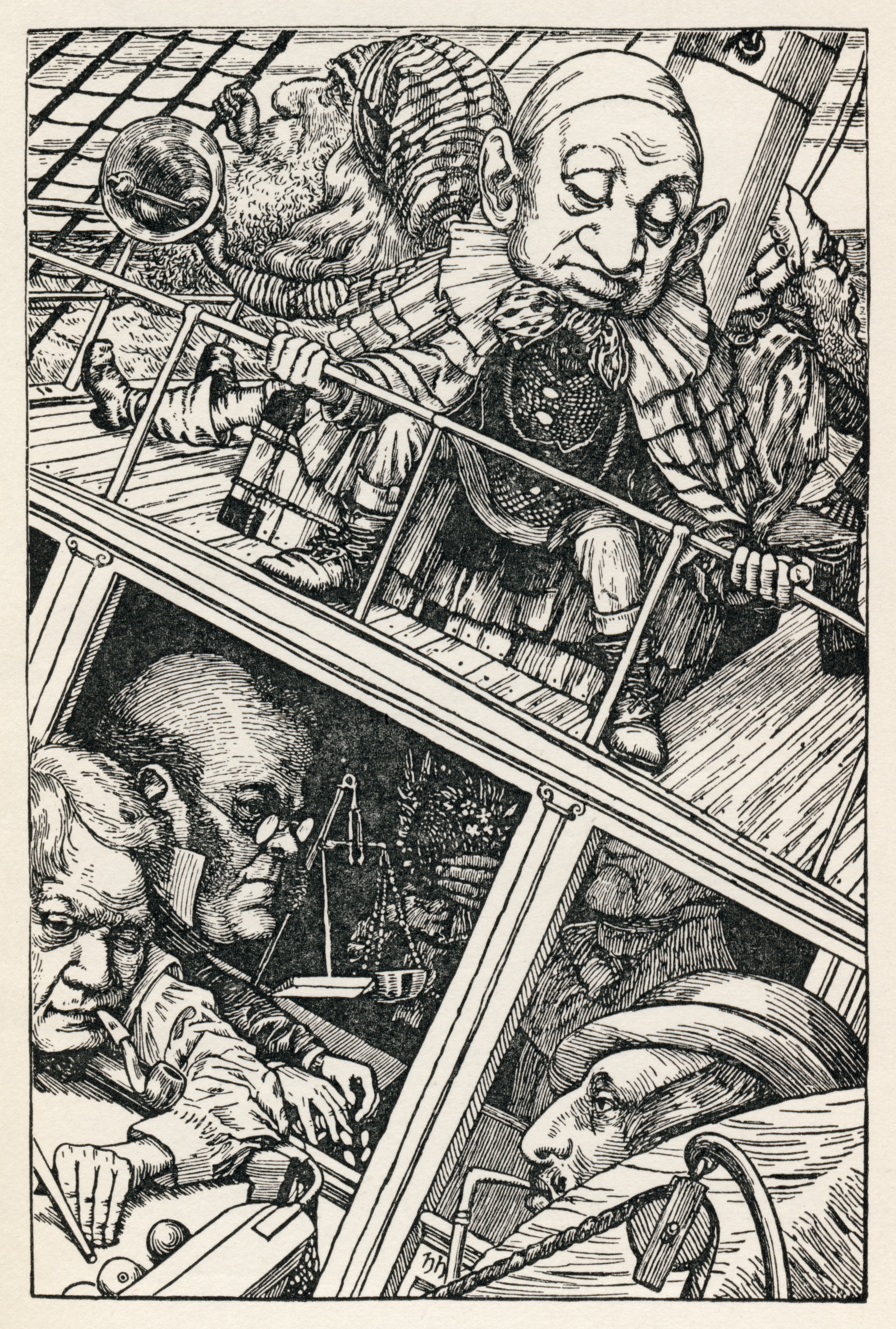
Henry Holiday's 1876 illustration "The Landing"

Jansson's radically different "moominesque" version

As well as illustrating her own books, Jansson illustrated Swedish translations of classics such as Lewis Carroll's The Hunting of the Snark and Alice's Adventures in Wonderland, at the invitation of Bonniers's Åke Runnquist; he became her publisher and they exchanged letters for many years.

Jansson had not seen Henry Holiday's original 1876 illustrations for The Hunting of the Snark, and in 1958 created a radically different approach to depicting Carroll's nonsense poem. The publishers described the finished illustrations as being of the "highest class". The British Library commented that "Jansson depicted a cast of large-eyed, long-snouted moominesque figures in contrast to Holiday's caricatured, large-headed humans, both bringing the absurd to life in their own ways."

In 1965, she illustrated Runnquist's version of Alice in Wonderland. She wrote to Runnquist that she saw it as "horror ... the story is terrifying and can in no way be seen as an idyll, but it causes shivers of pleasure." He asked her to tone down the horror, but in the British Library's opinion that element remains "in the uncanny, magnified or magnifying underworld", with Jansson's artwork conveying the story's "inherently uneasy and confounding fantasy."

=== Illustrating Tolkien ===
Jansson's illustration "The Bridge over Rivendell" for the 1962 Swedish edition of J. R. R. Tolkien's The Hobbit. She intentionally used a freer style than for her Moomin books, favoured "macabre" landscapes with "coal-black rivers, moonlit moors", and made the characters small.

Jansson created a set of illustrations for the 1962 Swedish edition of J. R. R. Tolkien's 1937 children's book The Hobbit, titled Bilbo: En hobbits äventyr, (Note: Another of her illustrations for The Hobbit can be seen in the Gollum article; she made the monster very large, before Tolkien stated that it was small.) at the request of the Swedish children's author Astrid Lindgren. Jansson was far more interested in Tolkien's landscapes than his characters, which she found commonplace, whereas, she said to her partner Tuulikki Pietilä, "the scenery is seductive in its macabre ferocity". She went on to say that she liked "coal-black rivers, moonlit moors with fiery wolves – a whole world of catastrophe" that she knew she could express in her illustrations. Jansson was concerned to avoid her Moomin style of what she described to Lindgren as "careful line-drawing and painstakingly filled surfaces", so she intentionally developed a freer style, while she kept the figures small, sometimes in her words "really small".

The scholar of literature Björn Sundmark states that Jansson's work helped to define how Tolkien's Middle-earth fantasy could be depicted visually. The edition with her illustrations was not reprinted for many years, (Note: It was eventually reprinted in 1994 in the same 24 cm format by Rabén Prisma, ISBN 978-9-15182-727-8.) even though reviewers and "Tolkienists" liked Jansson's "expressive" images. Sundmark suggests that the reason was that in the 1960s, a new, more realistic style became the norm for fantasy art.

== Legacy ==
In 2024, the Helsinki Art Museum held a retrospective exhibition, named "Paradise", of Jansson's public art work, in preparation for the 80th anniversary of her creation of the Moomins. It included five of her murals alongside full-scale sketches for them, and her competition paintings.

From November 2026 to May 2027, the Quentin Blake Centre for Illustration in London is holding an exhibition of Jansson's drawings, the first specifically on her illustrations.

== Sources ==
- Gravett, Paul (2022). Tove Jansson. The Illustrators. Thames & Hudson. ISBN 978-0-500-09433-4.
- Karjalainen, Tuula (2016) [2013]. Tove Jansson: Work and Love. Penguin Books. ISBN 978-0-141-97882-6.
- Tolvanen, Juhani (2000). Muumisisarukset. Tove ja Lars Jansson – Muumipeikko-sarjakuvan tarina [Moomin siblings: Tove and Lars Jansson – The Story of the Moomintroll Comic] (in Finnish). WSOY. ISBN 978-951-0-23633-8.
- Westin, Boel (2014). Tove Jansson Life, Art, Words: The Authorised Biography. Translated by Mazzarella, Silvester. Sort of Books. ISBN 978-1-908745-45-3.
