= Fair Play (novel) =

1989 novel by Tove Jansson

- First edition
- Author: Tove Jansson
- Original title: Rent spel
- Language: Swedish
- Genre: Autobiographical novel
- Publisher: Bonniers
- Publication date: 1989
- Publication place: Finland
- Preceded by: The Field of Stones

Fair Play (in the original Swedish Rent spel) is a novel by the Finland Swedish author Tove Jansson, first published in 1989. It portrays the romantic relationship between two artistic women.

Jansson's biographers and critics have seen the book as a depiction of Jansson's lesbian relationship with her lover Tuulikki Pietilä.

== Plot ==
The novel portrays the romantic relationship between two women doing artistic work, Jonna and Mari, who live in separate apartments in the same house. They are in many ways quite different, but maybe because of this they are able to complete each other. It is about give and take, compromises and communication, and how the relationship survives even if it changes when the people do.

== Analysis ==
The chapters are written as separate short stories, but sharing the same characters throughout the book. A few of the stories have been republished in the short story collection A Winter Book.

Jansson's biographer Boel Westin writes that Jansson "ruthlessly" describes how Mari edits her short stories as experienced by her partner Jonna. Westin comments that the novel serves as "a cruel self-portrait, frank and detached at the same time, a painful but vital process", and that it portrays "the life Tove and Tooti [Tuulikki Pietilä] shared in studios, on the island, at work and travelling with the Konica [camera], a life the story makes little attempt to disguise. She adds that all this makes the novel remarkable since the subject was "a definite reality" for Jansson and her partner Tuulikki. She identifies "the writer Mari [who] searches for new words to tell stories with" as one of multiple "Tove" characters across Jansson's works.

Parallels identified by Boel Westin between the novel and Jansson's life
| Fair Play | Jansson's life |
|---|---|
| Jonna, graphic artist | Tuulikki Pietilä |
| Mari, short story writer | Tove Jansson |
| Family wall | Jansson's studio |
| Mari's mother started Girl Scouts in Sweden | Jansson's mother Signe Hammarsten-Jansson |
| View of Helsinki harbour | View from attic passage between Jansson's and Pietilä's flats |
| Themed TV evenings watching feature films | As Jansson and Pietilä did |

Tuula Karjalainen states directly that it is "about Tove and Tuulikki's life – or at least something very close" to it. She notes that the scholar Barbro Gustafsson proposed that the novel indicates a lesbian "femme/butch" relationship, with Jonna as the somewhat masculine Tuulikki to take the "butch" role. The critic Suvi Ahola in Finland's daily newspaper Helsingin Sanomat viewed the novel as plainly autobiographical.

Anna Carey, in The Irish Times, concurs that Fair Play serves as a record of Jansson's relationship with Pietilä, noting Jansson's description of it as "rather happy tales of two women who share a life of work, delight and consternation". Carey writes that it has the hallmarks of Jansson's writing, being "humane, witty and slightly wild".

== Translations ==
The English edition appeared in 2007 with a translation by Thomas Teal that won the Bernard Shaw Prize for Swedish Translation in 2009.

== Sources ==
- Karjalainen, Tuula (2016) [2013]. Tove Jansson: Work and Love. Penguin Books. ISBN 978-0-141-97882-6.
- Westin, Boel (2014). Tove Jansson Life, Art, Words: The Authorised Biography. Translated by Mazzarella, Silvester. Sort of Books. ISBN 978-1-908745-45-3.
