= Sun City (novel) =

1973 novel by Tove Jansson

- First edition
- Author: Tove Jansson
- Original title: 'Solstaden'
- Cover artist: Tove Jansson
- Language: Swedish
- Subject: Old age, death
- Genre: Literary Fiction
- Publisher: Schildts & Söderströms (Finland), Pantheon Books (US)
- Publication date: 1974
- Publication place: Finland
- English publication date: 1976
- ISBN: 978-9-51-500073-6
- Preceded by: The Summer Book
- Followed by: The True Deceiver

Sun City is a novel by the Finland Swedish artist and author Tove Jansson about old age and death. It was published in 1974 in Swedish by Schildts & Söderströms in Finland as Solstaden (with the same meaning). An English translation came out in the US in 1976. The book did not sell well; critics suggest that readers were not ready to accept such a drastic change of direction from Jansson, who was mainly known for her Moomin children's books.

== Plot ==
Sun City depicts a diverse group of old people in a home for the elderly in the US; it is set in St. Petersburg, a city in the American state of Florida. The elderly customers are cared for by the beautiful Linda. Her lover is Bounty Joe, so called because he guards a replica of the mutiny-ridden sailing ship, HMS Bounty; he holds to a modern faith that Jesus is going to return, just in time. Some of the residents are prepared to face death honestly; others are in denial.

== Analysis ==
The scholar of literature Boel Westin writes that a novel which explores "the end of life ... the decay of body and senses, about death as the only future, was in no way what people associated with the poet with the magical gift." The book was launched as a "Book of the Month" but failed to sell well; the initial hardback was not followed by a paperback edition. Westin suggests that readers were not willing to accept such a change in direction from Jansson, so "it never had any real chance of success." On the other hand, Westin notes, Jansson had written about old age both in her Moomin books, with the 1970 Moominvalley in November's elderly Grandpa-Grumble, and in her 1972 novel for adults, The Summer Book: but the account in Sun City is in her view starker and grimmer.

B. D. McClay, reviewing the book in The Washington Post, comments that the novel does what few novels do: it looks at old age. The review notes that care homes for the elderly in the US range from grim to costly but at least relatively dignified, but that all of them share "the forced proximity among people who might not otherwise have much to do with one another, and the way time is both regimented and aimless."

Lauren LeBlanc, reviewing Sun City for The Atlantic, writes that the 57-year-old Jansson used a holiday in the United States to turn her career in a wholly new direction. Famous as the author of the Moomin children's books, and not wishing to continue "coasting on her reputation", she decided to switch to writing for adults. Her mother had recently died, making her feel, in her own words, "a great sense of unreality". She saw for herself the reality of old people's homes in Florida, and decided to write about them.

Claire Dickenson, in the Swedish Book Review, calls Sun City "perhaps Jansson’s most unsettling book ... uncomfortable but compelling reading". She notes that Jansson returns to the dark side of ageing in her 1982 novel The True Deceiver. She picks out the theme of truth about ageing as central to the book, mentioning the collision of Katri, who is totally honest, and Anna, "who lives in a world of floral bunnies."

Jansson's biographer, Tuula Karjalainen, writes that Jansson and her partner Tuulikki Pietilä went on a world trip, meaning to visit Florida only briefly, but that Jansson became fascinated by finding that they were staying in "an old people's city, a kind of waiting room for death", and extended her stay. She was concerned about the novel's likely reception by "New Left intellectuals", and personally thanked the Swedish literary critic Lars Bäckström for his favourable review.

== Editions ==
An English translation by Thomas Teal was published in the US by Pantheon Books in 1976.

== Sources ==
- Jansson, Tove (1976) [1974]. Sun City. Pantheon Books. ISBN 978-0394499079.
- Karjalainen, Tuula (2016) [2013]. Tove Jansson: Work and Love. Penguin Books. ISBN 978-0-141-97882-6.
- Westin, Boel (2014) [2007]. Tove Jansson Life, Art, Words: The Authorised Biography. Translated by Mazzarella, Silvester. Sort of Books. ISBN 978-1-908745-45-3.
