= Notes from an Island =

Non-fiction book by Tove Jansson

Anteckningar från en ö
- First edition
- Author: Tove Jansson
- Illustrator: Tuulikki Pietilä
- Cover artist: Signe Hammarsten-Jansson
- Language: Swedish
- Genre: Autobiography
- Publication date: 1996
- Publication place: Finland
- English publication date: 2021

Notes from an Island is a non-fiction book by the Finland Swedish author and artist Tove Jansson, with illustrations by her partner Tuulikki Pietilä. It was first published by Bonniers in Finland, in Swedish, as Anteckningar från en ö (with the same meaning) in 1996. It contains pieces written by Jansson, by her mother, and by their friend Sven Brunström. It describes Jansson's life in her summer home of the island of Klovharun, and their farewell to the island.

== Contents ==
The book contains pieces written by Jansson, by her mother Signe Hammarsten-Jansson, and by their friend Sven Brunström. It describes Jansson's life in her summer home of the island of Klovharun, as Brunström drily records bringing materials and building the cabin, and as Jansson narrates how they go fishing, sail, and interact with the world. A piece covers their decision to stop coming to the island as they get old.

In the English paperback's essay "The Island", Jansson discusses people's dream of living on their own island.

The book is illustrated with 24 "atmospheric" watercolours and copper plate etchings by Jansson's life partner Tuulikki Pietilä. The cover map is by Jansson's mother.

== Analysis ==
Claire Dickenson comments in the Swedish Book Review that Jansson is as brave as ever, covering the more painful aspects like giving up the island as well as her activities during her time there.

Pär Jonasson, reviewing the book for QX, notes that Jansson and her life partner spent their summers on their little island, "a cold and windswept skerry", helping to inspire the Moomin books.

Eva Kuhlefelt writes in Finland's Ny Tid that the book is her favourite among Jansson's writings, "not least the magnificent closing scene in which the elderly couple bid farewell to their past by allowing a dragon to fly freely away across the sky and sea."

Boel Westin notes in her biography that Jansson wrote that "existence on an isolated skerry involves a sort of intensification of what you are, what you feel and what you do." Accordingly, she writes, leaving the island of Klovharun meant that "she left a lifelong passion behind her. The world grew smaller and the space she had available to live and work in shrank." The book was "a declaration of love to the savage island in words, showing how she had captured it, tried to tame it, lived with it and finally been forced to leave it."

Tuula Karjalainen writes that eventually "old age can no longer be ignored", quoting Jansson: "There came a summer when it was suddenly an effort to pull up the nets. The terrain became unmanageable and treacherous. This made us more surprised than alarmed... And that last summer something unforgivable happened: I became afraid of the sea." Karjalainen states that they chose to leave "with dignity", but that all the same "the departure felt like a little death." From the experience came "the wonderful book". She notes the "prodigious farewell" to Klovharun, quoting Jansson: "So I would never fish again. Never again throw the slops into the sea and be careful with rainwater, never again suffer agonies over Victoria [their boat], and now no one, no one, had any need to be concerned about us! Good."

== Translations ==
The English translation by Thomas Teal was published by Sort of Books in 2021; their 2024 paperback edition included Jansson's 1961 essay "The Island".

== Sources ==
- Karjalainen, Tuula (2016) [2013]. Tove Jansson: Work and Love. Penguin Books. ISBN 978-0-141-97882-6.
- Westin, Boel (2014). Tove Jansson Life, Art, Words: The Authorised Biography. Translated by Mazzarella, Silvester. Sort of Books. ISBN 978-1-908745-45-3.

== See also ==
- Letters from Tove
