= Travelling Light (short story collection) =

Short story collection by Tove Jansson

Resa med lätt bagage
- First edition
- Author: Tove Jansson
- Language: Swedish
- Genre: Short stories
- Publisher: Bonniers
- Publication date: 1987
- Publication place: Finland
- English publication date: 2010
- Preceded by: Art in Nature
- Followed by: Letters from Klara

Travelling Light is a collection of short stories by the Finland Swedish author and artist Tove Jansson. It was first published by Bonniers in Finland in the Swedish language as Resa med lätt bagage (with the same meaning) in 1987. The Australian Broadcasting Corporation described the stories as an "unflinching" take on daily life, creating an "unnervingly vivid" result.

== Contents ==
The book is dedicated to "Tooti", Jansson's lover Tuulikki Pietilä. It contains 11 stories, and a section called "Correspondence" with letters to Jansson from a Japanese girl, Tamiko Atsumi. The title story concerns a man who goes on a voyage, trying very hard to be unconcerned and to take as little baggage as possible.

Story title	Story summary
An Eightieth Birthday	The Finnish speaker Jonne goes to an 80th birthday party in his fiancee's Swedish-speaking family; the present he has brought is a picture of San Gimignano that he found in a junkshop.
The Summer Child	The anxious Elis, although he is from a wealthy family, is sent away to a family in the country for the summer.
A Foreign City	A grandfather loses his hat, and the address of the hotel he is meant to be staying in. He gets lost in the foreign city.
The Woman Who Borrowed Memories	A woman decides to reinvent herself. She puts on the character of one of her friends, only to find that she seems to have taken over the woman's past.
Travelling Light	An anxious traveller finally takes ship, carrying as little as he thinks possible.
The Garden of Eden	A spinster professor goes to Spain to visit her god-daughter, who however has to leave in a hurry as her mother is sick. The professor has time to settle in to the expatriate community, who she despises.
Shopping	Kristian and Emily live in a ruined city after a nuclear war. Eventually they dare to go outside.
The Jungle	Two little boys pretend to be Tarzan and his son in a summer house in Finland. The wild beasts get more and more alarming.
The PE Teacher's Death	A PE teacher commits suicide. Henri and Flo go to dinner with Henri's business partner. Flo gets very drunk, talking about how the PE teacher had been opposing their business project to build some houses in the woods.
The Gulls	Arne finds teaching too much and he resigns. His wife takes him to a quiet island to recover, but the seagulls aggressively defend their nests. Arne gets back to the cottage bleeding and terrified.
The Hothouse	Uncle becomes interested in botany in his old age, and travels to the Botanic Garden. He takes ownership of a bench by the lily pond in the hothouse, and meets Josephson.
Correspondence	A serious Japanese girl writes repeatedly to Tove Jansson, growing in understanding.

The English edition, translated by Silvester Mazzarella and published in 2010 by Sort of Books, has an introduction by the novelist Ali Smith.

== Analysis ==
Jansson's biographer Tuula Karjalainen describes the title story "Travelling Light" as being "about the joys of travel, even when nothing seems to go as planned." She writes that the most "intoxicating" thing is the moment of departure, as the traveller says "Believe me, you cannot imagine my giddy sense of liberation."

Anna Hedigan, reviewing the book for the Australian Broadcasting Corporation, comments that the stories are about "ordinary, often ineffectual people". She calls the introduction by the short story writer Ali Smith "affectionate". Hedigan felt an "outstanding sensation ... of being creeped out" by the stories, with "queer children and psychic vampires ... a housewife who switches from supermarket to 'shopping' post-apocalypse, scavenging with bloodless practicality in the rubble of her destroyed empty town." The stories are in her view unflinching as Jansson observes the absurdities of daily life, remaining light and open whatever she describes. The result, she writes, is unnervingly vivid.

Lukas Lundin, for Arbetarbladet, writes that "these are stories of freedom but also captivity", which he describes as often interwined. He adds that the settings are claustrophobic, in places where the protagonists cannot escape, like a cabin in a ship, a greenhouse, a summerhouse, or an expatriate community.

Svenska Dagbladet comments that her stories demonstrate that Jansson had much more to offer than the Moomin books, with her "terrifyingly precise short story skill".

"The PE Teacher's Death" began life as a radio play, which Jansson commented was a naive piece. "Correspondence" and "Travelling Light" have been republished in the 1998 short story collection Meddelande, translated into English as "A Winter Book".

== Sources ==
- Karjalainen, Tuula (2016) [2013]. Tove Jansson: Work and Love. Penguin Books. ISBN 978-0-141-97882-6.
- Westin, Boel (2014). Tove Jansson Life, Art, Words: The Authorised Biography. Translated by Mazzarella, Silvester. Sort of Books. ISBN 978-1-908745-45-3.
