= Sara and Pelle and Neptune's Children =

Picture book by Tove Jansson

- 1st edition
- Author: Tove Jansson, writing as 'Vera Haij'
- Original title: Sara och Pelle och neckens bläckfiskar
- Language: Swedish
- Genre: Picture Book
- Set in: The Nixie's Underwater Land
- Publisher: Bildkonst
- Publication date: 1933
- Publication place: Finland
- Followed by: The Book about Moomin, Mymble and Little My

At age 14 (in 1928), Tove Jansson wrote and illustrated Sara and Pelle and Neptune's Children, her first picture book, under the Swedish title Sara och Pelle och näckens bläckfiskar. It was eventually published in 1933, using the pseudonym Vera Haij.

== Synopsis ==
Sara and Pelle and Neptune's Children is a 20-page illustrated book. It tells of a sister and brother, Sara and Pelle, who find themselves in the nixie's "underwater land". It is full of octopuses. The children are allowed to look after the smallest octopuses. When they go home again, the octopus larvae end up in their mother's cooking-pots for the family's dinner.

== Analysis ==
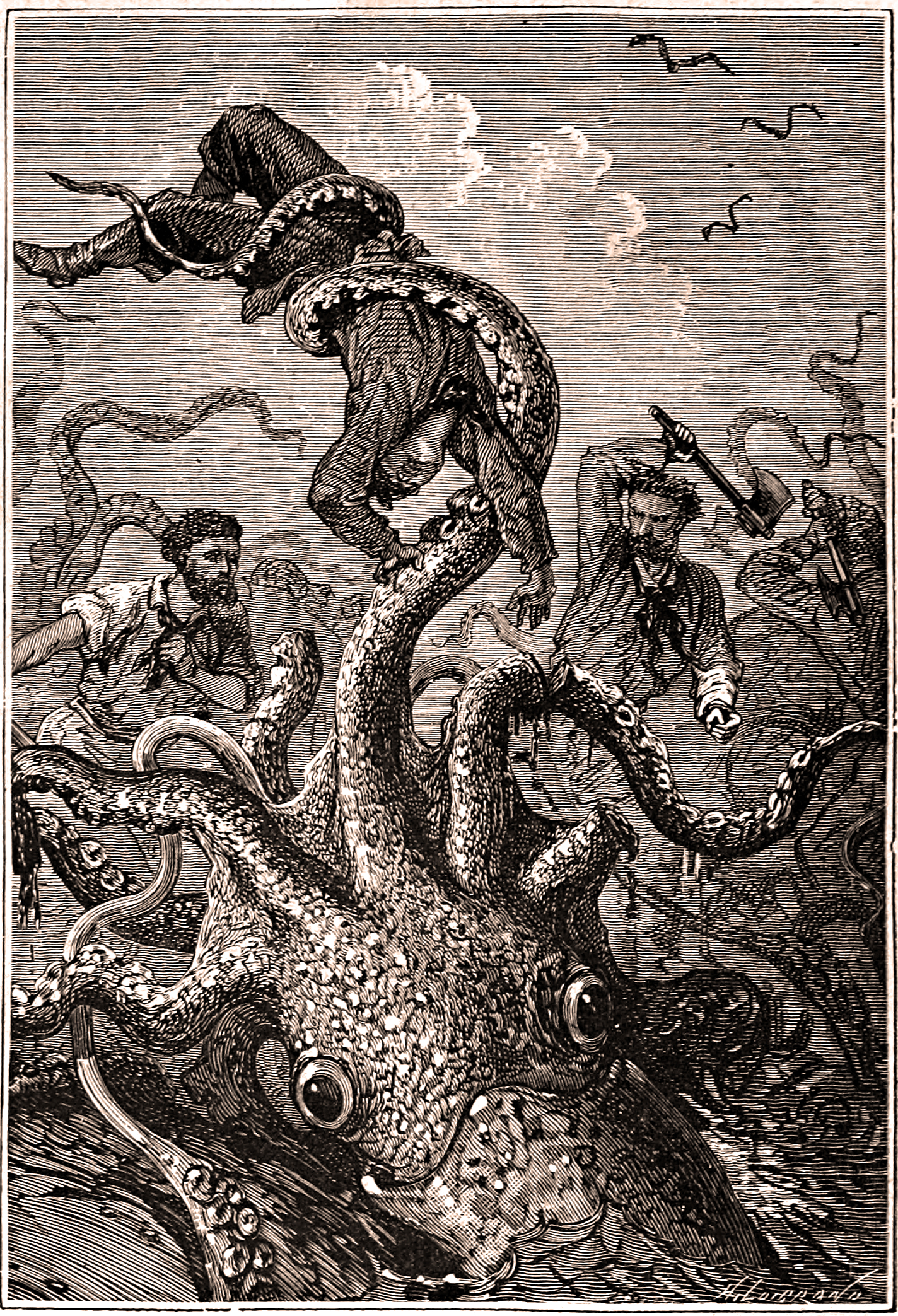
Jansson dreamt of octopuses after reading Jules Verne. Illustration from 20,000 Leagues Under the Sea by Alphonse de Neuville and Édouard Riou

At age 14, Tove Jansson wrote and illustrated Sara and Pelle and Neptune's Children, her first picture book, under the Swedish title Sara och Pelle och näckens bläckfiskar (literally Sara and Pelle and the Nixie's Octopuses (Note: The Swedish word bläckfisk means inkfish, and can refer to any ink-producing cephalopod, such as an octopus, cuttlefish, or squid.)).

The book was accepted by the Tilgmann Printing Press in May 1928, and the excited Jansson was promised 300 Finnish Marks as royalties. However the book's appearance was delayed and then shelved. It was eventually published in 1933, under the pseudonym Vera Haij. (Note: This was the name of one of Jansson's friends at Stockholm's Technical School.) Her biographer Boel Westin notes that the excitement had disappeared, indeed that she was "almost ... disgust[ed]" by the book. Westin writes that the "childish adventures" no longer had any meaning for an ambitious young artist, and suggests that this may have been the reason for publishing it under a pseudonym.

The book was translated into Finnish by the scholar of children's literature Sirke Happonen as Seikkailu merenpohjassa ("Adventure on the Seabed") and published by WSOY in 2014. Happonen commented that she did not try to translate literally, but aimed "to retain Jansson's playfulness". She stated that Tove's brother, Per Olov Jansson, had told her that after the two of them had read Jules Verne, they had both dreamt of octopuses.

== Sources ==
- Karjalainen, Tuula (2016) [2013]. Tove Jansson: Work and Love. Penguin Books. ISBN 978-0-141-97882-6.
- Westin, Boel (2014). Tove Jansson Life, Art, Words: The Authorised Biography. Translated by Mazzarella, Silvester. Sort of Books. ISBN 978-1-908745-45-3.
