= The Book About Moomin, Mymble and Little My =

1952 children's picture book by Tove Jansson

- First Swedish edition
- Author: Tove Jansson
- Original title: Hur gick det sen? Boken om Mymlan, Mumintrollet och Lilla My
- Translator: Silvester Mazzarella, Sophie Hannah
- Illustrator: Tove Jansson
- Cover artist: Tove Jansson
- Language: Swedish
- Series: Moomins
- Genre: Picture book
- Publisher: Schildts
- Publication date: 1952
- Publication place: Finland
- Pages: 28
- ISBN: 1-883211-10-7 (English) 978-2-7234-6766-7 (French)
- OCLC: 40510615
- Dewey Decimal: [E] 21
- LC Class: PZ8.3.J265 Mo 1996
- Preceded by: Sara and Pelle and Neptune's Children
- Followed by: Who Will Comfort Toffle?

The Book About Moomin, Mymble and Little My (Swedish: Hur gick det sen? Boken om Mymlan, Mumintrollet och Lilla My, lit. "What happened next? The book about Mymble, Moomintroll, and Little My") was the first Moomin picture book by the Finland Swedish author Tove Jansson, published in 1952 in Swedish by Schildts.

The picture book was innovative in its modern style of artwork, its use of colour, and the holes through each of the pages. Jansson designed it to provide its young child readers with a series of surprises. It won both Sweden's Nils Holgersson Plaque and Finland's Rudolf Koivu Prize in 1953.

== Plot ==
Moomintroll is taking milk back home to his mother, Moominmamma, when he meets The Mymble who is searching for her missing sister Little My. Together the pair go looking for her.

== Analysis ==
The picture book is fully illustrated with all text written in rhyming verse in a box in the corner of each page. Each spread in the book features cut-out holes, having the reader catch a glimpse of the next pages and anticipate 'what happened next' (Hur gick det sen? in the original Swedish).

The themes in the book resemble some of those of the Moomin novels, including vanishing, the forces of nature, the steady love of Moominmamma, and seeking and finding. The scholar of literature Boel Westin writes that with its adventures and "dramatic landscapes", it is "a psychological thriller about being tied to one's mother's apron strings and suffering separation anxiety, with Freudian overtones." In her view, the images "expressively depict childhood nightmares", with the "dreamlike colour combinations" reflect the fear of being abandoned by one's mother: not one of the images, she writes, is "a calming green place".

The book, first published in Swedish, at once became popular and to the Finland-Swedish Tove Jansson's pleasure was translated into languages including Finnish. For Finnish speakers (as opposed to Finland-Swedish speakers) it was in the words of Jansson's biographer Tuula Karjalainen their first contact with the world of the Moomins.

Westin writes that the picture book was "a speaking theatre of pictures", combining old and new ideas of both art and literature. Given that Jansson was both an artist and an author, it was a perfect fit for her skills. Jansson wrote that every page had a hole, "representing a door or the entrance to a cave or tiled stove... The characters crawl through and are met on the next page by the most surprising things. I think the moment of astonishment is vital when you are trying to capture the interest of small children."

Jansson made the book in the summer of 1951 on the small island of Bredskär in the Pellinki archipelago, experimenting with half-a-dozen small models of the book and making detailed notes on how it could be coloured, and how it would have to be bound so that the images and holes would all work together. She proposed to her publishers that it would have to "be printed on two eight-page sheets. The colour distribution has been calculated to give each sheet its own combination of colours, with the same for the covers." She explained that "I have tried to arrange it so that each page as it were 'borrows' colours through the holes from the preceding and succeeding pages." Westin comments that this was the voice of an artist accustomed to making decisions, treating the little picture book like an artist's canvas.

== Awards ==
Tove Jansson received Sweden's Nils Holgersson Plaque for Moomin and Little My in 1953, which was awarded for the fourth time that year. It was Jansson's first literary award, soon followed by Finland's Rudolf Koivu Prize. Karjalainen comments that the awards were well-earned, since the picture book brought high-quality modern artwork to the world of children's literature. In her speech on receiving the Nils Holgersson Plaque, Jansson said that children usually "live in a world in which the fantastic and the matter-of-fact have equal value"; her biographer Boel Westin comments that this belief was what "gives the Moomin books their strength". Westin notes that the award of the Plaque followed a dismissive article in the Swedish Library Association's newsletter, in contrast to the admiring citation for the award.

== Adaptations ==
In May 2011, the Finnish post company Itella published a stamp booklet featuring six characters from the book: Moomintroll, Mymble, Little My, Moominmamma, the Hemulen, and the Hattifatteners. The booklet contains six different 2nd class stamps, the design language of which follows the die-cut peek holes in the original book. The booklet was designed by Satu Lusa; 500,000 booklets were printed.

== Sources ==
- Karjalainen, Tuula (2016) [2013]. Tove Jansson: Work and Love. Penguin Books. ISBN 978-0-141-97882-6.
- Westin, Boel (2014) [2007]. Tove Jansson Life, Art, Words: The Authorised Biography. Translated by Mazzarella, Silvester. Sort of Books. ISBN 978-1-908745-45-3.
