= Art in Nature =

Short story collection by Tove Jansson

Dockskåpet och andra berättelser
- First edition
- Author: Tove Jansson
- Language: Swedish
- Genre: Short stories
- Publisher: Schildts
- Publication date: 1978
- Publication place: Finland
- Preceded by: The Listener
- Followed by: Travelling Light

Art in Nature is a collection of short stories by the Finland Swedish author and artist Tove Jansson. It was first published in Finland, in Swedish, as Dockskåpet och andra berättelser ("The Doll's House and Other Stories") in 1978. The book received mixed reviews, with some critics finding the stories cruel, clichéd, or gloomy, but the scholar Merete Mazzarella thought it Jansson's best book for adults.

== Contents ==
The book is a collection of short stories for adults. Several of them deal with the points of view of artists and craftspeople; some deal with homosexual relationships.

- Art in Nature (Konst i naturen): an elderly janitor meets a quarrelsome couple.
- The Monkey (Apan): a story about a bitter sculptor.
- The Cartoonist (Serietecknaren): a person takes over the job of making up stories after the cartoonist has a breakdown.
- White Lady (this English title is used in the original): three older women decide to go to a restaurant.
- The Doll's House (Dockskåpet): three men build a Moominhouse.
- A Sense of Time (Tidsbegrepp): a man, his grandmother, and a journey to Alaska.
- A Leading Role (Huvudrollen): an actor preparing for a part in her own way.
- The Locomotive (Lokomotiv): a train buff who has never spoken to women meets a terrifying woman one day.
- Flower Child (Blomsterbarnet): a woman who has never grown up.
- A Memory from the New World (Ett minne från det nya landet): three sisters who have settled in the US but aren't on speaking terms with each other.
- The Great Journey (Den stora resan): two women, one of whom tries to free herself from her mother.

The original Swedish edition also included En berättelse från Hilo, Hawaii ("A story from Hilo, Hawaii"), about a meeting between a bar owner and a rucksack-wearing tourist.

The English edition was translated by Thomas Teal and published in 2012 by Sort of Books.

== Analysis ==
The original title story, "The Doll's House", derived from the building of a model Moominhouse by Pentti Eistola (to whom the book is dedicated), Jansson, and Tuulikki Pietilä between 1958 and 1980. Several of the stories are similarly based on Jansson's life, though with what her biographer Tuula Karjalainen calls "changes and twists in reality of a kind that only an independent artist could have achieved." "The Great Journey", she suggests, is clearly about Jansson and Pietilä's relationship. "The Monkey" tells of a sculptor who may have been based on Viktor Jansson, while the childless writer in "White Lady" is distinctly like Jansson herself.

Jansson took care not to place stories with similar themes next to each other in the table of contents. In a letter, she stated that "The Great Journey" and "The Doll's House" were both about homosexual relationships, so had to be spaced apart. Or again, "A Leading Role" and "The Locomotive" were about people being exploited, and must not be placed together. (Note: The stories were rearranged in the English edition.) Jansson admired the New Zealand short story writer Katherine Mansfield, and the collection's Swedish title, meaning "The Doll's House" (the title of one of Mansfield's story collections), was an homage to her. In the view of Jansson's biographer Boel Westin, the title indicates Jansson's desire to create a "permanent, sheltered and well-defined world, a structural pattern typical of [her] writing."

Reviews were mixed; some found the stories cruel, clichéd, or gloomy. Folktidningen Ny Tid regretted that the book was "an awfully long way from Moominvalley". The Finnish scholar and author Merete Mazzarella however thought it Jansson's best book for adults.

== Editions ==
The collection was published in 1978 in Swedish by Finland's Schildts and Sweden's Bonnier. It was translated into Norwegian that same year as Dukkehuset og andre fortellinger. It came out in Finnish in 1980 as Nukkekaappi ja muita kertomuksia, and in German as Die Puppenstube: Erzählungen in 1981. Four different Russian editions have been published: Chestnyj obman: povesti i rasskazy in 1987, Vibrane in 2004, Putesjestvie nalegke: novelly in 2007, and Igrusjetshny juj dom: novelly in 2013.

== Sources ==
- Karjalainen, Tuula (2016) [2013]. Tove Jansson: Work and Love. Penguin Books. ISBN 978-0-141-97882-6.
- Westin, Boel (2014). Tove Jansson Life, Art, Words: The Authorised Biography. Translated by Mazzarella, Silvester. Sort of Books. ISBN 978-1-908745-45-3.
