= Letters from Klara =

Short story collection by Tove Jansson

Brev från Klara och andra berättelser
- First edition
- Author: Tove Jansson
- Language: Swedish
- Genre: Short stories
- Publisher: Bonniers
- Publication date: 1991
- Publication place: Finland
- Preceded by: Travelling Light
- Followed by: A Winter Book

Letters from Klara and Other Stories is a collection of short stories by the Finland Swedish author and artist Tove Jansson. It was first published by Bonniers in Finland, in Swedish, as Brev från Klara och andra berättelser (with the same meaning) in 1991. Critics have enjoyed the stories and noted their basis in Jansson's life.

== Contents ==
The book contains some ordinary short stories, some stories constructed as correspondences by letter, and some arranged as extracts from people's diaries. The stories are

- Letters from Klara (Brev från Klara)
- Robert (Robert)
- In August (I augusti)
- The Lily Pond (Näckroskärret)
- The Train Trip (Tågresan)
- Party Games (Sällskapslek)
- Pirate Rum (Sjörövarrom)
- About Summer (Om sommaren)
- The Pictures (Bilderna)
- Premonitions (Om förvarningar)
- Emmelina (Emmelina)
- My Friend Karin (Karin, min vän)
- A Trip to the Riviera (Resa till Rivieran)

The English edition, translated by Thomas Teal, was published by Sort of Books in 2017.

== Analysis ==
Tuula Karjalainen, in her biography of Tove Jansson, writes that the stories are based on Jansson's experiences, sometimes decades earlier, "yet the stories are fresh and read almost as if the events in them had only just happened." She suggests that the stories' authenticity comes from Jansson's use of her letters and notebooks, which recorded both events and personal feelings. In Karjalainen's view, the title story "Letters from Klara" is the most amusing, while "A Trip to the Riviera" broadly matches a trip made by Jansson and her mother Signe Hammarsten-Jansson to Juan-les-Pins and Barcelona when her mother had retired; she notes that the trip also served as the basis for the Moomin comic strip "Moomins on the Riviera".

Courtney Gillette, in Lambda Literary Review, comments that letter writing is one of Jansson's themes (in stories collected into different books, and whether or not the letters are real), including in the title story. Gillette comments that the correspondence reveals "a spunky character".

The scholar of literature Boel Westin writes that the first-person narrator in "My Friend Karin" is an artist who creates a painting of the "wise and foolish virgins" for her uncle, who is dissatisfied with the artist's faltering Christianity – which reveals itself in the work, but says "But we'll hang it up anyway". In reality, Westin notes, the virgins were the theme of Jansson's only religious painting, for the church in Teuva (Östermark) in Finland.

The Financial Times described the collection as a set of "clear and understated stories" by the Moomins author.

== Sources ==
- Karjalainen, Tuula (2016) [2013]. Tove Jansson: Work and Love. Translated by David McDuff. Penguin Books. ISBN 978-0-141-97882-6.
- Westin, Boel (2014). Tove Jansson Life, Art, Words: The Authorised Biography. Translated by Mazzarella, Silvester. Sort of Books. ISBN 978-1-908745-45-3.
