= The True Deceiver =

1982 novel by Tove Jansson

- First edition
- Author: Tove Jansson
- Original title: Den ärliga bedragaren
- Translator: Thomas Teal
- Cover artist: Tove Jansson
- Language: Swedish
- Subject: Truth and deception
- Genre: Literary Fiction
- Publisher: Schildts, Sort of Books
- Publication date: 1982
- Publication place: Finland
- English publication date: 2009
- Pages: 208
- ISBN: 978-1-59017-329-9
- Preceded by: Sun City
- Followed by: The Field of Stones

The True Deceiver (1982; Swedish: Den ärliga bedragaren, lit. "The Honest Deceiver") is a novel by Swedish-speaking Finnish author Tove Jansson. It was translated into English by Thomas Teal and won the Best Translated Book Award in 2011. The book imagines a power struggle between two women; Jansson's biographer Tuula Karjalainen sees both of them as self-portraits of the author.

The novel was first published in 1982 by Schildts, Finland. The English translation was first published in the UK by Sort of Books, then in the US through NYRB Classics, an imprint of The New York Review of Books.

== Plot ==
Katri Kling and Anna Aemelin seem to be very different women, one an outsider with a sharp mind and a dislike for social niceties, the other a polite creator of children's books. The two get into a serious power struggle.

== Analysis ==
In her introduction, Ali Smith describes the book as "a novel about truth, deception, self-deception and the honest uses of fiction ... almost deadpan in its clarity and seeming simplicity."

Jansson wrote to her friend Maya Vanni (to whom the book is dedicated) in 1980 that she had been "struggling on stubbornly and laboriously for a couple of years with a novel that has been getting me down". Her biographer Boel Westin described it as "a black novel, much fiercer than the stories in [Jansson's 1978 story collection] The Doll's House."

Jansson's biographer Tuula Karjalainen notes that the book caused the author a great deal of trouble, and that as Jansson wrote in a letter, she worked on it intermittently for at least 3 years. Karjalainen comments that "the similarities between Katri and Tove [Jansson] are obvious, especially if one is aware of the watchful efficiency with which Tove took care of business negotiations and money matters, and how competent ... she was at these tasks." Karjalainen then remarks that "the artist Anna, with her drawings for children, is perhaps even closer to Tove, a kind of self-deprecating caricature of her".

The novel explores, Westin writes, the power struggle between Anna Aemelin, children's book illustrator, and Katri Kling, seemingly very different but at root rather similar. As the story progresses, she remarks, first one and then the other seems to be 'the true deceiver'. In her view, the book may seem out of Jansson's usual scope, but its "merciless view of life" is "one of the characteristic features of her books for adults."

== Editions and adaptations ==
The book was translated into English by Thomas Teal and published in 2009 in the UK by Sort of Books with an introduction by the novelist Ali Smith. The translation is distributed in the US by New York Review Books.

Jansson worked on a film script for the book, and in the summer of 1985 filming began; the project was not completed.

== Sources ==
- Jansson, Tove (2009) [1982]. The True Deceiver. Sort of Books. ISBN 978-0-954-89957-8.
- Karjalainen, Tuula (2016) [2013]. Tove Jansson: Work and Love. Penguin Books. ISBN 978-0-141-97882-6.
- Westin, Boel (2014) [2007]. Tove Jansson Life, Art, Words: The Authorised Biography. Translated by Mazzarella, Silvester. Sort of Books. ISBN 978-1-908745-45-3.
