= The Listener (short story collection) =

Short story collection by Tove Jansson

Lyssnerskan
- First edition
- Author: Tove Jansson
- Language: Swedish
- Genre: Short stories
- Publisher: Schildts
- Publication date: 1971
- Publication place: Finland
- Preceded by: The Sculptor's Daughter
- Followed by: Art in Nature

The Listener is a collection of short stories by the Finland Swedish author and artist Tove Jansson. It was first published in Finland and Sweden, in Swedish, as Lyssnerskan in 1971.

The collection surprised many critics, who compared it either favourably or unfavourably to Jansson's Moomin books for children; some were admiring and grateful. Scholars have noted similarities of the characters and situations with Jansson's own life.

== Contents ==
The book is Tove Jansson's first collection of short stories for adults. It was dedicated to Jansson's brother Per Olov Jansson.

- The Listener (Lyssnerskan)
- Loose Sand (Lossa sand)
- Children's Party (Barnbjudning)
- The Sleeping Man (Den sovande mannen)
- Black-White (Svart-vitt)
- Letter to an Idol (Brev till en idol)
- A Love Story (En kärlekshistoria)
- The Other (Den andre)
- About Spring (Om våren)
- The Silent Room (Det tysta rummet)
- The Storm (Stormen)
- Grey Duchess (Grå Duchesse)
- Proposal for an Introduction (Förslag till en inledning)
- The Wolf (Vargen)
- The Rain (Regnet)
- Blasting (Sprängning)
- Lucio's Friends (Lucios vänner)
- The Squirrel (Ekorren)

== Analysis ==
Jane Housham in The Guardian wrote that the stories in the collection are, unlike the Moomin books, "fragmentary, starting and stopping in the middle of things, concerned more with situations than plots, and never going for clever twists or the flourish of a neat ending." She suggests that a common theme among them may be that they concern people who go from closed to partly open to closed again.

Tuula Karjalainen writes that all the stories link to Jansson's own life. For instance, "The Rain" tells of an old person's death, a year after the death of her mother; Karjalainen comments that the result is both definitely personal and a "universal narrative" about death and dying. Or again, she writes, "The Squirrel" tells of a woman's friendship with a squirrel on an island which is clearly Jansson's Klovharun. The seemingly surreal ending, with the squirrel sailing away was according to Jansson a real event, as it left on a floating plank.

Boel Westin writes that the collection showed Jansson in a new light after her Moomin books, concerned instead with "loneliness and obsession", and that some reviewers were predictably disappointed. Others were admiring and grateful, like Jacob Branting in Sweden's Aftonbladet. Some were literary; Göran Schildt in Svenska Dagbladet mentioned "artistically refined short stories", while other reviews drew comparisons with classic short story writers like Franz Kafka and Anton Chekhov. Schildt suggested that Jansson had had to step out of the "over-optimism" of Moominvalley, so that she could address "helplessness, loneliness, and insecurity". Westin identifies elements of Jansson's life that appear in the stories, from her mother's death in "The Rain", to the way an illustrator wrestles with her paper in "Black-White", to the dynamiting of rock on her island of Klovharun in "Blasting". Westin states that the remark she found most interesting in all the reviews she saw was that the "ability to understand and respect one's neighbour ... made [Jansson] into [in Schildt's words] 'something like the listener'" of the title story. Jansson herself wrote that the story she liked best in the collection was "The Squirrel"; Westin notes that its picture of "the woman struggling to write on her ... island" looks much like a self-portrait.

== Editions ==
The collection was published in Finland and Sweden in 1971, in Swedish, by Bonniers. An English translation by Thomas Teal was published by Sort of Books in 2014 in the UK.

== Sources ==
- Karjalainen, Tuula (2016) [2013]. Tove Jansson: Work and Love. Penguin Books. ISBN 978-0-141-97882-6.
- Westin, Boel (2014). Tove Jansson Life, Art, Words: The Authorised Biography. Translated by Mazzarella, Silvester. Sort of Books. ISBN 978-1-908745-45-3.
