= Eva Konikoff =

Eva Konikoff (1908-1999) was a Finnish photographer who emigrated to the United States. She is remembered, too, for her friendship and long correspondence with the artist and author Tove Jansson.

== Life ==
Eva Konikoff was born in Helsinki, Finland in 1908 into the Russian Jewish family of David Konikoff and Rosa, née Tsibuleffsky. They divorced in 1916. She worked for a while in Hemflit, an interior design and textile shop in Helsinki. She emigrated to the United States in June 1941, during the Second World War, arriving in Boston and going to live with her uncle in Philadelphia. In 1942 she moved to New York where she worked as a fashion shop's seamstress. While there, she began to take photography seriously, exhibiting her work at the 1947–48 "This is the Photo League" exhibition. Her subjects were street life near where she lived, especially children. In 1945 she married Ramon Cordova. In the 1960s he moved again, to Seattle. She died in Seattle in 1999.

Konikoff knew many of the same artists (Note: Including Eva Cederström, Ada Indursky, Tapio Tapiovaara, Sam Vanni, and Wolle Weiner.) as Tove Jansson did; Konikoff became Jansson's best friend. The two started to exchange letters in 1941; they continued to do so for many years afterwards. Jansson's half of their correspondence forms the largest chapter in the edited volume Letters from Tove; The Yale Review comments that Jansson admired Konikoff's "free, strong character", her honesty, and her independence of mind. All the same, Konikoff did not like Jansson's discussions of lesbianism. Their relationship was warm and sisterly but not sexual. Jansson painted a portrait of Konikoff in 1941, exhibiting it at the 1942 "Young Artists" exhibition in Helsinki. The portrait shows Konikoff sitting informally in a chair, dressed only in a slip; Jansson was concerned that her mother would be shocked at the painting, and priced the picture high enough to ensure it was not sold; she later gave it to Konikoff. Konikoff was impressed by the Surrealist paintings she saw in the US, but Jansson thought it a temporary fad.

== Legacy ==
A retrospective exhibition of Konikoff's photographs was held in Chicago in 2023.

== Sources ==
- James, Evan (1 June 2020). "Tove Jansson's Genius: The radical imagination that built the visionary world of the Moomins". The Yale Review (Summer 2020).
- Jansson, Tove (2020) [2014]. "Letters to Eva Konikoff 1941–1967". In Westin, Boel; Svensson, Helen (eds.). Letters from Tove. Translated by Death, Sarah. Sort of Books. pp. 97–254. ISBN 978-1908745842.
- Karjalainen, Tuula (2016) [2013]. Tove Jansson: Work and Love. Penguin Books. ISBN 978-0-141-97882-6.
- Westin, Boel (2014). Tove Jansson: Life, Art, Words. Sort of Books. ISBN 978-1-908745-45-3.
