= The Sculptor's Daughter =

1968 autobiographical novel by Tove Jansson

Bildhuggarens dotter
- First edition, with the figure of a little girl (right) in Viktor Jansson's studio
- Author: Tove Jansson
- Language: Swedish
- Genre: Autobiographical short stories
- Publisher: Schildts in Finland, Gebers in Sweden
- Publication date: 1968
- Publication place: Finland, Sweden
- English publication date: 1969
- Pages: 167
- ISBN: 978-9120015569
- Followed by: The Listener

The Sculptor's Daughter (Swedish: Bildhuggarens dotter) is an autobiographical collection of short stories written from a child's point of view by the Finland Swedish writer Tove Jansson, known for her Moomintroll books, and published in Swedish in 1968. It was her first book intended for adults. The book has been admired by critics, who note the enchanting nature of the stories, but also the darker side of the child's observations.

== Synopsis ==
The Sculptor's Daughter describes in fictionalised form Tove Jansson's childhood, both in the Finnish capital, Helsinki, and during summer holidays on an island. The stories are narrated from the child's point of view. Her father, the sculptor Viktor Jansson, is presented as a major influence.

| Story title | Story summary |
|---|---|
| The Golden Calf | A girl, daughter to a sculptor in a very religious family, decides to make a sculpture of an idolatrous golden calf. She takes pleasure in it, spoiled when her mother identifies it as a Lamb of God. |
| The Darkness | The girl sees the darkness as something with no face but long fingers that reach out and creep about. The sculptures slowly move about in the firelight. |
| The Stone | The girl finds a heavy stone which glints silver. She would be rich! She tries to roll it: it is very hard work. She manages to get it across a street, trying not to be noticed. She pushes it up to the fourth floor, but drops it and it rolls down the stair, making terrible echoing noises as it falls. |
| Party | Sometimes the girl is woken up by her father playing balalaika, with Cawan on guitar; later it can get wild and Marcus smashes his glass. Mother sets out the table beautifully. Anything can happen in a party. |
| Anna | Anna has thick dark eyebrows and sings as she washes the dishes; the girl tries to learn the words of the songs. Anna's lovers often feature as warriors in her songs. In the summer she smells different, of grass; she is very good at rowing. |
| The Iceberg | Summer came early one year. The family goes down to the sea and rows to an island, where the girl sees an iceberg for the first time. In the night she gets up and goes down to the shore where the iceberg has come to rest. She is too scared to jump across the watery gap onto it. She tries to push it away. The wind takes it, and it starts to move. |
| The Bays | There are five bays on the shore where nobody lives. Pappa gathers wild mushrooms to dry for the winter; it's a citizen's duty to provide for one's family. He does the same with fish. Once he left a mushroom basket on the shore and joined everyone for a swim; Rosa the pony ate all the mushrooms. |
| Sea Rules | "If the water rises, there will be a storm." And many other such sayings. Eventually, reports the girl, father just stops worrying and sails off. On board, you have to watch out for many things: if you get your foot caught in the mooring line you could be dragged overboard. Later Hermanson and father go out, returning soaking wet and happy: they drink a shot of brandy as soon as they're on dry land. |
| Albert | Albert is a year older than the girl. He baits the hooks with small living fish. She tells him off; he says they don't cry out, people always do it like this. Later they make a raft and paddle it out: it's safe as they have nearly learnt to swim. It gets foggy; they find an injured bird floating in the water. |
| High Water | It's a hot summer with no wind; mother sits and draws illustrations every day on the verandah, while father turns the boathouse into a sculptor's workshop. Twigs start to blow about; it blows more and more, and the water rises. The family rescue whatever they can that's floated out into the bay. The windows rattle: there's a wonderful storm. Mother pours coffee for everyone. |
| Jeremiah | A geologist stays a while on the island. He can't speak Swedish, rows a boat really badly, and forgets to moor it. The girl goes about with him every day, watching the boat or watching him wandering about and tapping with his geological hammer. His daughter arrives: she has a miniature geological hammer; the girl isn't allowed to go about with him any more, so she leaves little presents, like a bird's skeleton, on his doorstep. |
| Theatre | The old sauna hut has become rotten and been pulled down; only the oven and the doorway survive. Lighting the sauna oven was the only job that the old lady Fanny liked. She comes along and is confused, but lights the oven anyway. The girl dresses up as a princess and puts on a show for Fanny and the cat, but Fanny starts to shriek. |
| Pets and Women | Father loves animals as they don't complain, but women are another matter. The animals include Pellura the gull and Poppolino the monkey and some rabbits. Once a bat flies into him and goes to sleep inside his coat. Women are difficult, but mother doesn't count as a woman. |
| The Aunt Who Had an Idea | For weeks, the aunt cemented the stairs outside her cottage, but the job never got completed. Then she spent ages gluing small boxes and decorating them inside and out with glossy pictures, filling the attic with them. Then she commits the cardinal sin of disturbing father while he's making plaster casts, a job that cannot be interrupted as the plaster sets in a few seconds. |
| The Tulle Skirt | The girl turns the key of the wardrobe and waits: the door opens by itself as her mother's many-layered tulle skirt opens out as if alive. She creeps into the wardrobe and then out, with the skirt draped over her head like a rain-cloud, rustling like rain as she crawls about. A mass of animals are creeping about the house. |
| Snow | The family is stuck in a house, walled in by snow; it seems serious. The family respond in different ways. The girl is not happy when they are rescued. |
| Roseola | The girl gets roseola rash. She lies in bed all day but can't sleep. The pet monkey sees his tail and takes fright; her father turns a sculpture on its turntable and looks at it. The monkey jumps up onto a plaster bust and glares down at the sculptor. The bust falls down and smashes on the floor. Her father comforts the monkey and takes it out for a walk in the park. She thinks you never know what makes people or bacteria happy. |
| Flying | The girl dreams she is flying. She decides to dream about flying some more, and gradually gets better at it. The people start to notice and stare, and then come running after her. Then people manage to get airborne by stamping their feet, or by running for a tram. Her parents start to fly; then everyone, even the president. |
| Christmas | The girl describes Christmas in a sculptor's studio, with its traditions, decorations, sounds, lights, and how the family behaves. |

== Reception ==
=== In Scandinavia ===
According to Sveriges Radio, Jansson's book has become one of the classic depictions of childhood in Swedish-language literature. Sveriges Radio stated that the tension between security and terror is continuously present, and the work's fantasy is unbounded. It notes that Jansson wrote the book when she was 50, succeeding brilliantly, in the review's opinion, in going back in time to become the young Tove.

The Finnish art historian and Jansson's biographer Tuula Karjalainen writes that in the book, Jansson defines herself in relation to her father; the stories were based on real events, though with some embroidering and with some dates changed. Thus, she writes, "Snow" is largely a true story, but the experience of being in a house walled in by snow took place when Jansson was an adult. In Karjalainen's view, Jansson manages to combine the Moomin books' lightness of touch with a playful irony, but that she injects darker notes – such as where the little girl thinks about a society in which you have to be a man to hold a party, where people drink too much and get aggressive.

The Swedish scholar of children's literature Boel Westin notes in her biography of Jansson that she wrote the first of the stories, "Christmas", in 1965, publishing it in Vi magazine. She writes that Jansson uses the book to provide "her own story of childhood", given that she had already made much of it public through interviews and lectures. Westin describes Jansson's response to her question about gender roles; Jansson replied referring to the book's account, that her father was a sculptor, her mother an illustrator, and both worked: "Work was sacred. They would criticise each other's work." In Westin's view, the book, and with it the start of her writing for adults, was "no sudden impulse, but the fruit of a long maturing of thought within herself." She comments that the book's title places the daughter in relation to the father, but that the stories inside "shine with concise characterisations of the daughter-narrator and her relationship with her mother." This is to the extent that mother and daughter are "close together as if inhabiting a single body". All the same, critics took the book as a guide to the Moomin world; Westin comments that a Jansson book without Moomintrolls "was a challenge to some readers."

Eva Wissting, on Dagensbok.com, writes that the book is narrated entirely in the first person, from a child's point of view, but that the book is certainly meant for adults who can read between the lines of what the child says and equally what the child does. In her view, the young Jansson depicted in the book is a clever, observant and sensitive little person; the reader gets to share in everything from wonderful experiences to boredom and jealousy. For Wissting, the narrator's humanity is what makes the book work emotionally.

=== In the English-speaking world ===
Kate Kellaway, in The Guardian, comments that the book provides interesting "autobiographical fragments" that paint a picture of Jansson's parents, but that the main surprise is that "what drove Jansson's imagination was fear. This is a book of perils." Darkness becomes a monster with hands; "An eiderdown behaves like a fist. Ice breathes." Kellaway notes that on the book's publication in Finland, readers wanted to read more instalments about her life, but Jansson refused, saying that she was only interested in the child's way of seeing the world.

Claire Dickenson, in Swedish Book Review, notes that The Sculptor's Daughter is the first of Jansson's books for adults, describing her early life in a sequence of short stories set variously in Helsinki and in the Pellinki archipelago. In her view, Jansson offers a magical account, making everything enchanting. The outlines are autobiographical but some details have, she writes, been fictionalised.

== Publication history ==
The book was first published in Finland, in Swedish, by Schildts & Söderströms in 1968, becoming a best-seller there. An English translation appeared in 1969. Albert Bonniers brought out a combined edition with The Summer Book in 1996. Thirteen of the stories were reprinted (in a different order) in A Winter Book in 2006, along with stories from Jansson's other works for adults. The book has been translated into many languages, sometimes illustrated with photographs of Jansson as a child.
