= Letters from Tove =

Book of letters by Tove Jansson

- Author: Tove Jansson
- Genre: Letters
- Publisher: Sort of Books, University of Minnesota Press
- Publication date: 2014
- English publication date: 2020
- Pages: 496
- ISBN: 978-1908745842

Letters from Tove is a collection of the Finland Swedish artist and author Tove Jansson's letters, written over some 50 years of her working life. The English translation by Sarah Death was published in 2020; the original Swedish version, Brev från Tove Jansson, was published in 2014.

Jansson replied to almost all the 2,000 letters she received each year, mostly from readers; those published in the book are a small fraction of the total, and none are replies to readers. Her descriptions of people, travel, and Finland in wartime have all been praised. Evan James comments that it is a pleasure to see Jansson "hone her craft and come into her own sexually and socially".

The English version won the 2021 Bernard Shaw Prize for Sarah Death's translation.

== Synopsis ==
The book is a selection of Tove Jansson's letters, written throughout her working life. They include only letters written to close associates, with no examples of her replies to readers' letters. There is an introduction by the editors, Boel Westin and Helen Svensson. The English edition, published by Sort of Books in the UK and University of Minnesota Press in the US, is translated by Sarah Death. The book is illustrated with photographs of Jansson, scans of some of her handwritten letters, and some of her drawings.

The letters are divided into sections by date and theme as follows:

- "I do so wonder about the future": Letters to the family 1932–1933
- "I think about you all the time": Letters to the family 1938–1939
- "I am never alone when I talk to you": Letters to Eva Konikoff [a close friend] 1941–1967
- "I can see the ideas growing like trees straight through you": Letters to Atos Wirtanen [statesman, lover, then friend] 1943–1971
- "Under the names of Tofslan and Vifslan": Letters to Vivica Bandler [lover, then friend] 1946–1976
- "Do we really appreciate how lucky we are...?": Letters to Tuulikki Pietilä [life partner] 1956–1968
- "Dearest Ham": Letters to Signe Hammarsten-Jansson [mother] 1959–1967
- "A letter that you burn – please! – is better than talking": Letters to Maya Vanni [friend] 1957–1983
- "So just conceivably another book": Letters to Åke Runnquist [publisher] 1965–1988

== Reception ==
Sarah Harrison Smith, reviewing the book in The Wall Street Journal, writes that people who loved the Moomins through Tove Jansson's picture books or Moomin comic strips, or who have some knowledge of her from The Summer Book, will "find much to enjoy in this collection, which reveals Jansson as a complex, passionate, and exceptionally hardworking artist."

Jenny Tunedal, in the Swedish newspaper Aftonbladet, writes that since Jansson's life is well known to readers of her books for children and adults, this collection of letters will not provide "sensational revelations". On the other hand, she comments, it does let readers hear her voice when she is speaking to her closest associates. In her view, the book's organisation, divided both chronologically and by addressee, becomes "increasingly overwhelming and unpredictable" as one reads on. If there is a revelation, Tunedal suggests, it is not that the letters are intimate, "but in that they are written down at all." She notes that the largest section is of letters to Eva Konikoff, a Russian Jewish photographer who moved to the United States; Jansson corresponded with her throughout the Second World War. Of the book as a whole, Tunedal writes that the strength of a mother's love becomes clearer here than in any of her other writings; and that Jansson's letters can be read as "a hitherto hidden side of Tove Jansson's long and serious work to understand herself and the world. A beautiful lesson in the opportunity of friendship."

Ella Andrén, on Dagensbok.com, writes that it must have been "a delight" to exchange letters with Jansson, and that her descriptions of people are just as enjoyable as her accounts of the Moomin characters, and often quite like those. She notes that travel is a central feature, but that her accounts of Finland during the war are equally striking. Noting, too, that Jansson replied to almost all the letters she received, around 2,000 a year, she comments that the book contains only a selection, though the method of selection is not described.

Cecilia Nelson, in Göteborgs-Posten, writes that the book allows the reader to track Jansson's travels across Europe before the Second World War, and "see how the experiences are transposed into fiction."

Evan James, writing in The Yale Review, comments that "among the pleasures of these letters (which include memorable descriptions of wartime urgency and uncertainty, gossip about friends and family, and Jansson’s liberating move into her own studio), [is] watching Jansson hone her craft and come into her own sexually and socially".

The book won the 2021 Bernard Shaw Prize for Sarah Death's translation.

== See also ==
- Notes from an Island
