= A Winter Book =

2006 book by Tove Jansson

Meddelande
- Author: Tove Jansson
- Translator: Silvester Mazzarella; David McDuff; Kingsley Hart
- Language: Swedish
- Genre: Short stories
- Publisher: Bonniers
- Publication date: 1998
- English publication date: 2006
- ISBN: 978-0-9548995-2-3
- Preceded by: Letters from Klara

A Winter Book is a collection of twenty short stories by the Finland Swedish author Tove Jansson, published as Meddelande ("Messages") by Bonniers in Finland in 1998. Some of the stories had earlier been published in The Sculptor's Daughter. The English edition was published by Sort of Books in 2006.

== Contents ==
A Winter Book is arranged in three sections, "Snow", "Flotsam and Jetsam" and "Travelling Light". The stories include "Squirrel", in which a woman's isolated life on an island is shared for a time with a squirrel, and the last story, "Taking Leave", in which two women realise that they have become too frail to spend their summers on the island they love. There is an introduction by the English novelist Ali Smith and afterwords by the English authors Philip Pullman, Esther Freud, and Frank Cottrell Boyce.

Snow

- "The Stone" (from Sculptor's Daughter)
- "Parties" (from Sculptor's Daughter)
- "The Dark" (from Sculptor's Daughter)
- "Snow" (from Sculptor's Daughter)
- "German Measles" (from Sculptor's Daughter)
- "Flying" (from Sculptor's Daughter)
- "Annie" (from Sculptor's Daughter)

Flotsam and Jetsam

- "The Iceberg" (from Sculptor's Daughter)
- "Albert" (from Sculptor's Daughter)
- "Flotsam and Jetsam" (from Sculptor's Daughter)
- "High Water" (from Sculptor's Daughter)
- Jeremiah (from Sculptor's Daughter)
- "The Spinster Who Had an Idea" (from Sculptor's Daughter)
- "The Boat and Me"

Travelling Light

- "The Squirrel" (from The Listener)
- "Letters from Klara" (from Letters from Klara)
- "Messages"
- "Correspondence" (from Travelling Light)
- "Travelling Light" (from Travelling Light)
- "Taking Leave" (extract from Notes from an Island)

== Analysis ==
The stories, some of which had not previously been published in English, were selected by Ali Smith, who also wrote the book's introduction and had previously reviewed The Summer Book for The Guardian. Thirteen of them are from Jansson's first book for adults, Sculptor's Daughter (1968). The original title piece, "Message", is a partially fictionalised compilation of letters Jansson had received. They were translated into English from Swedish by Silvester Mazzarella, David McDuff and Kingsley Hart.

In a review for The Guardian, Josh Lacey described it as a "short, brittle book" and "an oddly satisfying jumble" featuring several of Jansson's recurring tropes: "strange creatures with surprising powers, islands and small boats and the sea, loneliness and introspection, the vital influence of art and the imagination". Sean Michaels for The Skinny said it was "in large part exceptional". Philip Pullman described the stories as "tough as old rope" in the afterword he wrote for the book.

The novelist Jeanette Winterson wrote that the book "is full of secrets", from "the obsessions of old age" to the "solitary happiness[es]" like "a bare rock and an open sea". She adds that she takes pleasure in Jansson's combination of "practical matter-of-factness, set against the most wonderful excesses."

== Sources ==
- Winterson, Jeanette (11 November 2006). "The Winter Book". Jeanette Winterson. Archived from the original on 23 December 2017.
