= Themes in Tove Jansson's writing =

Scholars and critics have identified several themes in Tove Jansson's writing. These include the broad range of conflicting emotions dealt with in her books; existential threats; a feeling of invisibility; and the acceptance of a diversity of sexualities in her characters, several of whom have real-life counterparts.

== Mixed emotions ==
Critics have noted that Tove Jansson's books convey a full range of emotions, often combining opposing emotions. Her Finn Family Moomintroll (Trollkarlens hatt) for example addresses childhood reality directly with moments of both terror and joy. It achieves this in a framework of Moominmamma's unconditional love.

In Moominland Midwinter (Trollvinter), the protagonist Moomintroll is variously lonely, miserable, angry, and scared – the result of being forced to survive in a world to which he feels he does not belong.

In Moominpappa at Sea (Pappan och havet), by contrast, the philosopher Sanna Tirkkonen identifies the predominant emotion as loneliness. In her view, feeling lonely is an interactive process; in the emotional environment in Moominpappa and the Sea, loneliness presents itself in different ways, and the characters try to heal their own loneliness, and that of others, by varying methods.

In the final Moomin volume, Moominvalley in November (Sent i november), the main themes have been identified as loss, and the finiteness of life, as the orphaned Toft goes around looking for a mother, while everyone else has to carry on without knowing whether they will ever see the missing Moomin family again.

== Existential threats ==
The early Moomin books mention serious threats to the continued existence of Moominvalley. The first volume, The Moomins and the Great Flood, was published in 1945 after years of war, with Finland facing the threat of invasion by the Soviet Union.

The comet in Jansson's Comet in Moominland (Kometjakten) has been suspected of being an allegory of nuclear weapons. The first version of the book was written before those weapons were first used in 1945, so the dangerous threat reflects a more general fear of war and the possible occupation of Finland by the Soviet Union. Jansson's revisions of the text in 1956 and 1968 clearly indicate that her concern had shifted to the threat of worldwide nuclear war. More innocently, the text could recall the meteorite that struck Finland in 1899.

== Freedom and morality ==
Jansson was determined to be free, and placed her personal freedom above both public opinion and her relationships. In her writings, she was hostile to human-made rules and prohibitions, and created characters who did not always comply with the law. The Moomins attracted criticism both because the Moominfamily were depicted in too bourgeois a way, and because they could be rude, used swear-words, drank alcohol, and smoked tobacco.

Finn Family Moomintroll, written in peacetime, was a happier book, without the dire existential threats of the earlier Moomin books. Instead, it addressed the differences of opinion between the Moominvalley characters, and issues of justice, law, right and wrong, and morality, based on Jansson's own experience.

== Invisibility ==
The Moomin characters Sniff and Moomintroll, who is wearing an artist's beret, discuss wanting not to be famous. Moomintroll is seen as a self-portrait of the author and artist Tove Jansson.

Jansson's biographer Boel Westin writes that by 1961, both Jansson's paintings and her books had taken on a single theme: the invisible. Moominland Midwinter told of a Moomintroll who wanted to feel the invisible environment, and Westin comments that Jansson was taking the Moomin family off-stage, writing instead "about those who moved on the fringes, like Toffle". In one of her comic strips, Moomintroll, wearing an artist's beret, remarks "I don't want to be famous". Then in Moominvalley in November, the whole Moominfamily has vanished; at the same time, Jansson had in Westin's view "made herself invisible as a painter": critics could only see Moominmamma, not the artist. Her paintings at this time were "dissolved forms, blurring any direct representation, letting anyone who liked imagine themes for themselves." Her 1960 picture book Who Will Comfort Toffle? has as its theme "finding oneself and achieving visibility". Finally, the 1962 story collection called in Swedish The Invisible Child (published in English as Tales from Moominvalley), reflects Jansson's desire to express herself free of the Moomins, away from being a children's author, or as Westin puts it "to render the child invisible". Indeed, her Moomin books are read by adults as well as children.

== Sexualities ==
What the Moomin website calls "queer themes" run through Jansson's life, art, and writings. The characters in her Moomin books have a wide range of gender roles, accepted as natural in the children's books. Thingumy and Bob, an inseparable pair of small creatures with a private language and a shared secret, were named in the original Swedish Tofslan and Vifslan, for Tove and Vivica. Vivica Bandler was a married woman with whom Jansson had "fallen madly in love". Tofslan and Vifslan were the pet names that Tove used in her letters. The couple's secret, the King's ruby, a large red gem that only they could look at, has been seen as a symbol of their relationship.

Another relationship in the Moomin books is that between Moomintroll and Snufkin. Moomintroll wants to be with Snufkin all the time; Snufkin is happy being alone. One interpretation is that Moomintroll represents Jansson, and Snufkin her lover the politician Atos Wirtanen, a man who Jansson wanted to marry. Another view is that Snufkin too is a part of Jansson, the independent and unconventional artist.

Jansson described some traditional gender roles, such as those of Moominmamma and Moominpappa – always motherly and manly respectively, and often seen as portraits of her parents – and conventional heterosexual relationships, such as Moomintroll's with Snorkmaiden. The Moomin newspaper comic strip Moomin and the Sea develops the relationship, only hinted at in the book Moominpappa at Sea, to the extent that Jansson grew tired of the heterosexual romance that was required in the comic strip.

Other roles, like the dress-wearing hemulens, whether male or female, are less conventional. Mymble is certainly female, but her Swedish name Mymlan alludes to mymla, the word Jansson used for having sex of any kind: Mymble has certainly had a lot of it, as she has at least 30 children. One character's name directly hints at a "queer theme": Too-Ticky represents Jansson's lifelong lover Tuulikki Pietilä, nicknamed Tooti. In Moominland Midwinter, Too-Ticky tells Moomintroll about the creatures who are active in the winter world while others are hibernating. One interpretation of this is that this winter life stands for the queer activities that had to stay out of sight, as they were illegal in Finland when the book was written. Jansson however described the strange cold world as a picture of the world of commerce that she had to learn to manage as her books became more successful.

The people behind Moomin characters

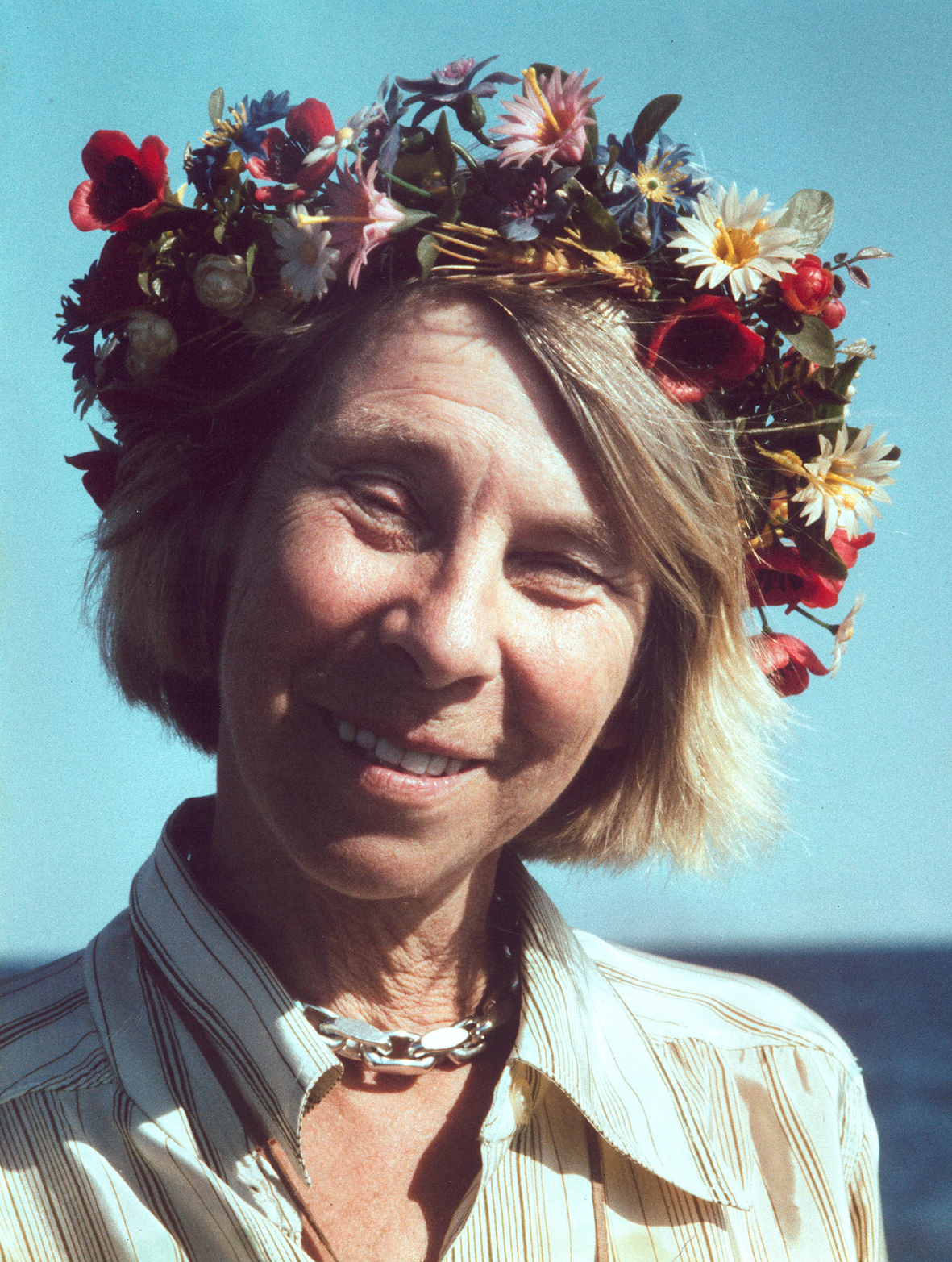
Tofslan ("Thingumy"),
Tove Jansson

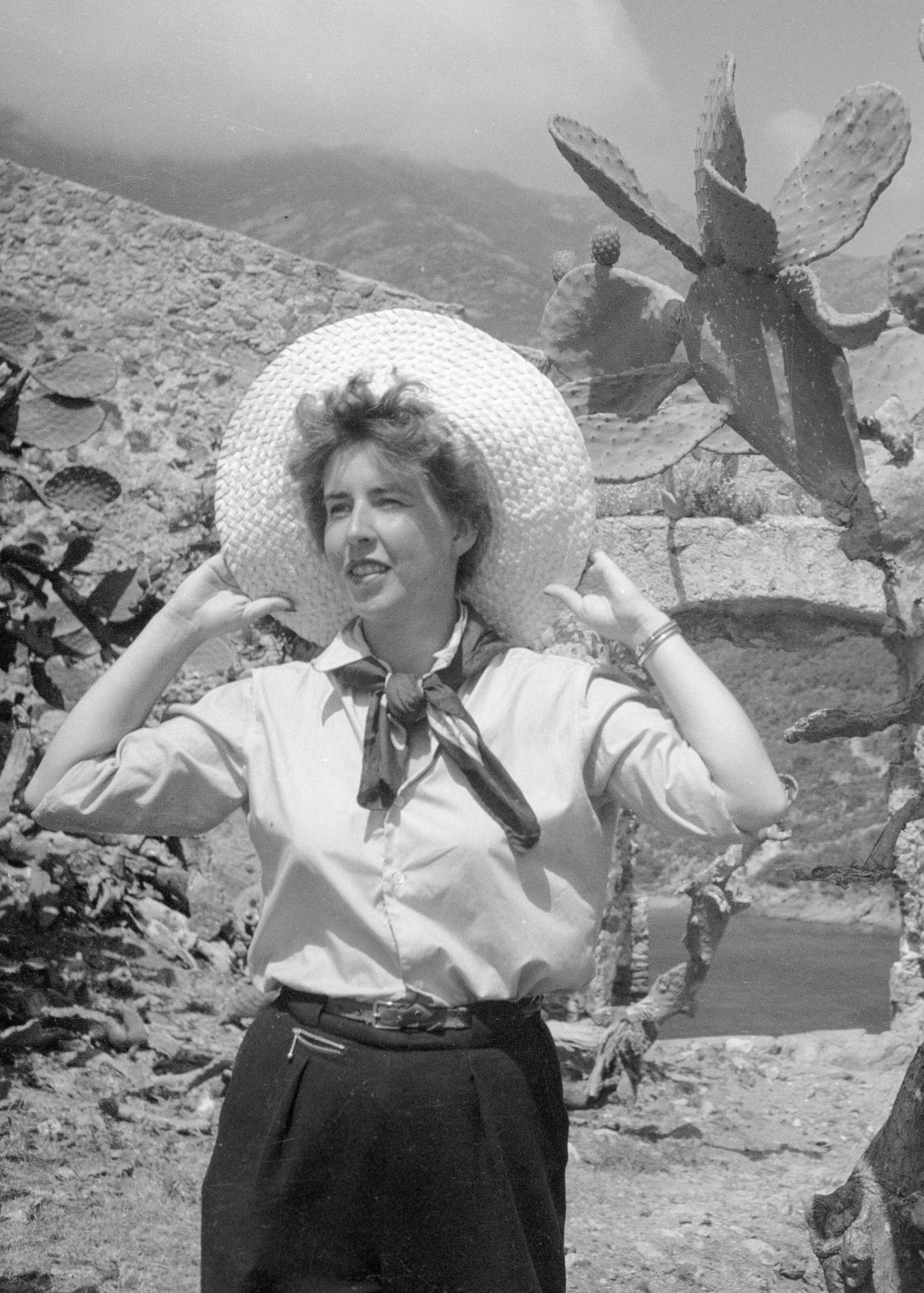
Vifslan ("Bob"),
Vivica Bandler,
one of Jansson's lovers

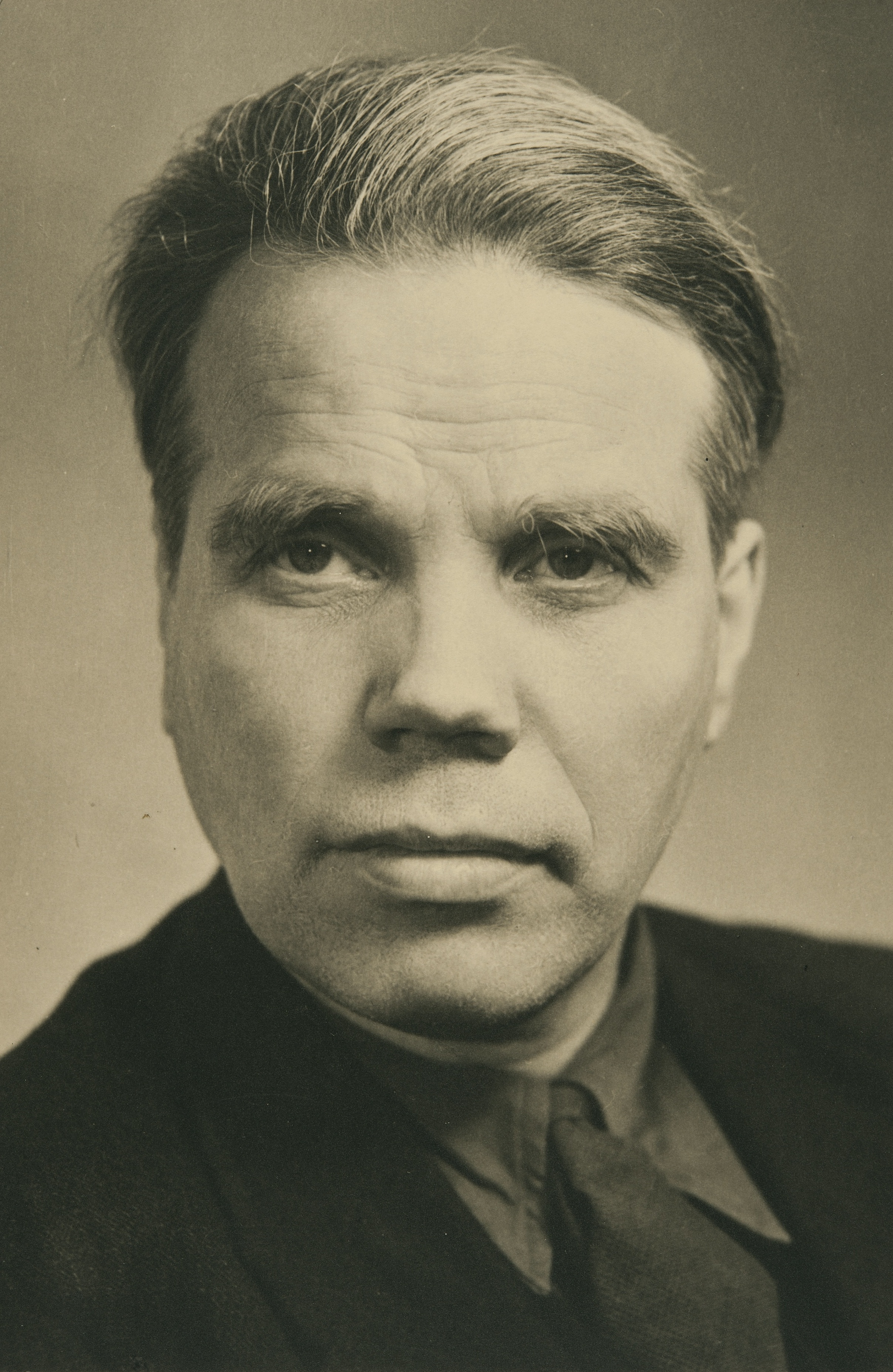
"Snufkin",
Atos Wirtanen,
one of Jansson's lovers

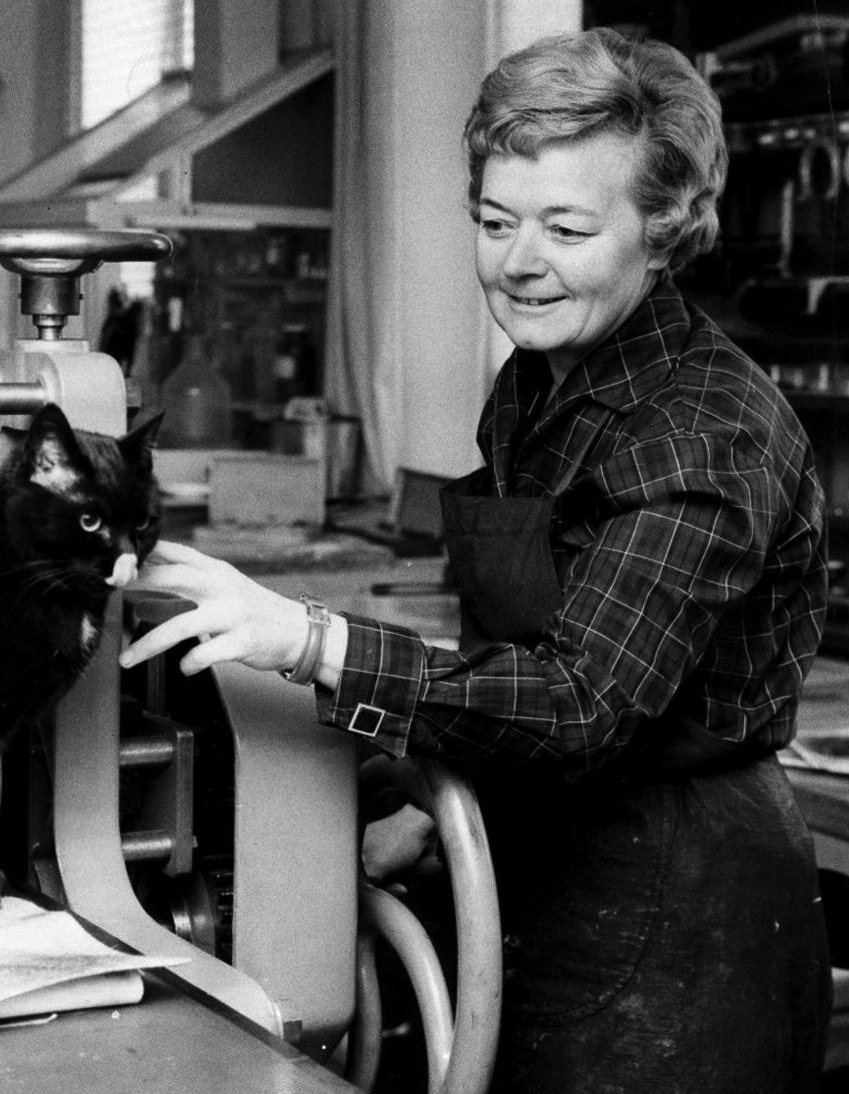
"Too-Ticky",
Tuulikki Pietilä,
Jansson's life partner

== Sources ==
- Karjalainen, Tuula (2016) [2013]. Tove Jansson: Work and Love. Penguin Books. ISBN 978-0-141-97882-6.
- Westin, Boel (2014). Tove Jansson, Life, Art, Words: The Authorised Biography. Translated by Mazzarella, Silvester. Sort of Books. ISBN 978-1-908745-45-3.
