= Theodor Kallifatides =

Greek-Swedish writer (born 1938)

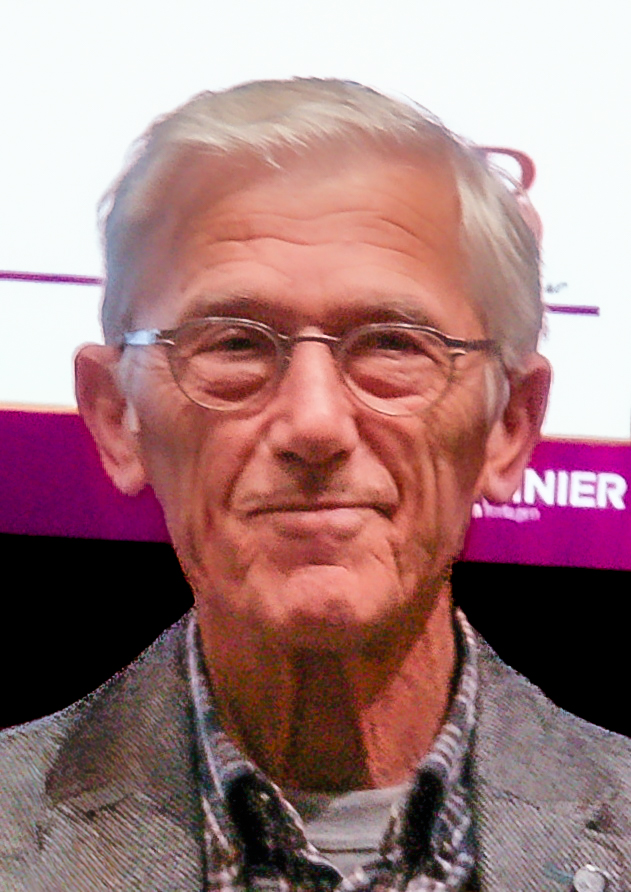
Theodor Kallifatides, 2018

Kallifatides presenting himself at the Gothenburg Book Fair 2012.

Theodor Kallifatides (Greek: Θοδωρής Καλλιφατίδης, born 1938) is a writer. He is a Greek immigrant to Sweden, and writes in Swedish.

== Biography ==
Kallifatides was born in the village of Molaoi, in Laconia, Greece, in 1938. His father was Dimitrios Kallifatides, a teacher originating from the Pontus region, and his mother was Antonia Kyriazakou, from Molaoi. In 1946, he and his family moved to Athens, where he finished high school and studied in Karolos Koun's theatrical school. He emigrated to Sweden in 1964 and has lived in the country ever since. He studied philosophy, and lectured at Stockholm University between 1969 and 1972; later he was chief of Bonniers literary magazine between 1972 and 1976.

Kallifatides made his literary debut in 1969 with a poetry book, but gained recognition mainly through his subsequently published novels. He has published novels, poetry collections, travel essays and plays. He has written film scripts and has directed a film.

Kallifatides has received numerous awards for his works, which usually revolve around his experience of Greece and of being Greek in a foreign country, and almost all his works have been translated; some have been published in more than twenty languages.

== Works in English ==
- Peasants and Masters, 1990. (Swedish: Bönder och herrar, 1973, translated by Thomas Teal). ISBN 978-0940242371
- With the Coolness of Her Lips. (Swedish: Med sina läppars svalka, 2014.)
- Another Life: On Memory, Language, Love, and the Passage of Time., 2018. Other Press (Swedish: Ännu ett liv, 2017, translated by Marlaine Delargy). 304 pp. ISBN 9781590519455
- The Siege of Troy. A Novel, 2019. Other Press (Swedish: Slaget om Troja, 2018, translated by Marlaine Delargy). 304 pp. ISBN 978-1-59051-971-4
