= Thomas Teal =

Translator

Thomas Teal is a translator, known for his translations of over 20 books from Swedish into English. He won the 2011 Best Translated Book Award in fiction for his translation The True Deceiver of Tove Jansson's 1982 novel Den ärliga bedragaren, and the Bernard Shaw Translation prize twice for other works by Jansson.

== Biography ==
Thomas Teal is a translator from Swedish into English. In the 1960s he lived in Finland, meeting the artist and author Tove Jansson; he has translated six of her books. Later he moved to Massachusetts.

== Awards and distinctions ==
Teal won the 2011 Best Translated Book Award in fiction for his translation The True Deceiver of Tove Jansson's 1982 novel Den ärliga bedragaren. He won the Bernard Shaw Translation prize twice for other works by Jansson, including Fair Play (the 1989 novel Rent Spel).

The Scottish novelist Ali Smith praises Teal's English translation of Jansson's The Summer Book as "original and stunning".

== Translations ==
Teal's translations include:

Tove Jansson's books

- The Summer Book
- Sun City
- The True Deceiver
- Fair Play
- Art in Nature
- Notes from an Island
- Letters from Klara
- The Listener

Other authors' books

- Birgit Nilsson: My Memoirs in Pictures
- The Abominable Man (Maj Sjöwall, Per Wahlöö)
- Cop Killer (Maj Sjöwall, Per Wahlöö)
- Ice (Ulla-Lena Lundberg)
- The Fly Trap (Fredrik Sjöberg, about René Malaise)
- Peasants and Masters (Theodor Kallifatides)
- The Other Germans: Report From an East German Town (Hans Axel Holm)
