= Sam Vanni =

Finnish painter (1908–1992)

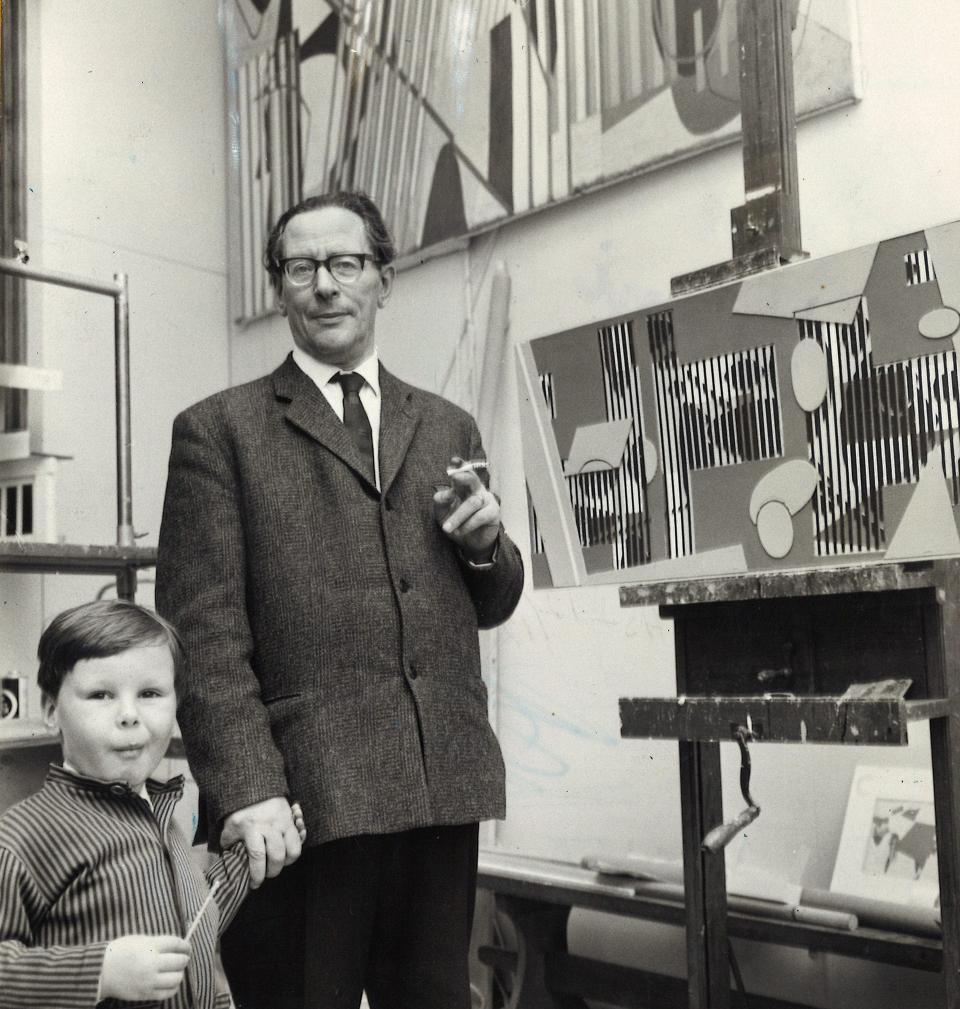
- Sam Vanni in 1964 with his son Mikko
- Born: Samuel Besprosvanni; 6 July 1908; Vyborg, Grand Duchy of Finland
- Died: 20 October 1992 (aged 84); Helsinki, Finland
- Known for: Painting, graphics, sculpture
- Spouse(s): Maya London (1941–1958); Paula Saarenheimo (1960–)
- Awards: Pro Finlandia

Sam Vanni (until 1941 Samuel Besprosvanni; 6 July 1908 – 20 October 1992) was a Finnish painter. He is considered to be the pioneer of abstract art in Finland.

Samuel Besprosvanni was born in Vyborg. His parents were fur trader Aron Besprosvanni and Rakel Stoler. Besprosvanni was multi-lingual since his early childhood. Of Jewish origin, his home language was Yiddish, but he went to a Swedish school and most of his friends were speaking Finnish. The Besprosvanni family moved to Helsinki in 1921 and in 1927 Samuel started studies in the Academy of Fine Arts. Later he studied in the Accademia di Belle Arti in Florence and was a private student of the sculptor Wäinö Aaltonen. In 1931 his works were displayed in an annual Finnish Art Society exhibition.

From 1938 to 1939 Vanni lived in London and Paris, where he attended the Académie Julian and Académie de la Grande Chaumière. In the 1940s Vanni started to move towards more abstract art. He was especially influenced by French artists like Henri Matisse and Pierre Bonnard. Sam Vanni was an active painter until his death in 1992. He was awarded by the Pro Finlandia and invited in the Academy of Finland in 1964.

In the 1930s he was married to Maya Vanni, who like Sam was a friend of the artist and author Tove Jansson; Sam was also one of Jansson's lovers in that period.
