= Swedish Book Review =

- Subject: Literature
- Language: English

Publication details
- History: 1983–present
- Publisher: St. David's University College, Norvik Press
- Frequency: Biannually

Standard abbreviations
- ISO 4: Swed. Book Rev.

Indexing
- ISSN: 0265-8119

Links
- Journal homepage

The Swedish Book Review is a literary journal, first appearing in 1983. Its founding publisher was St. David's University College in Lampeter. Then it began to be published by Norvik Press, which was formerly based at the University of East Anglia and then at the Department of Scandinavian Studies at University College London.

The journal is published twice yearly. These issues come out in spring and autumn and are prepared for the London Book Fair and the Frankfurt Book Fair, respectively. In addition, a specialised “supplement” edition is produced each year.

The journal aims to bring Swedish-language literature – including Swedish literature and Finland-Swedish literature – to an English-speaking audience, and does so through reviews, translations, and features dealing with Swedish literary matters.

== See also ==
- List of literary magazines
