= Tuulikki Pietilä =

Finnish artist (1917–2009)

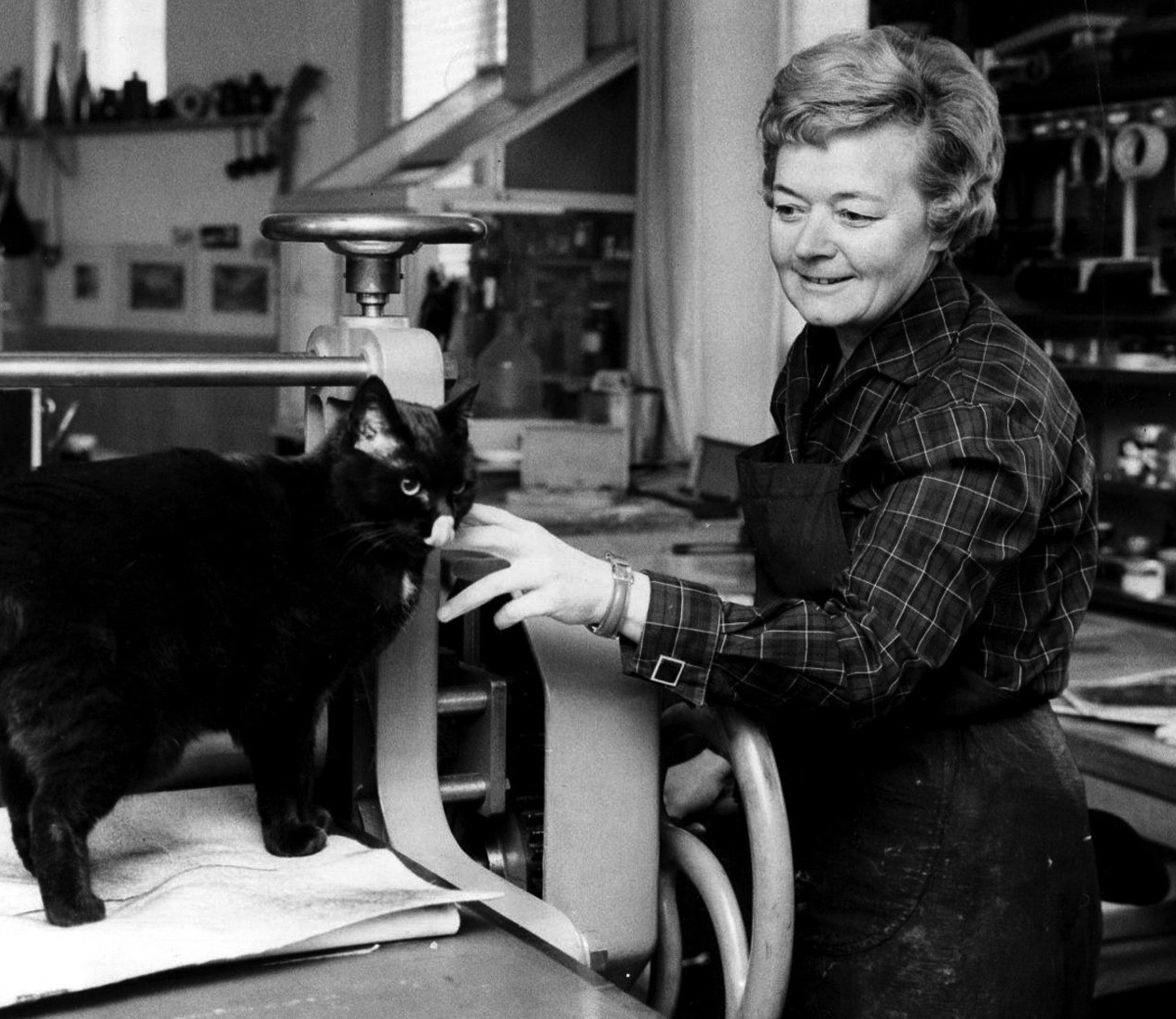
- Pietilä in 1964
- Born: 18 February 1917; Seattle, Washington, U.S.
- Died: 23 February 2009 (aged 92); Helsinki, Finland
- Education: Konstfack; Fernand Léger Art Academy; Academy of Fine Arts, Helsinki
- Partner: Tove Jansson

Ida Helmi Tuulikki Pietilä (18 February 1917 – 23 February 2009) was a Finnish graphic artist and professor. Pietilä is considered one of Finland's most influential graphic artists, with her work being shown in multiple art exhibitions. She worked as a teacher at the Academy of Fine Arts, Helsinki, and later trained graphic artists and wrote multiple books about graphic arts. She worked in metal engraving, woodcut, lithography and serigraphy.

== Personal ==
Pietilä was born in Seattle in the United States, before moving with her Finnish parents to Finland as a child. Pietilä had a brother, Reima Pietilä, who was a noted architect. She died in 2009 in Helsinki, at the age of 92. She bequeathed more than 1,400 pieces of art to Ateneum.

== Career ==
Pietilä started her studies at Turku School of Drawing (now the TUAS Arts Academy at Turku University of Applied Sciences), where she attended between 1933 and 1936. She went on to study at the drawing school of the Finnish Art Association between 1936 and 1940; the University College of Arts, Crafts and Design in Stockholm between 1945 and 1949; and the Fernand Léger Art Academy in Paris between 1949 and 1953. During her studies she met the artist Tove Jansson, who later became her life partner.

Pietilä's work used media including woodcuts and linographs, and multiple styles such as realism and cubism. The first exhibition of Pietilä's work was held in Turku in 1935 when she was a student. Her first private exhibition was in 1951. From 1967, she participated in the Purnu group's summer exhibitions, and a retrospective exhibition of her work there was held in 1986. Pietilä garnered acclaim for her work, and was awarded the Order of the Lion of Finland in 1963. She became a professor at the Academy of Fine Arts, Helsinki, where she had previously been a student, in 1982.

== Relationship with Tove Jansson ==
Pietilä met the artist and author Tove Jansson in 1955; they went on to become lifelong partners until Jansson's death in 2001. Pietilä and Jansson collaborated on many projects, including many related to Jansson's characters, the Moomins. 43 three-dimensional pieces created by Pietilä are now exhibited at the Moomin Museum in Tampere. Pietilä is believed to be the inspiration for the character Too-Ticky in the Moomin books.

Pietilä and Jansson spent many summers on the small island of Klovharun in Pellinki; these travels were documented by Pietilä in several hours of film. Several documentaries have been made from this footage, including Haru, yksinäinen saari (Haru, the lonely island, 1998) and Tove ja Tooti Euroopassa (Tove and Tooti in Europe, 2004).

Pietilä was Jansson's companion at the Presidential Palace's Independence Day reception in 1992. They have retrospectively been described as being the first female same-sex couple to attend the event as guests.
