= Tove Jansson Life, Art, Words =

2014 biography

Cover of first English edition, 2014

Tove Jansson Life, Art, Words: The Authorised Biography is a biography of the artist and author Tove Jansson by Boel Westin, who studied Jansson's letters and published an edition of them. It was published by Albert Bonniers Förlag in 2007 in Swedish as Tove Jansson: Ord, bild, liv. The English translation by Silvester Mazzarella was published in the UK by Sort of Books in 2014.

The book was welcomed by critics, who respected its detailed coverage and the quality of Westin's writing. The review in the Financial Times noted that the Moomins were Jansson's legacy, but that the book showed in a balanced way her career as a fiction writer for adults and as an artist, well supported by photographs and images of her artwork. The review in Svenska Dagbladet, however, suggested that the amount of detail obscured the overall picture.

== Synopsis ==
Tove Jansson Life, Art, Words is described in the book's subtitle as the authorised biography of Tove Jansson. It makes use of the access she allowed the scholar of literature Boel Westin to her archives, letters, and journals, along with many conversations, to create a portrait of Jansson's life, work, family, and friends. The book covers Jansson's interrupted education; becoming a painter during the Second World War; the rise of the Moomins in children's books, comic strips, adaptations for film and theatre, and merchandise; her other books; and her personal life with Tuulikki Pietilä. The introductory chapter serves as an overview of Jansson's life as well as of the book. The rest of the chapters are somewhat thematic but arranged broadly in chronological order.

== Westin's sources ==
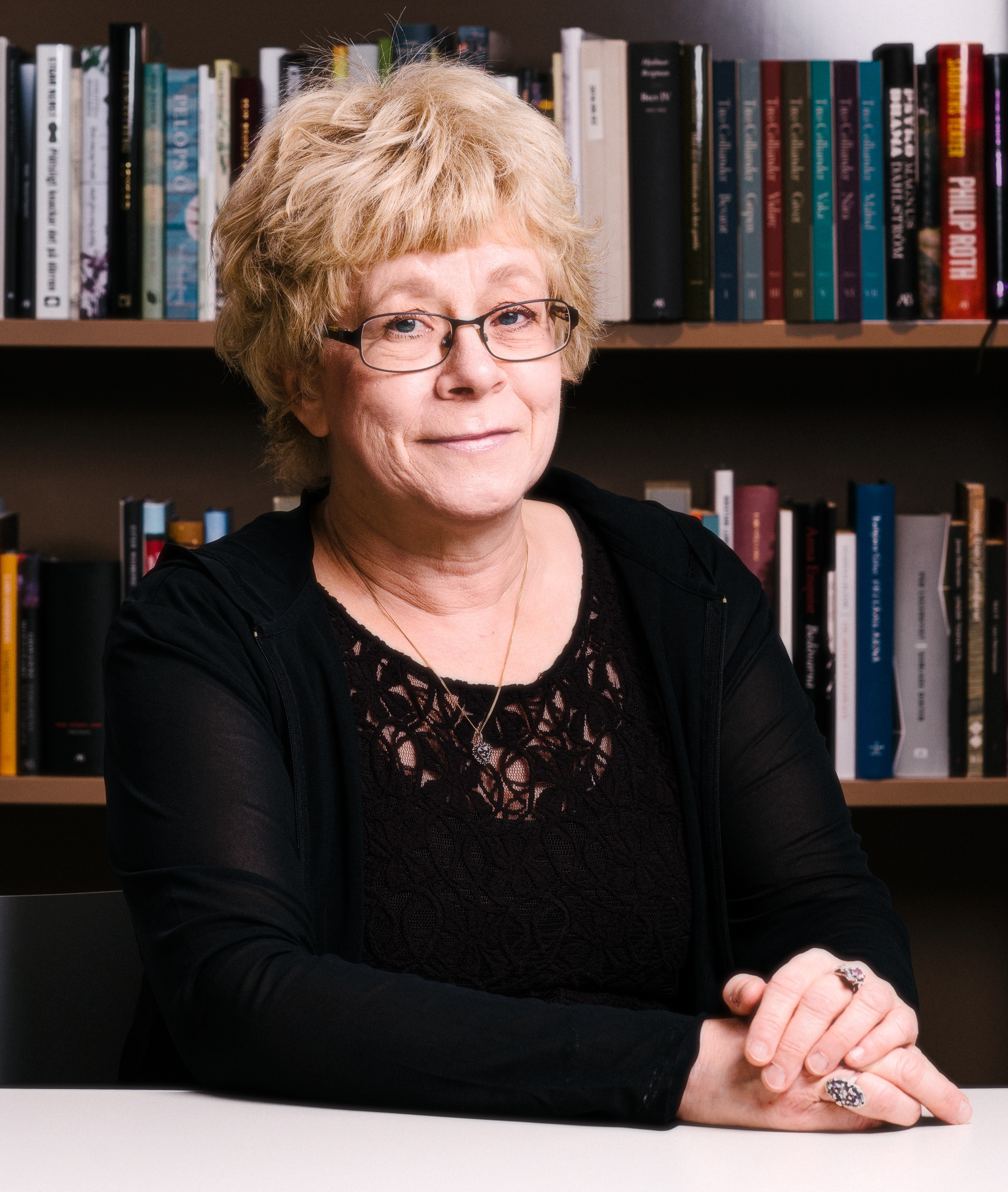
The book's author, Boel Westin, had access to Jansson's archives, and extensive assistance from Jansson's life partner, Tuulikki Pietilä.

Westin acknowledges the help she received from the various Jansson archives; from Sophia Jansson, who let her work in Tove Jansson's studio and personal archive; and from Pietilä, who "helped me in every imaginable way" with "an enormous amount of information" including highly personal material. Westin dedicates the book to Pietilä, and states that she was only able to write the book because Tove Jansson "had confidence in me".

== Reception ==
Sue Prideaux, reviewing the book for The Guardian, describes it as "an affectionate biography." She notes that Westin compares Jansson to "Shakespeare, James Joyce, Virginia Woolf, even 'Chekhov spiced with Poe'". She at once adds that Jansson does not need any such references, since the popularity of her stories makes her ability to write well "self-evident".

The literary journal Books from Finland notes that Tove Jansson Life, Art, Words had appeared in time for the centenary of Jansson's birth, focusing mainly on her writing, along with Tuula Karjalainen's Tove Jansson: Work and Love which in its opinion looked mainly at her painting.

James Lovegrove in the Financial Times writes that there was more to Jansson than the Moomins, even though those are her "lasting legacy". In his view, the book succeeds in providing a balanced coverage of her different lines of work, "as a painter, cartoonist, muralist, memoirist and writer of fiction for adults." Lovegrove finds it appropriate, given Jansson's balance between image and words that the book is richly illustrated with photographs and her artwork.

The Lesbrary's review of the book states that Boel Westin's "considered pen" brings a "complicated, innovative creative in resolute pursuit of independence" to life. It finds Westin's account of "her fierce dedication to preserving her integrity as a creator" inspiring, and calls Tove Jansson Life, Art, Words "meticulously researched but rarely dry, ... a book for Moomin fans and art history lovers alike."

Lena Kåreland, reviewing Tove Jansson – Ord, bild, liv for Samlaren, writes that perhaps ord and bild ('word' and 'image') could change places in the title, (Note: The English translation of the book's subtitle has reversed the order of the three words.) but that there was no doubt that it was painting that lay closest to Jansson's heart – even if the public liked the Moomin books best. She notes that the biography proceeds chronologically. (Note: This is unlike Tuula Karjalainen's biography of Jansson, which proceeds thematically.) Kåreland comments that "Westin shows with both sensitivity and sharpness how Tove Jansson always arouses strong emotions in her books", describing a universal longing. She adds that Westin shows how Jansson's constant self-renewal and her tireless energy for new projects made her output so diverse: Westin provides, she writes, both an overview of Jansson's life and meaty analysis of individual works. Kåreland concludes that readers can simply be grateful.

Carl Otto Werkelid, in Svenska Dagbladet, writes that Westin's biography of Jansson provides a wealth of detail, which however tends to obscure the overall picture of the artist.

Nina Lekander, in Expressen, describes the book as "THE biography" ( [sic], with just these two words in English) of "this our Finland-Swedish world-famous author and artistic genius." She comments that it is hard to describe either a nearly 600-page book or 86 years of a highly creative life, but that Westin makes the reader want to read more and to explore the many hints in Jansson's books that the biography unlocks.

== See also ==
- Tove Jansson: Work and Love – biography by Tuula Karjalainen

== Sources ==
- Westin, Boel (2007). Tove Jansson : ord, bild, liv. Albert Bonniers Förlag. ISBN 978-9100113254.
- Westin, Boel (2014). Tove Jansson: Life, Art, Words. Sort of Books. ISBN 978-1-908745-45-3.
- Westin, Boel; Svensson, Helen (2014). Letters from Tove. Schildts & Söderströms.
