= Boel Westin =

Scholar of children's literature

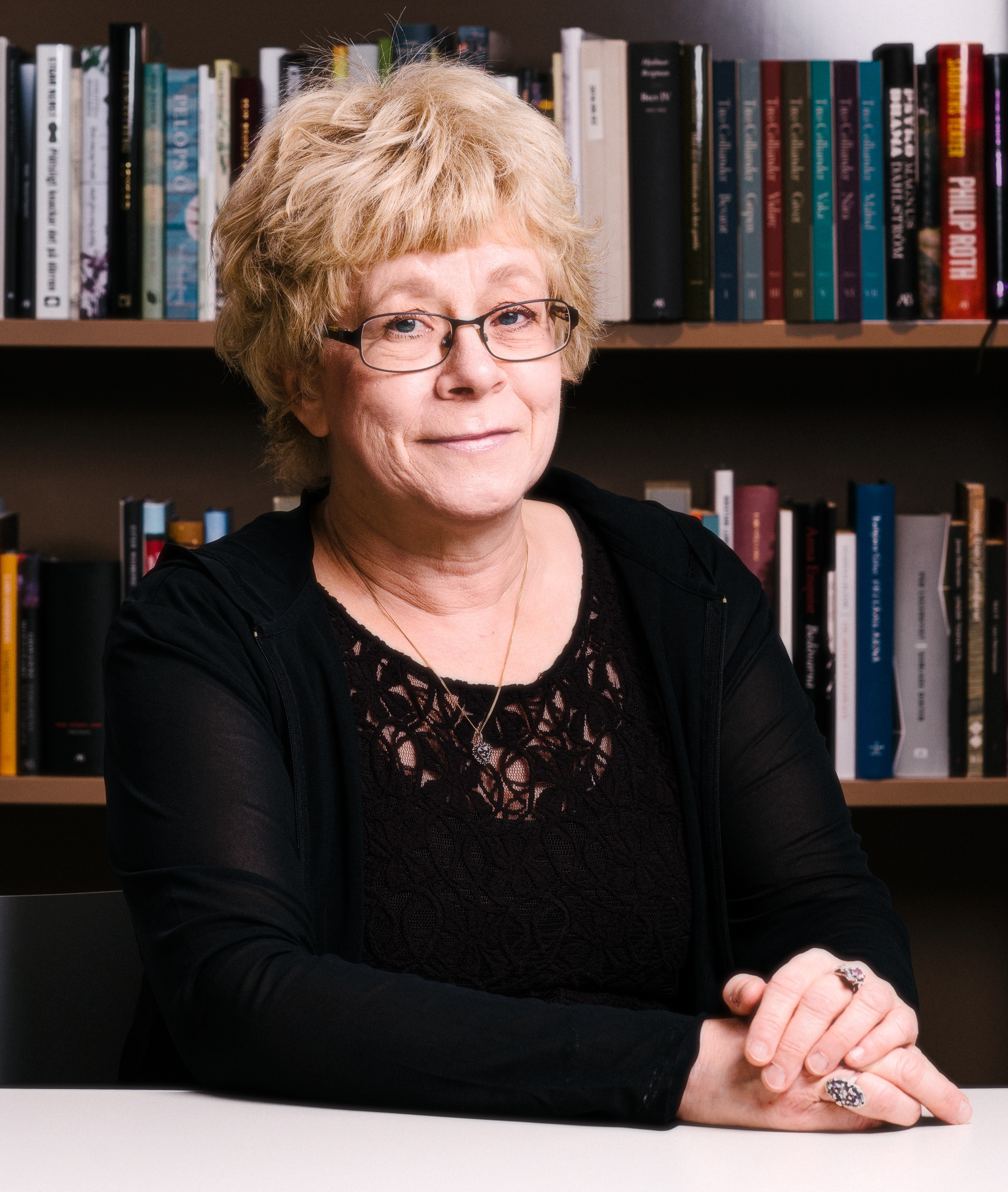
- In 2014
- Born: 14 April 1951 (age 75); Sweden
- Occupation: Scholar of literature
- Years active: 20th century
- Known for: Tove Jansson Life, Art, Words; Letters from Tove

Academic background
- Thesis: Family in the Valley (1988)
- Website: https://www.su.se/profiles/b/bwest

Ingrid Boel Margareta Westin, born 14 April 1951, is a Swedish scholar of children's literature. She became a professor in 1999, retiring in 2018. She is known for her biography Tove Jansson Life, Art, Words, and for the edited collection of Jansson's letters, Letters from Tove.

== Biography ==
Boel Westin is the daughter of the historian Gunnar T. Westin and the nurse Brita Westin, née Erwe. She focused on literary science and has established herself as an international expert on Tove Jansson's writing and artistry. She wrote the first doctoral thesis on Jansson, Family in the Valley (1988); later she published the authorised biography, Tove Jansson Life, Art, Words (2007). It has been translated into several languages. Westin, as the first researcher, had access to Jansson's private archive. Westin wrote her first academic paper on Jansson in 1974 and has published a collection of Jansson's letters, Letters from Tove (2014).

Her genre study Strindberg, the saga and the writing was published in 1998; she has written several essays on August Strindberg. She was editor of the Strindberg Society's journal Strindbergiana from 1995 to 1996. Her research areas include older literature for children and young people, literature and philosophy, self-portraits, and animal stories.

Westin was the main editor of The history of Swedish children’s and youth literature, a collaboration between Stockholm University and the Swedish Children’s Books Institute, between 2009 and 2024. She was head of department at the Department of Literature and History of Science and Ideas at Stockholm University 2009–2013. Between 1986 and 2010 she was a reviewer for the newspaper Dagens Nyheter. She was chair of Sweden's University and Higher Education Office's expert group for a national evaluation of doctoral programmes in literature from 2018 to 2019. She has been a member of review panels for research at the Riksbank's Jubilee Fund and the Swedish Research Council. and has been a member of the jury for the Nordic Council Literature Prize.

Westin was appointed chairman of the jury for the Astrid Lindgren Memorial Award in 2014.

== Works ==
- 1985 – I bilderbokens värld (editor, with Kristin Hallberg). Liber förlag.
- 1988 – Böcker ska blänka som solar (editor). Rabén & Sjögren.
- 1988 – Familjen i dalen. Tove Janssons muminvärld (doktorsavhandling). Bonniers.
- 1991/96 – Children's literature in Sweden. Swedish Institute.
- 1994 – Om flickor för flickor. Den svenska flickboken (editor, with Ying Toijer-Nilsson). Rabén & Sjögren.
- 1998 – Strindberg, sagan och skriften. Symposion.
- 2001 – Strindberg and Fiction, co-edited, Almqvist & Wiksell.
- 2009 – Ordens negativ (co-edited). Symposion.
- 2010 – Otryckt och omtryckt. Pippis intentioner, Strindbergs perspektiv, Becketts kombinationer och Hans nådes tider (co-edited). Symposion.
- 2011 – Vandring genom tiden (co-edited). Symposion.
- 2014 [2007] – Tove Jansson Life, Art, Words, Sort of Books.
- 2019 [2014] – Letters from Tove, edited by Boel Westin and Helen Svensson, Sort of Books; University of Minnesota Press, 2020.
- 2024 – Den svenska barn- och ungdomslitteraturens historia, parts 1 and 2 (editor). Natur & kultur.

== Awards and distinctions ==
- 1989 – Swedish Royal Academy of Letters prize for scholarship
- 2007 – Astrid Lindgren prize
- 2008 – Gulliver prize
- 2011 – Schückska prize
- 2011 – Festschrift I litteraturens underland (Makadam)
