= Tove Jansson: Work and Love =

2013 biography

Penguin edition, 2016

Tove Jansson: Work and Love is a biography of the Finnish-Swedish artist and author Tove Jansson by Tuula Karjalainen. It was first published in Finnish as Tove Jansson: Tee Työtä ja Rakasta by Tammi in 2013. The English translation by David McDuff was published by Particular Books in 2014 and in paperback by Penguin Books in 2016.

== Synopsis ==
Tove Jansson: Work and Love describes Tove Jansson's life and work partly chronologically, partly thematically. It begins with an account of her parents and her early upbringing in an artistic household. It then describes her youth and life in wartime, and her twin goals of work and love, using materials such as her correspondence with Eva Konikoff who had emigrated to the US. It then looks at her creation of the Moomins, and how they brought her to fame. Karjalainen describes her personal life with her partner, the artist Tuulikki Pietilä, and her return to painting after a long interval of working on the Moomins. The book then examines how she found artistic freedom as a master of line and as a colourist, and her books for adults, which were often about children, while her children's books were often partly for adults. The book provides a chronology of Jansson's life.

== Reception ==
The literary journal Books from Finland noted that Tove Jansson: Work and Love had appeared in time for the centenary of Jansson's birth, focusing mainly on her painting, along with Boel Westin's biography which looked mainly at her writing.

The Economist's review stated that "Jansson always saw herself first as a serious painter", noting that while her writing was appreciated elsewhere, it was little-known in Finland. It opined that Karjalainen as a Finnish art historian was more interested in Jansson's art than her writing, which was "a pity".

Penni Cotton, reviewing the book for Libri et liberi, wrote that it would surprise readers, showing that children's books were just a small fraction of Jansson's output. Cotton notes that as well, Jansson created "cartoon strips, stamps, theatre productions, films, adult novels and her greatest love – paintings." She stated that the English translation was timed to coincide with two Jansson exhibitions in the UK. In her view, the thematic approach by chapter was "extremely illuminating ... [but] the time frame jumps around quite a lot, causing much repetition of events and reversal in time, which is somewhat confusing." On the other hand, she writes, the illustrations and early photographs are both informative and beautiful. Cotton concludes that Tove Jansson: Work and Love shows "how much of Tove Jansson there is in all her stories", and in all her characters, influenced by her friends and family. The biography, she suggests, opens up "an Aladdin's cave" of details about Jansson unknown to readers who think of her only as a children's author.

== Translations ==
The biography was first published in Finnish as Tove Jansson: Tee Työtä ja Rakasta by Tammi in 2013. The English translation by David McDuff was published by Particular Books in 2014 and in paperback by Penguin Books in 2016. It was translated into Norwegian Bokmål by Morten Abildsnes and published by Heinesen in 2014. A Swedish translation by Hanna Lahdenperä was published by Norstedts in 2014. A Chinese translation by Ke Cui was published by CITIC of Beijing in 2024. A Japanese version by Takako Servo and Jun Igarashi was published in 2025 by Kawade Shobo Shinsha.

== See also ==
- Tove Jansson Life, Art, Words – biography by Boel Westin

== Sources ==
- Karjalainen, Tuula (2016) [2013]. Tove Jansson: Work and Love. Penguin Books. ISBN 978-0-141-97882-6.
