= Merete Mazzarella =

Finnish author and literature academic (born 1945)

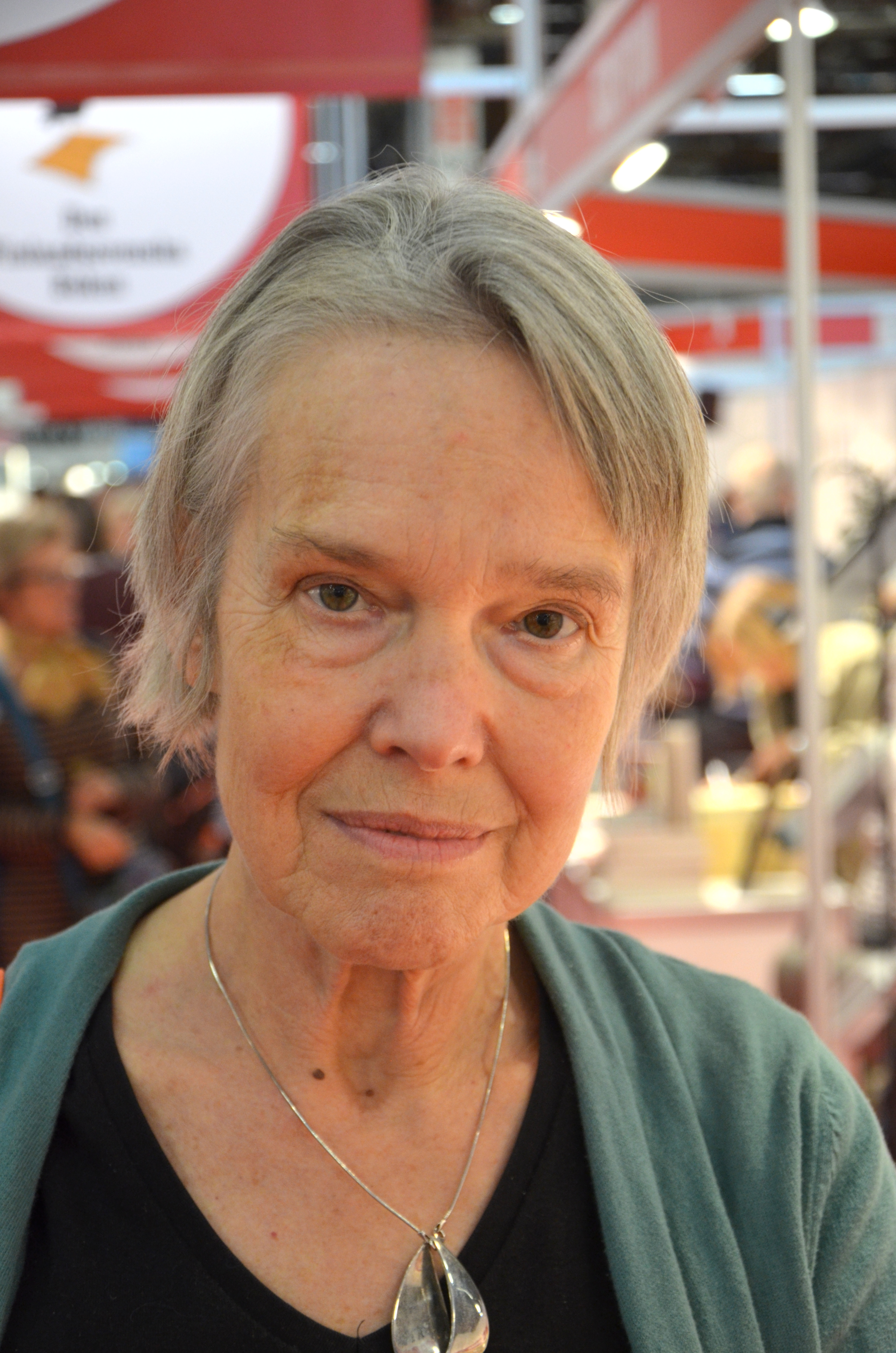
- In 2014
- Born: Signe Merete Schreck; February 4, 1945 (age 81); Helsinki, Finland
- Education: Svenska fruntimmersskolan; Helsinki University
- Occupations: Writer; researcher
- Spouses: Silvester Mazzarella (m. 1968; div. 1977); Lars Gustafsson; Lars Hertzberg (m. 2012)

Signe Merete Mazzarella (née Schreck; born February 4, 1945) is a Finland-Swedish prize-winning author and literature researcher.

== Early life ==
Mazzarella's mother was Danish, and her father was a Finnish ambassador. Her father's mother tongue was Finnish, but they spoke Swedish at home for practical reasons. Mazzarella learnt about Finland-Swedish culture through literature.

Mazzarella attended school at the Swedish-language school Svenska fruntimmersskolan in Helsinki and graduated in 1962. She graduated with a Bachelor of Arts degree in 1968 from the University of Helsinki and a Licentiate degree in 1977.

== Career ==
From 1973 to 1995, Mazzarella worked as a lecturer in Finland-Swedish literature at Helsinki University. She completed her doctorate degree in 1981, on the subject of Swedish Nobel laureate Eyvind Johnson. Mazzarella held a temporary professorship in Nordic literature at Helsinki University from 1995 to 1998 and was appointed as a permanent professor from 1998 to 2008. She is Professor Emerita of Nordic Literature at the University of Helsinki.

Mazzarella has written for Hufvudstadsbladet in Finland, as well as Sydsvenska dagbladet and Dagens Nyheter in Sweden. She has written 20 books, one of the more recent being Om livets mening ("On the Meaning of Life"), published by Schildts & Söderströms in 2017 and also available in Finnish translation.

== Personal life ==
Mazzarella was married to English lecturer Silvester Mazzarella from 1968 to 1977 and after that to literary historian Lars Gustafsson. Mazzarella married Lars Hertzberg, Professor Emeritus in philosophy at Åbo Akademi University, on 4 March 2012. They reside in Ekenäs (Swedish) / Tammisaari (Finnish), a town in the south of Finland.

== Bibliography ==
- Först sålde de pianot, 1979
- Myt och verklighet: Berättandets problem i Eyvind Johnsons roman Strändernas svall, 1981
- Att spela sitt liv, 1981
- Påsk, 1983
- Från Fredrika Runeberg till Märta Tikkanen: Frihet och beroende i finlandssvensk kvinnolitteratur , 1985
- Den okända sällskapsresenären, 1987
- Det trånga rummet: En finlandssvensk romantradition, 1989
- Samtal, 1990
- Hem från festen, 1992
- Agnes von Krusenstjerna, 1992
- Att skriva sin värld: Den finlandssvenska memoartraditionen, 1993
- Tanten och krokodilen, 1995
- Otrohetens lockelse: En bok om äktenskapet, 1997
- Där man aldrig är ensam: Om läsandets konst, 1999
- Då svänger sig sommaren kring sin axel: Om konsten att bli gammal, 2000
- Linjer mellan stjärnor: Essäer om identitet, 2002
- November: berättelser, 2004
- Den goda beröringen: Om kropp, hälsa, vård och litteratur, 2005
- Fredrika Charlotta född Tengström: En nationalskalds hustru, 2007
- När vi spelade Afrikas stjärna: En bok om barnbarn, 2008
- Ingen saknad, ingen sorg: En dag i Zacharias Topelius liv, 2009
- Resa med rabatt: Om konsten att vara pensionär, 2010
- Det enda som egentligen händer oss: Ett år i livet, 2012
- Att berätta sig själv: Inspirationsbok för den som vill skriva om sitt liv, 2013
- Själens nattsida: Om Mary Shelley och hennes Frankenstein, 2014
- Solens år Katten , 2015
- Om meningen med livet , 2017
- Alma , 2018
- Den försiktiga resenären, 2019
- Skulle vi alla kunna samsas? Essäer om vår samtid, 2020
- Från höst till höst, 2021
- Den violetta timmen, 2022
- Nånting på andra sidan, 2023
- Att lära sig falla. Om kärlek och andra känslor, 2024

== Awards ==
- 1986, 1990, Society of Swedish Literature in Finland-award
- 1994, the Swedish Assembly of Finland's merit medal
- 1995, Fredrika Runeberg-scholarship
- 2001, nominated for Fakta Finlandia with the book Då svänger sig sommaren kring sin axel
- 2003, Tollander-award
- 2005, Samfundet De Nio's literary prize
- 2007, Tegnér-award
- 2008, Finnish Science Book of the Year Award (Årets vetenskapsbok) for Fredrik Charlotta Född Tengström: en nationalskalds hustru about Fredrika Runeberg, the wife of J. L. Runeberg
- 2009, nominated for the Finlandia Prize for Ingen saknad, ingen sorg: en dag i Zacharias Topelius liv
- 2015, Mazzarella's Själens nattsida was nominated for the 2015 Runeberg Prize
- 2015, Stiftelsen Längmanska kulturfonden's Finland Prize for Finland-Swedish authors
- 2021, Mazzarella was awarded the Swedish Academy Finland Prize
