= Sort of Books =

British publishing house

- Founded: 1999; 26 years ago
- Founders: Mark Ellingham; Natania Jansz
- Country of origin: United Kingdom
- Headquarters location: London, England
- Distribution: Profile Books
- Key people: Mark Ellingham and Natania Jansz (editors); Peter Dyer (cover designer), Henry Iles (text designer)
- Publication types: Fiction and non-fiction
- Official website: sortof.co.uk

Sort of Books is an independent British publishing house started in 1999 by Mark Ellingham and Natania Jansz, founders of the Rough Guides travel series. The company publishes both original and classic fiction and non-fiction titles: "The sort of books [readers] will want to discover and re-discover."

== Background ==
The launch title of Sort of Books in 1999 was Driving Over Lemons: An Optimist in Andalucia, a memoir by Chris Stewart (original drummer of the band Genesis), which went on to sell more than a million copies. The company has "hand-picked three or four titles each year since", specializing in contemporary fiction, nonfiction, and popular science, among other categories.

Sort of Books is credited with having "spearheaded" a revival of interest in Tove Jansson, creator of the Moomins, by bringing out a range of books by and about her, from 2012 onwards. Other authors include Kathleen Jamie, Jonathan Buckley, Lore Segal, Simon Lewis, Sophie Hannah, Stefan Zweig, Alexander Baron, Robert Kunzig, Wallace Broecker, Jane Bowles and Paul Bowles. The company's website also notes: "[W]e are delighted to keep in print Peter Blegvad's unique Leviathan – a genre-defying comic strip collection of wordplay, puns and ideas. We love this book and owe Peter a debt, having called our company after the first record he made with his band, Slapp Happy."

In 2020, Sort of Books was named on a global list of "7 Publishing Presses Introducing New Talent", selected by Wiki.ezvid.com, where it was noted: "The big publishing houses may have all the resources and money, but they hardly have the last word when it comes to releasing great literature to the public; the smaller, independent presses are just as worthy, and often have even more unique and interesting catalogs of titles. The ones included here, operating around the world, are helping to bring compelling works from talented authors to market."

In 2022, a novel published by Sort of Books was for the first time chosen for the Booker Prize longlist: Sri Lankan writer Shehan Karunatilaka's The Seven Moons of Maali Almeida, described by Charlie Connelly in The New European as "part ghost story, part whodunnit, part political satire ... a wonderful book about Sri Lanka, friendship, grief and the afterlife". It was subsequently announced on the Booker shortlist, going on to win the prize, which was presented on 17 October 2022 at a ceremony held in The Roundhouse. Sort Of Books is by some way the smallest independent publisher to have a Booker prizewinner. The publishing company had earlier won the Aventis Science Book of the Year (now the Royal Society Science Books Prize), in 2001, with Robert Kunzig's Mapping the Deep: The Extraordinary Story of Ocean Science.
