= List of burials at Hietaniemi Cemetery =

Among those interred at the Hietaniemi Cemetery in Helsinki.

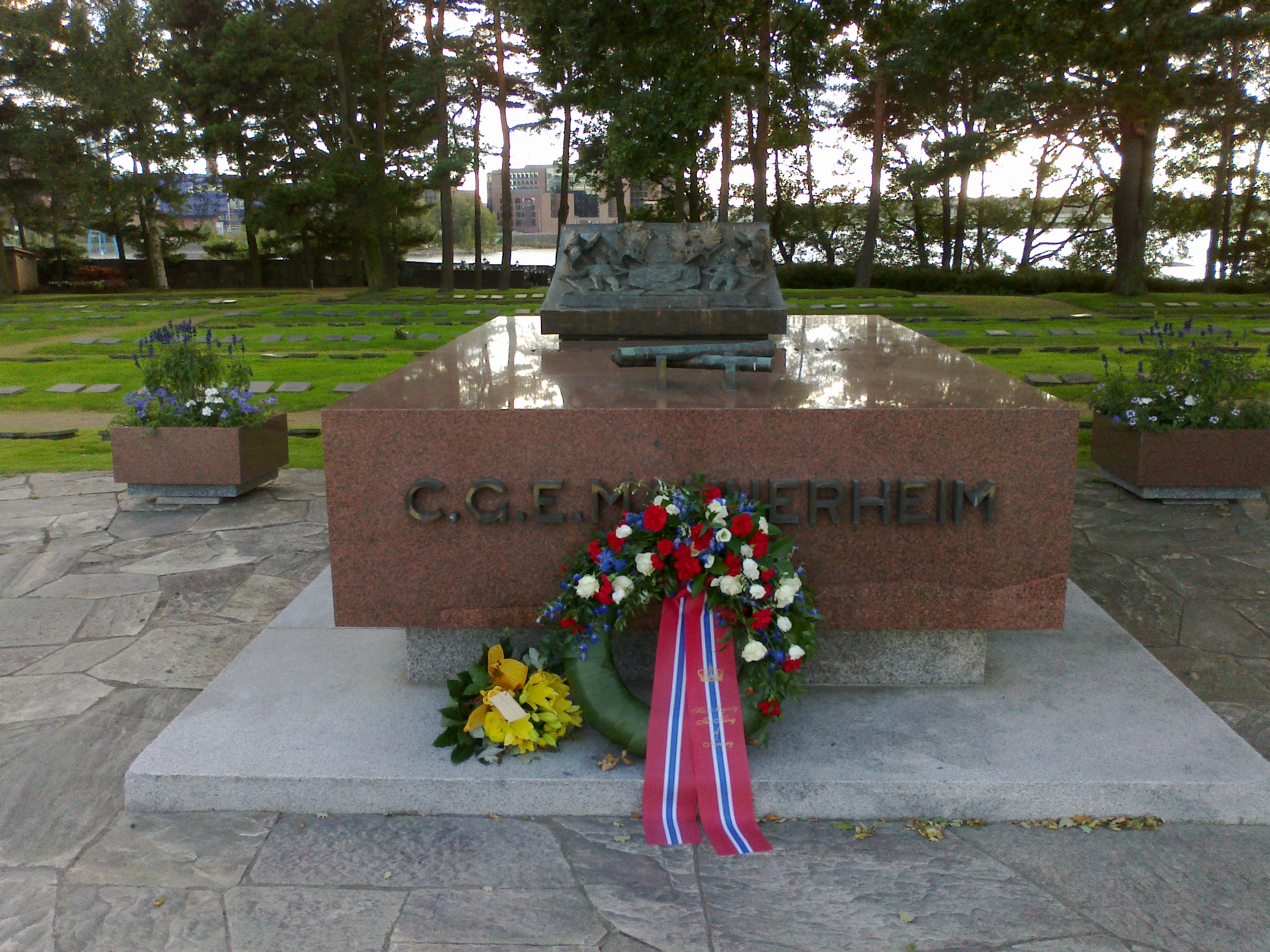
Grave of Mannerheim

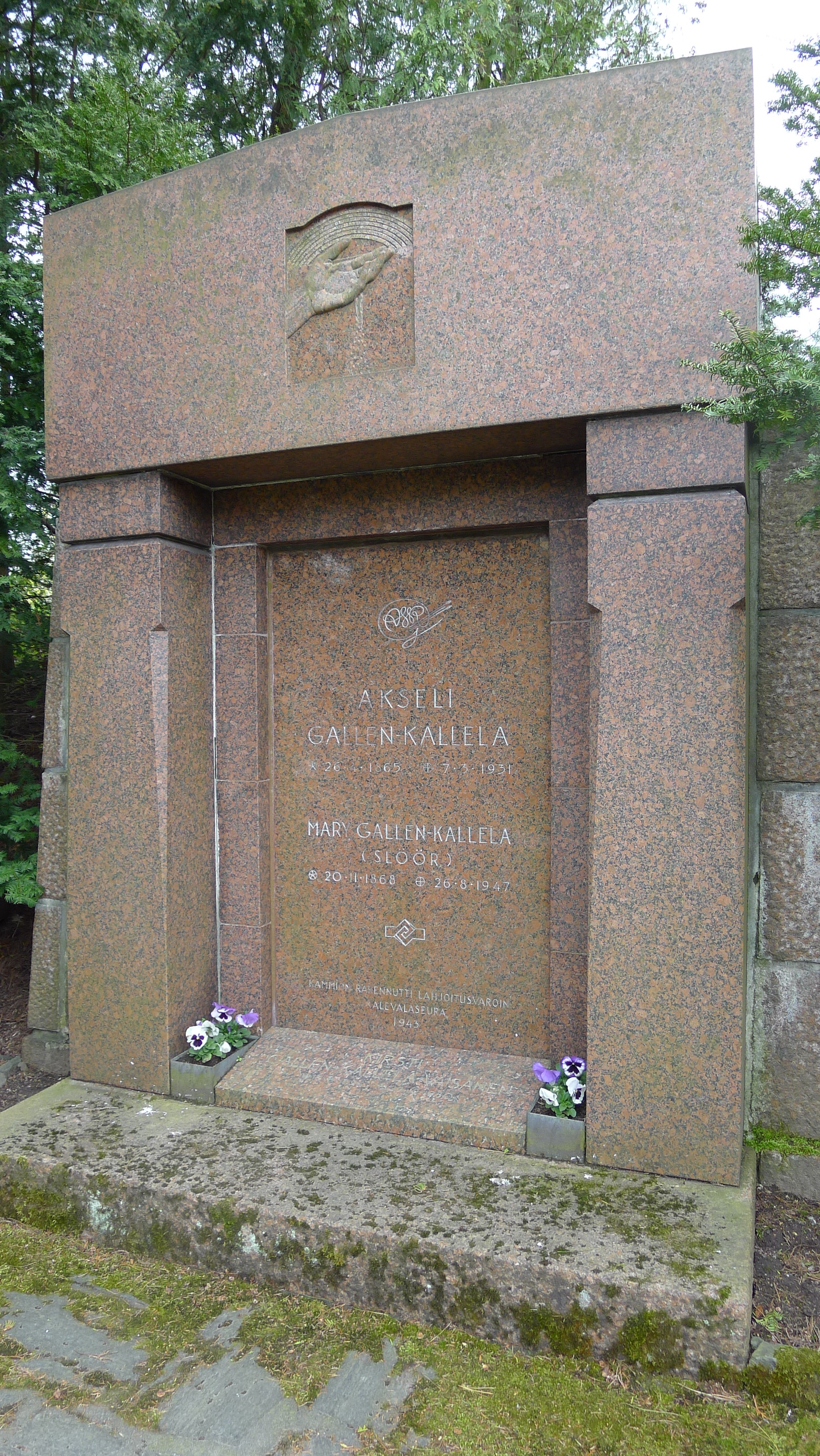
Grave of Akseli Gallen Kallela

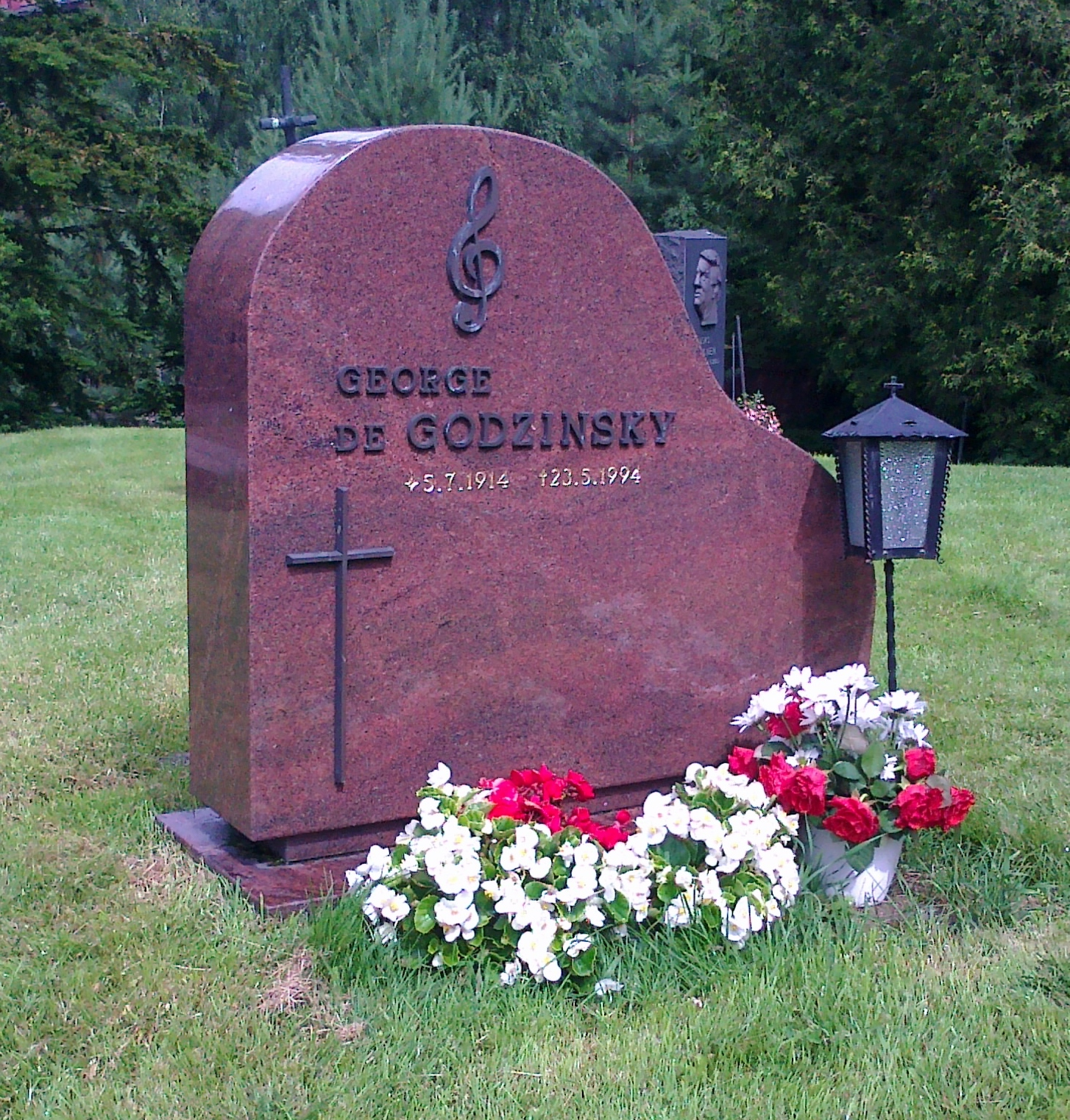
Grave of George de Godzinsky

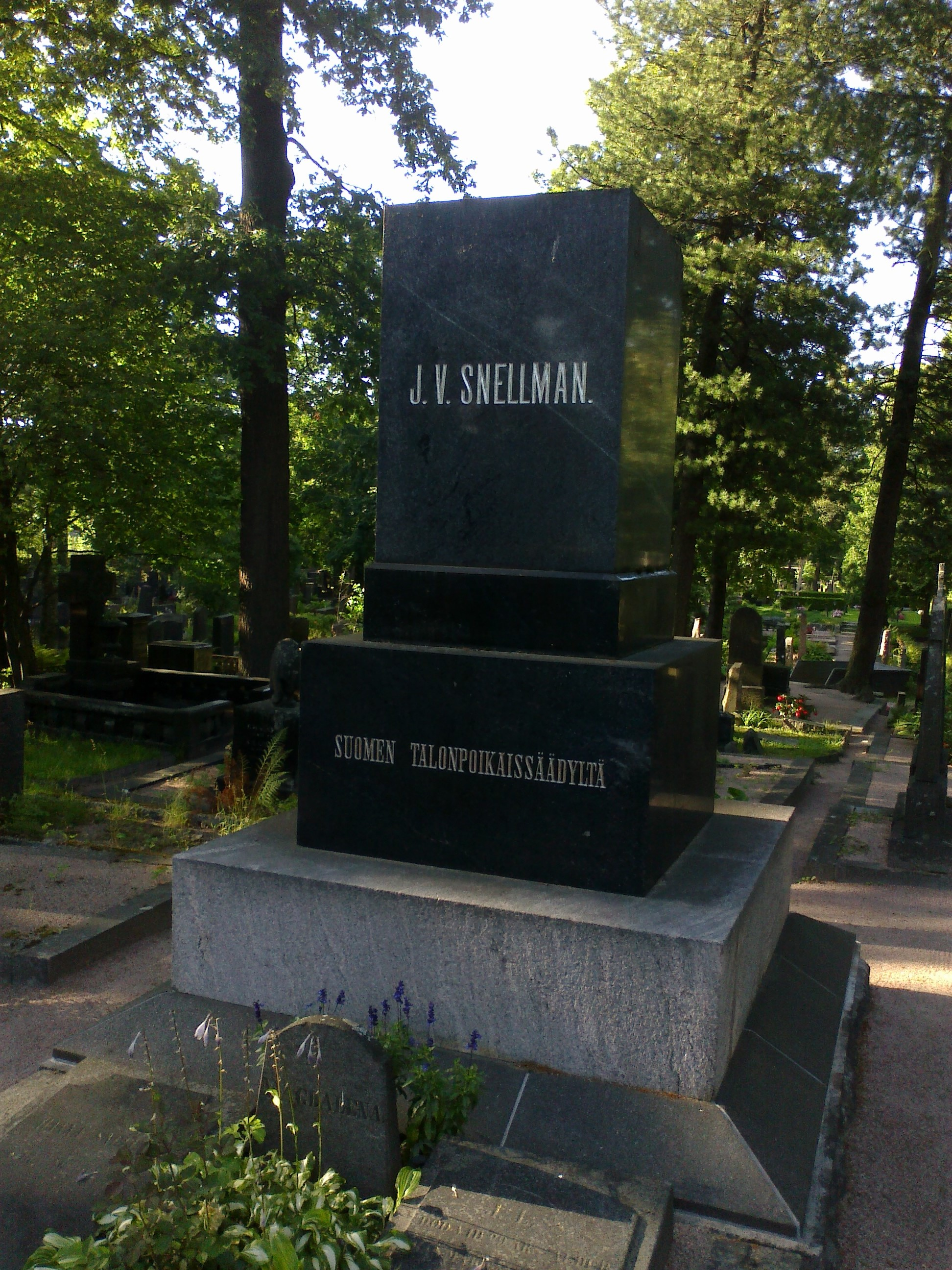
Grave of Johan Vilhelm Snellman

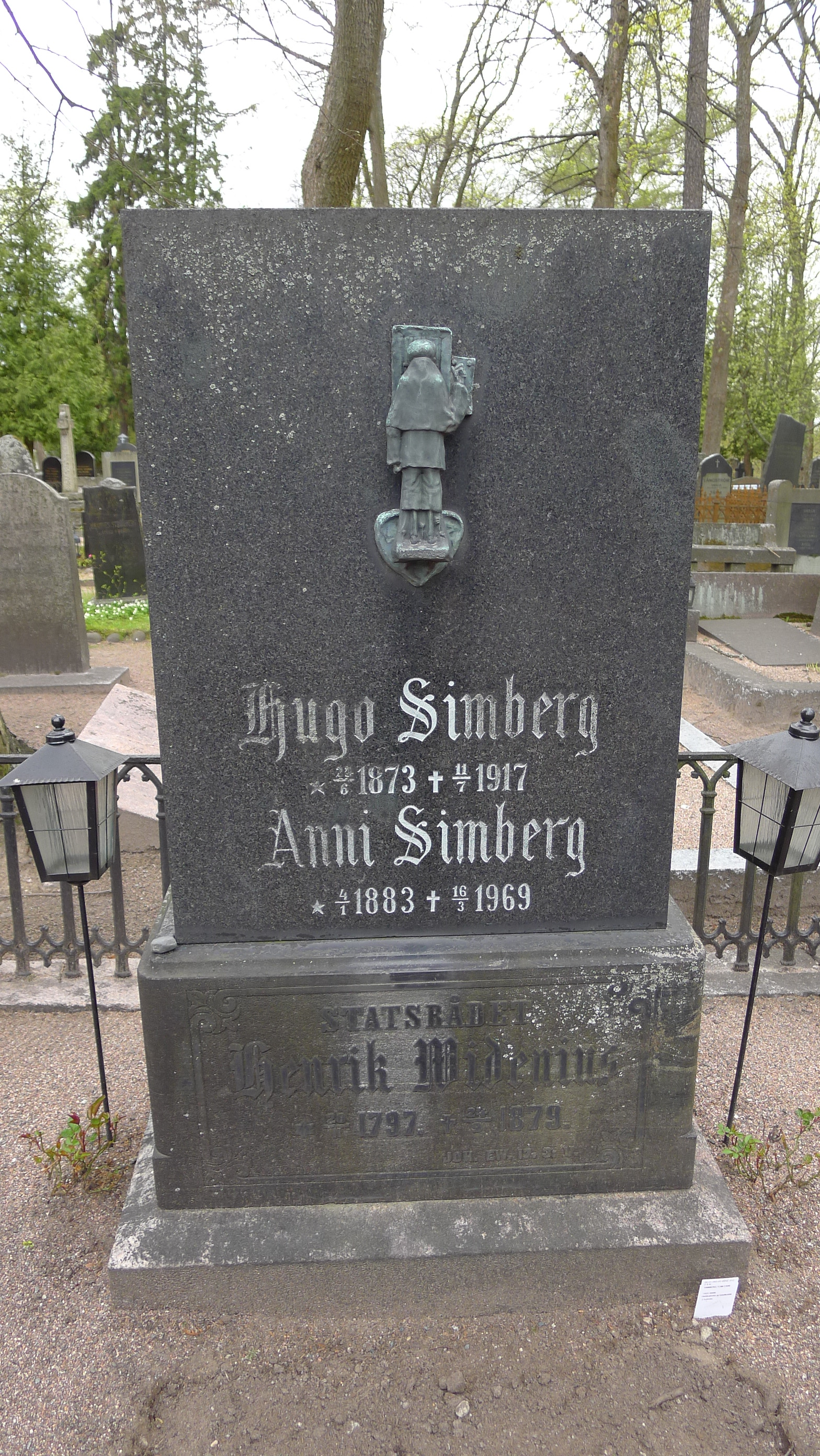
Grave of Hugo Simberg

== Artist's Hill ==
- Aino Aalto, architect
- Alvar Aalto, architect
- Elissa Aalto, architect
- Tapani Aartomaa, graphic artist
- Erik Bergman, composer
- Juhana Blomstedt, painter
- Rut Bryk, designer
- Walentin Chorell, author
- Ella Eronen, actor
- Mauri Favén, painter
- Akseli Gallen-Kallela, painter
- George de Godzinsky, conductor
- Maggie Gripenberg, dancer
- Walton Grönroos, opera singer
- Heimo Haitto, violinist
- Tauno Hannikainen, conductor
- Juhani Harri, sculptor
- Eva Hemming, dancer
- Eila Hiltunen, sculptor
- Martha Hirn, opera singer
- Carl Hirn, composer
- Tea Ista, actor
- Yrjö Jyrinkoski, reader
- Pentti Kaskipuro, designer
- Aimo Kanerva, painter
- Åke Lindman, film director and actor
- Paavo Liski, theater director
- Reko Lundán, playwright
- Tarmo Manni, actor
- Usko Meriläinen, composer
- Timo Mikkilä, pianist
- Onni Okkonen, art historian
- Selim Palmgren, composer
- Spede Pasanen, artist
- Otso Pietinen, photographer
- Lasse Pihlajamaa, accordionist
- Marjatta Pokela, singer
- Martti Pokela, singer
- Sakari Puurunen, theater director
- Essi Renvall, sculptor
- Paavo Rintala, author
- Olli-Matti Ronimus, poet
- Sylva Rossi, actor
- Timo Sarpaneva, designer
- Solveig von Schoultz, author
- J. S. Sirén, architect
- Minna Talvik-Palmgren, singer
- Aimo Tukiainen, sculptor
- Bruno Tuukkanen, painter
- Veikko Tyrväinen, opera singer
- Leif Wager, actor
- Mika Waltari, author
- Elina Vaara, poet
- Jorma Weneskoski, jazz musician
- Edward Vesala, jazz musician
- Usko Viitanen, opera singer
- Tapio Wirkkala, designer
- Heikki W. Virolainen, sculptor
- Jack Witikka, film director
- Eeva-Kaarina Volanen, actor

== Old part ==
- Ida Aalberg, actor
- August Ahlqvist, linguist
- Maria Andersson, supercentenarian
- Vivica Bandler, theater director
- Kaarlo Bergbom, theater director
- Henrik Borgström, politician
- A. K. Cajander, prime minister
- Paavo Cajander, poet
- Fredrik Cygnaeus, national awakener
- J. R. Danielson-Kalmari, historian
- Albert Edelfelt, painter
- Johan Albrecht Ehrenström, public planner
- Carl Ludvig Engel, architect
- Carl Enckell, diplomat
- Eero Erkko, newspaper publisher
- Eljas Erkko, newspaper publisher
- Pentti Fagerholm, radio reporter
- Erik von Frenckell, mayor
- Hannes Gebhard, co-operative leader
- Martti Haavio, academician
- Aale Tynni, poet
- Aaro Hellaakoski, poet
- Jyrki Hämäläinen, journalist
- Theodor Höijer, architect
- Viktor Jansson, sculptor
- Tove Jansson, painter, author and illustrator
- Risto Jarva, film supervisor
- Robert Kajanus, conductor
- Aino Kallas, author
- Siimes Kanervio, journalist, translator
- Aurora Karamzin, philanthropist
- Uuno Klami, composer
- Yrjö Sakari Yrjö-Koskinen, fennoman
- Pekka Kuusi, director general
- Aarre Lauha, bishop
- Curt Lincoln, race car driver
- Leevi Madetoja, composer
- Urho Muroma, revivalist movement leader
- L. Onerva, poet
- Sophie Mannerheim, nurse
- Leo Mechelin, statesman
- Edvard Engelbert Neovius, mathematician and topographer
- Frithiof Nevanlinna, mathematician
- Harri Nevanlinna, doctor
- Otto Nevanlinna, mathematician
- Rolf Nevanlinna, mathematician
- Saara Nevanlinna, philologist
- Johan Mauritz Nordenstam, senator
- Jyrki Otila, quiz show host
- Fredrik Pacius, composer
- Lauri Posti, professor
- Armas J. Pulla, author
- Anders Edward Ramsay, General
- Georg Edvard Ramsay, General
- Alpo Sailo, sculptor
- Helene Schjerfbeck, painter
- Hugo Simberg, painter
- J. V. Snellman, statesman
- Fabian Steinheil, General Governor
- Robert Stigell, sculptor
- Niilo Tarvajärvi, radio and TV journalist
- Erik Tawaststjerna, music critic
- Maria Hanna Kujanen, Psychiatrist
- Clas Thunberg, speed skater
- Herbert Tillander, goldsmith
- Zachris Topelius, author
- Ralf Törngren, politician
- Rudolf Walden, General
- Georg August Wallin, explorer
- Martin Wegelius, composer
- Voitto Viro, vicar
- Väinö Voionmaa, historian
- Magnus von Wright, painter
- Herbert Tillander, gemologist

== New part ==
- Heikki Aaltoila, composer
- Esa Adrian, translator
- Sinikka Arteva, TV journalist
- Anni Collan, educator
- Carl-Erik Creutz, radio announcer
- Uno Cygnaeus, pedagogue
- J. H. Erkko, poet
- Karl-August Fagerholm, prime minister
- Karl Fazer, manufacturer
- Eelis Gulin, bishop
- Ilmari Hannikainen, composer
- Jussi Himanka, correspondent
- Veikko Hursti, philanthropist
- Lauri Ingman, archbishop
- Tuure Junnila, politician
- Elmo Kaila, independence
- Inkeri Kajava, author
- Viljo Kajava, author
- Ahti Karjalainen, politician
- Sylvi Kekkonen, author
- Heikki Klemetti, choirmaster
- Rudolf Koivu, illustrator and painter
- Hannes Konno, composer
- Birgit Kronström, actor and singer
- Toivo Kuula, composer
- Toivo Kärki, composer
- Edvin Laine, film supervisor
- Hanna Lappalainen, pharmacist
- Eino Leino, poet
- Axel Lille, party leader
- Aarre Merikanto, composer
- Oskar Merikanto, composer
- Ukri Merikanto, sculptor
- Algot Niska, smuggler
- Kasimir Pennanen, actor
- Kaisu Puuska-Joki, radio announcer
- Markus Rautio, "Markus-setä"
- Joel Rinne, actor
- Eino Ripatti, Mannerheim Cross Knight
- Heikki Ritavuori, Minister of the Interior
- Walter Runeberg, sculptor
- Yrjö Ruutu, social influence
- Hannes Ryömä, politician
- Mauri Ryömä, politician
- Eetu Salin, labour movement leader
- Ville-Veikko Salminen, actor
- E. N. Setälä, professor
- Aarne Sihvo, General
- Martti Simojoki, archbishop
- Elvi Sinervo, poet
- Bobi Sivén, activist
- Emil Skog, politician
- Arto Sotavalta, popular song
- Einari Teräsvirta, architect, olympic winner
- Robert Tigerstedt, professor of physiology
- Esko Toivonen, artiste "Eemeli"
- Petri Walli, Kingston Wall-band singer-guitarist and songwriter
- Martti Välikangas, architect
- Kaapo Wirtanen, painter
- Pia Hattara, actor
- Pentti Irjala, actor
- Martti Katajisto, actor
- Kosti Klemelä, actor
- Aku Korhonen, actor
- Uuno Laakso, actor
- Kaisu Leppänen, actor
- Risto Mäkelä, actor
- Jalmari Rinne, actor
- Unto Salminen, actor
- Heikki Savolainen, actor
- Jussi Snellman, actor
- Ruth Snellman, actor
- Rauli Tuomi, actor
- Yrjö Tuominen, actor
- Kyllikki Väre, actor

== Hietaniemi area ==
- Siiri Angerkoski, actor
- Teuvo Aura, Mayor
- Kim Borg, opera singer
- Adolf Ehrnrooth, General
- Hilding Ekelund, architect
- Saulo Haarla, actor
- Antti Hackzell, governor
- Harri Holkeri, Councillor of state
- Eero Järnefelt, painter
- Uuno Kailas, poet
- Kyösti Karhila, aviator
- Erkki Karu, film supervisor and producer
- Juhani Kirpilä, doctor, collector of art
- Toivo Kivimäki, prime minister
- Kauko Käyhkö, singer, actor
- Risto Leskinen, attorney general
- Gunnar Lihr, commercial pilot
- Keijo Liinamaa, National conciliator
- Edwin Linkomies, Chancellor of the university
- Armand Lohikoski, film supervisor
- Lauri Malmberg, soldier
- Eugen Malmstén, composer and singer
- Georg Malmstén, composer and conductor
- Ragni Malmstén, singer
- Otto Manninen, poet
- Erkki Melartin, composer
- Anna Mutanen, opera singer
- Ernst Nevanlinna, professor
- Matti Paasivuori, trade unionist
- Simo Puupponen (Aapeli), author, columnist
- Jukka Rangell, prime minister
- Juha Rihtniemi, party leader
- Ilmari Salomies, archbishop
- Kaarlo Sarkia, poet
- Antti Satuli, ambassador
- Artur Sirk, Estonian freedom fighter
- Aili Somersalmi, actor
- Urho Somersalmi, actor
- Kalevi Sorsa, prime minister
- Anni Swan, author
- Toivo Särkkä, film producer and supervisor
- Väinö Tanner, party leader
- Alexander Tunzelman von Adlerflug, soldier
- Sakari Tuomioja, diplomat
- Maiju Lassila (aka Algot Untola), author
- Edvard Valpas-Hänninen, journalist
- Juho Vennola, prime minister
- Juha Virkkunen, journalist
- Paavo Virkkunen, politician
- A. I. Virtanen, nobelist
- Hella Wuolijoki, author
- Arvo Ylppö, archiater

== Presidents ==
- Urho Kekkonen
- Carl Gustaf Emil Mannerheim
- Juho Kusti Paasikivi
- Lauri Kristian Relander
- Risto Ryti
- K. J. Ståhlberg
- Mauno Koivisto
- Martti Ahtisaari

== Crematorium ==
- Eero Antikainen, trade unionist
- Pietari Autti, General, Mannerheim Cross Knight
- Paavo Berglund, conductor
- Jarl Fahler, parapsychology, hypnotist
- Nils-Eric Fougstedt, conductor
- Ilpo Hakasalo, radio music journalist
- Tony Halme, boxer
- Toini Havu, literary critic
- Heinz Hofmann, choirmaster
- Cisse Häkkinen, musician
- Anja Ignatius, violinist
- Bengt Johansson, composer
- Martti Jukola, radiojournalist
- Eino Jurkka, actor, supervisor, theater director
- Emmi Jurkka, actor, theater director
- Jussi Jurkka, actor
- Matti Jämsä, journalist
- Heino Kaski, composer
- Yrjö Kilpeläinen, journalist and columnist ("Jahvetti")
- Esko Kivikoski, quiz master
- Juhani Kumpulainen actor, supervisor
- Arvo Kuusla actor
- Irja Kuusla actor
- Esko Linnavalli, musician
- Erkki Melakoski, composer, musicjournalist
- Nils Mustelin, professor
- Eero Mäkelä, chef
- Juhani Mäkelä, journalist, author
- Masa Niemi, actor
- Valo Nihtilä, colonel
- Esko Nikkilä, Internal Medicine professor
- Assi Nortia, actor
- Jorma Nortimo, film supervisor
- Jorma Ojaharju, author
- Olavi Paavolainen, author
- Sauvo Puhtila, "Saukki ja Pikkuoravat"
- L. A. Puntila, historian, politician
- Väinö Purje, chef
- Matti Ranin, actor, Theatre Counsellor
- Saara Ranin, actor
- Sulho Ranta, composer
- Leo Riuttu, actor
- Aarno Ruusuvuori, architect
- Orvo Saarikivi, film supervisor
- Tauno Sarantola, dean
- Arto Satukangas, pianist
- Jukka Sipilä, actor, supervisor
- Harri Sirola, author
- Teija Sopanen, TV announcer
- Teppo J. Suonperä, colonel, quiz master
- Penna Tervo, minister
- Raimo Utriainen, sculptor
- Juha Vainio, singer and songwriter
- Sulo Wuolijoki, politician, author
- Kalle Österlund, doctor
- Hertta Kuusinen, minister
- Aira Samulin, dance teacher, businesswoman

== Cemetery of the Finnish Guard ==
- Aleksei Apostol, conductor
- Holger Fransman, professor, horn artist
- Adolf Leander, conductor
- Lenni Linnala, conductor
- Armas-Eino Martola, General, The Mannerheim Cross Knight
- Martti Parantainen, conductor
- Albert Puroma, General, The Mannerheim Cross Knight
- Artturi Rope, conductor
- Wäinö Sola, oopperasinger
- Ville-Poju Somerkari, General
- Mika Tiivola, banker
- Arvi Kalsta, General, politician
- Väinö Valve, General
