= Hietaniemi Cemetery =

Cemetery in Helsinki, Finland

Hietaniemi cemetery
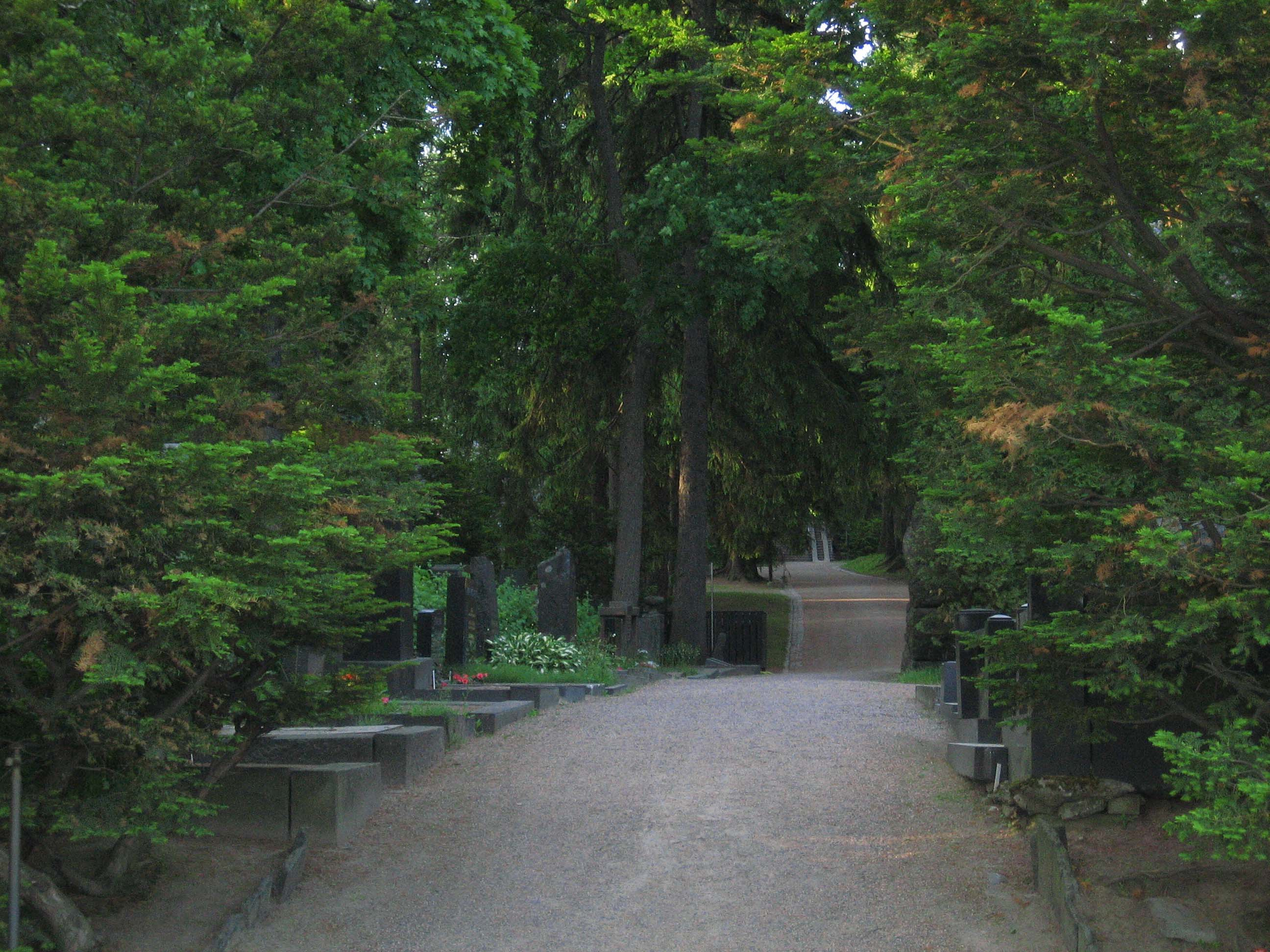
- Hietaniemi cemetery
- Interactive map of Hietaniemi cemetery

Details
- Established: 1829
- Location: Lapinlahti, Helsinki
- Country: Finland
- Coordinates: 60°10′10″N 024°55′04″E
- Type: Public
- Owned by: Federation of Evangelical Lutheran Parishes in Helsinki
- Website: helsinginseurakunnat.fi

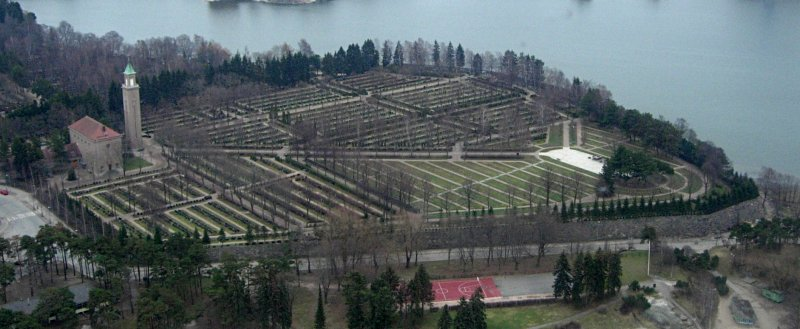
An aerial photograph of the section in the cemetery where soldiers killed in the Second World War are buried

The Hietaniemi cemetery (Finnish: Hietaniemen hautausmaa, Swedish: Sandudds begravningsplats) is located mainly in the Lapinlahti quarter and partly in the Etu-Töölö district of Helsinki, the capital of Finland. It is the location for Finnish state funeral services and is owned by the Evangelical Lutheran Church of Finland.

Established in 1829, the cemetery includes a large military cemetery section for soldiers from the capital fallen in the wars against the Soviet Union and Nazi Germany: in the Winter War (1939–1940), the Continuation War (1941–1944) and the Lapland War (1944–1945). In the centre of the military cemetery are the tombs of the unknown soldier and Marshal C. G. E. Mannerheim, commander-in-chief of the Finnish Defence Forces during World War II, and the sixth president of Finland (1944–1946). Other notable sections of the cemetery are the cemetery of the Finnish Guard, the Artist's Hill and the Statesmen's Grove. There are two Lutheran funerary chapels and a crematorium at the area.

Hietaniemi means "sand cape" and is a headland located centrally in Helsinki.

== Description ==
The cemetery is partly located at a promontory, and partly directly adjacent to the Hietaniemi Beach.

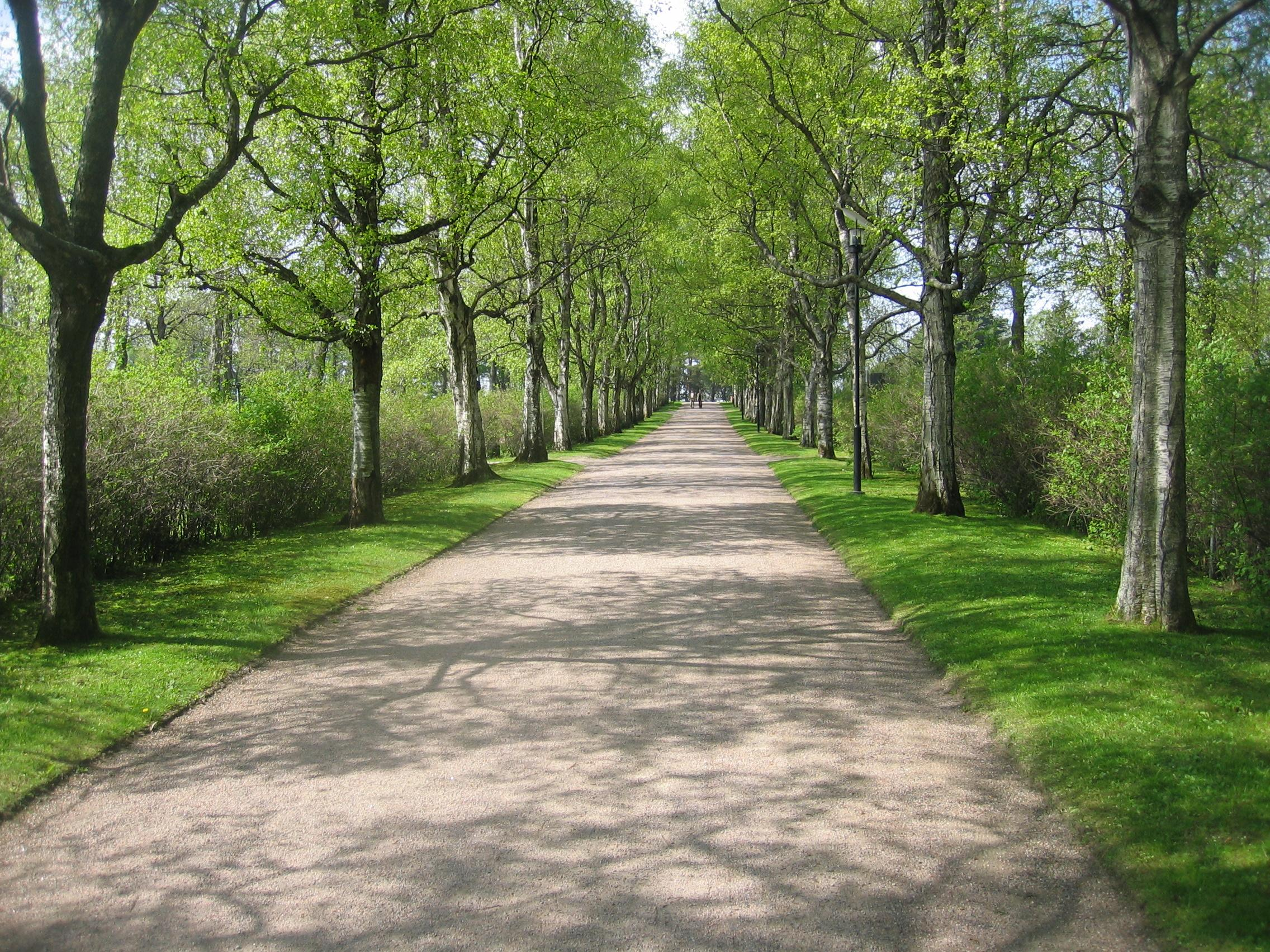

The cemetery is a popular tourist attraction, especially amongst Finns visiting the graves of relatives fallen in wars or the graves of the many famous Finns buried there since the 1820s.

Four other cemeteries are also located at the greater cemetery district of Hietaniemi: the Helsinki Jewish cemetery, the Helsinki Islamic cemetery, the Helsinki Orthodox cemetery and the cemetery of the St. Nicholas Orthodox Parish.

In the 2010s, it was confirmed that an extensive catacomb network was located beneath the Orthodox cemetery.

== Notable interments ==
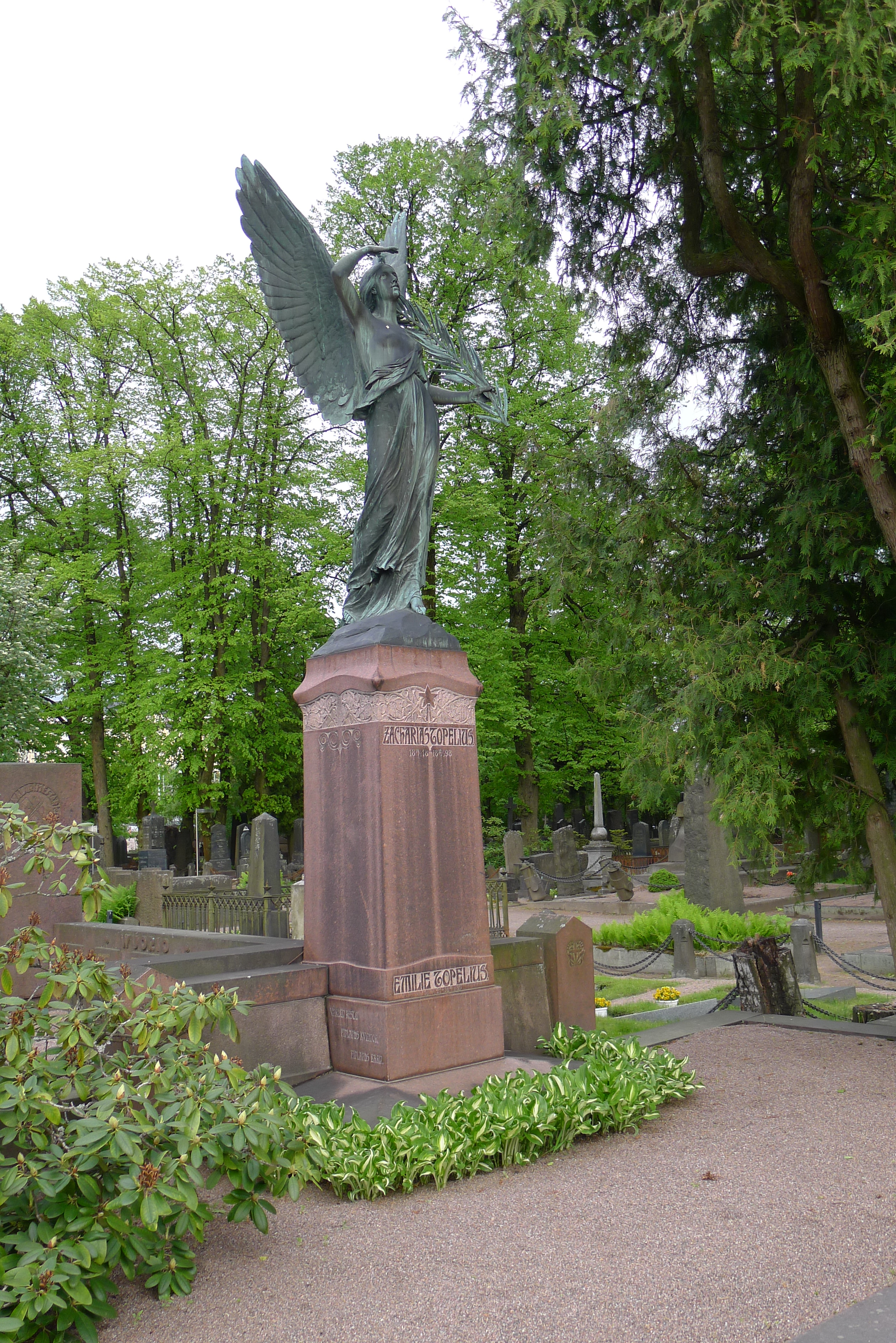
Grave of Zacharias Topelius

- Aino Aalto (January 25, 1894 – January 13, 1949) – Architect and pioneer of Scandinavian design
- Alvar Aalto (February 3, 1898 – May 11, 1976) – Architect and designer
- Elissa Aalto (November 22, 1922 – April 12, 1994) – Architect
- Tapani Aartomaa (May 7, 1934 – October 27, 2009) – Graphic designer and artist, and lecturer at the Institute of Design in Helsinki and Lahti Institute of Design
- Martti Ahtisaari (June 23, 1937 – October 16, 2023) – 10th President of the Republic of Finland, politician, ambassador, diplomat, and 2008 Nobel Peace Prize recipient
- Paavo Berglund (April 14, 1929 – January 25, 2012) – Conductor and violinist
- Erik Bergman (November 24, 1911 – April 24, 2006) – Composer of classical music
- Juhana Blomstedt (December 20, 1937 – August 3, 2010) – Abstract artist
- Rut Bryk (October 18, 1916 – November 14, 1999) – Designer, ceramist, printmaker, and textilist
- Paavo Cajander (December 24, 1846 – June 14, 1913) – Poet and translator
- Walentin Chorell (April 8, 1912 – November 18, 1983) – Author and actor
- Adolf Ehrnrooth (February 9, 1905 – February 26, 2004) – General and 1948 Summer Olympian
- Carl Ludvig Engel (July 3, 1778 – May 4, 1840, Helsinki) – Architect
- Ella Eronen (January 29, 1900 – October 9, 1987) – Renowned actor and poetic reciter
- Verna Erikson (April 11, 1893 – October 16, 1918) – Icon of White Finland
- Mauri Favén (August 26, 1920 – February 23, 2006) – Painter
- Erik von Frenckell (November 18, 1887 – September 13, 1977) – Nobleman, member of the Parliament of Finland, member of the International Olympic Committee and a vice president of the International Football Association FIFA
- Akseli Gallen – Kallela (April 16, 1865 – March 7, 1931) – Painter and illustrator of the Kalevala, the Finnish national epic
- George de Godzinsky (July 5, 1914 – May 23, 1994) – Composter, pianist, and conductor
- Maggie Gripenberg (June 11, 1881 – July 28, 1976) – Pioneer of modern dance in Finland
- Walton Grönroos (August 29, 1939 – March 19, 1999) – Baritone opera singer, oratorio, and Lieder singer
- Heimo Haitto (May 22, 1925 – June 9, 1999) – Classical violinist
- Tony Halme (January 6, 1963 – January 8, 2010) – Politician, athlete, author, actor, and singer
- Eemil Halonen (May 21, 1875 – November 5, 1950) – Sculptor
- Tauno Hannikainen (February 26, 1896 – October 12, 1968) – Cellist and conductor
- Juhani Harri (February 27, 1939 – June 18, 2003) – Postwar and contemporary artist
- Eva Hemming (January 12, 1923 – January 15, 2007) – Prima ballerina, dancer, actress, and author
- Eila Hiltunen (November 22, 1922 – November 10, 2003) – Sculptor, including the Sibelius Monument
- Carl Hirn (November 21, 1886 – February 16, 1949) – Composer and music journalist
- Martha Hirn – Opera singer
- Harri Holkeri (January 6, 1937 – August 7, 2011) – Statesman, Prime Minister of Finland, and President of the UN General Assembly
- I. K. Inha (November 12, 1865 – April 3, 1930) – Photographer, author, journalist, and translator
- Tea Ista (December 12, 1932 – February 20, 2014) – Actor
- Tove Jansson (August 9, 1914 – June 27, 2001) – Creator of the Moomins, author, novelist, painter, and illustrator
- Viktor Jansson (1886, Helsinki – 1958) – Sculptor
- Yrjö Jyrinkoski (May 17, 1920 – March 7, 1981) – Voice artist and interpreter
- Kalervo Kallio (March 28, 1909 – November 2, 1969) – Sculptor
- Aimo Kanerva (January 19, 1909 – December 16, 1991) – Renowned artist
- Pentti Kaskipuro (October 10, 1930 – September 4, 2010) – Graphic artist
- Urho Kekkonen (September 3, 1900 – August 31, 1986) – 8th President of the Republic of Finland, prime minister, and cabinet member
- Lauri Kettunen (September 10, 1885 – February 26, 1963) – Linguist and professor at the University of Tartu and University of Helsinki
- Mauno Koivisto (November 25, 1923 – May 12, 2017) – 9th President of the Republic of Finland and prime minister
- Toivo Kuula (July 7, 1883 – May 18, 1918) – Composer and conductor
- Lorenz Leonard Lindelöf (November 13, 1827 – March 3, 1908) – Mathematician, astronomer, and politician
- Åke Lindman (January 11, 1928 – March 3, 2009) – Director and actor
- Paavo Liski (July 4, 1939 – November 8, 2005) – Actor, theater director, and artistic director
- Reko Lundán (April 2, 1969 – October 27, 2006) – Television presenter, writer, screenwriter, novelist, and journalist
- Leevi Madetoja (17 February 1887 – 6 October 1947) – Composer, conductor, music teacher, and music critic
- Gustaf Magnusson (December 8, 1902 – December 27, 1993) – Major general, fighter ace, and Mannerheim Cross Knight
- Carl Gustaf Emil Mannerheim (June 4, 1867 – January 27, 1951) – 6th President of the Republic of Finland, military commander, and statesman
- Tarmo Manni (July 30, 1921 – September 24, 1999) – Actor
- Aarre Merikanto (June 29, 1893 – September 28, 1958) – Composer
- Oskar Merikanto (August 5, 1868 – February 17, 1924) – Composer, pianist, organist, and music critic
- Ukri Merikanto (March 30, 1950 – July 25, 2010) – Sculptor
- Usko Meriläinen (January 17, 1930 – November 12, 2004) – Composer
- Timo Mikkilä (October 16, 1912 – January 18, 2006) – Pianist and recipient of the Order of the Lion of Finland
- Usko Nyström (September 8, 1861 – January 6, 1925) – Architect and Professor of architecture at the Helsinki University of Technology
- Karl Lennart Oesch (August 8, 1892 – March 28, 1978) – Leading general during World War II
- Onni Okkonen (August 20, 1886 – May 18, 1962) – Art historian
- Juho Kusti Paasikivi (November 27, 1870 – December 14, 1956) – 7th President of the Republic of Finland, senator, member of Finnish parliament, envoy to Stockholm and Moscow, and Prime Minister of Finland
- Aladár Paasonen (December 11, 1898 – July 6, 1974) – Military officer who served as the Chief of Intelligence for the Finnish Defence Forces and served in the CIA
- Fredrik Pacius (March 19, 1809 – January 8, 1901) – Composer and conductor
- Selim Palmgren (February 16, 1878 – December 13, 1951) – Composer, pianist, and conductor
- Spede Pasanen (April 10, 1930 – September 7, 2001) – Film director, producer, comedian, and inventor
- Otso Pietinen (September 19, 1916 – September 25, 1993) – Industrial and advertising photographer
- Lasse Pihlajamaa (August 1, 1916 – November 14, 2007) – Accordionist
- Marjatta Pokela (January 5, 1925 – April 13, 2002) – Composer, singer, and musician
- Martti Pokela (January 23, 1924 – August 23, 2007) – Composer and folk musician
- Sakari Puurunen (July 25, 1921 – August 5, 2000) – Theater and opera director
- Lauri Kristian Relander (May 31, 1883 – February 9, 1942) – 2nd President of the Republic of Finland
- Essi Renvall (October 3, 1911 – October 18, 1979) – Sculptor
- Paavo Rintala (September 20, 1930 – August 8, 1999) – Novelist, poet, writer, and theologian
- Olli – Matti Ronimus (July 1, 1929 – July 7, 2005) – Poet and writer
- Sylva Rossi (October 23, 1908 – November 9, 1992) – Actor
- Janis Rozentāls (March 18, 1866 – December 26, 1916) – Latvian painter
- Risto Ryti (February 3, 1889 – October 25, 1956) – 5th President of the Republic of Finland
- Aira Samulin (February 27, 1927 – October 23, 2023) – Founder of the Rytmikkäät Mannekiinit fashion dance school, politician, and actress
- Timo Sarpaneva (October 31, 1926 – October 6, 2006) – Designer, sculptor, and educator
- Michael Schilkin (May 1, 1900 – May 3, 1962) – Ceramist
- Solveig von Schoultz (August 5, 1907 – December 3, 1996) – Writer and teacher
- J. S. Sirén (May 27, 1889 – March 5, 1961) – Architect
- Artur Sirk (September 25, 1900 – August 2, 1937) – Estonian political and military figure
- Kaarlo Juho Ståhlberg (January 28, 1865 – September 22, 1952) – 1st President of the Republic of Finland, jurist, and academic
- Minna Talvik – Palmgren (February 28, 1902 – September 13, 1983) – Singer
- Väinö Tanner (March 12, 1881 – April 19, 1966), 10th Prime minister of the Republic of Finland
- Henry Theel (November 14, 1917 – December 19, 1989) – Singer and actor
- Zacharias Topelius (January 14, 1818 – March 12, 1898) – Author, poet, journalist, historian, and rector of the University of Helsinki
- Aimo Tukiainen (October 6, 1917 – June 3, 1996) – Sculptor
- Bruno Tuukkanen (November 11, 1891 – February 25, 1979) – Artist and recipient of the Order of the Lion of Finland
- Veikko Tyrväinen (May 16, 1922 – June 11, 1986) – Renowned tenor opera singer and soloist at the Finnish National Opera and Ballet
- Elina Vaara (May 29, 1903 – December 26, 1980) – Poet, writer, and translator
- Anita Välkki (October 25, 1926 – April 27, 2011) – Dramatic soprano
- Edward Vesala (February 15, 1945 – December 4, 1999) – Avant – garde jazz drummer
- Usko Viitanen (February 23, 1928 – June 6, 3005) – Baritone opera singer
- Heikki W. Virolainen (April 17, 1936 – July 16, 2004) – Sculptor
- Eeva – Kaarina Volanen (January 15, 1921 – January 29, 1999) – Actor
- Anna Vyrubova (July 16, 1884 – July 20, 1964) – Lady – in – waiting in the Russian Empire, best friend and confidante of Empress Alexandra Fyodorovna
- Leif Wager (February 11, 1922 – March 23, 2002) – Actor
- Petri Walli (February 25, 1969 – June 28, 1995) – Founder, vocalist, guitar – player, songwriter and producer of the Finnish psychedelic rock – band Kingston Wall
- Georg August Wallin (October 24, 1811 – October 23, 1852) – Orientalist, explorer, and professor
- Mika Waltari (September 19, 1908 – August 26, 1979) – Writer
- Jorma Weneskoski (October 15, 1929 – August 15, 2006) – Jazz musician and music promoter
- Tapio Wirkkala (June 2, 1915 – May 19, 1985) – Renowned graphic designer, designer, and sculptor, and 1955 recipient of the Order of the Lion of Finland
- Jack Witikka (December 20, 1916 – January 28, 2002) – Film director and screenwriter

== See also ==
- Malmi Cemetery
- List of burials at Hietaniemi Cemetery
- List of national cemeteries
