= Kajava =

Kajava is a Finnish surname. Notable people with the surname include:

- Jukka Kajava (1943–2005), Finnish theater and television critic
- Viljo Kajava (1909–1998), Finnish poet and writer
