= Verna Erikson =

Finnish weapon smuggler (1893–1918)

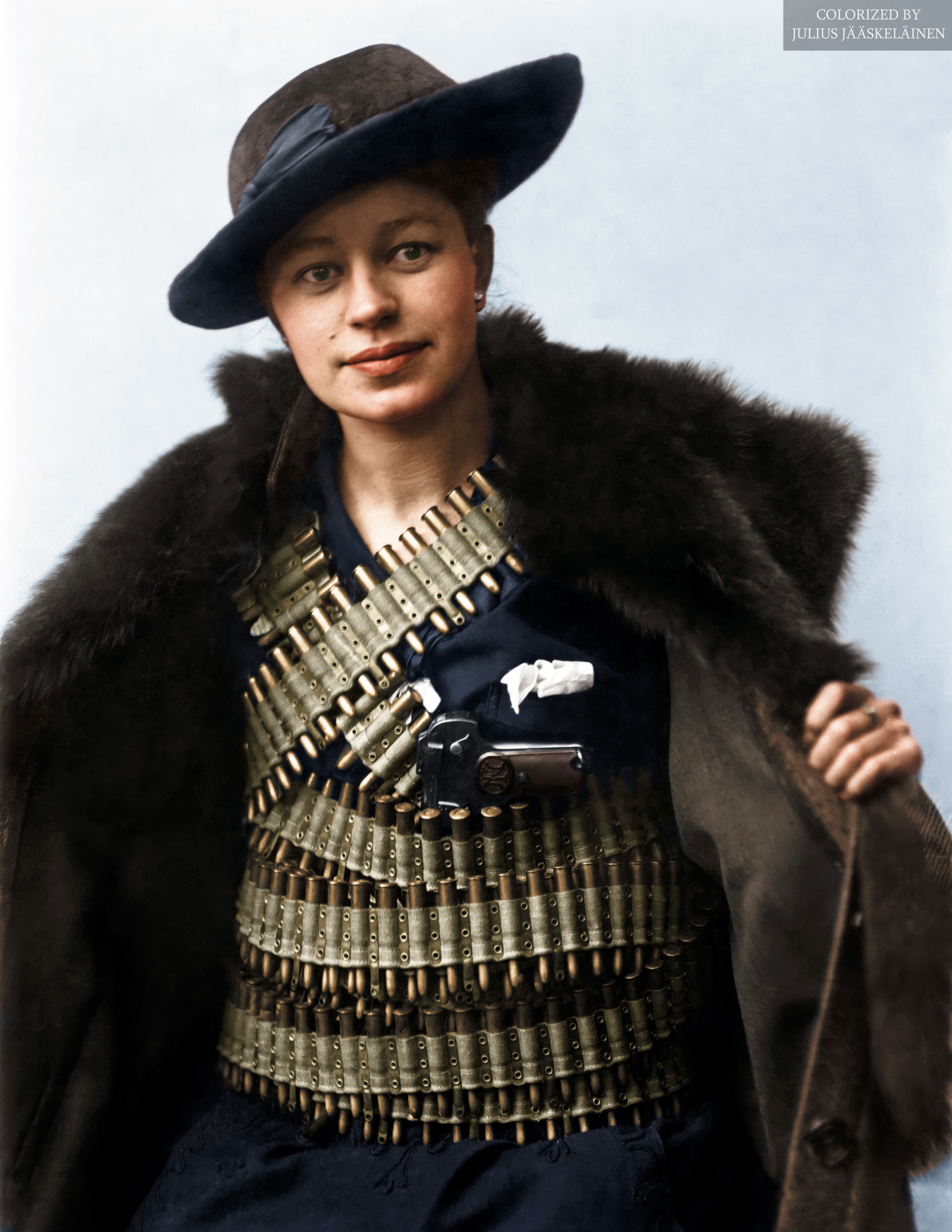
Verna Erikson, smuggler for the Helsinki White Guard, with hidden ammunition and pistol, in the spring of 1918, in the middle of the Finnish Civil War. Colorization by Julius Jääskeläinen.

Verna Erikson (11 April 1893 – 16 October 1918) was a Finnish woman whose picture, taken when she was a weapon smuggler (shown on the right) was an icon of White Finland. This picture was taken in the spring of 1918, during the Finnish Civil War, when Erikson was a student at the Helsinki University of Technology. It was published on the cover of the weekly magazine Suomen Kuvalehti on June 15, 1918. The caption to the image declared, "One of the finest protectresses of the Helsinki White Guard. Miss E., a student at the University of Technology, bearing three bandoliers and a large pistol. Altogether Miss E. is carrying some 1,350 bullets strapped to her person."

Erikson was given the Order of the Cross of Liberty in 1918, as was her schoolmate, a girl called Salme Setälä; the Cross itself had been founded that year on the initiative of General Carl Gustaf Emil Mannerheim.

Erikson died of cancer in 1918. She did not have time to go to the doctor when she first began feeling pain under her arms, and by the time she went she had a very advanced sarcoma. She is buried in Hietaniemi Cemetery in Finland.

The Finnish Civil War ended in 1918 with the White victory over the Reds, aided by the Germans.
