= Ella Eronen =

Finnish actress (1900–1987)

Professori Ella Eronen
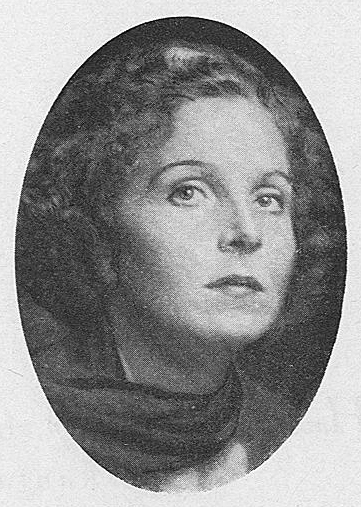
- Ella Eronen in the early 1930s
- Born: Ella Siviä Eronen; 29 January 1900; Helsinki, Grand Duchy of Finland
- Died: 9 October 1987 (aged 87); Helsinki, Finland
- Resting place: Hietaniemi Cemetery
- Spouses: Per Andersson (m. 1919; died 1924) Carl Wilhelms (m. 1928; div. 1935) Eino Olavi Tarkkonen (m. 1937; div. 1961)
- Awards: Pro Finlandia (1952); Ida Aalberg Prize (1977)

Ella Eronen (29 January 1900 — 9 October 1987) was a Finnish actress, poetic reciter, and one of the country's leading actresses in the 1930s to 1950s. She was called Diiva ('The Diva'), La Ella, and Ella Suuri ('Ella the Great'). Finnish theatre and film critic Jukka Kajava called her "possibly Finland's most legendary theatre actor".

== Early life and education ==
Ella Siviä Eronen was born in Helsinki to Finnish police detective August Eronen and Swedish Amanda née Ahlgren, as one of the couple's five children and the eldest of three daughters in a bilingual family.

She learned acting at the Swedish Theatre in Helsinki in 1915, in the dance corps, but was largely self-learned. Her interest in acting and dance was encouraged by her mother, while her father was against it; her mother's death in 1916 put paid to her aspirations, until she later moved to Stockholm to continue her studies at the drama school of Sweden's royal national theatre 'Dramaten'. In addition to acting and dance, Eronen also received tuition in singing.

== Career ==
=== Stage work (selected) ===
Eronen's stage debut came already at the age of six, when she performed the role of the young Mats in Strindberg's Kronbruden at the Swedish Theatre. A few years later she made her dance debut at the Finnish National Theatre in the ballet Les Sylphides.

Eronen was attached to several leading theatre companies during her career, including the Swedish Theatres of Helsinki and Turku, as well as the National Theatre for over two decades. Although her repertoire was wide and varied, she remains particularly remembered as a tragedienne; of the over 300 roles she played, some of the more notable ones included:

- Lady Macbeth in Macbeth — Åbo Svenska Teater (1936); reprised at the National Theatre (1938, 1964)
- Cleopatra in Antony and Cleopatra — National Theatre (1944)
- Alice in The Dance of Death — National Theatre (1947)
- Blanche du Bois in A Streetcar Named Desire — National Theatre (1950)
- Lavinia in Mourning Becomes Electra — Tampere Theatre (1952)
- Phèdre in Phèdre — National Theatre (1959)

=== Recitals ===
Outside of the world of theatre, Eronen performed many poetry recitals, in particular works of Eino Leino and excerpts from the Finnish national epic, Kalevala.

In February 1940, as Finland was in the midst of the Winter War against the Soviet Union, she notably recited the lyrics of the Finnish national anthem, Maamme (Swedish: Vårt land), in both Swedish and Finnish at the Stockholm Olympic Stadium, which helped to raise funds and support for Finland's war effort among the Swedish population, rally Finland's morale, as well as giving a significant boost to Eronen's own reputation. (A 1957 recording of her recital is available online.) The recital was broadcast on public radio in both Sweden and Finland, and as a result Eronen became popularly known as the 'Voice of Finland'.

=== Filmography ===
Eronen appeared in the films:

- Jääkärin morsian (1931) — Sonja Strand
- Pikku myyjätär (1933) — a customer
- Herrat täysihoidossa (1933) — Varpu Kyyhkynen
- Elinan surma (1938) — Kirsti Fleming
- Laitakaupungin laulu (1948) — Juudit, pub landlady

== Award and honours ==
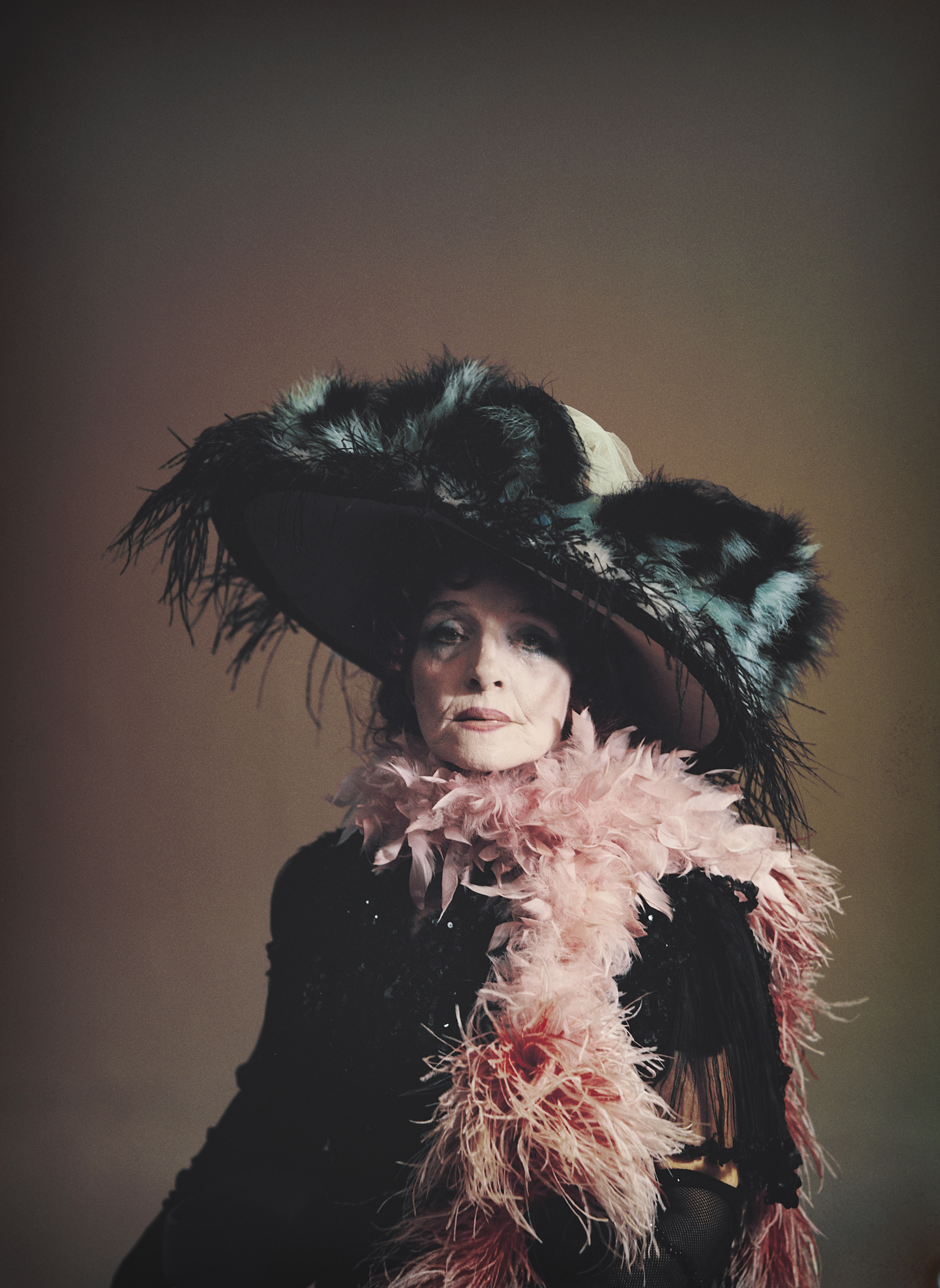
Eronen in 1971

In 1952, Eronen received the Pro Finlandia medal of the Order of the Lion of Finland, and in 1977, Finland's premier theatre award, the Ida Aalberg Prize.

In 1977, the honorary title of Professori was conferred on Eronen.

== Personal life ==
Eronen was married three times: first to Swedish actor Per Eugen Andersson (1919–24), then to sculptor Carl Wilhelms (né Karl Svensson; 1928–35), and finally to portrait painter Eino Olavi Tarkkonen (1937–61); the first, unhappy marriage ended in the death of her husband from alcoholism, the latter two in divorce.

She had two children: a daughter from her marriage to Wilhelms, and a son with Tarkkonen.

Despite her fame and reputation as a diva, Eronen was a private person, with a small circle of close friends and relatives. She went to great efforts to manage her public image.

Eronen suffered from ill health in her final years, including in the autumn of 1987 a major stroke, which took away her ability to speak, and she died shortly afterwards. She is buried in the artists' section of the Hietaniemi Cemetery of Helsinki.
