= Michael Schilkin =

Russian-born ceramist

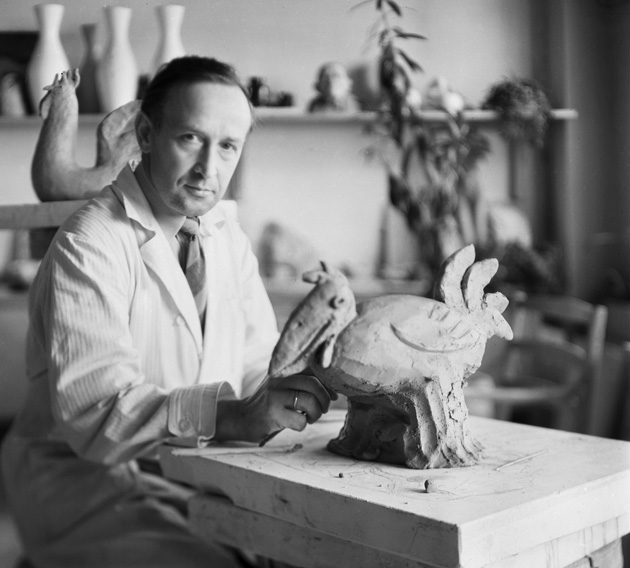
Michael Schilkin

Michael Schilkin (1 May 1900 – 3 May 1962) was a Russian-born ceramist who is best known for having worked in the art department of Arabia.

Schilkin was born in Trubino, Tver oblast, Russia and lived in Torzhok. In his youth, he worked as a tailor in Saint Petersburg, as a clerk in a railway station in Leningrad, and in 1917 following the Russian Revolution, as a sailor on a yacht, and then as a stone cutter in Helsinki, Finland.

In 1921, while sailing with a local sailing club on Lake Ladoga, Schilkin accidentally crossed the Finnish border. The team was arrested by the border guard and subsequently released. After this incident, Schilkin moved to Mikkeli and found work on a farm.

Research shows that Schilkin studied at Aalto University School of Arts, Design and Architecture in Finland and was active as an artist from 1935 until his death. His Finnish citizenship was obtained in 1937 with the help of sculptor Wäinö Aaltonen and in 1958 he received the Pro Finlandia medal.

Schilkin worked as a ceramist and created small sculptures and figurines by mixing different kinds of glass with other materials and was known for his use of strong colors.

Schilkin is buried in the Orthodox section of the Hietaniemi cemetery in Helsinki.
