= Usko Meriläinen =

Finnish composer (1930–2004)

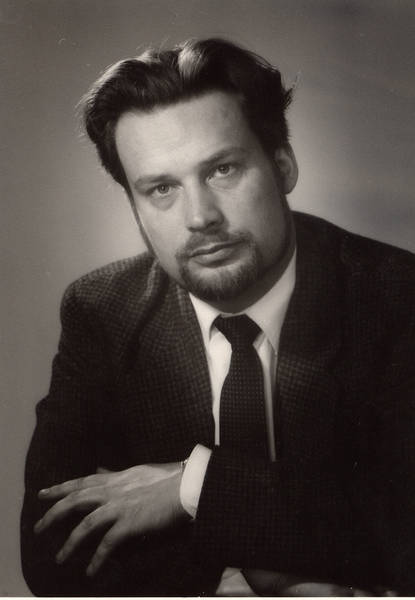
Usko Meriläinen.

Usko Aatos Meriläinen (27 January 1930 – 12 November 2004) was a Finnish composer. He was born in Tampere.

Usko Meriläinen studied orchestral conducting with Leo Funtek and composition with Aarre Merikanto at the Sibelius Academy. Meriläinen conducted the Finnish Opera Choir from 1954 to1956, the Kuopio City Orchestra from 1956 to 1957, and the Tampere Workers' Theater Orchestra from 1957 to 1961. He was chairman of the Finnish Composers' Association from 1981 to 1992 and served as artistic advisor of the Tampere Biennale.

In 1954 his Partita for Brass won second prize in the Thor Johnson Brass Composition competition in Cincinnati, Ohio. Meriläinen won an award for Jussi's film Private Area in 1963. He was also awarded the Pro Finlandia Prize in 1987.

Meriläinen was married to choreographer Ruth Matso, who choreographed the premiere of his ballet Arius. Their daughter is actress Lena Meriläinen, and their son is producer Ari Meriläinen, who is the father of writer and politician Rosa Meriläinen.

He is buried in the Hietaniemi Cemetery in Helsinki.

== Selected works ==
=== Symphonies ===
- Symphony No. 1 (composed 1953–1955)
- Symphony No. 2 (1964)
- Symphony No. 3 (1971)
- Alasin (The Anvil, Symphony No.4, Electronic Symphony) (1975)
- Symphony No. 5 (1976)
- Kehrä (The Spindle) (Symphony No. 6) (1996)

=== Concertante ===
- Concerto for Piano and Orchestra No. 1 (1955)
- Concerto for Orchestra (No. 1) (1956)
- Piano Concerto no. 2 (1969)
- Concerto per 13 (1971)
- Cello Concerto (1975)
- Dialogues for piano and orchestra (1977)
- Kineettinen runo ('Kinetic Poem') for piano and orchestra (1981)
- Visions and Whispers for flute and orchestra (1985)
- Aikaviiva (Timeline) (Concerto No. 2 for Orchestra) (1989)
- Guitar Concerto (1990)
- Kirje sellistille (Letter to the cellist) (1990)
- Summer Concerto ”Geasseija niehku” for string orchestra (1993-4)

=== Chamber music ===
- Trauerlied for viola solo (1962)
- String Quartet No. 1 (1965)
- String Quartet No. 2 'Kyma '(1979)
- String Quartet No. 3 (1992)
- Divertimento (1968)
- Metamorfora per 7 (1969)
- Concerto for double bass and percussion (1973)
- Simultus for Four (1979)
- Summer Playing for Flute and Grasshoppers (1979)
- Sonata for alto saxophone and Piano (1982)
- Flute - water mirror (1984)
- Quattro notturni per arpa (1984–1985)
- Mouvements circulaires en Douceur (1985)
- "Feast of Henriette" (1995)

=== Other ===
- Viimeiset kiusaukset (1959, incidental music)
- Arius (ballet) (composed 1958–1960)
- Epyllion (1963)
- Musique du Printemps (1969)
- Psyche (ballet) (1973)
- Ku–gu–ku (1979)
- Exodus (1988)
