= Georg August Wallin =

Finnish orientalist, explorer and professor (1811–1852)

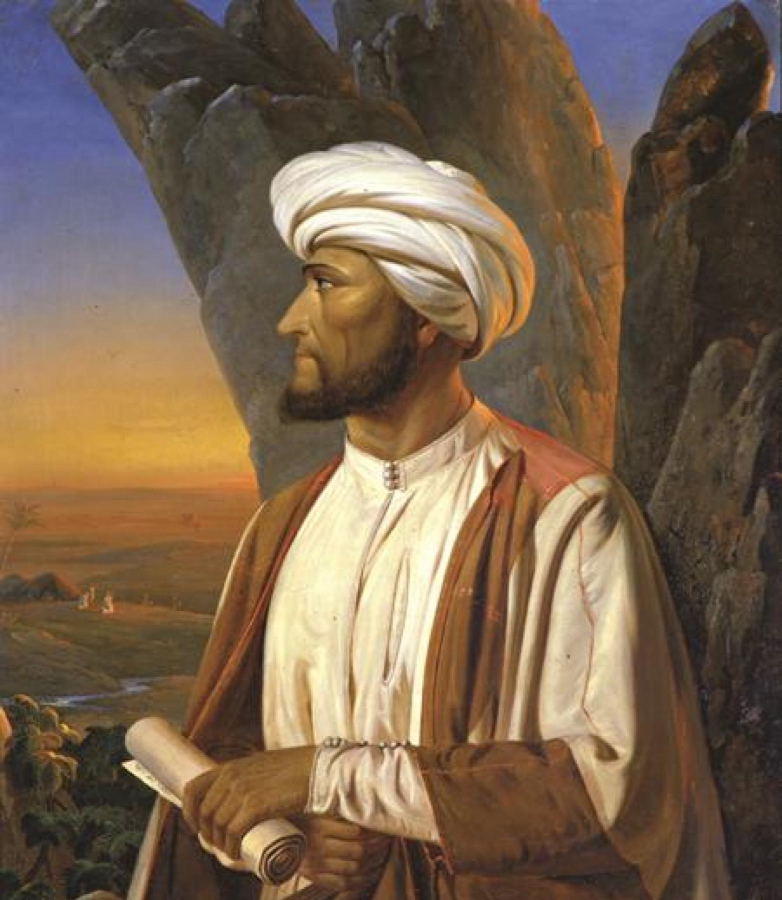
- Born: 24 October 1811; Sund, Åland
- Died: 23 October 1852 (aged 40); Helsinki
- Resting place: Hietaniemi Cemetery, Helsinki
- Other name: Abd al-Wali (Arabic: عبد الولي)
- Occupations: Orientalist, explorer, professor
- Employer: University of Helsinki
- Known for: Expeditions across the Arabian Peninsula; first Western scholar to study spoken Arabic systematically

Georg August Wallin (Finnish: Yrjö Aukusti Wallin), also known as Abd al-Wali (Arabic: عبد الولي; 24 October 1811 – 23 October 1852), was a Finland Swede orientalist, explorer and professor at the University of Helsinki, remembered for his journeys across the Arabian Peninsula in the 1840s. He was the first Western scholar to study spoken Arabic systematically, the first European to record Bedouin poetry and dialects in the field, and among the first Europeans to reach several locations in northern Arabia. Internationally he has been ranked among the most capable European explorers of Arabia, and was awarded the gold medal of the Royal Geographical Society in 1851.

== Biography ==
=== Early life and education ===
Wallin was born in the municipality of Sund, Åland, in 1811, and his parents were civil servant Israel Wallin (1777–1839) and Johanna Maria Ahrenberg (1779–1854). He attended Cathedral School of Åbo in Turku and moved to Rauma with the school after the Great Fire of Turku in 1827. The following year, however, he left school and continued his studies privately. In 1829, he enrolled to study Oriental languages at the University of Helsinki, graduating with an MA after seven years of studies. He then began writing a dissertation about Arabic and Persian, while working as a librarian in the university library. In 1839, he travelled to St. Petersburg, where he studied at the Institute of Oriental Languages, under the Russian Ministry of Foreign Affairs, under the Egyptian sheikh Muhammad 'Ayyad al-Tantawi in 1841–1842. Al-Tantawi, whose accounts of Egypt and the Arab world made a deep impression on Wallin, is considered to have had the single greatest influence on Wallin and his decision to travel to the Middle East.

=== Expeditions to Arabia ===
Wallin's motives for travelling to Arabia were of two kinds. In his application for a research grant he emphasised the scholarly neglect of Arabic dialects, which his journey would help remedy, and his wish to study the Wahhabi movement, which was then exerting a decisive influence on Islam across the Arabian Peninsula. On a personal level, he felt alienated from what he saw as the superficiality of European civilisation and was drawn to the romantic ideal of the unspoiled Orient.

In 1843 he travelled via Marseille and Constantinople to Cairo, where he got to know the customs of the Middle East and the rudiments of Islam. He adopted a simple way of life and passed himself off as a Muslim, taking the name Abd al-Wali, to allow him to get closer to Muslim society. While many people believe Wallin converted to Islam, there is no proof to support this claim in his diaries and letters, and his writings rather indicate scepticism toward religion.

In 1845, he began his first expedition to visit Mecca, a city forbidden to non-Muslims. This expedition took him from Cairo via Ma'an, Al-Jauf, Jubba and Ha'il to Medina, Mecca and Jeddah, from where he returned to Cairo. On his second expedition in 1846, he visited Palestine and Syria. His third expedition in 1847 had been intended to explore the Wahhabi region of Najd, but on reaching Ha'il he realized that his identity as a Muslim had been compromised, so he turned north and travelled in Mesopotamia and Persia before returning via Baghdad and Damascus to Cairo in 1849.

=== Return and professorship ===
He wrote that he found European culture oppressive and that he felt estranged from Europe after his years in the East. By 1850, Wallin had returned to Europe, where the British Royal Geographical Society published his Notes taken during a Journey through part of Northern Arabia and awarded him its gold medal in recognition of his ground-breaking research. He also received a prize from the East India Company and a silver medal from the Société de Géographie. Wallin completed his doctoral thesis in 1851 and was subsequently appointed Professor of Oriental Literature at the University of Helsinki.

Both the Royal and Russian Geographical societies sought to fund another expedition to Southwest Asia, but negotiations stalled; Wallin died before any agreement was reached. Wallin died unexpectedly on 23 October 1852, only three years after his return to Finland and a day before his forty-first birthday.

=== Legacy ===
The Finnish translators of Wallin's letters have described him as a kind of "patron saint of Finnish oriental research". The Finnish Oriental Society holds its annual meeting on his birthday. Internationally, his qualifications have been compared to those of U. J. Seetzen and J. L. Burckhardt, and he has been characterised as the first modern Arabian explorer to prepare thoroughly for his mission. His grave in Hietaniemi Cemetery, a Christian cemetery in Helsinki, displays his name Georg Aug. Wallin with his Arabic name Abd al-Wali in Arabic letters beneath it.

Wallin's international reputation was at its highest immediately after his expeditions. His observations of Arabic phonetics remained significant well into the 20th century. Over time, however, Wallin has faded into a footnote in the history of scholarship, partly because most of his notes were written in Swedish and thus remained inaccessible to international researchers, and partly because of his early death. The explorer Richard Burton, preparing for his own journey to Mecca and Medina, wrote a long letter of questions to Wallin — but by the time he did so, Wallin was already dead.

In the Middle East, Wallin is today held in high regard. In his descriptions of conditions and geography across Arabia he is often the first — and only — source to have recorded information about individual tribes and locations, a fact that has considerably enhanced his standing particularly in Saudi Arabia. Unlike many other travellers in the region at the time, he was not perceived as a spy in the service of a foreign power.

Wallin's collected journey writings were published posthumously in the 1860s, edited by S. G. Elmgren. A complete edition of his writings was published in Swedish (partially in translation) during 2010–2017. An English-language and an Arabic-language edition are being planned.

== Bibliography ==
- Notes Taken During a Journey Though Part of Northern Arabia in 1848. Published by the Royal Geographical Society in 1851. (Online version.)
- Narrative of a Journeys From Cairo to Medina and Mecca by Suez, Arabia, Tawila, Al-Jauf, Jubbe, Hail and Nejd, in 1845, Royal Geographical Society, 1854
- William R. Mead, G. A. Wallin and the Royal Geographical Society, Studia Orientalia 23, 1958.
- Georg Wallin, reprinted in Travels in Arabia, New York: Oleander Press, 1979:
  - Notes taken during a Journey through part of Northern Arabia, Journal of the Royal Geographical Society 20, 1851.
  - Narrative of a Journey from Cairo to Medina and Mecca, Journal of the Royal Asiatic Society 24, 1854.
  - Narrative of a Journey from Cairo to Jerusalem, Journal of the Royal Geographical Society 25, 1855.
- Georg August Wallins Reseanteckningar från Orienten, åren 1843–1849: Dagbok och bref. (Four volumes.) Efter resandens död utgifna af S. G. Elmgren. Helsingfors 1864–1866.
- Yrjö Aukusti Wallin ja hänen matkansa Arabiassa by Julius Krohn (at Project Gutenberg).
- Wallin, Georg August: Skrifter 1: Studietiden och resan till Alexandria. Utgivna av Kaj Öhrnberg och Patricia Berg under medverkan av Kira Pihlflyckt, Svenska litteratursällskapet i Finland, Helsingfors 2010. ISBN 978-951-583-189-7 (Online version.)
- Wallin, Georg August: Skrifter 2: Det första året i Egypten 1843–1844. Utgivna av Kaj Öhrnberg och Patricia Berg under medverkan av Kira Pihlflyckt, Svenska litteratursällskapet i Finland, Helsingfors 2011. ISBN 978-951-583-227-6 (Online version.)
- Wallin, Georg August: Skrifter 3: Kairo och resan till Övre Egypten 1844–1845. Utgivna av Kaj Öhrnberg och Patricia Berg under medverkan av Kira Pihlflyckt, Svenska litteratursällskapet i Finland, Helsingfors 2012. ISBN 978-951-583-249-8 (Online version.)
- Wallin, Georg August: Skrifter 4: Färderna till Mekka och Jerusalem 1845–1847. Utgivna av Kaj Öhrnberg och Patricia Berg under medverkan av Kira Pihlflyckt, Svenska litteratursällskapet i Finland, Helsingfors 2013. ISBN 978-951-583-269-6 (Online version.)
- Wallin, Georg August: Skrifter 5: Norra Arabiska halvön och Persien 1847–1849. Utgivna av Kaj Öhrnberg, Patricia Berg och Kira Pihlflyckt, Svenska litteratursällskapet i Finland, Helsingfors 2014. ISBN 978-951-583-285-6 (Online version.)
- Wallin, Georg August: Skrifter 6: Resan hem via London 1849–1850. Utgivna av Kaj Öhrnberg, Patricia Berg och Kira Pihlflyckt, Svenska litteratursällskapet i Finland, Helsingfors 2015. ISBN 978-951-583-339-6 (Online version.)
- Wallin, Georg August: Skrifter 7: Professorsåren i Helsingfors 1850–1852. Utgivna av Kaj Öhrnberg, Patricia Berg och Kira Pihlflyckt, Svenska litteratursällskapet i Finland, Helsingfors 2016. ISBN 978-951-583-358-7 (Online version.)
- Wallin, Georg August: Skrifter: Appendix. Material nedtecknat på Arabiska halvön 1845–1848. Utgivna av Kaj Öhrnberg, Patricia Berg och Kira Pihlflyckt, Svenska litteratursällskapet i Finland, Helsingfors 2017. ISBN 978-951-584-411-9 (Online version.)

== Literature ==
- Patricia Berg, Sofia Häggman, Kaj Öhrnberg, Jaakko Hämeen-Anttila & Heikki Palva; Nina Edgren-Henrichson (Editor): Dolce far niente in Arabia: Georg August Wallin and His Travels in the 1840s. Museum Tusculanum Press, University of Copenhagen 2014. ISBN 978-87-635-4304-0
- Georg August Wallin; Knut Tallqvist (1905), Bref och dagboksanteckningar / af Georg August Wallin. Jämte En lefnadsteckning utgifna af Knut Tallqvist, Skrifter utgivna av Svenska litteratursällskapet i Finland (in Swedish), Helsinki: Society of Swedish Literature in Finland, ISSN 0039-6842, Wikidata Q113394132
