= Viljo Kajava =

Finnish poet and writer (1909–1998)

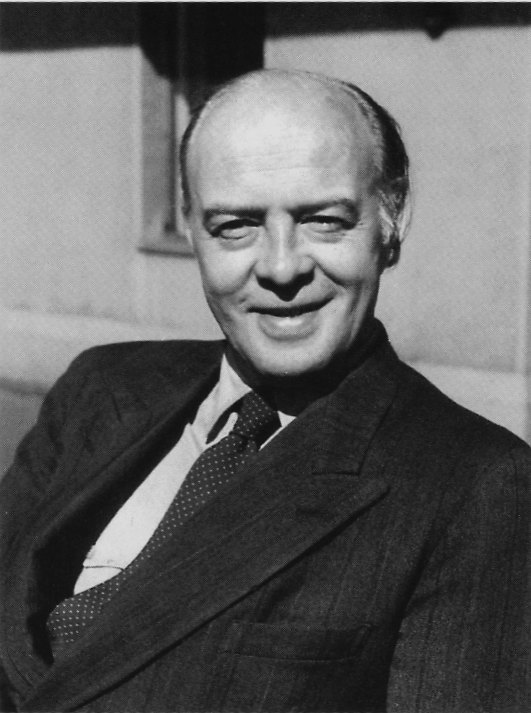
- Born: 22 September 1909; Tampere
- Died: 2 February 1998 (aged 88); Helsinki
- Resting place: Hietaniemi Cemetery
- Occupations: poet, journalist
- Writing career
- Notable awards: Pro Finlandia

Viljo Lennart Kajava (22 September 1909 – 2 February 1998) was a Finnish poet and writer. He was born in Tampere, and his first collections of poems were released in 1935. During his 50-year career he published nearly 40 books, most of them poems. Kavaja's Tampereen runot ("Poems of Tampere 1918") has become a symbol of the pacifistic point of view of the Finnish Civil War.

He died in Helsinki, and is buried in the Hietaniemi Cemetery there.

Kajava studied at the University of Helsinki. He started as a writer in the mid-1930s. His production was very social and left -wing. He was a central member of the member's writer association Kiila. The Winter War between 1939 and 1940 was a major transformation for Kajava, and he moved from sociality to nature and impressionist lyrics in his production. During the Continuation War, Kajava served as a front correspondent in the TK company.
