= Onni Okkonen =

Finnish art historian (1886–1962)

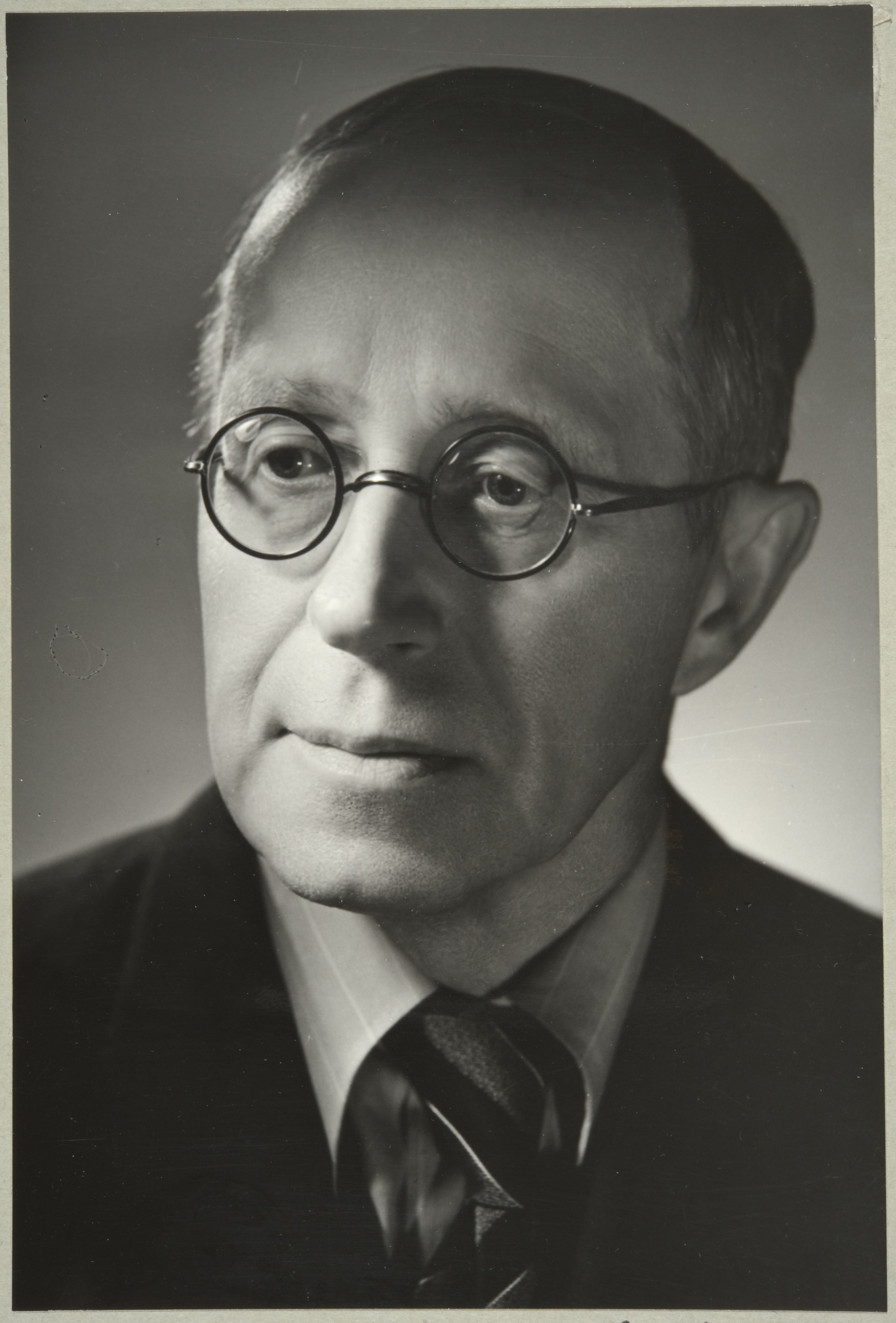
Onni Okkonen in the 1930s.

Onni Okkonen (20 August 1886 – 18 May 1962) was a Finnish art historian based at the University of Helsinki.

Okkonen was born in Korpiselkä in Karelia and earned his Ph.D. in 1914. He was appointed professor of art history at the University of Helsinki in 1927, a position that he held until 1945. His main research interests were Finnish art and Italian Renaissance art. His works include an overview of the history of Finnish art, Suomen taiteen historia (1945), which was translated into English in 1946, as well as monographies on Wäinö Aaltonen, Juho Rissanen and Akseli Gallen-Kallela. He was also active as an art critic for the newspaper Uusi Suomi, as well as a fiction writer and painter.

He was chairman of the Kalevala Society from 1937 to 1942 and a member of the Academy of Finland from 1948 to 1956.

He is buried in the Hietaniemi Cemetery in Helsinki.
