= Erik von Frenckell =

Swedish-speaking Finnish nobleman

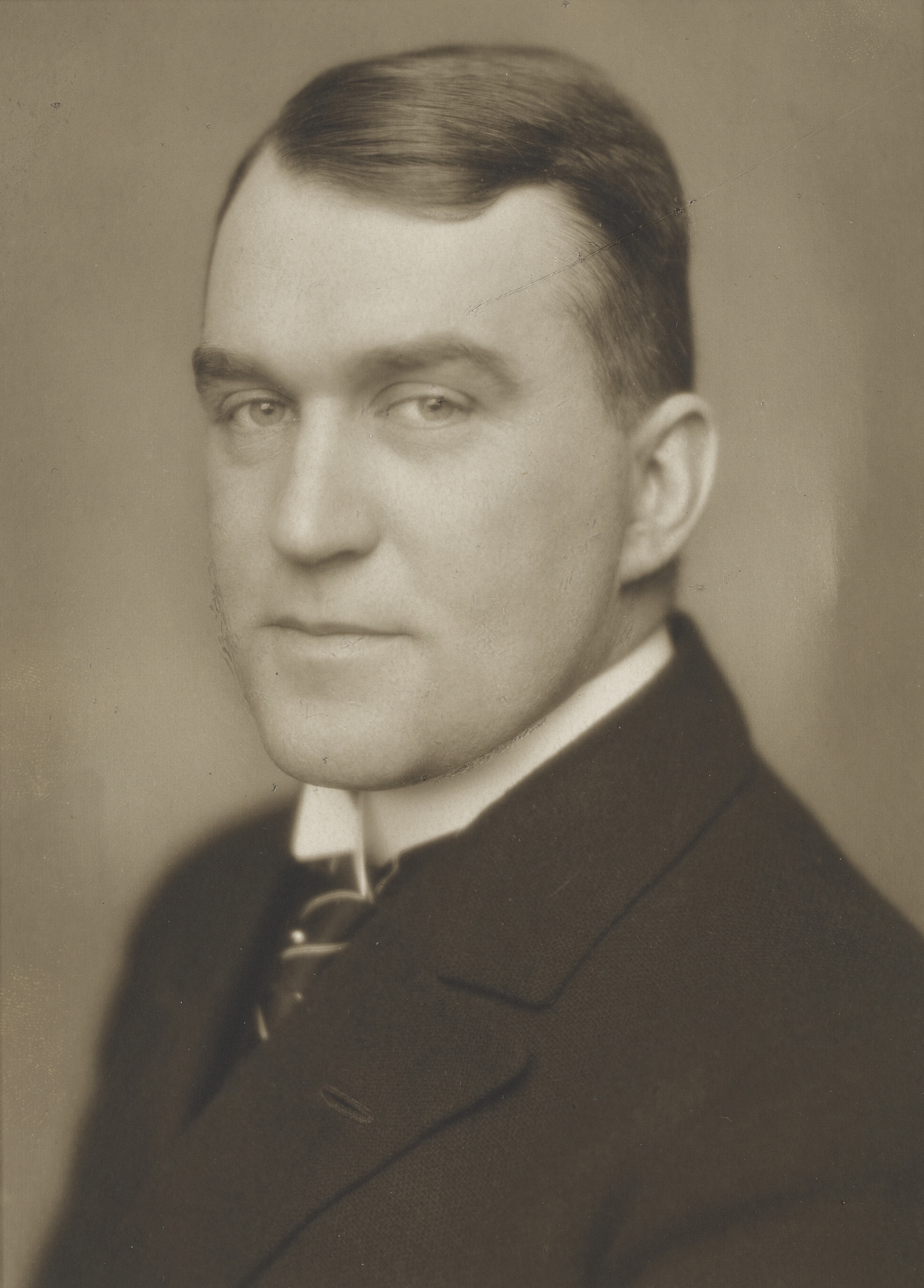
- Born: Erik von Frenckell; 18 November 1887; Helsinki, Grand Duchy of Finland
- Died: 13 September 1977 (aged 89); Espoo, Finland
- Resting place: Hietaniemi cemetery, Helsinki

Erik von Frenckell (18 November 1887 – 13 September 1977) was a Swedish-speaking Finnish nobleman, member of the Parliament of Finland, member of the International Olympic Committee and a vice president of the International Football Association FIFA.

== Biography ==
Erik von Frenckell was the son of the factory owner Carl von Frenckell and Fanny Ehrnrooth.

He graduated from Dresden University of Technology on engineering in 1912. After his graduation von Frenckell returned to Finland and worked on business management. In 1917 he was elected to Helsinki City Council as a member of Swedish People's Party. During the 1918 Finnish Civil War von Frenckell fought for the White Guard. During the war he was promoted to reserve lieutenant and later to reserve captain in 1932 and major in 1940.

He was appointed commercial attaché in Berlin in 1918 and worked as editor-in-chief of Finansbladet from 1923 to 1944. Frenckell was one of the founders of Finska Socker Ab and served on the company's board of directors until 1966, serving as chairman from 1950. He was also a director of the Bank of Finland from 1922 to 1923.

From 1927 to 1939 he was a member of the Finnish Parliament. Frenckell worked as Chairman of the Bank Council 1930–1939. He was a member of the Swedish People's Party, where he worked as a member of its central board from 1918 to 1924 and served as vice-chairman of its Helsinki district from 1922 to 1928.

Von Frenckell is best known on his work as a sports administrator. He was the president of Finnish Football Association from 1918 to 1952 and a member of the FIFA Executive Committee 1927–1932 and 1950–1954. On his first period von Frenckell served also as a vice president of FIFA. He was a member of the International Olympic Committee from 1948 to 1976. Von Frenckell was one of the key persons on Helsinki's nomination as the host of the 1952 Summer Olympics.

His daughter was Finnish avant-garde theater director Vivica Bandler.

Sporting positions
Preceded by (United Kingdom) Lord Burghley	President of Organizing Committee for Summer Olympic Games; 1952	Succeeded by (Australia) Wilfrid Kent Hughes
