= Aarre Merikanto =

Finnish composer

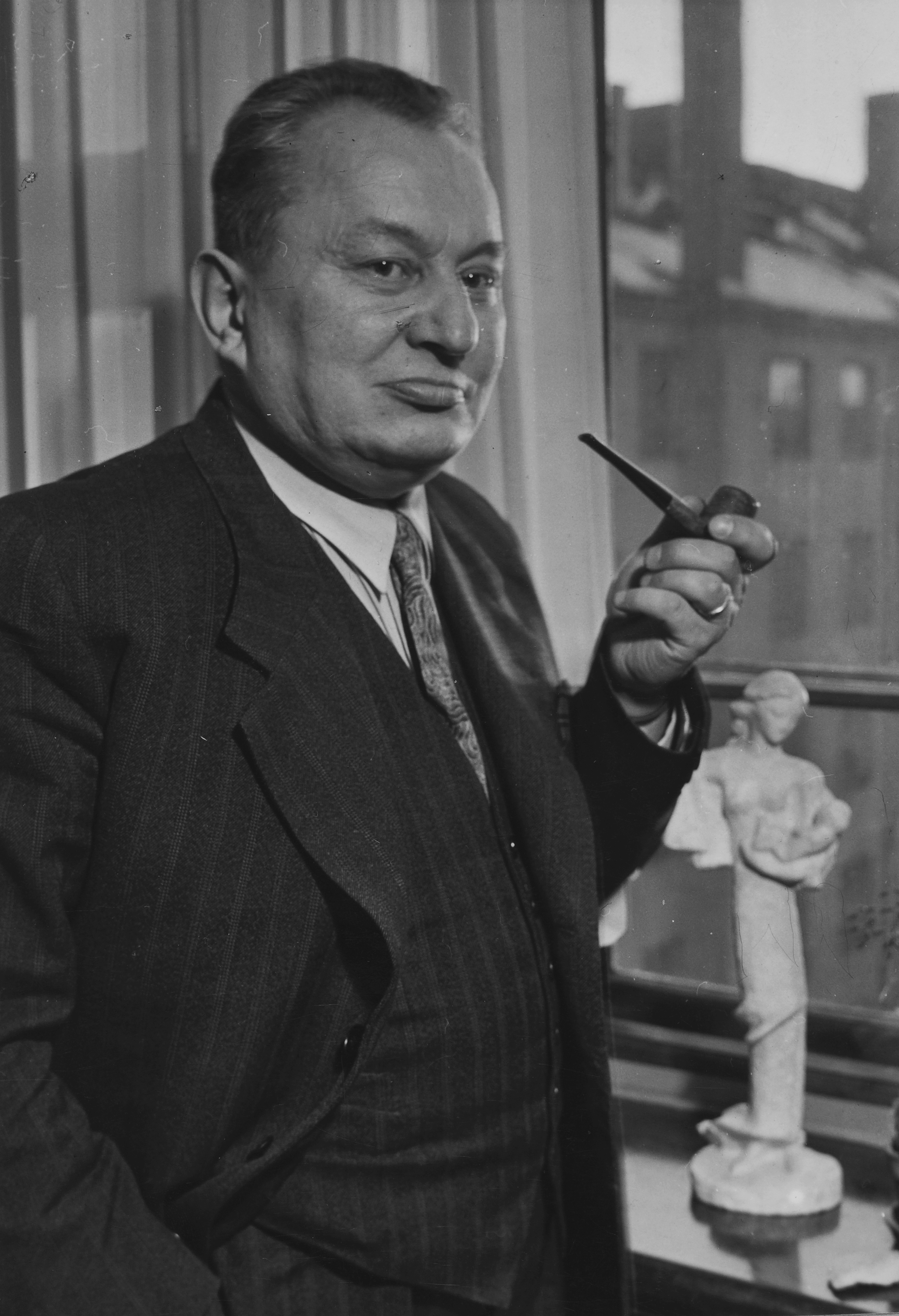
- Merikanto (c. 1950s)
- Born: 29 June 1893; Helsinki, Finland
- Died: 28 September 1958 (aged 65); Helsinki, Finland
- Spouses: Meri Grönmark; Evi Mähönen
- Children: 4 (including Ukri Merikanto)
- Parent(s): Oskar Merikanto; Liisa Häyrynen

Aarre Merikanto (29 June 1893 – 28 September 1958) was a Finnish composer.

== Life and career ==
He was born in Helsinki, Grand Duchy of Finland. His childhood he spent in Vilppula, Finland. He married Meri Grönmark in 1919. They had two daughters. He later married Evi Sylvia Mähönen. They had two sons, Ukri Uolevi Merikanto, a sculptor and Pan Ylermi Merikanto.

He is considered a key figure in early Finnish modernism (together with Väinö Raitio and Ernest Pingoud) and several of his works, most notably the opera Juha, have obtained posthumous attention. As professor of composition in the Sibelius Academy (1951–1958) Merikanto taught several Finnish composers of the next generation, including Einojuhani Rautavaara, Usko Meriläinen, Aulis Sallinen and Paavo Heininen. He studied music in Helsinki 1911, Leipzig 1912–1914 and Moscow 1916–1917. Merikanto's early style was rooted in Finnish romanticism, but in the 1920s he developed a personal, atonal but not dodecaphonic Modernist style. The reception of Merikanto's works of this period was mixed: the "Schott" Concerto for nine instruments was awarded in a competition organized by the German publishers Schott & Söhne, but his domestic Finnish audiences and critics were generally unenthusiastic and his opera Juha, today considered one of his major works, was never performed during Merikanto's lifetime. Disappointed with the reactions, starting in the early 1930s, Merikanto gradually abandoned his more radical style and turned towards a more traditional idiom based on Neoclassicism. He also destroyed or mutilated the scores of several works from his earlier style period, some of which were later reconstructed by his last composition student Paavo Heininen. His work was also part of the music event in the art competition at the 1948 Summer Olympics.

Merikanto was diagnosed with lung cancer in the summer 1957, and he died on 28 September the following year, in Helsinki, aged 65.

== Main works ==
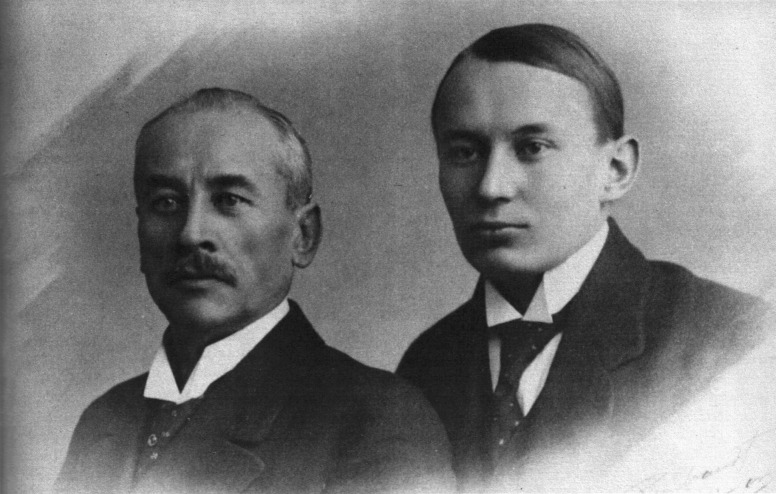
Aarre Merikanto (right) with his father Oskar Merikanto in 1919.

- Juha, opera (1922; premiered in 1963)
- Symphony No. 1 in B minor (1916)
- Symphony No. 2 in A major (1918)
- Symphonic Study (1928)
- Symphony No. 3 (1953)
- Violin Concerto No. 1 (1915)
- Violin Concerto No. 2 (1925)
- Violin Concerto No. 3 (1931; destroyed)
- Violin Concerto No. 4 (1954)
- Piano Concerto No. 1 (1913)
- Piano Concerto No. 2 (1937)
- Piano Concerto No. 3 (1955)
- Cello Concerto No. 1 (1919)
- Konzertstück, for cello and chamber orchestra (1923)
- Cello Concerto No. 2 (1941)
- Lemminkäinen, symphonic poem (1916)
- Pan, symphonic poem (1924)
- Notturno, symphonic poem (1928)
- The Abduction of Kyllikki, symphonic poem (1936)
- Schott Concerto, for violin, clarinet, horn, and string sextet (1925)
- Nonet (1926)
- Fantasia (1923)
- Ten Pieces for Orchestra (1930)
- Olympic Fanfare (1939)
- Song of the City by the Sea, cantata (1949–1950)
- Genesis, cantata (1955)

== Chronological list of compositions ==
- 1911 Helena, 1act opera, soli pno, performed once, then mutilated
- 1912 Ballade, pno, lost
- 1912 Lieder Ohne Worte I-II, pno
- 1912 String Trio, lost
- 1913 Impromptu b, pno
- 1913 op. 3 Piano Concerto 1f#
- 1913 String Quartet c#, unfin, lost
- 1913 String Quartet g, lost
- 1914 Concert Ouverture, lost
- 1914 Serenade, vcl str
- 1914–16 op. 5 Symphony 1 b
- 1915 Music for Violin & Piano
- 1915 op. 8 Theme 5 Variations & Fugue, orch, originally 9 variations
- 1915 op. 9 Violin Concerto 1 g
- 1915 Savannah-la-Mar, sop orch
- 1916 Cavatina, vln pno
- 1916 Four Pieces, pno
- 1916 Moderato sentito, vln or vcl +pno
- 1916 op. 10 Lemminkainen, tone poem
- 1917 A Dream, tone poem, lost
- 1917 op. 17 String Quartet e
- 1917 Piano Trio a
- 1918 Alla Marcia, Finland's Young Guard, pno or orch
- 1918 Impression on Jail, vln pno
- 1918 op. 19 Symphony 2 A, War
- 1919 Andantino, pno
- 1919 Illusion, pno
- 1919 Little Tale, pno
- 1919 op. 20 Six Pieces, pno
- 1919 op. 21 Cello Concerto 1 D
- 1919 Pièces Héroiques, pno 4hnds
- 1920–22 op. 25 Juha (Aino Ackté), 3act opera
- 1922 Andantino, vln pno
- 1922 Autumn Sonnet, sop orch
- 1922 Echo, sop orch
- 1923 Fantasy, orch
- 1924 op. 28 Pan, tone poem
- 1925 Concerto for vln cl hn strsextet, Schott Concerto
- 1925 op. 30 Violin Concerto 2
- 1925 Sketch for piano
- 1925 Song of the Twilight, pno
- 1925 Suite, orch
- 1925 To the Last Living Being, vv
- 1925–26 Nonet, pno fl c-ang cl 2vln vla vcl db
- 1926 Konzertstuck, cello small orch
- 1926 Moderta, vcl pno, lost
- 1927/31? Partita per orch, (aka Suite 1)
- 1928 Symphonic Study, mutilated but reconstructed in 1981 by Paavo Heininen
- 1929 Concert Piece, vln pno, lost
- 1929 Notturno, poem, orch
- 1930 Ten Pieces for orch, incl 1927 Partita
- 1931 Violin Concerto 3, unperformed & burned by cpsr 1955
- 1932 Four Compositions, orch
- 1932 String Sextet, mutilated but reconstructed in 1993 by Paavo Heininen
- 1933 Andante Elegiaco & Canzonetta, vcl pno
- 1933 Andante Religioso, orch
- 1933 Prelude & Fugue on a theme of Robert Kajanus, orch, lost
- 1934 Canzona, str or strqt
- 1934 Dance Suite, orch
- 1934 Four Four Folk Dances, orch
- 1934 Lullaby, orch
- 1934 Sketch for Little Orchestra, unfin
- 1934–35 Abduction of Kyllikki, orch
- 1935 Caressing the Echo, vv
- 1935 Dance Vision, brass
- 1935 Melody & Song After Hunting, brass
- 1935–37 Piano Concerto 2
- 1936 Finnish Folk Melodies, orch
- 1936 Intrada, orch
- 1936 Partita, 2fl ob 2cl bsn hp
- 1936 Two Finnish Folk Dances, orch
- 1936 Two Studies: Tranquillo; Cantabile, small orch
- 1937 Five Ugrian Folk Melodies Suite 1, 5 Vogul & Ostyak melodies
- 1937 Music to the Play Panu, orch
- 1937 Scherzo, orch
- 1938 Five Ugrian Folk Melodies Suite 2, 5 Mordvin Vogul & Ostyak melodies
- 1938 r43 Ukri, mvv orch
- 1939 Olympic Fanfare 1, brass
- 1939 String Quartet a
- 1940 Three Impressions, orch
- 1941/43–44 Cello Concerto 2 d
- 1941 Two Pieces: Andante Cantabile; Allegro Ritmico, orch
- 1942 Music for Summer Night, orch
- 1943 Alla Marcia I-II, pno
- 1943 Arioso, An Ugrian Melody, fl cl str
- 1943 Preludio, vln pno
- 1943 The Swing, vv
- 1943–44 Intermezzo, vln pno
- 1946 Idiot, vv
- 1946 Improvisation, 2pno, mutilated & lost
- 1946 Midsummer, vv
- 1946 Old Lemminikainen, vv
- 1946 Silence, vv
- 1947 Fanfare, 3tpt 4hn 3trb tuba timp, lost
- 1947 The Laurel of Hellas, Hymn, vv orch
- 1948 Jubileum Cantata, 70th anniv of the publishing house WSOY, sop ten vv orch
- 1949–50 Song of the City by the Sea, cantata, sop bar vv orch
- 1951 Olympic Hymn, vv orch
- 1952 Andante, pno
- 1952 Olympic Fanfare 2, brass
- 1952 Symphony 3
- 1952 Worlds Meet, film about Olympics in Helsinki, uses olympic music
- 1953 Gold & Glory, film about Olympics in Helsinki, uses olympic music
- 1953 Ihalempi, mvv orch
- 1953 The Jump of Pan, pno
- 1954 Let this Night be Merry, vv
- 1954 Violin Concerto 4, Rainbow
- 1955 Genesis, cantata, sop vv orch
- 1955 Piano Concerto 3
- 1955 Piano Concerto 3: Pietà, vln pno
- 1956 Andante, str
- 1956 Tuhma, mvv orch
