= Vivica Bandler =

Finnish theatre director and agronomist (1917–2004)

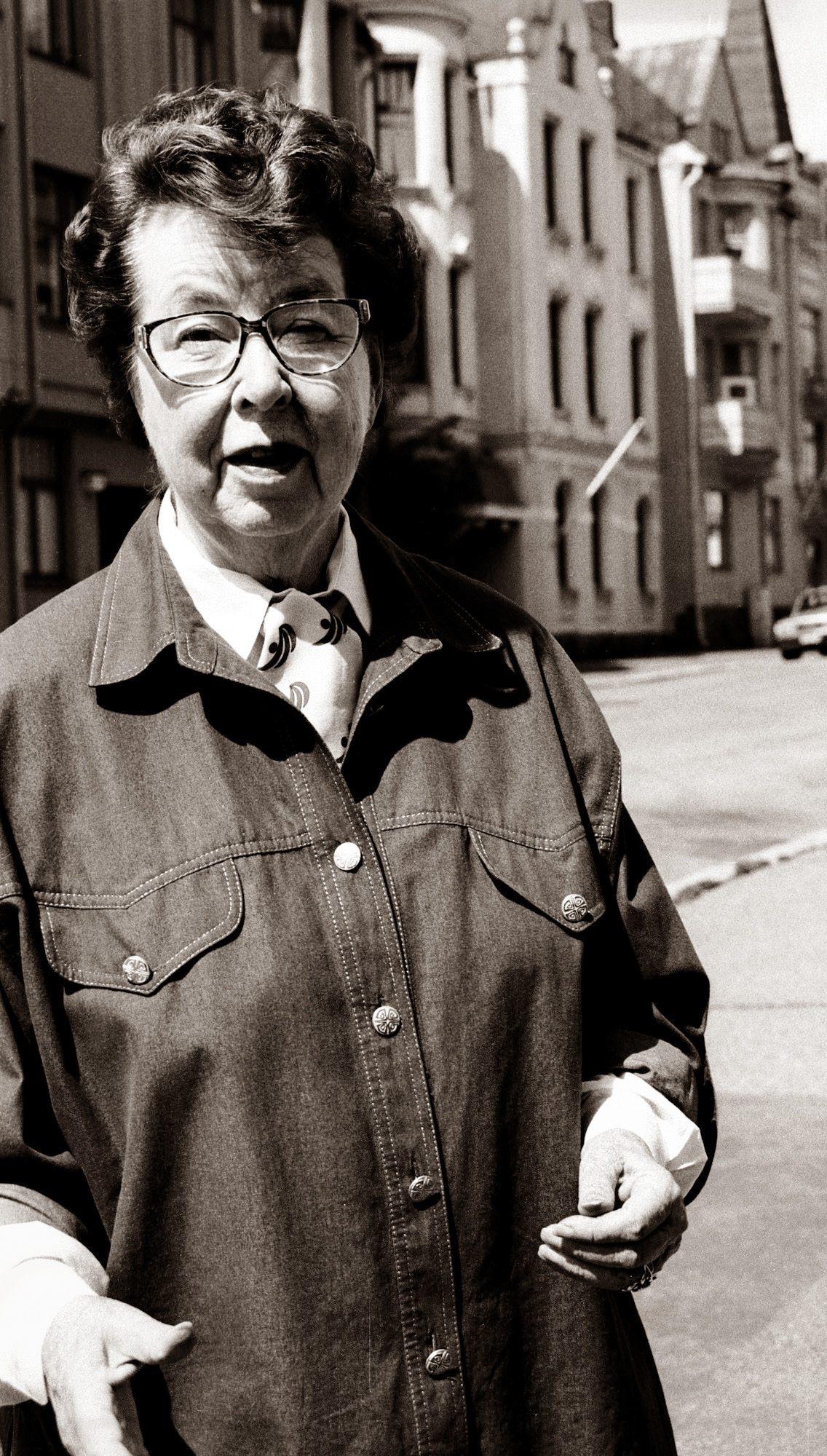
- In 1997
- Born: Vivica Aina Fanny von Frenckell; 5 February 1917; Helsinki, Finland
- Died: 30 June 2004 (aged 87); Helsinki, Finland
- Spouse: Kurt Bandler

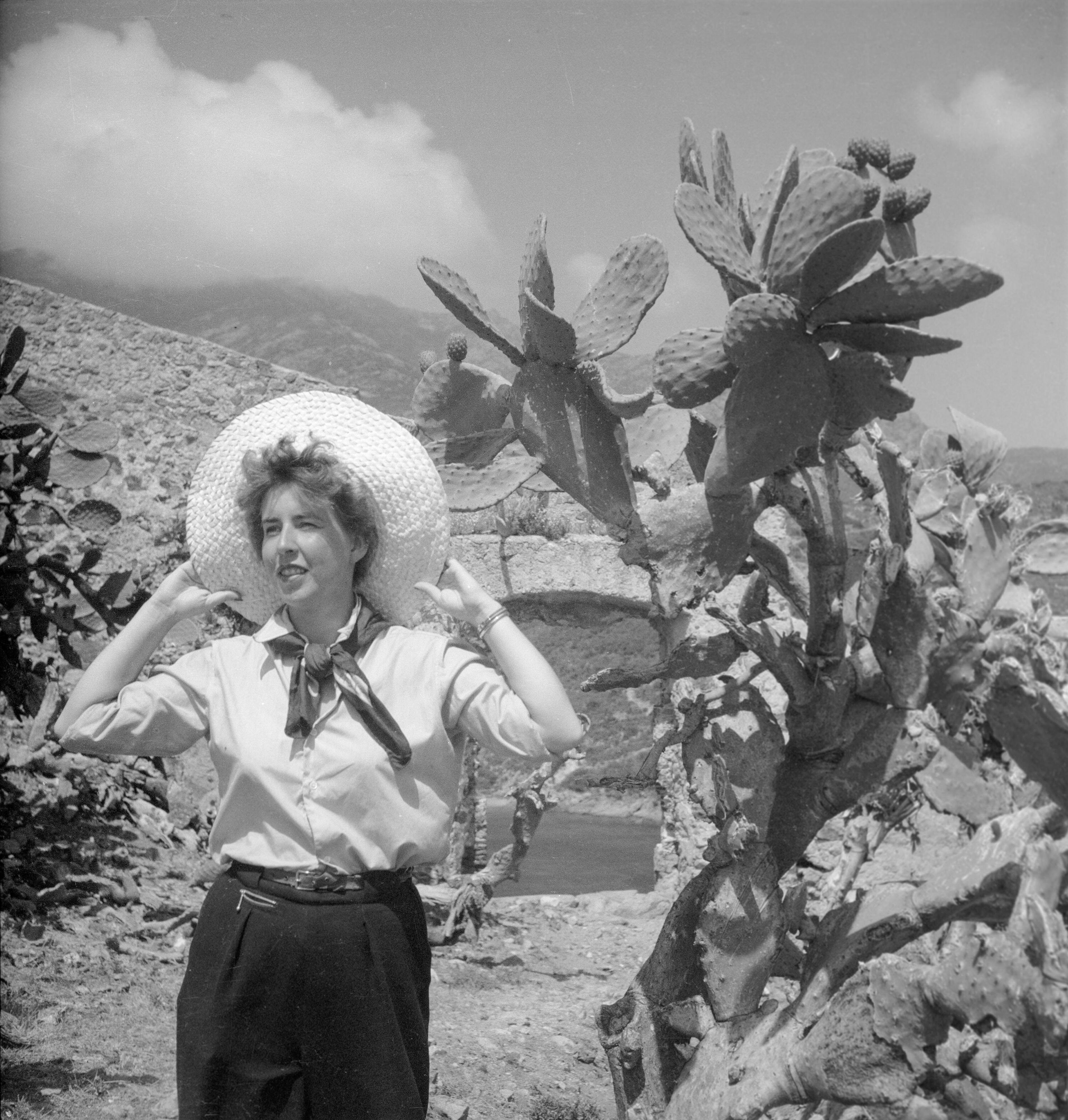
Bandler in 1949

Vivica Aina Fanny Bandler (5 February 1917 – 30 July 2004) was a Finnish theatre director and agronomist. She bought a theatre (Lilla Teatern) in Helsinki in 1955 and is credited for popularizing avant-garde Finnish theatre. She was also theatre director in Oslo (1967-69) and at the Stockholm City Theatre (1969-1979).

== Early life and education ==
Vivica von Frenckell was born in Helsinki, Finland, in 1917. She was the daughter of Helsinki Mayor Erik von Frenckell and theatre historian Ester-Margaret Lindberg. She studied agronomy, graduating in 1943. She then maintained her family home, Saari Manor, a historic home located in Tammela, Finland. She served in the Lotta Svärd during World War II and married Austrian Kurt Bandler in 1943; they divorced in 1963.

In 1946, she began a lesbian love affair with the Finnish-Swedish writer Tove Jansson, which is documented by a series of letters they exchanged in subsequent years. Jansson incorporated the pair of them into her Moomin series as Thingumy and Bob (Swedish: Tofslan och Vifslan, named for Tove and Vivica respectively). Bandler eventually decided to stay with her husband, but the two women maintained a lifelong friendship. Bandler adapted two of Jansson's Moomin stories for theatre. In cooperation with her husband, she translated the first three Moomin books into German.

== Theatre work ==
After the war she started working in an amateur theatre in Tammela. She studied, in Paris, France in the 1930s, under a French movie director. Upon her return to Helsinki she sought to become a film director, but because of her gender, the opportunity was lacking. She went on to get her degree in agriculture, instead.

In 1939, she founded Helsinki's first Swedish student theatre, Studentteatern. Bandler also served as director of the theatre. When visiting film directors came to film in Finland she often served as translator, such as Jacques Feyder. In 1962, she was awarded the Pro Finlandia medal of the Order of the Lion of Finland. She was also a Commander of the Order of the Polar Star.

== Legacy ==
The Finnish dilm director Tuija-Maija Niskanen's 1983 debut film Avskedet ("The Farewell") is supposedly based on Bandler's life.
