= Martti Pokela =

Finnish folk musician and composer

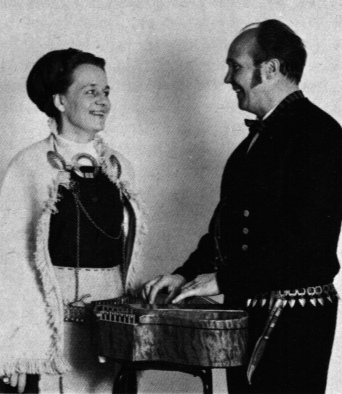
- Martti with his wife Marjatta in 1965
- Born: Martti Eliel Pokela; 23 January 1924; Haapavesi, Finland
- Died: 23 August 2007 (aged 83); Helsinki, Finland
- Occupations: Musician, educator
- Known for: Music for kantele

Martti Eliel Pokela (23 January 1924 – 23 August 2007) was a Finnish folk musician and composer. Pokela was an expert with the kantele, Finland's national musical instrument.

== Life and career ==
Pokela and his wife, Marjatta Pokela, were widely credited with ushering in a revival in interest in Finnish folk music beginning in the 1950s. Their daughter, Eveliina Pokela, began performing with them in the 1960s.

Pokela merged traditional Finnish folk music with contemporary sounds. The family's albums have also been released outside Finland.

Pokela taught kantele playing at the Sibelius Academy in Helsinki and Kuopio until 1987. He was the founder of the academy's folk music department, where he was named a full professor in 1980.

He is buried in the Hietaniemi Cemetery in Helsinki.

== Albums ==
- Keskiyön Auringon Lauluja (1969)
- Best of Kantele (1995)
- Sonata For Kantele (1996)
- Snow Kantele (1998)
- "Tuulikumpu" (2001)
- Improsette by Martti Pokela (2005)

== See also ==
- Music of Finland
