= Ukri Merikanto =

Finnish sculptor

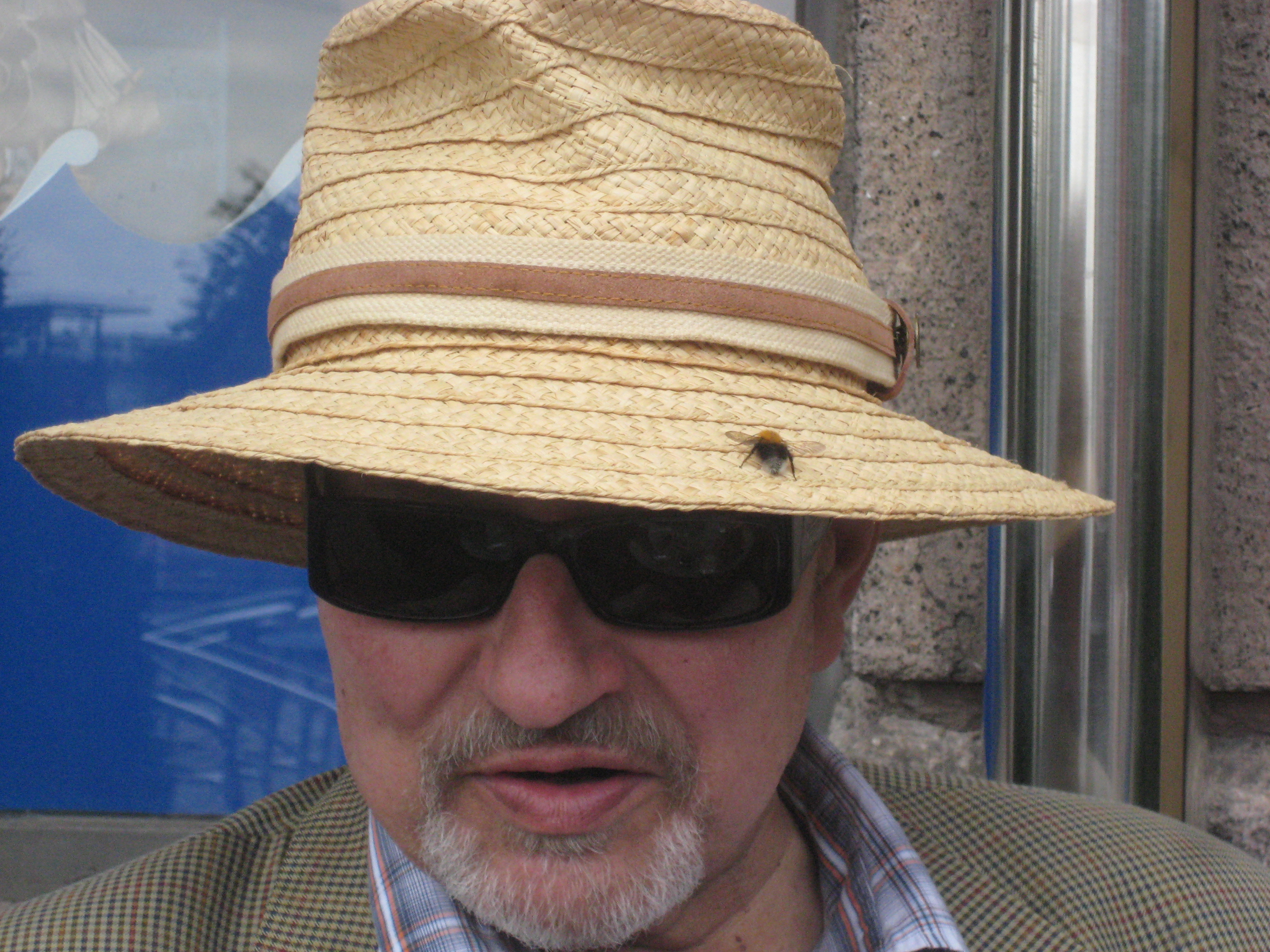
- Merikanto in 2009
- Born: Ukri Uolevi Merikanto; 20 March 1950; Helsinki, Finland
- Died: 25 July 2010 (aged 60); Helsinki, Finland
- Known for: Sculpture

Ukri Uolevi Merikanto (20 March 1950 – 25 July 2010) was a Finnish sculptor.

== Biography ==
Merikanto studied art and design at the Finnish Academy of Fine Arts in Helsinki from 1968 to 1971. From 1974 until 1979 Merikanto was employed as a teacher at the academy, where he molded plastic designs.

In most of Merikanto's works, he used stone as the material. He was a key name in Finnish modernist art. His three-dimensional works address issues such as the relationship between weight and weightlessness.

In 2009, Merikanto was awarded the Pro Finlandia Medal of the Order of the Lion of Finland.

Some of Merikanto's notable works include:

- Teräspursi (1981–1982)
- Barcarola (1991)
- Sisääntulo (1994)
- Lintukoto (1999)
- Kaukomieli (2000), a memorial sculpture for Otto Manninen, placed in Anni Swan Park in central Kangasniemi, Finland
- Con amore (2000)

Merikanto died on 25 July 2010 in Helsinki. He is buried within the Hietaniemi Cemetery beside his father and his grandfather, Oskar Merikanto.
