= Mauri Favén =

Finnish painter (1920–2006)

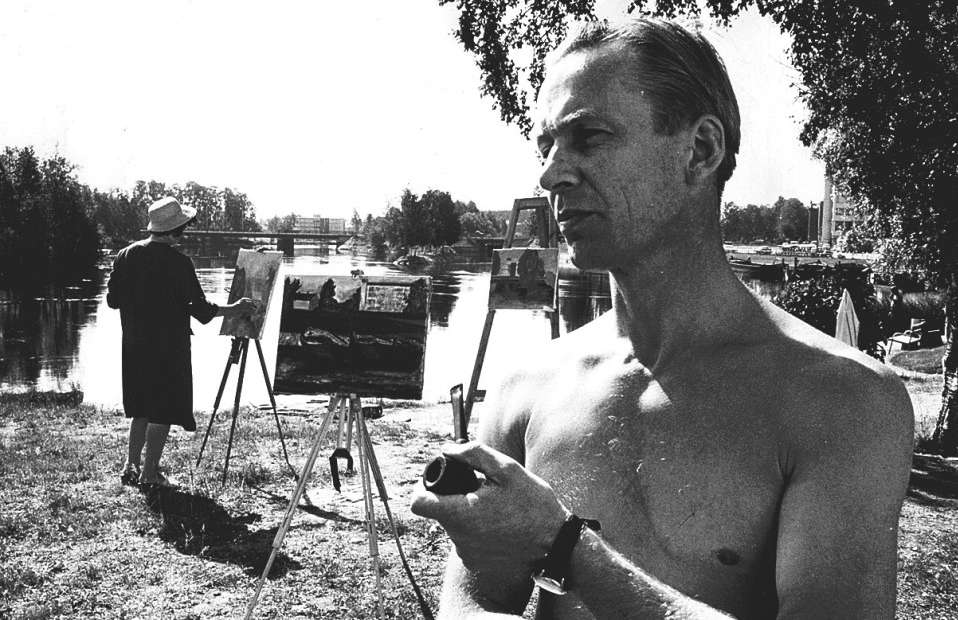
- Mauri Favén in 1963.
- Born: 26 August 1920; Tampere
- Died: 23 February 2006 (aged 85); Helsinki
- Education: Free Arts School of Finland
- Awards: Pro Finlandia

Professor Mauri Oskari Favén (26 August 1920 – 23 February 2006) was a Finnish painter. His uncle was the painter Antti Favén and his grandfather's brother was the painter Aukusti Uotila.

== Biography ==
Favén was born in Tampere. In the 1940s, he studied at the Free Arts School of Finland and the Finnish Academy of Arts. He made his debut as a painter in Helsinki in 1947, and this started his long career. Favén's works have been shown in numerous Finnish and foreign exhibitions, both private and group exhibitions.

In 1970, Favén received the Pro Finlandia prize, and in 1989 he was granted the title of Professor. From 1986 onwards, he was on an artist's retirement grant, paid by the Finnish state. He died in Helsinki.

== Works ==
Some of Favén's works are presented at the Kiasma, at the Arts Museum of Helsinki, and the Amos Anderson Art Museum. He also made many public works, which can be seen in churches, among other places.

== Sources ==
- YLE News, 24 February 2006
