= Tapani Aartomaa =

Finnish graphic designer (1934–2009)

Tapani Olavi Aartomaa (7 May 1934 – 27 October 2009) was a Finnish graphic designer, who received much attention in Poland.

Aartomaa operated his own graphic design studio and lectured for years at the Institute of Design in Helsinki and Lahti Institute of Design. He designed several hundred posters and book illustrations and received national and international recognition, exhibiting notably in Poland, Germany, Russia, Estonia and Sweden but also in Cuba and Mexico and the far eastern countries of China and South Korea.

In 1975, he was one of the acclaimed creators of the International Poster Biennale in Lahti.

== Artistic style ==
Aartomaa's artistic style is characterised by heavy use of primary colors often with an ascetic composition and typographic pictural form. Many of his works were inspired by natural elements which he used in compose abstract art. In the early 1960s he began producing book covers, and has been active in illustrating books throughout his career. In the 1970s, he was commissioned by the Lahti Museum of Design to create posters. His poster "Stop", dating back to the early 1970s is representative of his colorful poster art reflecting the environment and natural landscapes. Aatomaa had also collaborated with interior designer Yrjö Kukkapuro. Aartomaa, along with such peers as the artist Pekka Loiri have been described by a Polish art scholar and curator as next generation artists whose output use a variety of interesting graphic designs.
