= Pentti Kaskipuro =

Finnish graphic artist

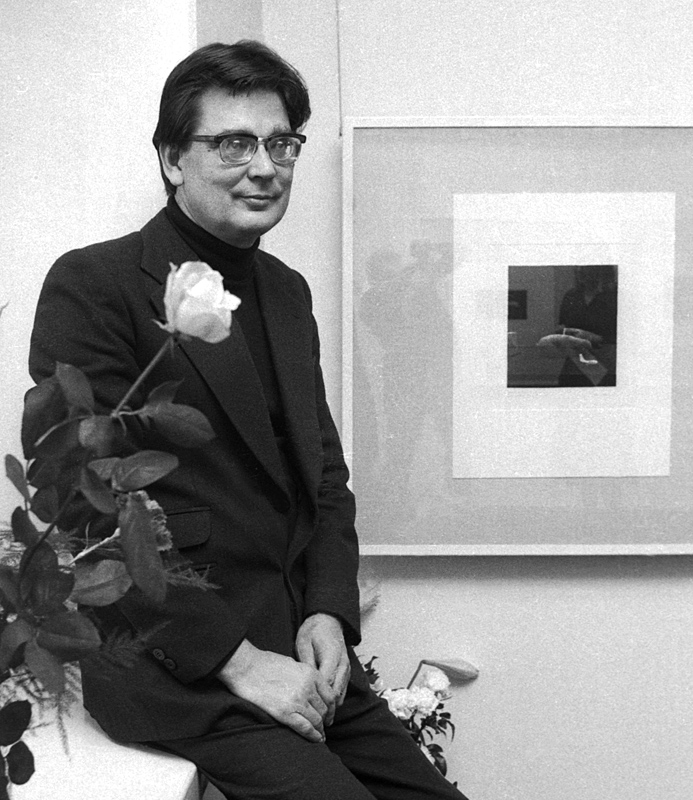
- 1979
- Born: 10 October 1930; Helsinki, Finland
- Died: 4 September 2010 (aged 79); Kauniainen, Finland

Pentti Ensio Kaskipuro (né Krut (until 1935); 1930–2010) was an artist from Finland.

During World War II, Kaskipuro was sent to Sweden as one of the Finnish war children. He returned to Finland in 1946.

Kaskipuro was one of the best-known and internationally renowned Finnish graphic artists, not only among specialist circles, but among the art-loving public. The most common themes of his drypoint and aquatint prints are everyday items, such as onions, swedes, potatoes, bread, eggs and vases of flowers.

Kaskipuro did not receive much formal art training - he was a private student of Aukusti Tuhka in 1952. After that he worked in advertisement business and learned more techniques of printmaking on his own. He became an appreciated teacher in School of art and design in 1965–1974 and as art professor 1974–1979. He is referred as "Master K" among the printmakers of the next artist generation, such as Mirja Airas, Marjatta Hanhijoki, Outi Heiskanen, Inari Krohn, Elina Luukanen, Marjatta Nuoreva and Esa Riippa.

He received the Swedish Prince Eugen Medal in 1974.
