= Essi Renvall =

Finnish sculptor (1911–1979)

Ester ”Essi” Renvall
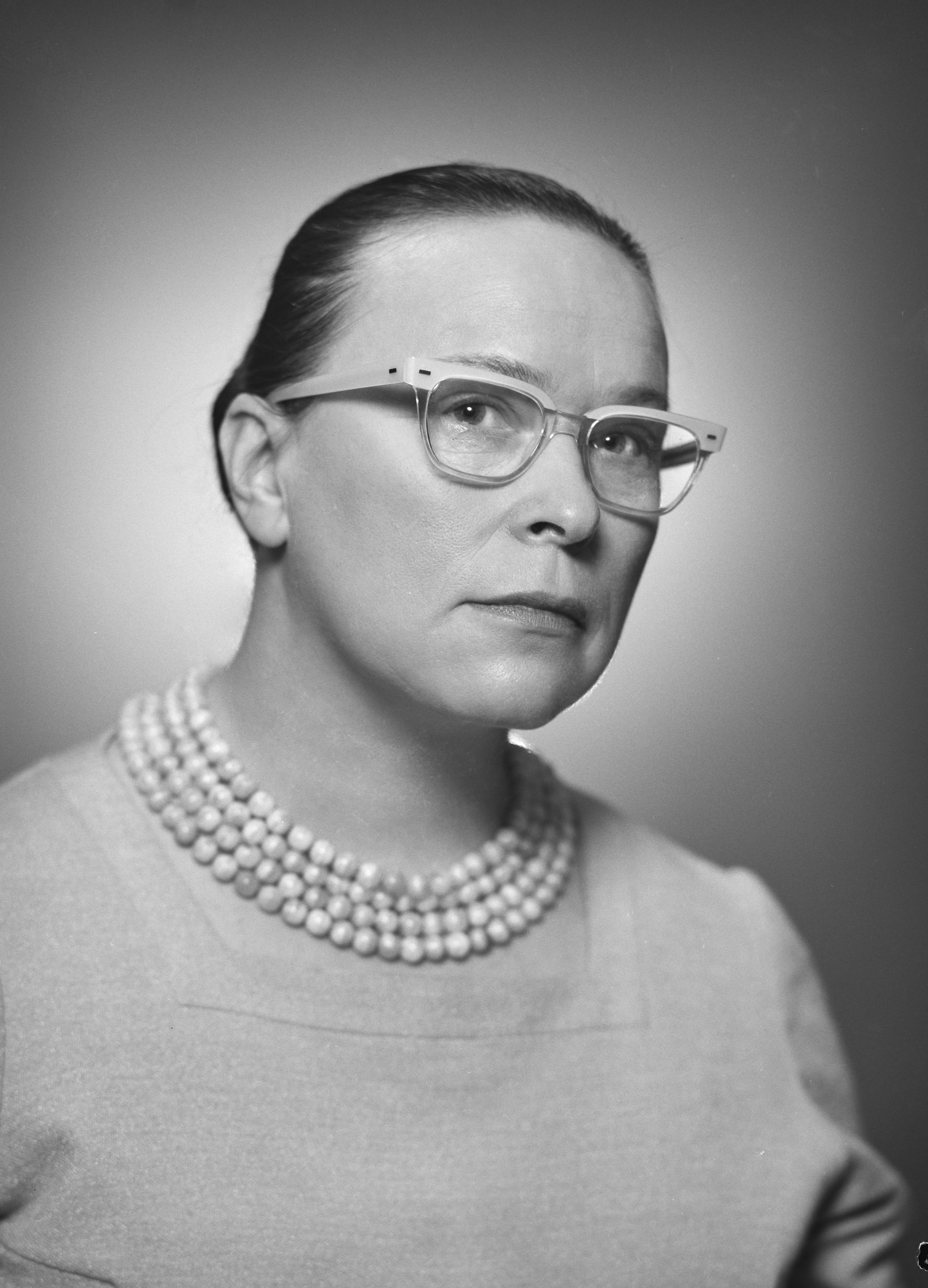
- Born: 3 October 1911; Oulu, Finland
- Died: 18 October 1979 (aged 68); Helsinki, Finland

Ester ”Essi” Renvall (née Lähde; 3 October 1911 Oulu, Finland – 18 October 1979 Helsinki, Finland) was a Finnish sculptor. She studied in Suomen Taideyhdistyksen piirustuskoulu 1930–1932. Her works were in public exhibition for the first time in 1933.

Her best known works include busts of women and children. She also made portraits of famous people, including presidents Kaarlo Juho Ståhlberg, Risto Ryti, J.K. Paasikivi and Urho Kekkonen.

Renvall was one of the first female sculptors in Finland to get commissioned public works, and to make a living for herself and her family by her artistic work. Publishing house WSOY commissioned a series of busts of their leading writers, such as Mika Waltari and Saima Harmaja.
