= Jukka Kajava =

Finnish theatre and television critic

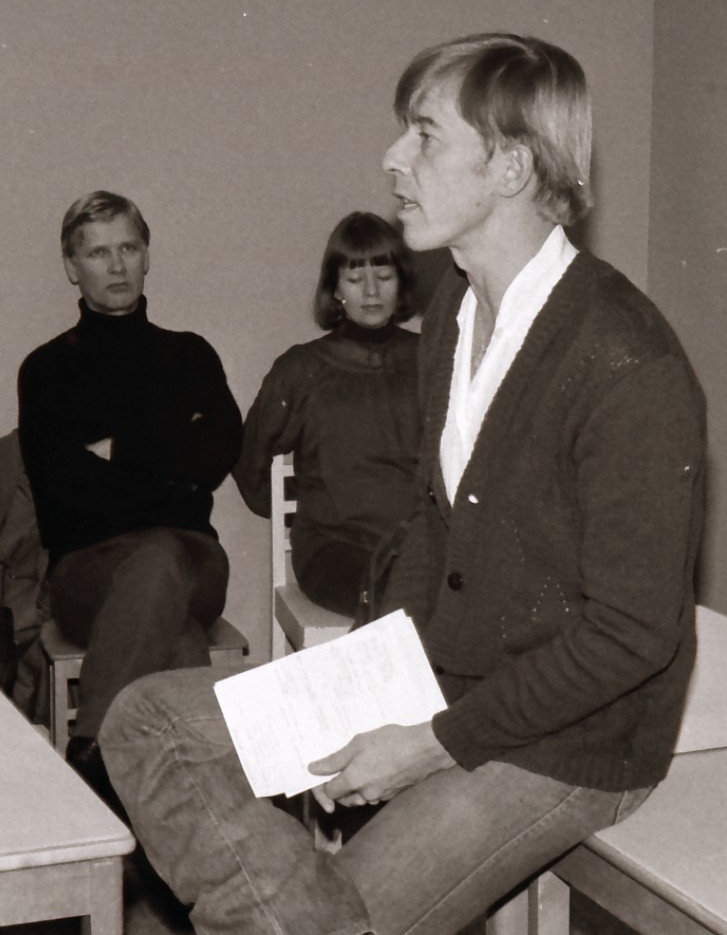
Jukka Kajava

Jukka Ilmari Kajava (February 25, 1943, Oulu – May 16, 2005, Berlin) was one of the most well known Finnish theatre and television critics.

Kajava worked for Helsingin Sanomat beginning in 1967, joining the paper's permanent staff in 1978. In addition to reviewing and criticizing, Kajava also directed theater and musical theater. The first production he directed was the operetta Iloinen Leski (Merry Widow), collaborating with Antti Einari Halonen, for the Åbo Svenska Teater in 1972. Kajava was also known as a spokesperson for quality culture for children and received a State Award for Children's Culture in the year 1985. He received the State Award for Critics in 1992.

Kajava was a critic held in esteem by many, whose reviews could notoriously consign a mediocre performance to total oblivion, but who often highlighted new and notable performances and performers from the Finnish general theatrical scene.
