= Moominvalley (disambiguation) =

Moominvalley is a fictional place in the tales by Finnish author Tove Jansson.

Moominvalley may also refer to:

- Moominvalley (TV series), a British-Finnish animated television series
  - Moominvalley (soundtrack)
- Moominvalley (museum), now known as Moomin Museum, in Tampere, Finland
- Moominvalley Park, in Hannō, Japan

== See also ==
- Moomin (disambiguation)
- Moomin World, a theme park in Naantali, Finland
