= Tapio Tapiovaara =

Finnish artist (1908–1982)

- Born: 7 November 1908; Sortavala, Grand Duchy of Finland
- Died: 16 October 1982 (aged 73); Leningrad, Soviet Union
- Occupation: Artist

Tapio Tapiovaara (7 November 1908 – 16 October 1982) was a Finnish artist.

== Biography ==
Tapio (Tapsa) Tapiovaara was born on 7 November 1908 in Sortavala in the Grand Duchy of Finland. He studied at the Art Industrial Central School from 1931 to 1935, at the Finnish Art Society Drawing School 1935–1936 and at the Free Painting School 1936-1939. He made study trips to Scandinavia, the Soviet Union, Czechoslovakia, India, China and Japan. He was an artist at WSOY 1942–1944, Kansancultuuri Oy 1944–1945, Kuvatyö Oy 1947–1951 and Seximo Ab 1951–1952. He worked as an independent artist as well as an illustrator and production designer in theatre and film. He held exhibitions both in Finland and abroad. According to Finland's National Biography, he was "one of the most significant and prolific embossing graphic artists of the 1930s and 1940s". In 1939–42, while Finland was at war, he was a lover of the artist and author Tove Jansson; they had been fellow-students at the Ateneum in Helsinki. The relationship was unsettled, but they remained friends after the war; she was pleased when he married Ulla Rainio, a ceramic artist, in 1945.

Tapiovaara was chairman of the Finland-Czechoslovak Society, Vice-President of the Finland-Soviet Union Society, Executive Board member of Eino Leinon Seura and sat on several Finnish cultural and artistic committees. He was an associate in numerous journals and created illustrations for works of the poets Edith Södergran, Elmer Diktonius, and Eino Leino, as well as for collections of Finnish folk tales. He made monumental paintings for the Seamen's Union in 1951, Helsinki's Kulturhuset in 1962, in Uleåborg 1964, Finland's building worker's house in 1965 and the Åland Stock Bank. He became an honorary member of the Prague Friendship Institute in 1964 and was awarded the Pro Finlandia Medal in 1972. He died on 16 October 1982 in Leningrad.

== Awards ==
- Pro Finlandia Medal of Finland's Lions Order, 6 December 1972
- The People's Friendship Order, 1978
- Czechoslovakia's Friendship Order, 7 November 1978
- Freedom Medal 1st Class
- Freedom Medal 2nd Class
