= Tove Jansson =

Finland-Swedish writer and illustrator (1914–2001)

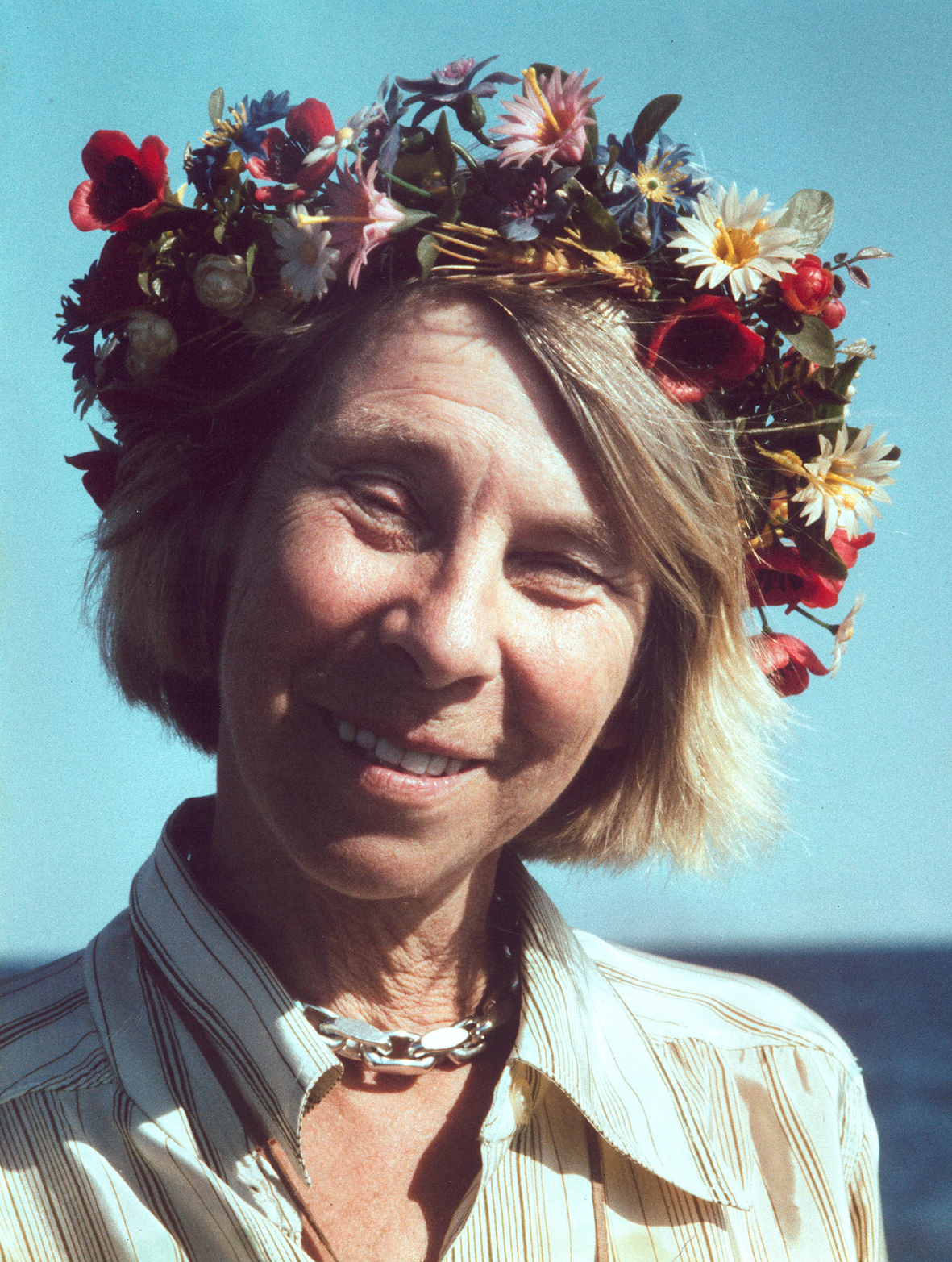
- c. 1970
- Born: Tove Marika Jansson; 9 August 1914; Helsinki, Grand Duchy of Finland, Russian Empire
- Died: 27 June 2001 (aged 86); Helsinki, Finland
- Occupations: Artist, writer
- Partner: Tuulikki Pietilä
- Parent(s): Viktor Jansson; Signe Hammarsten-Jansson
- Relatives: Per Olov Jansson (brother); Lars Jansson (brother); Einar Hammarsten (uncle); Sophia Jansson (niece)
- Writing career
- Language: Swedish
- Notable works: The Moomins; The Summer Book
- Notable awards: Hans Christian Andersen Award; 1966; Selma Lagerlöf Prize; 1992 and many others

Tove Marika Jansson (Finland Swedish: [ˈtuːve ˈjɑːnsːon]; 9 August 1914 – 27 June 2001) was a Finland-Swedish author, novelist and comic strip author, painter and illustrator. Brought up by artistic parents, her mother an illustrator and postage stamp designer, her father a sculptor, Jansson studied art from 1930 to 1938 in Helsinki, Stockholm, and Paris. She held her first solo art exhibition in 1943. Over the same period, she penned short stories and articles for publication, and subsequently drew illustrations for book covers, advertisements, and postcards. She continued her work as an artist and writer for the rest of her life. Her visible relationship with artist Tuulikki Pietilä, which lasted until Jansson's death, has made Jansson a respected queer icon.

Jansson wrote the Moomin novel series for children, starting with the 1945 The Moomins and the Great Flood. The following two books, Comet in Moominland and Finn Family Moomintroll, published in 1946 and 1948 respectively, were highly successful, and sales of the first book increased correspondingly. For her work as a children's author she received the Hans Christian Andersen Medal in 1966; among her many later awards was the Selma Lagerlöf Prize in 1992. Her Moomin stories have been adapted for the theatre, the cinema, and as an opera.

She held a solo exhibition of paintings in 1955, and five more between 1960 and 1970. She carried out several commissions for murals in public buildings around Finland between 1945 and 1984. She created the illustrations both for her own books and for editions of classics including Alice's Adventures in Wonderland and The Hobbit.

Starting with the semi-autobiographical Bildhuggarens dotter (The Sculptor's Daughter) in 1968, Jansson wrote six novels, including the admired Sommarboken (The Summer Book), and five short story collections for adults.

== Early life ==
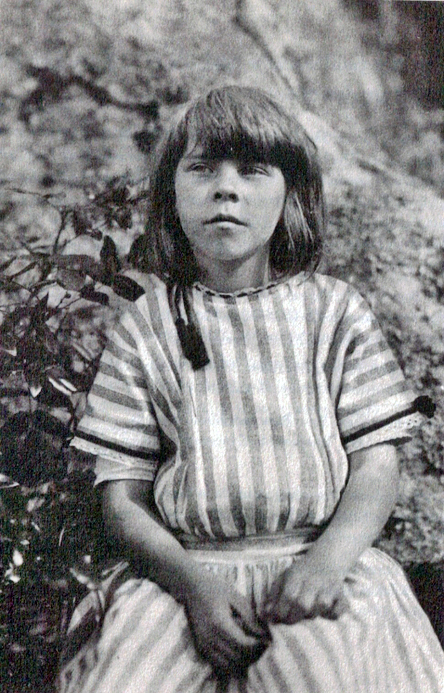
Jansson in 1923

Tove Jansson was born in Helsinki, in the Grand Duchy of Finland, an autonomous state within the Russian Empire at the time. Her family, part of the Swedish-speaking minority of Finland, was an artistic one: her father, Viktor Jansson, was a sculptor, and her mother, Signe Hammarsten-Jansson, was a Swedish-born graphic designer responsible for many of Finland's postage stamps, and an illustrator. Tove's siblings became artists too: Per Olov Jansson became a photographer and Lars Jansson an author and cartoonist. Their home was in Helsinki, but the family spent their summers in a rented cottage on one of the islands of Pellinki near Porvoo, 50 km (31 miles) east of Helsinki. The Söderskär Lighthouse island off Porvoo in the Gulf of Finland may have helped to inspire her later books, such as Moominpappa at Sea.

Jansson went to Finland's first co-educational school, Läroverket för gossar och flickor in Helsinki. She then studied at Konstfack (University College of Arts, Crafts and Design), in Stockholm in 1930–1933, the Graphic School of the Finnish Academy of Fine Arts in 1933–1937, and finally at L'École d'Adrien Holy and L'École des Beaux-Arts in Paris in 1938. Her first solo exhibition was held in 1943.

At age 14, Jansson wrote and illustrated her first picture book Sara och Pelle och näckens bläckfiskar (Sara and Pelle and Neptune's Children). It was not published until 1933. She sold drawings that were published in magazines in the 1920s.

In the 1930s Jansson made several trips to other European countries. She drew from these for her illustrated short stories and articles, which were published in magazines, periodicals and daily papers. During this period, Jansson designed many book covers, adverts and postcards. Following her mother's example, she drew illustrations for Garm, a Finnish-Swedish political and satirical magazine.

== Work ==
=== Moomins ===
Cover of Finn Family Moomintroll, showing, from left, Moomintroll and the Snorkmaiden, Moominpappa, Sniff, the Hattifatteners, the Groke, Thingumy and Bob, and Snufkin

Jansson is principally known as the author of the Moomin books. Jansson created the Moomintrolls, a family who are white, round and smooth in appearance, with large snouts that make them vaguely resemble hippopotamuses. She first drew a deliberately ugly creature as a caricature of Immanuel Kant, the philosopher; a kinder version became the Moomintroll. The first book, The Moomins and the Great Flood, was published in 1945. Although the primary characters are Moominmamma and Moomintroll, most of the principal characters of later stories were only introduced in the next book, so The Moomins and the Great Flood is frequently considered a forerunner to the main series. The book was not a success, but the third book, Finn Family Moomintroll (Note: The original title of Finn Family Moomintroll is Trollkarlens hatt, which would literally be The Magician's Hat in English.) (1948), made Jansson famous.

The themes of the Moomin books changed as time went by. The first books, written starting during the Second World War, up to Moominland Midwinter (1957), are adventure stories that include floods, comets and supernatural events. The Moomins and the Great Flood deals with Moominmamma and Moomintroll's flight through a dark and scary forest, where they encounter various dangers. In Comet in Moominland, a comet nearly destroys the Moominvalley. Some critics have considered this an allegory to nuclear weapons. Finn Family Moomintroll deals with adventures brought on by the discovery of a magician's hat. The Exploits of Moominpappa (1950) tells the story of Moominpappa's adventurous youth and cheerfully parodies the genre of memoir. Finally, Moominsummer Madness (1955) is set in a theatre: the Moomins explore the empty building and perform Moominpappa's melodrama.

Moominland Midwinter marks a turning point in the series. Jansson described it as a book about “what it is like when things get difficult”: the story focuses on Moomintroll, who wakes up in the middle of the winter (Moomins hibernate from November to April), and has to cope with the strange and unfriendly world he finds. The short story collection Tales from Moominvalley (1962) and the novels Moominpappa at Sea (1965) and Moominvalley in November (1970) are serious and psychologically searching books, far removed from the light-heartedness and cheerful humor of Finn Family Moomintroll. Moominvalley in November, in which the Moomin family themselves never appear, is especially sombre in tone, possibly in consequence of the death of Jansson's mother during the year that it was written. Because of this, it has been described as being a "textbook on letting go, being a mature orphan, existing spiritually alone". Following this book, Jansson stated that she "couldn't go back and find that happy Moominvalley again" and so decided to stop writing the Moomin books.

In addition to the Moomin novels and short stories, Tove Jansson wrote and illustrated four picture books: The Book about Moomin, Mymble and Little My (1952), Who will Comfort Toffle? (1960), The Dangerous Journey (1977) and An Unwanted Guest (1980). As the Moomins' fame grew, two of the original novels, Comet in Moominland and The Exploits of Moominpappa, were revised (Note: The first edition (1946) of Comet in Moominland echoed the threat to Finland of a Soviet takeover at that time. The 1956 and 1968 editions were edited as the threats changed. By 1968, that was nuclear war.) by Jansson and republished.

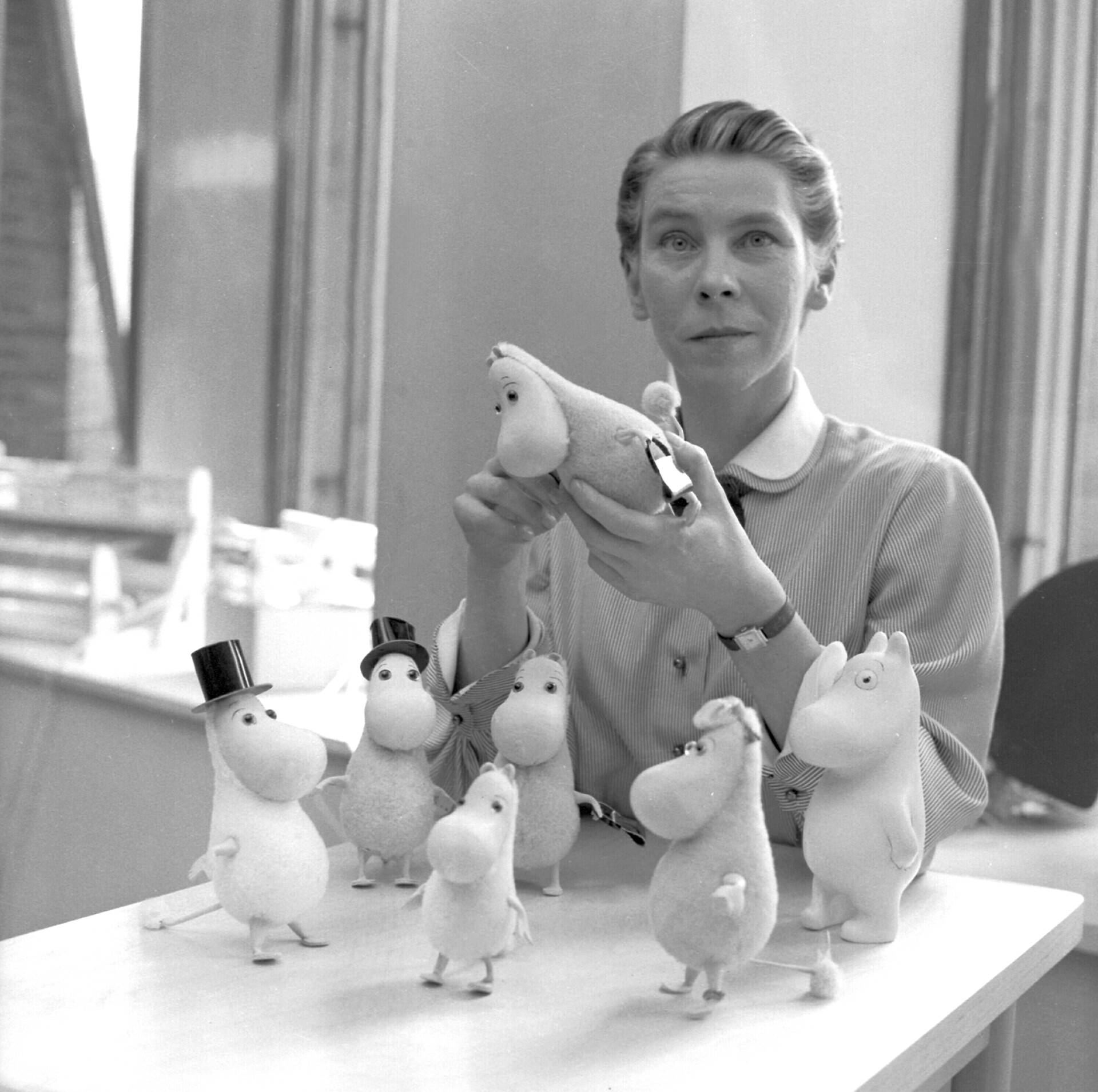
Jansson in 1956 with Moomintroll dolls made by Atelier Fauni

Critics have interpreted several of the Moomin characters as being inspired by real people, especially members of the author's family and close friends, and Jansson spoke in interviews about the backgrounds of, and possible models for, her characters. Tuulikki Pietilä, Jansson's partner, inspired the character Too-Ticky in Moominland Midwinter, while Moomintroll and Little My have been seen as psychological self-portraits of the artist. The inseparable pair known in English translations as Thingumy and Bob were in Swedish Tofslan and Vifslan: the pet names of Tove Jansson and her theatre director lover Vivica Bandler, a subtlety lost in translation. Snufkin is based on Jansson's friend, the journalist and member of parliament Atos Wirtanen.

The Moomins relate strongly to Jansson's own family – they were bohemian and lived close to nature. Jansson remained close to her mother until her mother's death in 1970; even after Tove had become an adult, the two often travelled together, and during her final years Signe lived with Tove part-time. Moominpappa and Moominmamma are often seen as portraits of Jansson's parents.

=== Other writing ===
Jansson's first foray outside children's literature was Bildhuggarens dotter (Sculptor's Daughter), a semi-autobiographical novel published in 1968. She went on to write five more novels for adults, including Sommarboken (The Summer Book) and five collections of short stories. The Summer Book is the best known of her adult fiction; it describes the summer stay on an island of a young girl and her grandmother. The girl is modelled on her niece, Sophia Jansson; the girl's father on Sophia's father, Lars Jansson; and the grandmother on Tove's mother Signe. The Summer Book was adapted into a 2024 film of the same name, starring Glenn Close as the grandmother.

=== Wartime satire in Garm magazine ===
Cover of Garm magazine, October 1944, lampooning Adolf Hitler as "self-important and comic"

Tove Jansson worked as an illustrator and cartoonist for the Swedish-language satirical magazine Garm from 1929 to 1953, when the magazine ceased production. One of her political cartoons achieved brief international fame: she drew Adolf Hitler as a crying baby in diapers, surrounded by Neville Chamberlain and other great European leaders, who tried to calm the baby down by giving it slices of cake – Austria, Poland, Czechoslovakia, etc. In the Second World War (when Finland fought against the Soviet Union, part of the time cooperating with Nazi Germany), her cover illustrations for Garm lampooned both Hitler and Joseph Stalin: in one, Stalin draws his sword from his impressively long scabbard, only to find it absurdly short; in another, multiple Hitlers ransack a house, carrying away food and artworks. In The Spectator's view, Jansson made both "Hitler and Stalin appear as preposterous little figures, self-important and comic".

=== Comic strip artist ===
Her earliest comic strips were created for productions including Lunkentus (Prickinas och Fabians äventyr, 1929), Vårbrodd (Fotbollen som Flög till Himlen', 1930), and Allas Krönika (Palle och Göran gå till sjöss, 1933).

The figure of the Moomintroll appeared first in Jansson's political cartoons, where it was used as a signature character near the artist's name. This "Proto-Moomin", then called Snork (in Swedish) or Niisku (in Finnish), was thin and ugly, with a long, narrow nose and devilish tail. Jansson said that she had designed the Moomins in her youth: after she lost a philosophical quarrel about Immanuel Kant with one of her brothers, she drew "the ugliest creature imaginable" on the wall of their outhouse and wrote under it "Kant". This Moomin later gained weight and a more pleasant appearance, but in the first Moomin book The Moomins and the Great Flood (originally Småtrollen och den stora översvämningen), the Immanuel-Kant-Moomin is still perceptible. The name Moomin comes from Tove Jansson's uncle, Einar Hammarsten: when she was studying in Stockholm and living with her Swedish relatives, her uncle tried to stop her pilfering food by telling her that a "Moomintroll" lived in the kitchen closet and breathed cold air down people's necks.

In 1952, after Comet in Moominland and Finn Family Moomintroll had been translated into English, a British newspaper man, Charles Sutton, asked if Tove Jansson would be interested in drawing comic strips about the Moomins. Jansson accepted the offer. The comic strip Moomintroll started in the London Evening News, which had a circulation of 12 million at that time, making it the world's largest daily newspaper. The strip spread to hundreds of other newspapers in 12 countries.

=== Painter and illustrator ===
==== Paintings ====
Although she became known first and foremost as an author, Tove Jansson considered her careers as author and painter to be of equal importance. She painted throughout her life. She exhibited during the 1930s and early 1940s, holding her first solo exhibition in 1943. Despite generally positive reviews, criticism induced Jansson to refine her style; her 1955 solo exhibition was simpler in detail and content. Between 1960 and 1970 she held five more solo exhibitions. The National Biography of Finland describes Jansson as going "against the conventional image of an artist with her unusually even balance between visual art and writing."

==== Murals ====
Jansson and the fresco expert Niilo Suihko at work on the City Celebration fresco in Helsinki City Hall in 1947

Throughout her career, Jansson created a series of commissioned murals and public works which may still be viewed in their original locations, including:

- The canteen at the Strömberg factory at Pitäjänmäki, Helsinki (1945)
- A pair of frescos for the cellar restaurant of Helsinki City Hall (1947), where Jansson learnt the technique from the fresco expert Niilo Suihko (Note: Now relocated to the Swedish Workers' Institute, Helsinki, still on public display.)
- The Aurora Children's Hospital in Helsinki
- The Seurahuone hotel at Hamina
- The Ten Virgins altarpiece in Teuva (Swedish: Östermark) Church (1954), her only church painting
- Fairy-tale murals in schools, including the kindergarten in Pori (1984)

==== Illustrations ====
Detail of Jansson's drawing of Smaug destroying Lake-town, a scene from a 1962 Swedish edition of The Hobbit. Her work helped to define how fantasy could be illustrated, but has been seen as unfashionably "expressive".

As well as illustrating her own books, Jansson illustrated Swedish translations of classics such as Lewis Carroll's The Hunting of the Snark and Alice's Adventures in Wonderland, at the invitation of Bonniers's Åke Runnquist; he became her publisher and they exchanged letters for many years.

She created a set of illustrations for the 1962 Swedish edition of J. R. R. Tolkien's 1937 children's book The Hobbit, (Note: Another of her illustrations for The Hobbit can be seen in the Gollum article; she made the monster very large, before Tolkien stated that it was small.) at the request of the Swedish children's author Astrid Lindgren. The scholar of literature Björn Sundmark states that Jansson's work helped to define how Tolkien's Middle-earth fantasy could be depicted visually. The edition with her illustrations was not reprinted for many years, (Note: It was eventually reprinted in 1994 in the same 24 cm format by Rabén Prisma, ISBN 978-9-15182-727-8.) even though reviewers and "Tolkienists" liked Jansson's "expressive" images. Sundmark suggests that the reason was that in the 1960s, a new, more realistic style became the norm for fantasy art.

=== Adaptations ===
Several stage productions have been made from Jansson's Moomin series, including a number that Jansson herself was involved in. The earliest was a 1949 version of Comet in Moominland, titled Mumintrollet och kometen, performed at Åbo Svenska Teater. In the early 1950s, Jansson collaborated on Moomin-themed children's plays with Vivica Bandler. In 1952, Jansson designed stage settings and dresses for Pessi and Illusia, a ballet by Ahti Sonninen which was performed at the Finnish National Opera. By 1958, Jansson began to become directly involved in theater as Lilla Teater produced Troll i kulisserna (Troll in the wings), a play with lyrics by Jansson and music composed by Erna Tauro. The production was a success, despite the actors' difficulties speaking through their bulbous "Moominsnouts", and later performances were held in Sweden and Norway.

In 1974 the first Moomin opera was produced, with music composed by Ilkka Kuusisto. Other stage adaptations include the play Hemulen som älskade tystnad (1974–75). Her work was also adapted into several television dramas in the 1970s, including Mumintrollen (1969), Orm i salongen (1974), Fönstret (1976), Kvinnan som lånade minnen (1977), and Filifjonkan som trodde på katastrofer (1978).

The Moomintrolls have been adapted to media including television animations such as the 1990 Moomin series, and feature films.

== Personal life ==
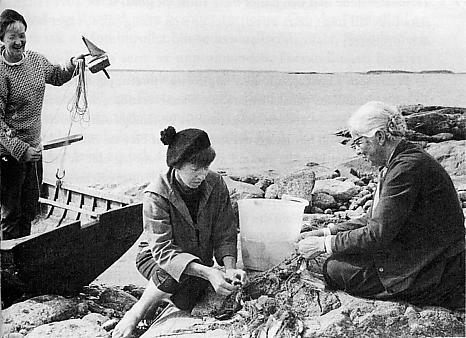
Tuulikki Pietilä, Tove Jansson and her mother Signe at Klovharu, the island in the Porvoo archipelago where the Janssons had a summer house, 1958

Jansson had several male lovers, including the artists Sam Vanni and Tapio "Tapsa" Tapiovaara, and the political philosopher Atos Wirtanen; she briefly became engaged to Wirtanen. He was the inspiration for the Moomin character Snufkin. However, she eventually "went over to the spook side", as she is said to have put it —a coded expression for homosexuality—and developed a secret love affair with the married theater director Vivica Bandler.

In 1956, Jansson met her lifelong partner, Tuulikki Pietilä, known as "Tooti". In Helsinki they lived apart but nearby, so they could meet unnoticed, but this did not resolve the problem that Jansson's mother often came to stay. (Note: Same-sex marriage in Finland was legalized in 2017.) They found a partial solution by building a house on a small island in the Gulf of Finland, and staying there for the summer. Jansson's and Pietilä's travels and summers spent together on the Klovharu island in Pellinki have been captured on several hours of film, shot by Pietilä. Several documentaries have been made of this footage, including Haru, yksinäinen saari (Haru, the lonely island) (1998) and Tove ja Tooti Euroopassa (Tove and Tooti in Europe) (2004). The character Too-ticky, described by Sue Prideaux as "a wild-haired artistic troll in a Breton sweater and a beret", was inspired by Pietilä.

Jansson died on 27 June 2001 at the age of 86. She is buried at the Hietaniemi Cemetery in Helsinki.

== Cultural legacy ==
The first major retrospective exhibition of Jansson's art in the United Kingdom was held at the Dulwich Picture Gallery, 2017–2018.

=== Documentaries and exhibitions ===
In 1968, Swedish public TV broadcaster SVT made a documentary about Tove called Moomins and the Sea (39 min.). Jansson's books, originally written in Swedish, have been translated into 45 languages. The Moomin Museum in Tampere displays much of Jansson's work on the Moomins. There are Moomin theme parks such as Moomin World in Naantali, and Metsä in Hannō, Japan. In 2012, the BBC broadcast a one-hour documentary on Jansson, Moominland Tales: The Life of Tove Jansson.

In March 2014, the Ateneum Art Museum opened a major centenary exhibition showcasing Jansson's works as an artist, an illustrator, a political caricaturist and the creator of the Moomins. The exhibition drew nearly 300,000 visitors in six months. After Helsinki the exhibition embarked on a tour in Japan to visit five Japanese museums.

In January 2016, a permanent Tove Jansson exhibition of murals, an oil painting, photographs and sketches opened at the Helsinki Art Museum. The two murals in the exhibition, Party in the Countryside and Party in the City were created for Helsinki City Hall's Kaupunginkellari restaurant. From June 2017 to September 2017, an exhibition of Jansson's paintings, illustrations, and cartoons was held in Kunstforeningen Gammel Strand in Copenhagen in collaboration with Ateneum in Helsinki. The exhibition then moved from October 2017 to January 2018 to the Dulwich Picture Gallery in London. This was the first major retrospective exhibition of her work in the United Kingdom.

A biopic, titled Tove, directed by Zaida Bergroth was released in October 2020.

=== Commemorations ===
Jansson was selected as the main motif in the 2004 minting of a Finnish commemorative coin, the €10 Tove Jansson and Finnish Children's Culture commemorative coin. The obverse depicts a combination of her portrait and the skyline, an artist's palette, a crescent and a sailing boat. The reverse features three Moomin characters. In 2014 she was again featured on a commemorative coin, this time of €20, becoming the only person other than the former Finnish president Urho Kekkonen to be granted two such coins. She was featured on a €2 commemorative coin that entered general circulation in June 2014. Since 1988, Finland's Post has released several postage stamp sets and one postal card with Moomin motifs. In 2014, Jansson was featured on a Finnish stamp set. In 2014 the City of Helsinki honoured Jansson by renaming a park near her childhood home in Katajanokka "Tove Jansson's Park". (Note: Finnish: Tove Janssonin puisto, Swedish: Tove Janssons park.) The city has in addition placed a memorial plaque to Jansson at her home in Ullanlinnankatu, Helsinki.

When an animated series, Moominvalley was broadcast in 2019, the journalist Rhianna Pratchett wrote an article about the impact Jansson had had on her father, the fantasy author Terry Pratchett; he called Jansson one of the greatest children's writers ever, and credited her writing as one of the reasons he became an author.

== Moomin works ==
=== The Moomin books ===
- Småtrollen och den stora översvämningen (1945, The Moomins and the Great Flood)
- Kometjakten (1946, Comet in Moominland), reworked as Kometen kommer (1968)
- Trollkarlens hatt (1948, Finn Family Moomintroll; in some editions The Happy Moomins)
- Muminpappans bravader (1950, The Exploits of Moominpappa), reworked as Muminpappans memoarer (1968)
- Farlig midsommar (1954, Moominsummer Madness)
- Trollvinter (1957, Moominland Midwinter)
- Pappan och havet (1965, Moominpappa at Sea)
- Sent i november (1970, Moominvalley in November)

=== Short story collections ===
- Det osynliga barnet och andra berättelser (1962, lit. "The invisible child and other tales", translated as Tales from Moominvalley)

=== Picture books ===
- Hur gick det sen? (1952, lit. "Then what happened?", translated as The Book about Moomin, Mymble and Little My)
- Vem ska trösta Knyttet? (1960, Who Will Comfort Toffle?)
- Den farliga resan (1977, The Dangerous Journey)
- Skurken i Muminhuset (1980, Villain in the Moominhouse)
- Visor från Mumindalen (1993, Songs From Moominvalley; songbook. With Lars Jansson and Erna Tauro)

=== Comic strips ===
The Moomin comic strips were initially serialised in newspapers. The early Ny Tid strips were republished in the book Jorden går under (The World is Ending). The Evening News strips were collected into a series of books:

- Mumin, Books 1–7 (1977–1981, Moomin; Books 3–7 with Lars Jansson) (Books 1–6 released in English).

== Adult fiction ==
=== Novels ===
- Sommarboken (1972, The Summer Book)
- Solstaden (1974, Sun City)
- Den ärliga bedragaren (1982, The True Deceiver)
- Stenåkern (1984, The Field of Stones)
- Rent spel (1989, Fair Play)

=== Short story collections ===
- Bildhuggarens dotter (1968, The Sculptor's Daughter) (semi-autobiographical)
- Lyssnerskan (1971, The Listener)
- Dockskåpet och andra berättelser (1978, lit. "The Doll's House and Other Stories", translated as Art in Nature)
- Resa med lätt bagage (1987, Travelling Light)
- Brev från Klara och andra berättelser (1991, Letters from Klara)
- Meddelande. Noveller i urval 1971–1997 (1998 compilation, Messages: Selected Stories 1971–1997)
- A Winter Book (2006). Introduced by Ali Smith, with stories selected from Sculptor's Daughter, Messages, The Listener, Letters from Klara, and Travelling Light.
- The Woman Who Borrowed Memories (New York Review Books, 2014). Selections from The Listener, The Doll's House and Other Stories, Travelling Light, Letters from Klara, and Messages.

=== Autobiographical ===
- Anteckningar från en ö (1993, Notes from an Island; autobiography; illustrated by Tuulikki Pietilä)
- Letters from Tove (2019) (personal letters, edited by Boel Westin and Helen Svensson)

=== Miscellaneous ===
- Sara och Pelle och näckens bläckfiskar (under the pseudonym of Vera Haij, 1933, Sara and Pelle and the Octopuses of the Water Sprite)
- Vi. En romantisk bok för älskande (1965; illustrated by Signe Hammarsten-Jansson)

== Awards ==
- Ducat Prize of the Finnish Art Society for young artists (1939, 1953)
- Svenska Dagbladet Prize for Finland-Swedish literature (1952)
- Nils Holgersson Plaque for The Book about Moomin, Mymble and Little My (1953)
- Elsa Beskow Plaque and Rudolf Koivu Prize for Moominland Midwinter (1958)
- Swedish Culture Society Prize (1958)
- Stockholms-Tidningen Culture Prize (1963)
- Finnish State Prize for Literature (1963)
- Anni Swan Medal for Tales from Moominvalley (1964)
- Längman Prize (1965)
- Hans Christian Andersen Award (gold medal, 1966)
- Expressen Heffaklumpen Prize (with Astrid Lindgren) (1970)
- Prize of the Swedish Literature Society in Finland (1971)
- Award for State Literature (1963, 1971 and 1982)
- Swedish Academy Finland Prize (1972)
- Order of the Smile (1975)
- Nominated for the Nobel Prize in Literature (1975).
- Pro Finlandia Medal (1976)
- Literature Promotion Foundation (Stiftelsen litteraturfrämjandet) Large Prize (1977)
- Topelius Prize (1978)
- Austrian State Prize (1978)
- Åbo Akademi University, Honorary Doctorate of Philosophy (1978)
- Swedish Culture Foundation Honorary Award (1983)
- The Finnish Cultural Award (1990)
- Selma Lagerlöf Prize (1992)
- The Finland Art Prize (1993)
- Mercuri International bronze medal (1994)
- The Swedish Academy Award (1994)
- Åbo Akademi University Honorary Professor (1995)
- The American-Scandinavian Foundation Honorary Cultural Award (1996)
- WSOY Literary Foundation Award (1999)
- Le Prix de l'Office Chrétien du Livre
- The Will Eisner Award Hall of Fame (2016)

== Sources ==
- Gravett, Paul (2022). Tove Jansson. The Illustrators. Thames & Hudson. ISBN 978-0-500-09433-4.
- Karjalainen, Tuula (2016) [2013]. Tove Jansson: Work and Love. Penguin Books. ISBN 978-0-141-97882-6.
- Westin, Boel (2014). Tove Jansson Life, Art, Words: The Authorised Biography. Translated by Mazzarella, Silvester. Sort of Books. ISBN 978-1-908745-45-3.
