= Moomin theme parks and displays =

The popularity of the Finland-Swedish author Tove Jansson's Moomin books has led to the creation of Moomin theme parks and displays in cities in several countries.

== Moomin World ==
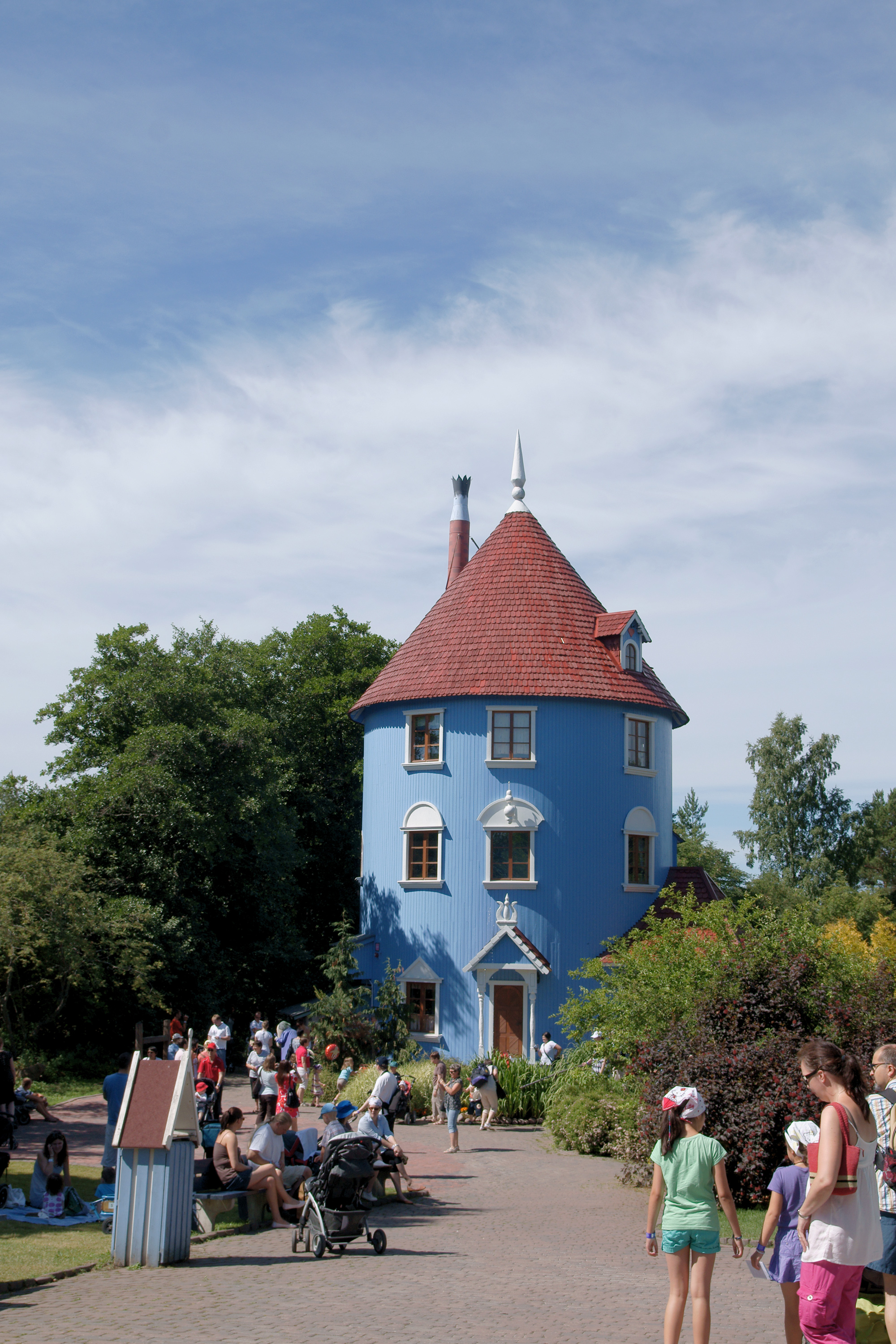
Moomin House in Moomin World, Naantali, Finland

Moomin World (Muumimaailma in Finnish, Muminvärlden in Swedish) is the Moomin Theme Park especially for children. Moomin World is located on the island of Kailo beside the old town of Naantali, near the city of Turku in Western Finland.

The blueberry-coloured Moomin House is the main attraction; tourists are allowed to freely visit all five stories. It is also possible to see the Hemulen's yellow house, Moominmama's kitchen, the Fire Station, Snufkin's Camp, Moominpappa's boat, etc. Visitors may also meet Moomin characters there. Moomin World opens for the Summer season.

== Moomin Ice Cave ==
On December 26, 2020, the underground Moomin Ice Cave theme park was opened 30 meters underneath the Spa Hotel Vesileppis in Leppävirta (56 kilometres (35 mi) south of Kuopio). The Moomin Ice Cave includes Moomin-themed ice sculptures, downhill skiing and other activities for families with children.

== Tampere Art Museum ==
The Moominvalley of the Tampere Art Museum is a museum devoted to the original works of Tove Jansson. It contains around 2,000 works. The museum is based on the Moomin books and has many original Moomin illustrations by Tove Jansson. The gem of the collection is a blue five-storey model of the Moominhouse, which had Tove Jansson as one of its builders. As a birthday present, the 20-year-old museum received a soundscape work based on the works of Tove Jansson, called Musicscapes from Moominvalley.

== Interactive playroom ==
An interactive playroom about the Moomins was located at Scandinavia House, New York City, from November 11, 2006, till March 31, 2007.

== Akebono Children's Forest Park ==
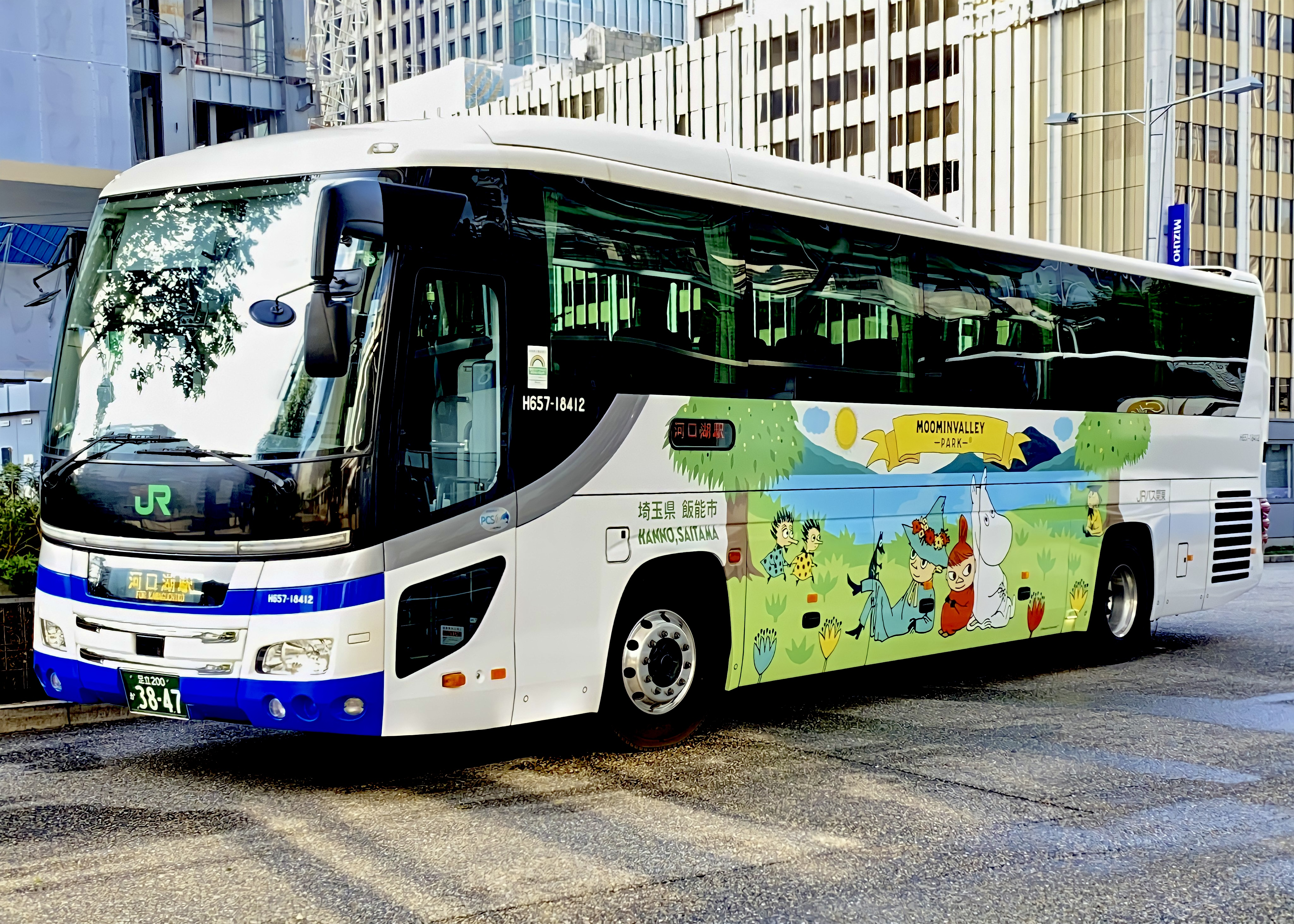
Japanese bus going to MoominValley Park

Akebono Children's Forest Park (あけぼの子どもの森公園, Akebono Kodomo no Mori Kōen), also called "Moomin Valley", is a Moomin themed park for children in Hannō, Saitama in Japan that opened in July, 1997. Tove Jansson had already in the 1970s given her personal permission to the city of Hannō to build a small Moomin-themed playground there.

== Metsä ==
First announced in 2013, a new Moomin theme park, Metsä, was opened in March 2019 at Lake Miyazawa, Hannō. There are two zones: the free Metsä Village area, comprising lakefront restaurants and shops set among natural activities, and the Moominvalley Park section offering attractions like Moominhouse and an art museum.

The theme park has become very popular, with more than one million visitors during the first three months in 2019.

== Moomin shops ==
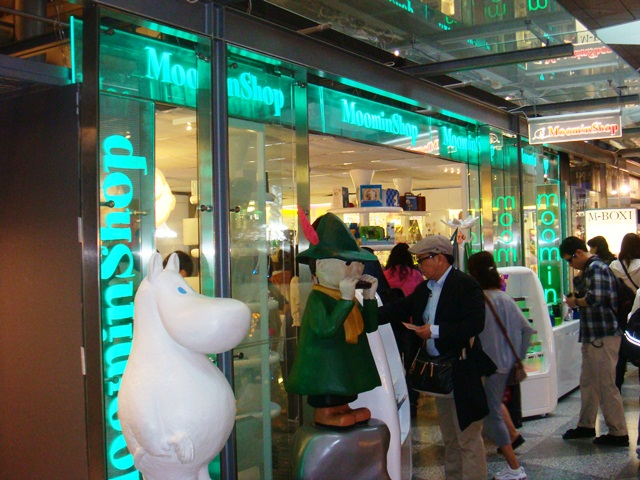
Moomin Shop at Helsinki Airport

As of January 2019, there are 20 Moomin Shops around the world, offering an extensive range of Moomin-themed goods. Finland, home of the Moomins, has three stores. There are two stores in the UK, one in the US, six in Japan. China and Hong Kong each have one store. There are three in South Korea and three in Thailand. One store exists in Kraków, Poland.

== Moomin Cafes ==
As of January 2018, there are 15 themed Moomin Cafes around the world – Finland, Japan, Hong Kong, Thailand, South Korea and Taiwan – allowing diners to immerse themselves in the Moomin world. Diners can enjoy Moomin-inspired meals sitting at tables with larger-than-life plush versions of Moomin characters.
