= Pellinki =

Island in Porvoo, Finland

Coordinates: 60°13′N 025°52′E

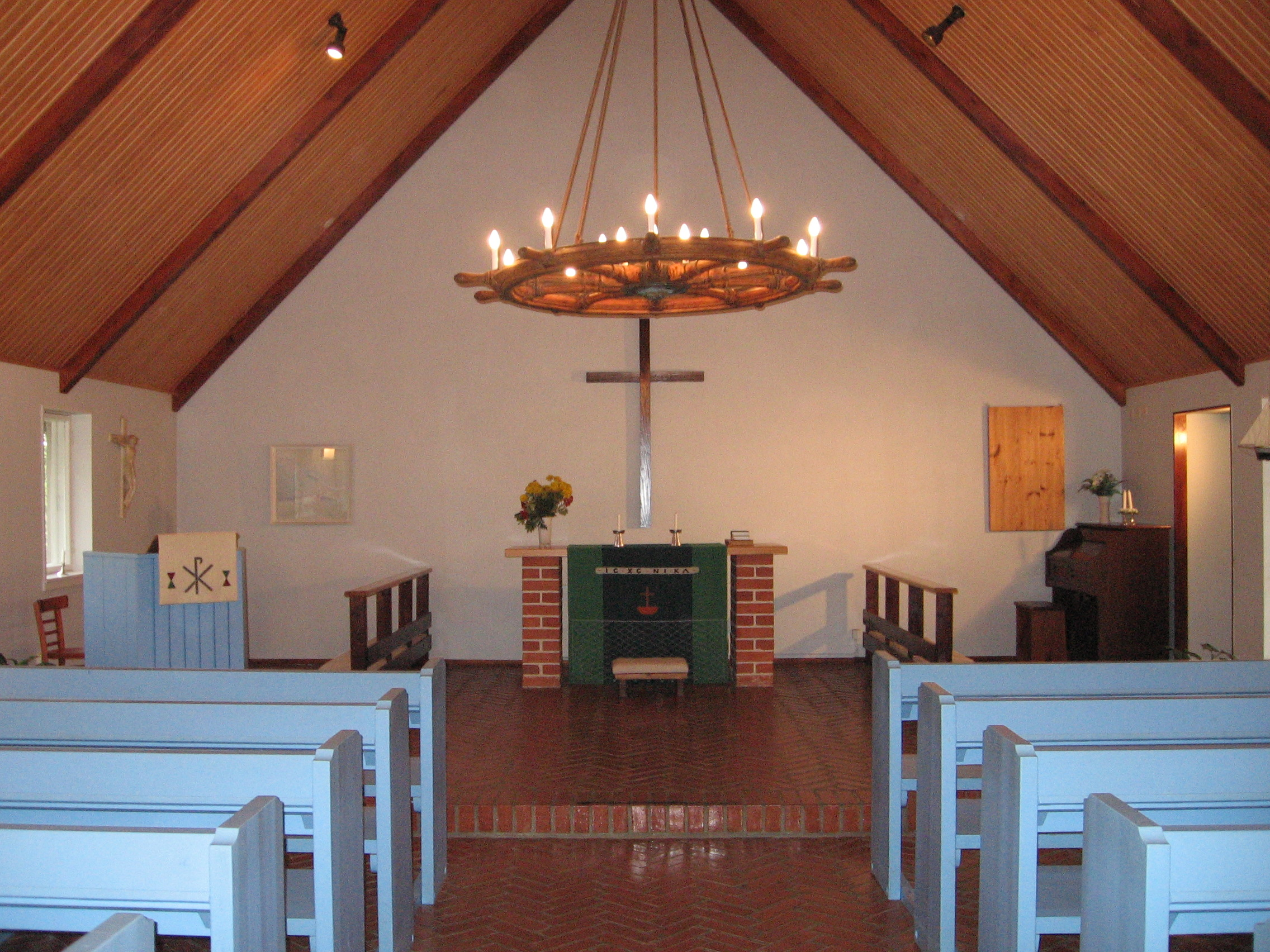
St. Olaf's chapel from inside

Pellinki (Finnish: [ˈpelːiŋki]; Swedish: Pellinge, Finland Swedish: [ˈpelːiŋe]) is an island community in Finland made up of several small islands, the main ones linked by bridges. It is located 80 km east of the capital Helsinki, and 30 km south of the town of Porvoo (Swedish: Borgå). It is administered as part of the municipality of Porvoo.

== Description ==
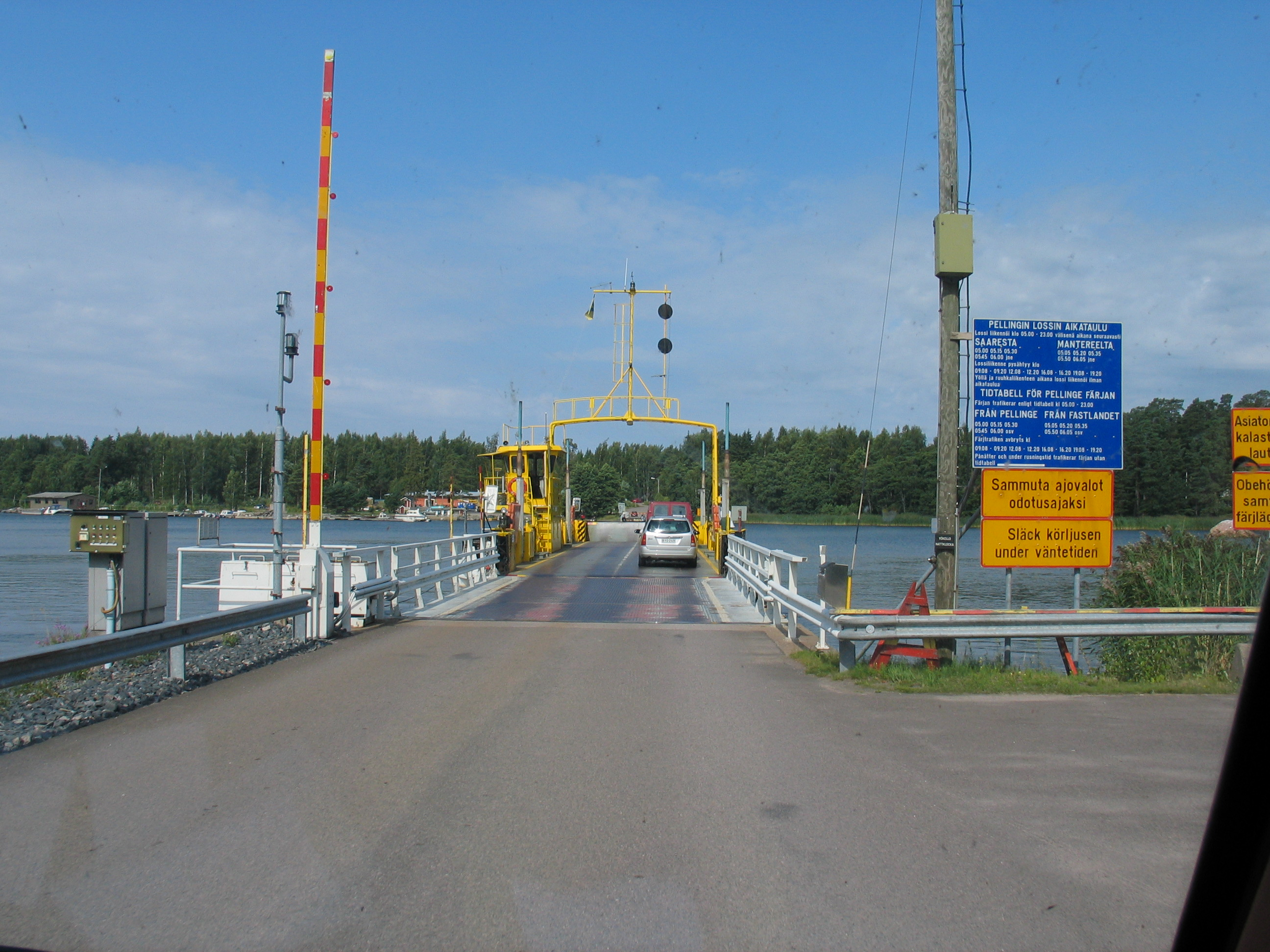
A ferry connection from Porvoo to Pellinge

Pellinge is accessible from the Finnish mainland via a small vehicle/pedestrian cable ferry from Tirmo.

Approximately 250 persons live on Pellinge; most of them speak Swedish. There is a voluntary fire brigade.

Pellinge has its own graveyard and a chapel dedicated to St. Olaf.

Traditional ways of life on Pellinge include fishing, boat building, and farming; more recently, tourism has become an important local industry.

== Tove Jansson ==
At a young age, the Finland-Swedish author and artist Tove Jansson and her family spent many of their summers in a rented cottage on Klovharun, one of the islands of Pellinki. As an adult, she spent her summers there with her life partner, Tuulikki Pietilä, describing her experiences in her book Notes from an Island.
