= Tito Colliander =

Finnish Eastern Orthodox Christian writer

Tito Fritiof Colliander
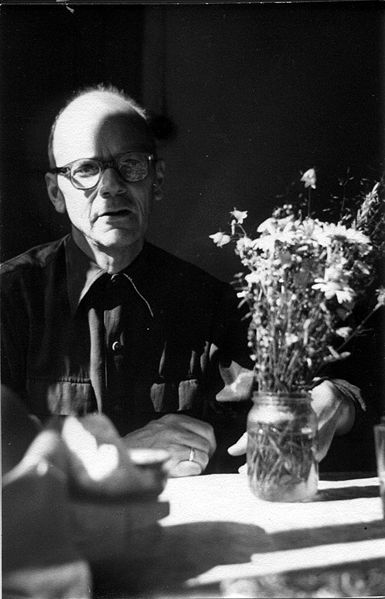
- Colliander in 1956
- Born: 10 February 1904; Saint Petersburg, Russian Empire
- Died: 21 May 1989 (aged 85); Helsinki, Finland
- Occupations: theologian, novelist, teacher
- Writing career
- Period: 1930–1989
- Genres: Romance, Memoir

Tito Fritiof Colliander (10 February 1904 – 21 May 1989) was a Finnish Eastern Orthodox Christian writer.

== Biography ==
Colliander was born in St. Petersburg, the son of Colonel Sigfried Joakim Colliander and his wife Dagmar Ilmatar Constance, née von Schoultz. Colliander received an artistic education at the Finnish Art Society's drawing school from 1921 to 1923, and worked as a drawing teacher at the Swedish Girls' School in Porvoo from 1923 to 1928. His wife, Ina Behrsen, whom he married in 1930, was also an artist, and his son Sergius became an Orthodox priest.

Beginning in the 1930s, Colliander published a number of novels and short stories that made him famous. His books were written under the strong influence of Dostoyevsky's frequent themes of guilt and searching for faith in the modern world. His novels Crusade (Korståget), Mercy (Förbarma dig) and others were translated into foreign languages. Colliander was one of the contributors of Garm, a Swedish language satirical magazine based in Helsinki.

Colliander and his wife Ina converted to Orthodoxy, and the writer attended the Orthodox seminary from 1949 to 1953. From 1950 to 1969, he was a teacher of the Orthodox religion in Helsinki's Swedish-speaking secondary schools. His most famous book, The Way of the Ascetics (Asketernas väg), was first published in Swedish. The English translation, The Way of the Ascetics, went through several editions. He also wrote a memoir of life in Tsarist Russia and Finland in a pre-war book about Ilya Repin.

He died on 21 May 1989 and is buried at the Orthodox cemetery in Helsinki near Lapinlahti.

== Awards and honours ==
Colliander received numerous awards for his literary work, including:

- State Prize for Literature (Valtion kirjallisuuspalkinto): 1935, 1937, 1959, 1964, 1970
- Lybeck Prize (Lybeckin palkinto): 1936, 1938
- Prize from the Society of Swedish Literature in Finland: 1949, 1965
- Honorary Prize from the Swedish Academy: 1969
- Honorary Doctor of Theology from Åbo Akademi University: 1968
- Tollander Prize (Tollanderin palkinto): 1974
- Prize from the Church of Finland (Suomen kirkon palkinto): 1976

== Selected works ==
- En vandrare (A Wanderer), 1930, short stories
- Korståget (The Crusade), 1937, novel
- Förbarma dig (Have Mercy), 1939, novel
- Dagen är (The Day Is), 1940, poems
- Ilja Repin. En konstnär från Ukraina (Ilya Repin: An Artist from Ukraine), 1942, biography
- Grottan (The Cave), 1942, novel
- Asketernas väg (The Way of the Ascetics), 1952
- Bevarat (Preserved), 1964, memoir
- Gripen (The Griffin), 1965, memoir
- Vidare (Further), 1967, memoir
- Nära (Near), 1971, memoir
- Måltid (Meal), 1973, memoir
- (with Pertti Hietanen) Nya Valamo (New Valamo), 1974, text for photo book
