= Moomin (disambiguation) =

The Moomins are characters in the books and comic strips of Tove Jansson.

Moomin or Moomins may also refer to:

- Moomin, or Moomintroll, the main character in Jansson's books and comic strips
- Moomin comic strips
- Moomin World, a theme park in Finland based on the Moomin franchise
- Moomin, Queensland, a locality in the Tablelands Region, Australia

== Television ==
- Moomin (1969 TV series), a 1969–1970 Japanese anime television series, based on the book and comic strip series
- Moomin (1990 TV series), a 1990–1991 Japanese-Dutch anime television series, based on the book and comic strip series
- New Moomin, a 1972 Japanese anime television series, the second, based on the book and comic strip series
- The Moomins (TV series), a 1977–1982 European stop motion children's television series broadcast in the UK on ITV, based on the book and comic strip series
- Moominvalley (TV series), also known as Moomin, a 2019–2024 British-Finnish animated television series

== People ==
- Moomin (singer) (born 1972), Japanese reggae singer
- Moomin Fuad, Maldivian filmmaker

== See also ==
- Mu'min, Arabic word for faithful Muslims
- Moominvalley (disambiguation)
