= Garm (magazine) =

Swedish language political and satirical magazine published in Finland (1923–1953)

- Categories: Satirical magazine; Political magazine
- Frequency: Monthly
- Founder: Henry Rein
- Founded: 1923
- Final issue: 1953
- Country: Finland
- Based in: Helsinki
- Language: Swedish

Garm was a monthly political and satirical magazine published in Helsinki, Finland. The magazine existed for thirty years from 1923 to 1953. The title of the magazine is a reference to a character in the Norse mythology, a monstrous hound which defended the entrance to Helheim, the Norse realm of the dead.

== History and profile ==
Garm was established in 1923 as a successor of Kerberos which was also a satirical magazine published in Finland. The founder was Henry Rein. The magazine was published in Helsinki on a monthly basis. It had a conservative political stance like its predecessor. However, unlike Kerberos Garm opposed both the nationalism in the form of true Finnishness and the extreme leftist politics. In addition, although Garm supported the Swedish language and culture in Finland, it did not call for the cooperation with Sweden. The magazine mocked both Communism and Nazism during World War II.

Garm's readers were mostly politicians, celebrities, and other leading figures. Tito Colliander and Jarl Hemmer were among the Garm contributors. One of the most significant contributors of Garm was Tove Jansson who started her career in the magazine as a cartoonist in 1929 when she was just fifteen. Tove Jansson's mother, Signe Hammarsten-Jansson, also worked at the magazine from its start in 1923. Over time the former became the magazine's chief illustrator. Some characters in her Moomin cartoon strips first appeared in the magazine. Jansson's political cartoons ridiculing Adolf Hitler and Josef Stalin published in Garm were censored by the Finnish authorities. Garm folded in 1953 when its founder Henry Rein died.
