= Moomin Museum =

Museum in Tampere, Finland

- Muumimuseo

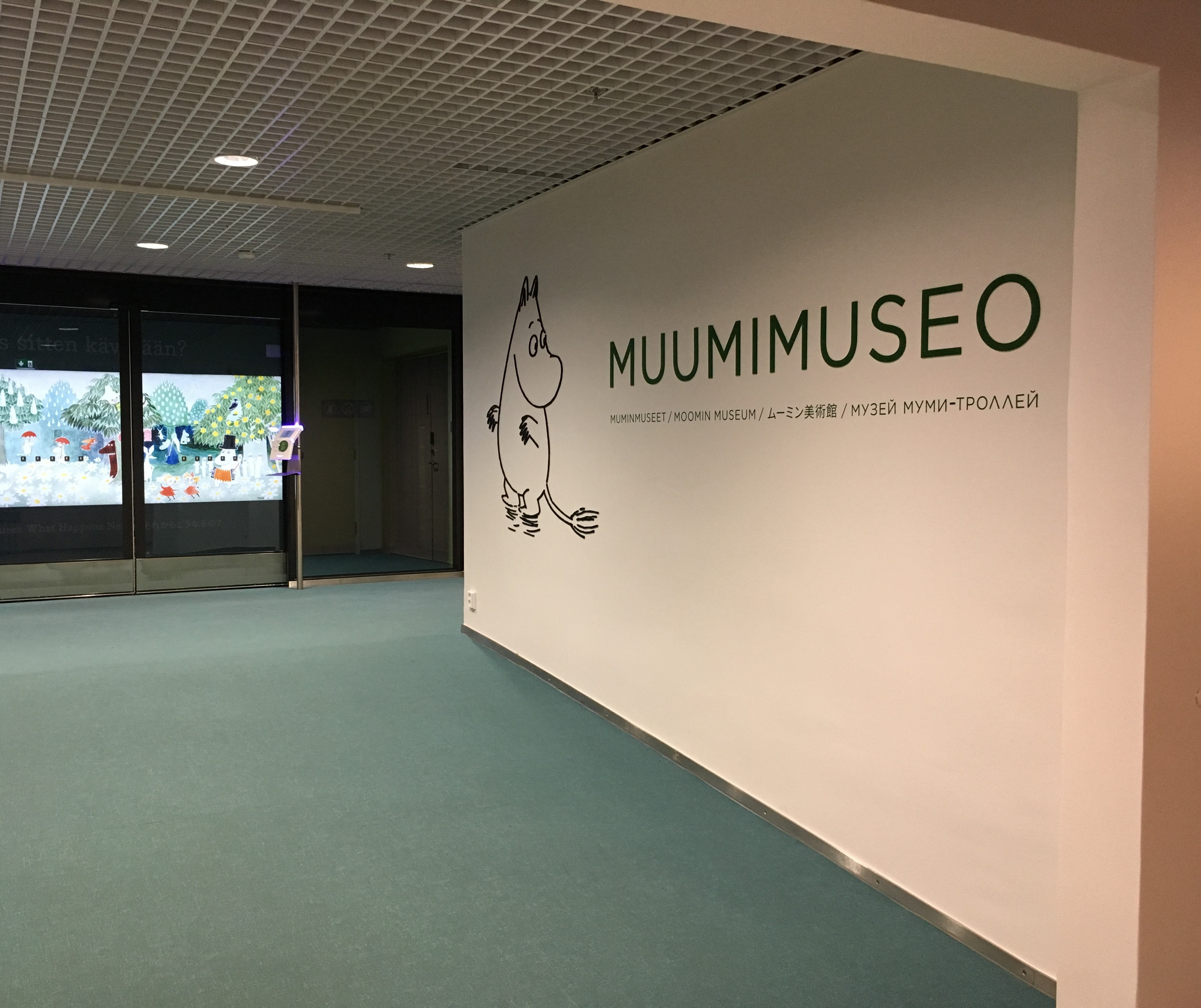
- Front entrance
- Former name: Moominvalley
- Established: 1987
- Location: Tampere Hall, Yliopistonkatu 55; FI-33100 Tampere, Finland
- Coordinates: 61°29′53″N 23°45′02″E
- Type: Children's museum, cartooning museum
- Website: muumimuseo.fi

Moomin Museum (Swedish: Muminmuseet, Finnish: Muumimuseo, formerly called Moominvalley) is situated in the city of Tampere, Finland. Shown at the Moomin Museum are illustrations by Tove Jansson (the creator of Moomins), 40 miniatures, tableaux about Moomin events and a large model (2.5 metres high) Moomin House. There are about 2,000 exhibits on display. Also shown is the original Moominvalley multimedia. The Moomin Shop sells gift items and the Moomin Library offers Moomin books in many languages.

== History ==
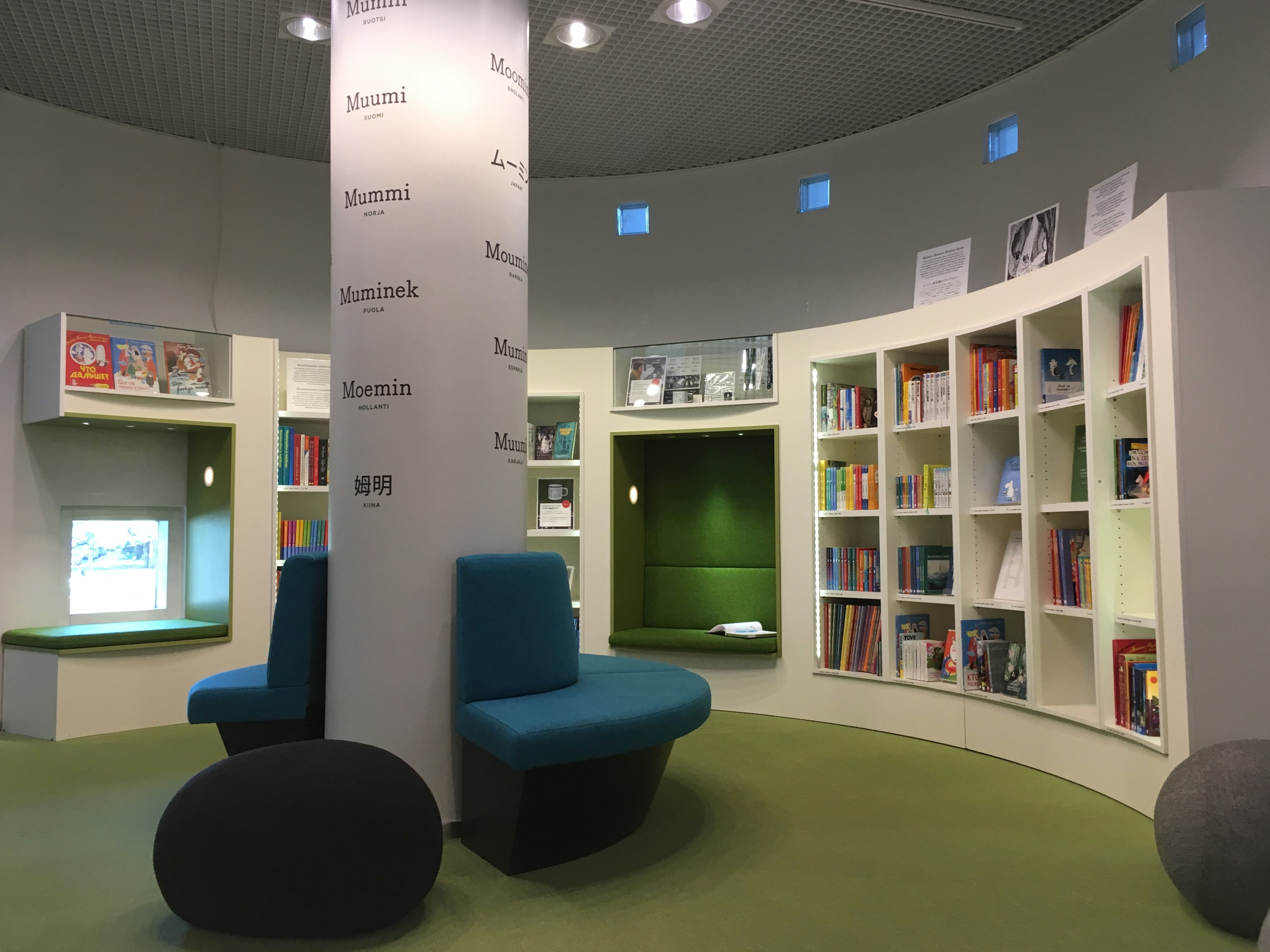
Museum interior

The blue five-story miniature Moominhouse was built by Tuulikki Pietilä, Pentti Eistola and the creator of the Moomins, Tove Jansson, in the late 1970s. The original idea was to make it round, as Jansson always depicted it in her illustrations for the Moomin stories, but since it was to be displayed in a corner at the Bratislava biennale of illustrations in 1979, they decided to make it square instead. No blueprints were made, the house was built freely, floor by floor. It does not follow any particular architectural style but is influenced by many different styles. The ground floor was sketched by Tuulikki Pietilä's brother, architect Reima Pietilä. Originally, a world tour was planned for the house after the 1979 biennale, but eventually it went on tour only in the Nordic countries in 1980-83. Then it was taken to Jansson's studio as it needed some repairs after the tour. It was displayed again at the Art Museum of Tampere in 1986 before gaining its permanent location at the new Moomin Museum, where it has been on display since 1987. Photos of the Moomin House serve as illustrations in An Unwanted Guest, the last of Jansson's four picture books about Moominvalley.

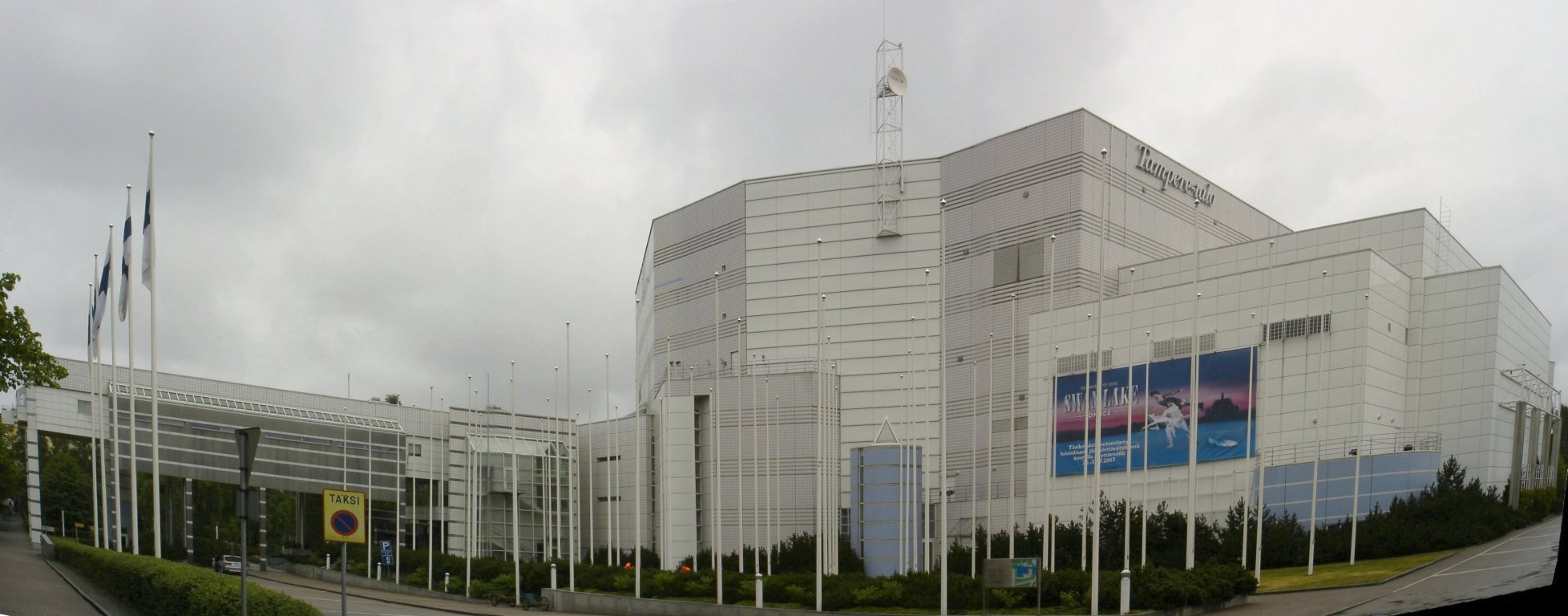
Current location at Tampere Hall

Until the end of 2012, the Moomin Museum was in the basement of the Metso building of the city library. In December 2012, the museum moved into the Tampere Art Museum basement. During the move, a small collection of Tove Jansson's Moomin illustrations were on display in the Vapriikki Museum Centre. The fully renovated Moomin Valley opened on January 2, 2013. The Moomin statue outside the Metso building remained in place. In 2016, the museum moved into Tampere Hall and was renamed the Moomin Museum. The Moomin statue was also moved to its new place. The museum opened in June 2017. At the time of its opening, it was the first of its kind in the world.

== See also ==
- Moomin World – a theme park on the island of Kailo in Southwest Finland
- Moominvalley Park - a theme park in Hannō, Saitama Prefecture, Japan
