= Åke Runnquist =

Swedish publisher and critic

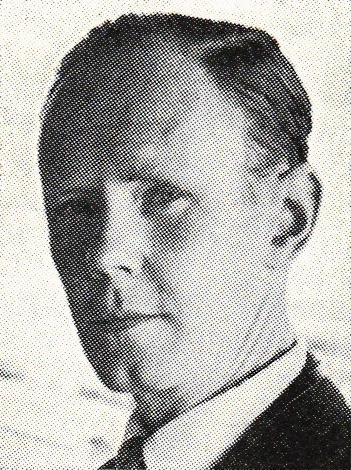
- Born: 23 May 1919; Stockholm, Sweden
- Died: 23 April 1991 (aged 71); Stockholm, Sweden
- Education: Stockholm University
- Occupations: Publisher, literary critic

Åke Runnquist (1919–1991) was a Swedish publisher and literary critic. He was director of the Swedish publishing house Bonniers, where he published many anthologies and literary manuals.

== Biography ==
Åke Runnquist was born on 23 May 1919 in Stockholm. He gained his bachelor's degree at Stockholm University in 1945, and from 1944 was employed by the Bonniers publishing house. He was deputy editor of its literary magazine from 1945 to 1948 and then its editor until 1961. In 1960 he became director of Bonniers.

Runnquist published a large number of anthologies and literary manuals. One of his great interests was crime fiction, and he was one of the founders of the Swedish Crime Fiction Academy in 1971. Tuulikki Pietilä and others have suggested that Runnquist was the author behind the pseudonym Bo Balderson, responsible for many political crime novels between 1968 and 1990. He was Tove Jansson's publisher for many years, exchanging many letters with her; the collaboration began when he invited her to illustrate a translation of Lewis Carroll's The Hunting of the Snark in 1959, and was strengthened by the project to illustrate Alice's Adventures in Wonderland in 1966.

Runnquist was the son of the lawyer Sven Runnquist and Maggie, née Ancker. From 1946, he was married to Ingrid Hökerberg. He died on 23 April 1991 in Stockholm. He is buried in Bromma cemetery.

== Works ==
=== Books ===
- All världens limerickar: en antologi, under pseud. Rune Åquist with Ture Seck (Bromma: Limerickförlaget, 1945)
- Arbetarskildrare: från Hedenvind till Fridell (Stockholm: Albert Bonniers Förlag, 1952)
- Att samla litterära tidskrifter: 1920–1951 (Stockholm: Sällskapet Bokvännerna, 1952)
- Diktaren i dikten: en lyrisk litteraturhistoria, ed. (Stockholm: Sällskapet Bokvännerna, 1954)
- Hästar i dikt och verklighet: en antologi, ed. (Stockholm: Bonniers, 1955)
- En silverantologi: Ur Bonniers litterära magasin under 25 år, ed. with Georg Svensson (Stockholm: Bonniers, 1956)
- Den lätta lyriken: en antologi, ed., illustrated by Signe Lund (Stockholm: Bonniers, 1957)
- Svensk mordbok: den svenska detektivromanens historia 1900–1950, with Jörgen Elgström (Stockholm: Sällskapet Bokvännerna, 1957)
- I pegasens kölvatten: studier i bokvärlden (Stockholm: egenutg., 1958)
- Poeten Nils Ferlin (Stockholm: Bonniers, 1958)
- Moderna svenska författare: en samlad översikt över svensk litteratur under tre årtionden (Stockholm: Forum, 1959)
- Mord i biblioteket: detektivromanens märkvärdiga historia, with Jörgen Elgström and Tage la Cour (Stockholm: Bonniers, 1961)
- Moderna utländska författare (Stockholm: Forum, 1962)
- Nils Ferlin: en bildbiografi (Stockholm: Bonniers, 1962)
- Litterära tidskrifter 1920–1960 (Stockholm: Bonniers, 1964)
- 101 moderna utländska författare (Stockholm: Forum, 1965)
- Moderna nordiska författare: en översikt över nordisk litteratur under fyra årtionden: Danmark, Färöarna, Finland, Island, Norge (Stockholm: Forum, 1966)
- Boksverige: författare, förlag, bokhandel, bibliotek, with Bengt Holmström (Stockholm: Aldus/Bonniers, 1971)
- Mord på Östermalm: tre fall från bokhyllan (Stockholm: Billbergs bokhandel, 1977)
- Den omättlige bokläsaren (Stockholm: Trevi, 1992, med ett förord av Sven Delblanc)

=== Translations ===
- J.M. Barrie, Peter Pan, illustrated by Ingrid Rosell (Stockholm: Bonniers, 1951)
- Jules Verne, Tsarens kurir (Michael Strogoff) (Stockholm: Bonniers, 1954)
- C. Northcote Parkinson, Parkinsons lag och andra studier i administrationens konst (Parkinson's law and other studies in administration) (Stockholm: Bonniers, 1958)
- Lewis Carroll, Snarkjakten (The Hunting of the Snark), with Lars Forssell, illustrated by Tove Jansson (Stockholm: Bonniers, 1959)
- Stephen Potter, Livsmannaskap: en oumbärlig handledning i konsten att flyta ovanpå (Some notes on lifemanship) (Stockholm: Bonniers, 1959)
- Lewis Carroll, Alice i Underlandet (Alice's Adventures in Wonderland), illustrated by Tove Jansson (Stockholm: Bonniers, 1966)
