= Atelier Fauni =

Finnish company

- Company type: Private
- Industry: Arts and crafts, toy manufacturing
- Founded: 1952
- Founder: Helena Kuuskoski; Martti Kuuskoski
- Defunct: 1971
- Headquarters: Naantali, Finland
- Products: Handcrafted toys, trolls, Moomin figures

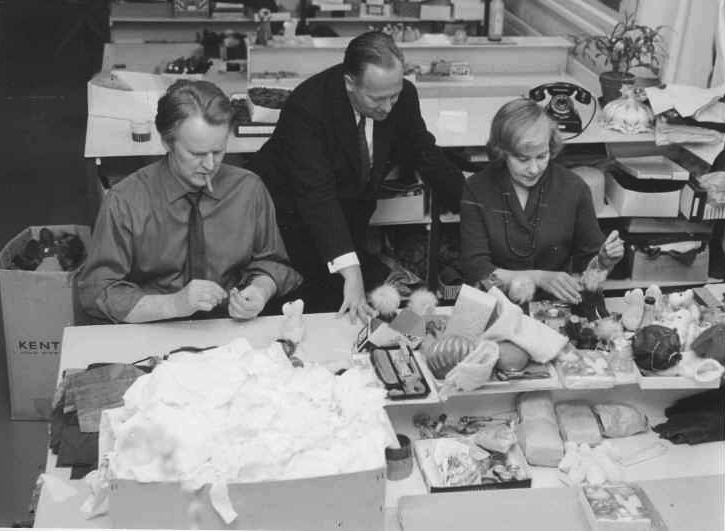
Martti and Helena Kuuskoski (sitting) demonstrate the making of trolls to a visitor around 1965.

Atelier Fauni was a Finnish arts and crafts studio that operated from 1952 to 1971.

It was founded in 1952 in Naantali by Helena Kuuskoski and her husband, the actor Martti Kuuskoski (1917–2011). From Naantali, and later in Tusby and Träskända, the company made soft toys, mainly in the form of handmade trolls made from leather, fabric and skin.

The studio was best known for their Moomin figurines, which were produced from 1955 and are now collector's items. The studio initially did not have a license to produce Moomin merchandise, but Tove Jansson liked the dolls, and between 1955 and 1971 they had Jansson's permission to create the Moomin figurines. The most successful figure, however, was the sumppi troll, which inspired the name of a band. Their creations also inspired a theme park, Peikkometsä, in Järvenpää.

The atelier name comes from the Roman forest god, Faunus.

Atelier Fauni was re-established in the U.S. in the 1970s by Kuuskoski and her children under the name Troll Store. Helena Kuuskoski died in Wilmington, North Carolina on September 1, 2013.
