= Kerberos (magazine) =

Swedish language satirical magazine published in Finland (1917–1921)

- Categories: Satirical magazine
- Founded: 1917
- Final issue: 1921
- Country: Finland
- Based in: Helsinki
- Language: Swedish; Finnish

Kerberos was a Swedish language satirical magazine published in Helsinki, Finland, in the period 1917–1921. Its subtitle was Tidskrift för satir och humor (Swedish: Satirical and humor magazine).

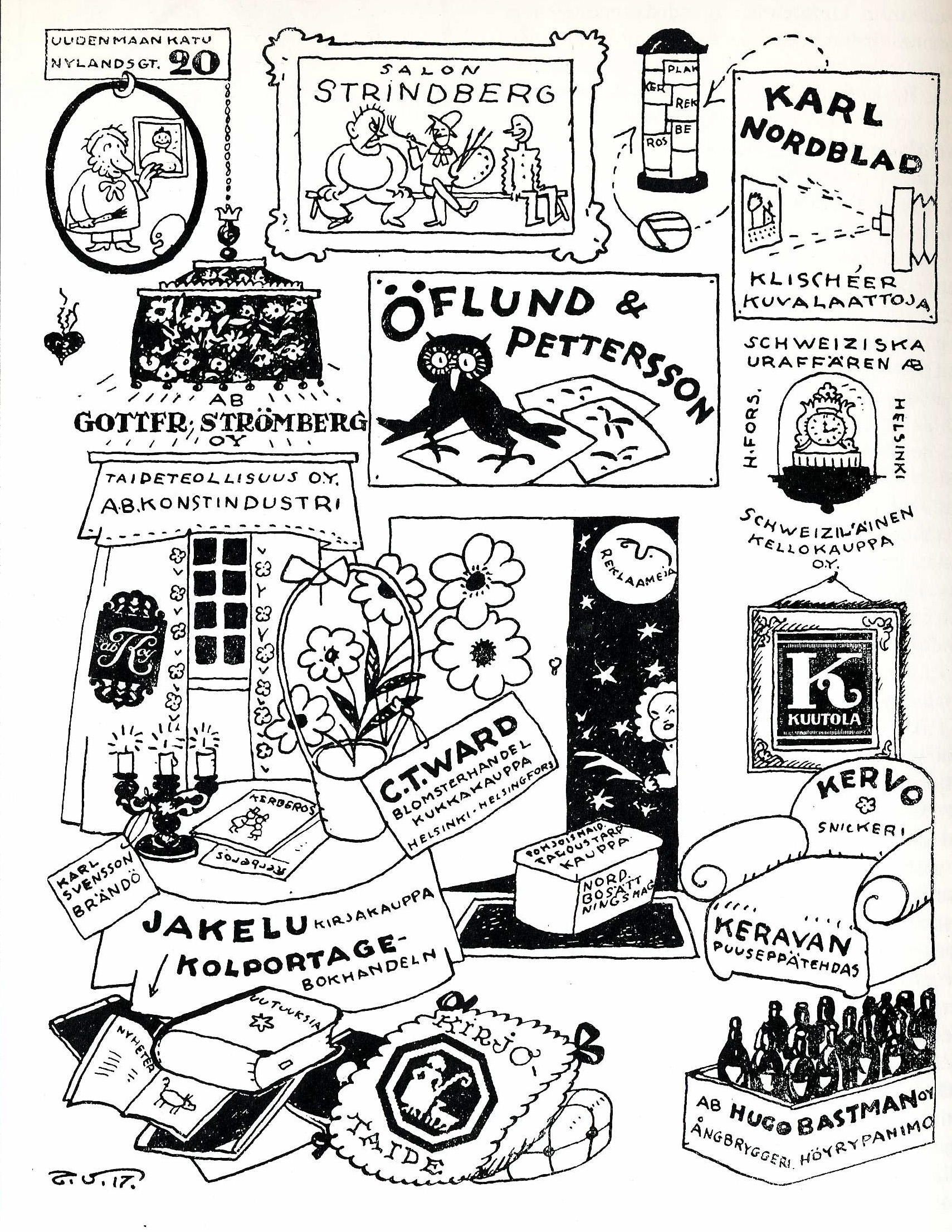
Cartoons used in Kerberos

== History and profile ==
Kerberos was launched in 1917. The magazine had a liberal political stance, although politics was not its sole focus. It also featured artistic writings. From 1917 to 1918, it also produced a Finnish language edition, which improved the popularity of the magazine. The audience of the magazine was cultural elites.

Kerberos supported anti-communist and anti-bolshevik views when dealing with the newly founded communist regime in Russia. The magazine authors argued that monarchy would be better option for the country and also, for the interests of Finland. The magazine folded in 1921 and was succeeded by another Swedish language satirical magazine, Garm.
