= Villain in the Moominhouse =

1980 children's book by Tove Jansson

- First edition. The cover illustration is a photograph of the model Moominhouse.
- Author: Tove Jansson
- Original title: Skurken i Muminhuset
- Language: Swedish
- Publisher: Bonniers
- Publication date: 1980
- Publication place: Finland
- Media type: Hardcover
- Preceded by: The Dangerous Journey

Skurken i Muminhuset, or Villain in the Moominhouse, is a 1980 picture book by the Finland Swedish author Tove Jansson. The work is Jansson's final Moomin book. Unlike her earlier picture books, it is illustrated not with her paintings but with photographs of Moomin figures and the large model of the Moominhouse made by Jansson and her friends, taken by her brother, Per Olov Jansson.

== Plot ==
One night, the full moon casts a strange light on Moominvalley. The Moomins are awoken by an uninvited guest, Stinky. He is not just a small bad-smelling character, but turns out to be an evil villain.

== Analysis ==
Unusually, the book used photographs in lieu of illustrations. These were taken by Tove Jansson's brother, Per Olov Jansson, and were set in and around the large model of the Moominhouse built by Tove Jansson and her partner Tuulikki Pietilä. The model led both to the picture book and to a short story, The Doll's House. The house and the models of the Moomins and their friends used in the books are now on display at the Moomin Museum in Tampere.

== English translation ==
The book was published in Swedish and Finnish.

The first official English translation of Villain in the Moominhouse by the Tove Jansson historian Ant O'Neill was premiered in a reading at the ArchWay With Words literary festival on 25 September 2017.

== Sources ==
- Karjalainen, Tuula (2016) [2013]. Tove Jansson: Work and Love. Penguin Books. ISBN 978-0-141-97882-6.
- Westin, Boel (2014) [2007]. Tove Jansson Life, Art, Words: The Authorised Biography. Translated by Mazzarella, Silvester. Sort of Books. ISBN 978-1-908745-45-3.
