= Suomen kansallisbiografia =

Finnish collection of biographies

Suomen kansallisbiografia 1–10
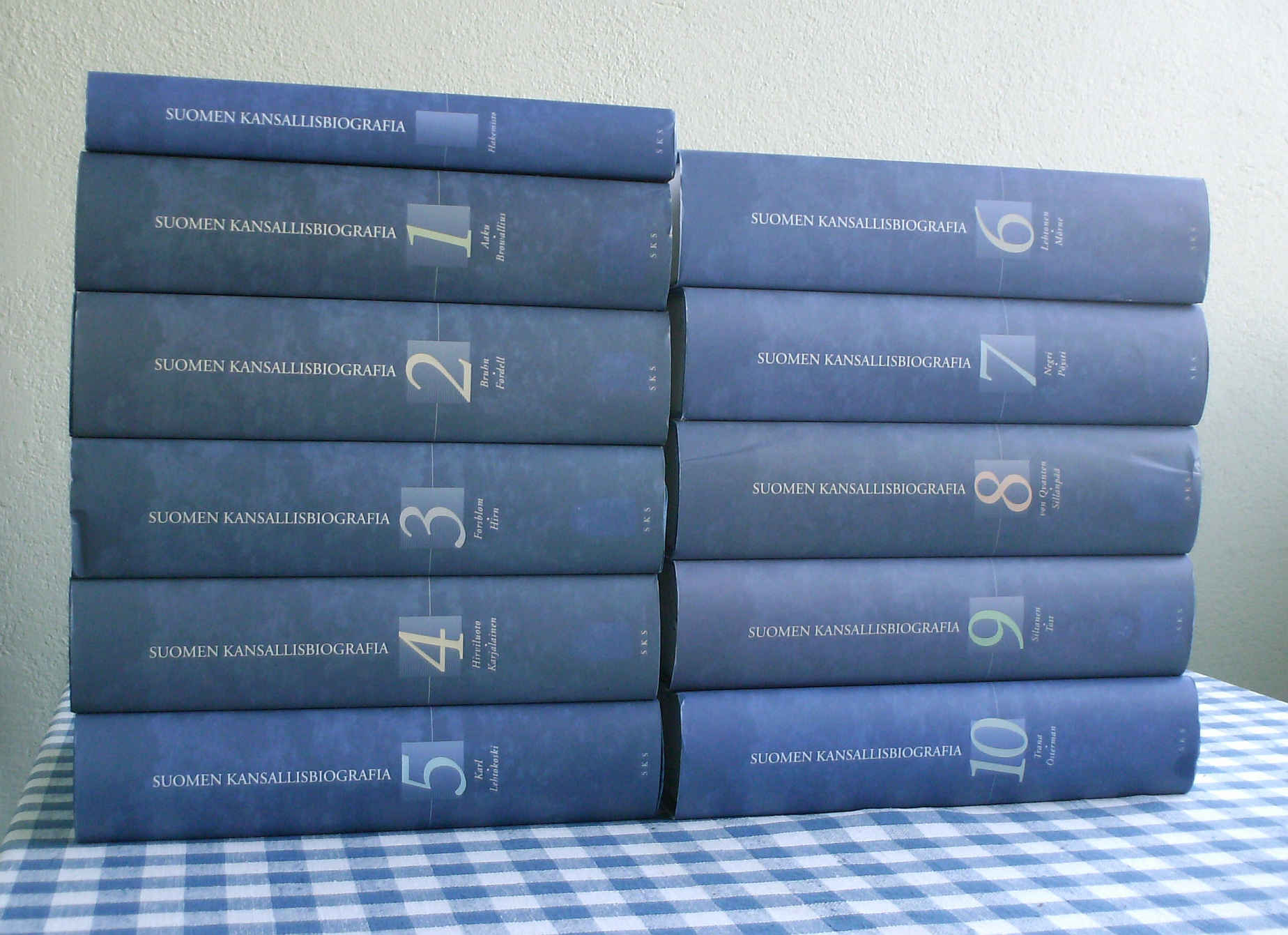
- A complete set
- Author: Matti Klinge (ed.)
- Cover artist: Heikki Kalliomaa
- Language: Finnish
- Series: Studia Biographica (ISSN 1456-2138)
- Subject: biography
- Publisher: Suomalaisen Kirjallisuuden Seura
- Publication date: 2003–2008
- Publication place: Finland
- Pages: 9519
- ISBN: 978-951-746-441-3
- Website: http://www.kansallisbiografia.fi/

Suomen kansallisbiografia (English: National Biography of Finland) is a collection of more than 6,000 biographies of individuals and families who have made important contributions to the development of Finnish society.
