= Metsä (theme park) =

Moomin theme park in Hannō, Japan

Coordinates: 35°52′21″N 139°19′45.6″E

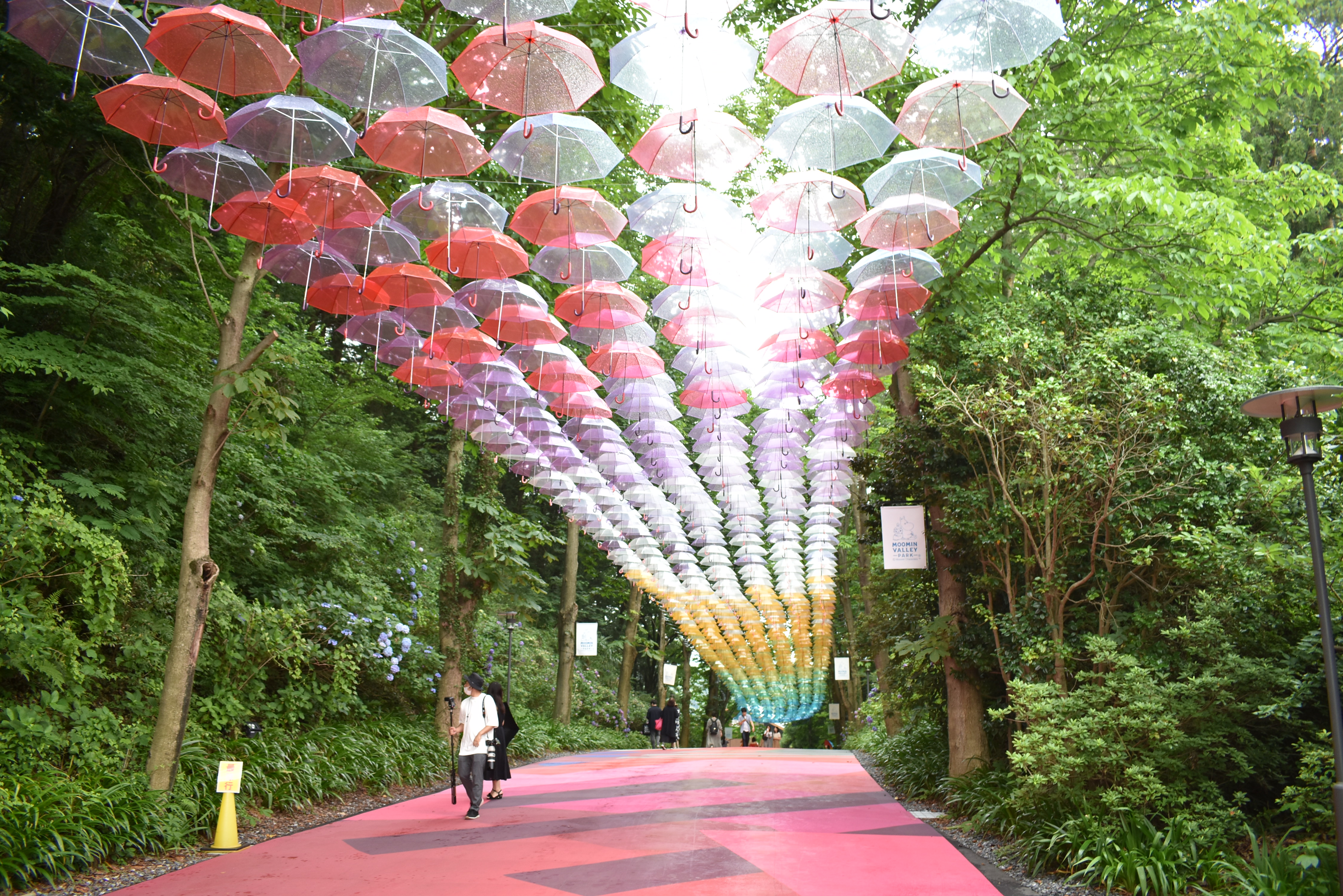
The park in 2019

Metsä (Finnish: [ˈmetsæ]; lit. 'forest') is a Moomin theme park in Hannō, Saitama Prefecture, Japan.

Situated in Hannō, a city northwest of Tokyo, the site includes a Moomin zone for attractions and a free public zone or park area. Entrance to Metsä Village is free, but Moominvalley Park has an admission fee for the park and some of the attractions.

The park was closed temporarily in April 2020 due to the COVID-19 pandemic.

== History ==
On June 30, 2015, FinTech Global Incorporated announced that it would build Moomin based theme park Metsä (meaning "forest" in Finnish) in Hannō City, Saitama Prefecture. The park will be developed on approximately 187,000 square meters of land around Lake Miyazawa and will feature a paid Moomin zone and a free public zone.

FinTech Global bought land from Seibu Railway, which had been operating leisure facilities in the area, for the price of 600 million yen. Initially, they considered establishing a small-scale theme park in urban areas such as Tachikawa. In the end, however, they decided to acquire land around Lake Miyazawa, believing that "the essence of Moomin cannot be captured without forests and lakes."

The opening of the theme park was postponed multiple times. The park was initially planned to start operation in 2015 to mark the 100th birthday of Finnish writer Tove Jansson. On June 30, 2015, it was announced that the opening would be delayed until 2017 at the earliest. On December 6, 2016, the opening date was further delayed to spring 2019.

A groundbreaking ceremony was held on June 30, 2017. After completion on October 3, 2018, the "Metsä Village" in the public zone opened on November 9, 2018, followed by the opening of "Moominvalley Park" on March 16, 2019.

== Metsä Village ==
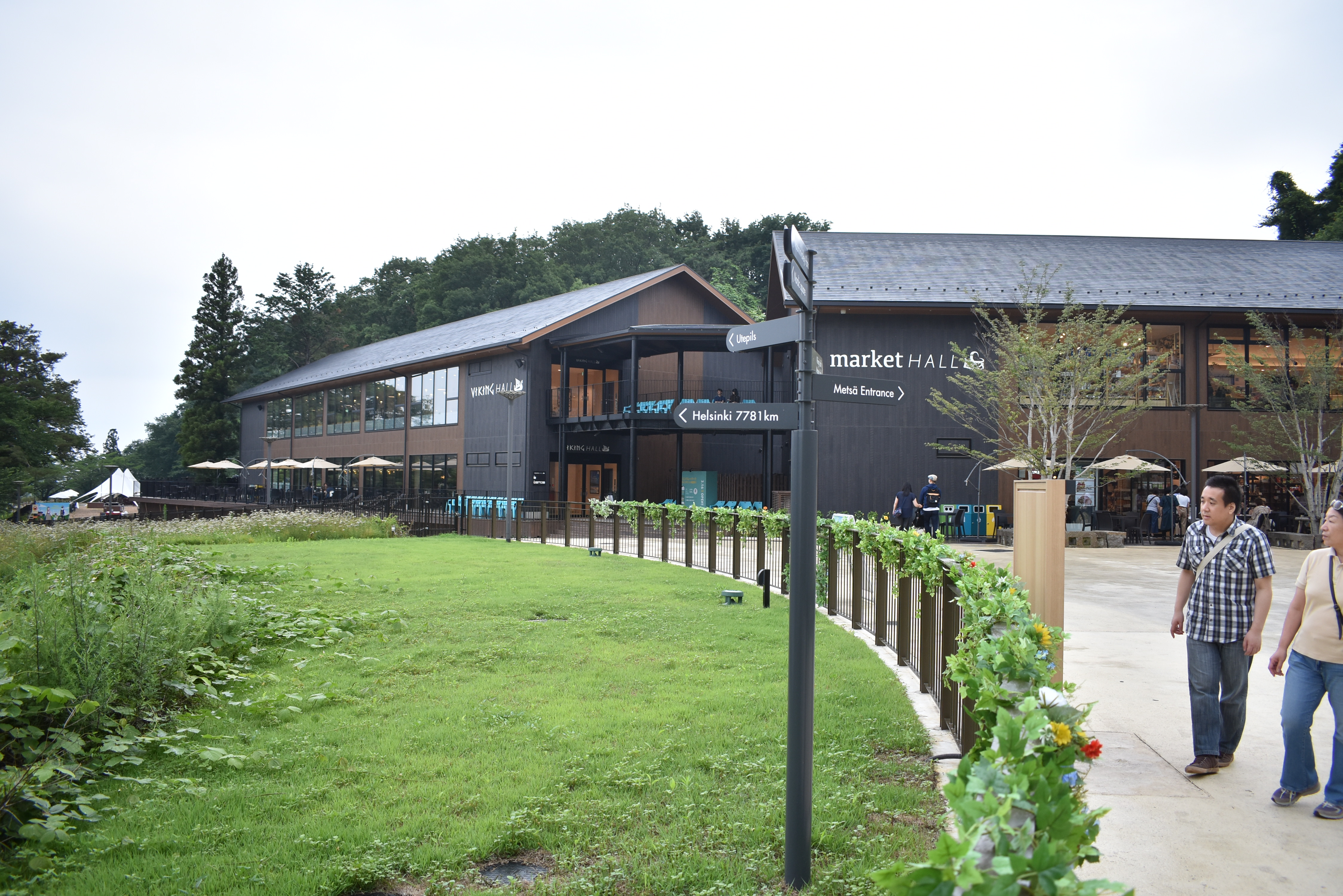
Metsä Village

Metsä Village is a large park and leisure area which is intended to evoke the happiness of the Nordic world through bringing visitors close to nature. The complex encircles Lake Miyazawa and is intended to resemble the Finnish countryside.

Inside is a Nordic Market Hall selling Nordic themed goods, as well as Nordic restaurants. Visitors can also attend wood crafting classes in the craft hall or rent Scandinavian-styled boats to row along the lake.

== Moominvalley Park ==
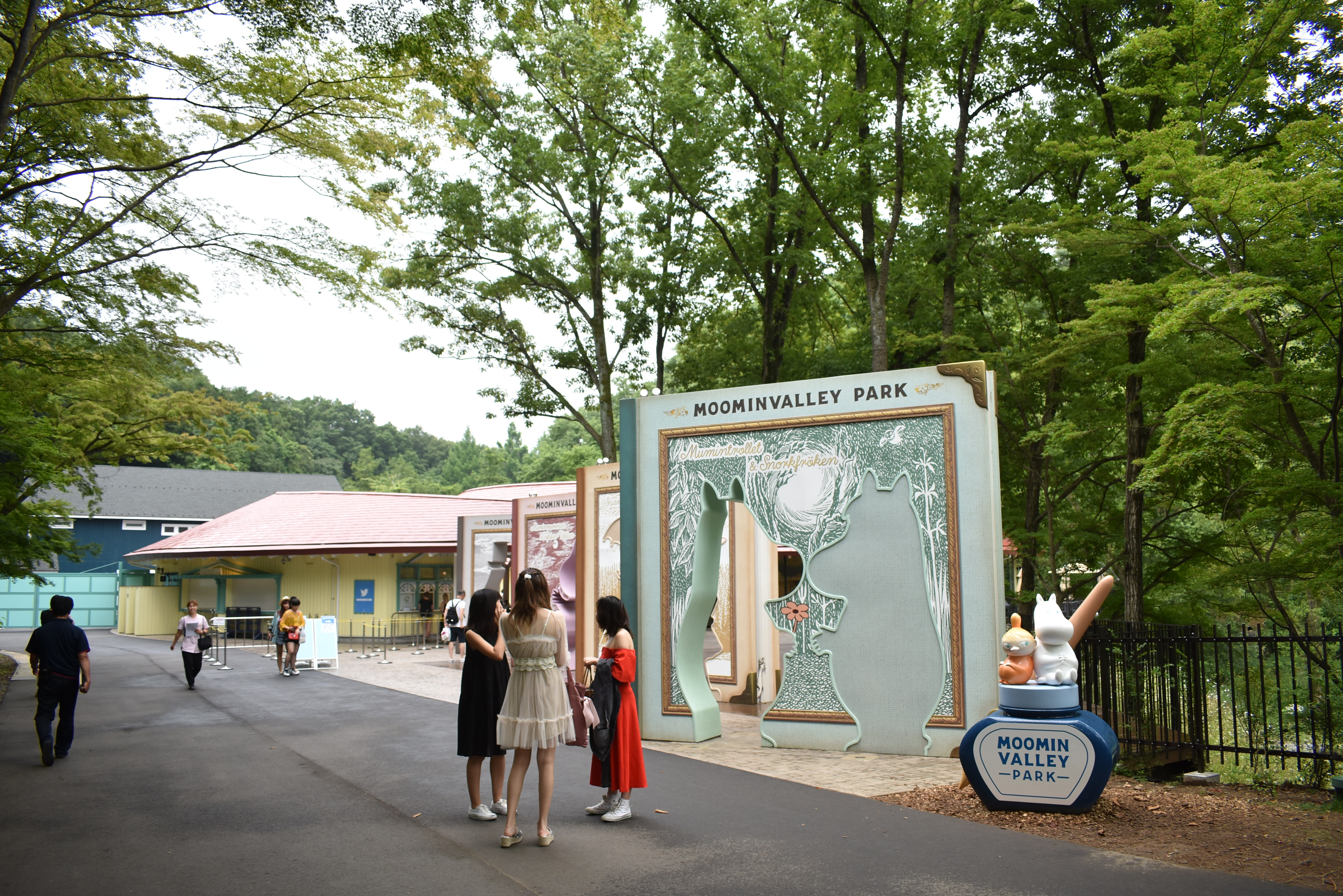
Welcome Gate of Moominvalley Park

Moominvalley Park is the second Moomin theme park in the world after Moomin World and the first one outside of Finland. Modeled after the universe of the Moomins, the park brings to life the valley where the characters live and play and thus has few traditional attractions and is aimed more at recreating the look and feel of the fictional Moominvalley. In keeping with the Finnish origins of the source material, many park attractions and signs are in Finnish. The park is roughly divided into four areas: Hajimari no Irie, Moominvalley, Kokemus, and Osabishiyama.

Park attractions include:

- Welcome Gate: The entrance to the park, which includes photo cutouts for guests to pose with. Intended to invoke the visitors entering a story book.
- Little My's Play Spots (Pikku Myyn leikkipaikka): An interactive theater-type attraction for families that performs short programs starring Little My where she invites the audience to partake in her mischief. There is also a Little My themed gift shop (Pikkku Myy Kauppa).
- Moominhouse (Muumitalo): A recreation of the iconic Moominhouse where Moomintroll and his family live. Tours are available at an additional charge. The interior of the house includes several scenes that are references to events in the stories.
- Lighthouse (Majakka): A recreation of the lighthouse from Moominpappa at Sea.
- Bathing Hut (Uimahuone): A recreation of the bathing house from the books.
- Emma's Theater (Emma Teatteri): An outdoor theater performing short shows featuring the main characters from the books. Performances are in Japanese.
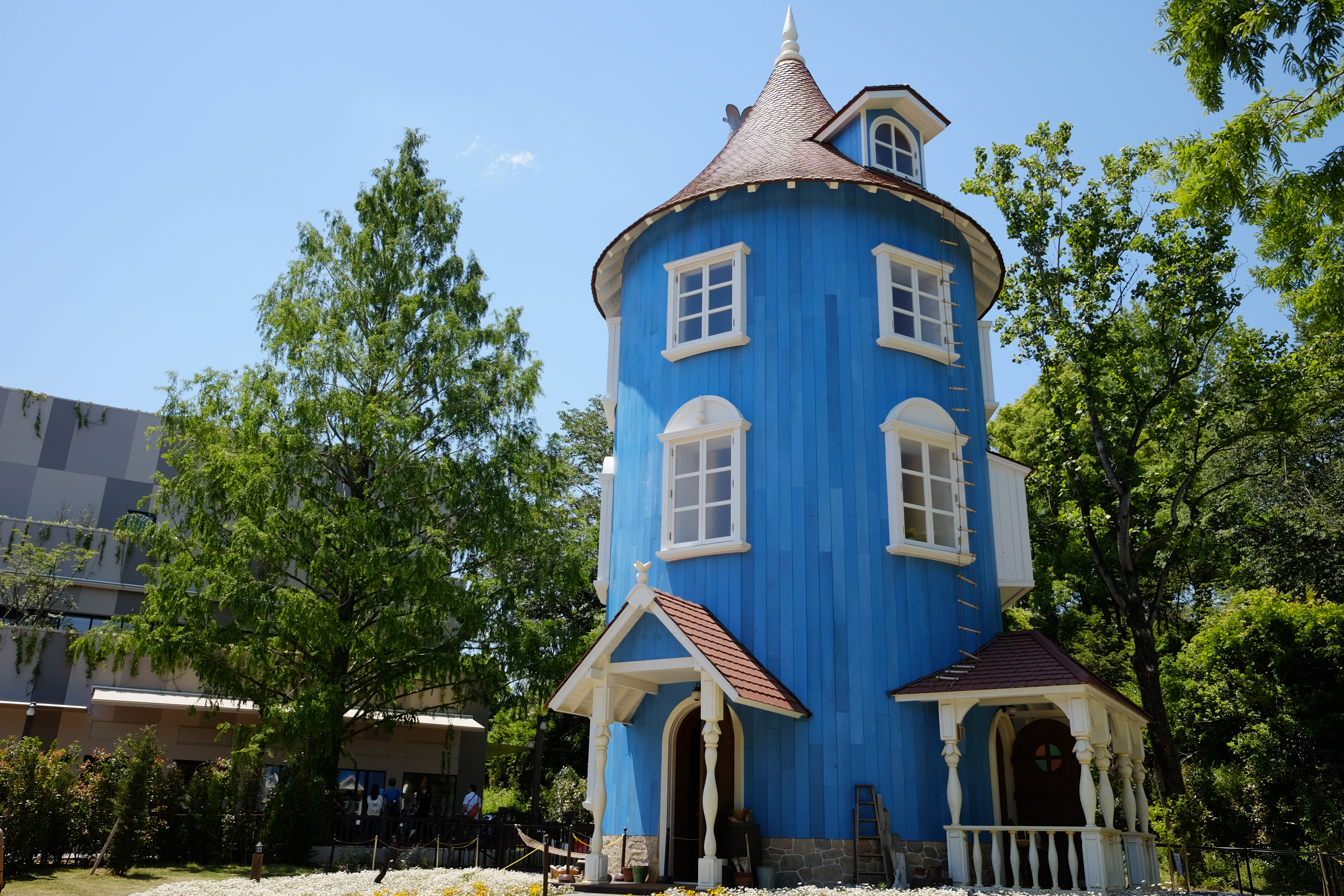
- Exterior of Moominhouse (Muumitalo)
  Oshun Oxtra (Merenhuiske): An indoor morphing theater that depicts the adventures of Moominpappa in his youth along with Snufkin's dad the Joxter, and Sniff's dad the Muddler on the "Oshun Oxtra".
- Kokemus: The exhibition hall intended to highlight the life of creator Tove Jansson and the creation of the books.

There is also a pancake restaurant, Lettula, in the Welcome Gate. The gift shop, Alku Kauppa, sells Moomin merchandise and includes collectible Moomin items only sold in Japan.
