= Blommer =

Blommer, or Blommér, may refer to:

- Blommer Chocolate Company in Chicago, Illinois, U.S.
- Blommer Science Library at Georgetown University Library in Washington, D.C., U.S.

== People ==
=== People with the surname Blommer ===
- Edla Blommér (1817–1908) born as Edla Gustafva Jansson, Finnish painter
- Nils Blommér (1816–1853) born as Nils Johan Olsson, Swedish painter

=== People with the surname Blommers ===
- Bernard Blommers (1845–1914) Dutch painter, etcher
- Cor Blommers (1901–1983) Dutch boxer
