= Nordstrom Building =

Nordstrom Building may refer to:

- Nordstrom Downtown Portland
- Nordstrom Downtown Seattle
- Central Park Tower (a.k.a. the Nordstrom Tower) in New York City

== See also ==
- Nordstrom
