= Gertrude Jones Hawk =

American candy maker and entrepreneur

- Born: 1903; Dunmore, Pennsylvania, U.S.
- Died: May 31, 1987; Scranton, Pennsylvania, U.S.
- Occupations: Chocolate maker, entrepreneur
- Website: www.gertrudehawkchocolates.com

Gertrude Jones Hawk (1903–1987) was an American candy maker and entrepreneur who created the Gertrude Hawk Chocolates company based upon her experience making chocolate from her home in Scranton, Pennsylvania. Gertrude Hawk was central to the company's financial success due to her development of fundraising networks in which local civic institutions could resell chocolates to support their own programs.

Her multi-million dollar chocolate company operates over 60 Gertrude Hawk Chocolates Chocolate Shops throughout the states of Pennsylvania, New Jersey and New York. The company produces their own brand of chocolates along with other company's brands, including Frango's, a mint truffle popularized by the department store Marshall Field's. It also supplies chocolate and confections to other food manufacturers such as Ben and Jerry’s, Turkey Hill Dairy, The Hershey Company, Nestle and Fanny May.

== Early life ==
Gertrude Jones was born in 1903 in Dunmore, Pennsylvania, to Gomer and Ellen Jones. Her father died when Gertrude was 12 years old and her mother suffered from a severe heart condition. In order to help support her family, she took a job in a candy shop, where she learned how to make chocolate. According to her grandson David Hawk, "My grandmother [Gertrude] was only able to complete the eighth grade ... and there was no thought of going on to college. The best thing she could do was to learn a trade. So she worked at several of Scranton's small candy stores and learned the craft of chocolate-dipping."

Gertrude married Elmer Hawk in 1922, and they later had two sons, Elmer R. and Richard.

== Career ==
In 1936, during the Great Depression, Gertrude began making chocolates from the kitchen of their home in the Bunker Hill section of Scranton in order to supplement the family's income. After returning from service in World War II, her son Elmer R. Hawk joined the family business and invested in the purchase of mechanical chocolate-making equipment.

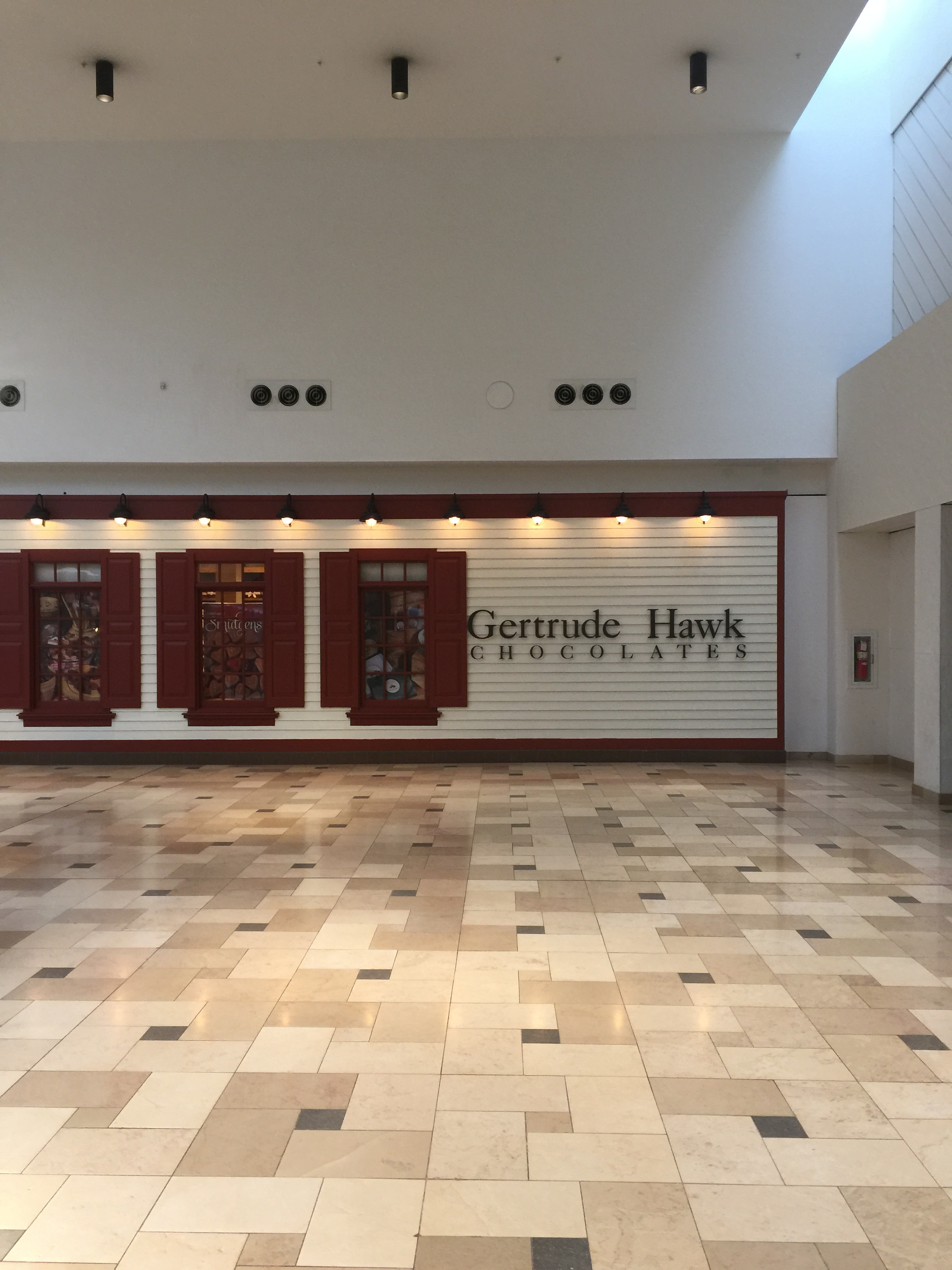
Gertrude Hawk Chocolates store in the Exton Square Mall

In the 1940s Gertrude greatly expanded their home chocolate production by creating and promoting fundraising sales among local area schools, civic associations and churches. Her visionary fundraising alliances allowed the company to go beyond direct sales and advertise among a broad section of the local community, thus increasing profits considerably, to over $125,000 per year by 1959.

In 1959, the Pennsylvania Department of Transportation took over Gertrude's home for the construction of a bridge over Interstate 81. As a result, the family purchased land in Dunmore, Pennsylvania, and built a chocolate factory, full-service restaurant and retail store that opened in 1962. Over the next 25 years, the company's business expanded and required multiple additions to the original factory building. The restaurant was converted into a candy shop in 1973. Gertrude and her husband Elmer continued to live in an apartment above the chocolate factory until their deaths.

Gertrude officially retired from the company in 1962, but continued to visit the factory floor and help pack chocolates for a few years. In 1979, Elmer bought out his parents' share in the company and served as president and CEO Gertrude Hawk Chocolates from 1979 until 1992, when the position was taken over by his son, Gertrude's grandson, David Hawk.

Elmer Hawk Sr. died in 1981. Gertrude Hawk died in 1987. According to her obituary, Gertrude was a member of the Myrtle Street United Methodist Church and the Business and Professional Women's Association.

Elmer Hawk Jr. died on October 18, 2013, at 89 years of age.

== Legacy ==
Gertrude Hawk Chocolates has an extensive history of fundraising in the Scranton area supporting organizations such as the Make A Wish Foundation, Red Cross, local Boys and Girls Clubs and the Women's Resource Center, a shelter for women hurt by domestic violence. The Hawk family has provided scholarships at Keystone College, Penn State Scranton, Johnson Technical Institute and the DePaul School. In 2018, the family announced the creation of the Gertrude Hawk Foundation, a multi-million dollar multi-generational charitable foundation that will support education, underprivileged children and the elderly, prison ministry and other causes.

In 2018, Gertrude Hawk was inducted into the Candy Hall of Fame.
