= Downtown Seattle =

Central business district of Seattle, Washington, U.S.

- Central business district
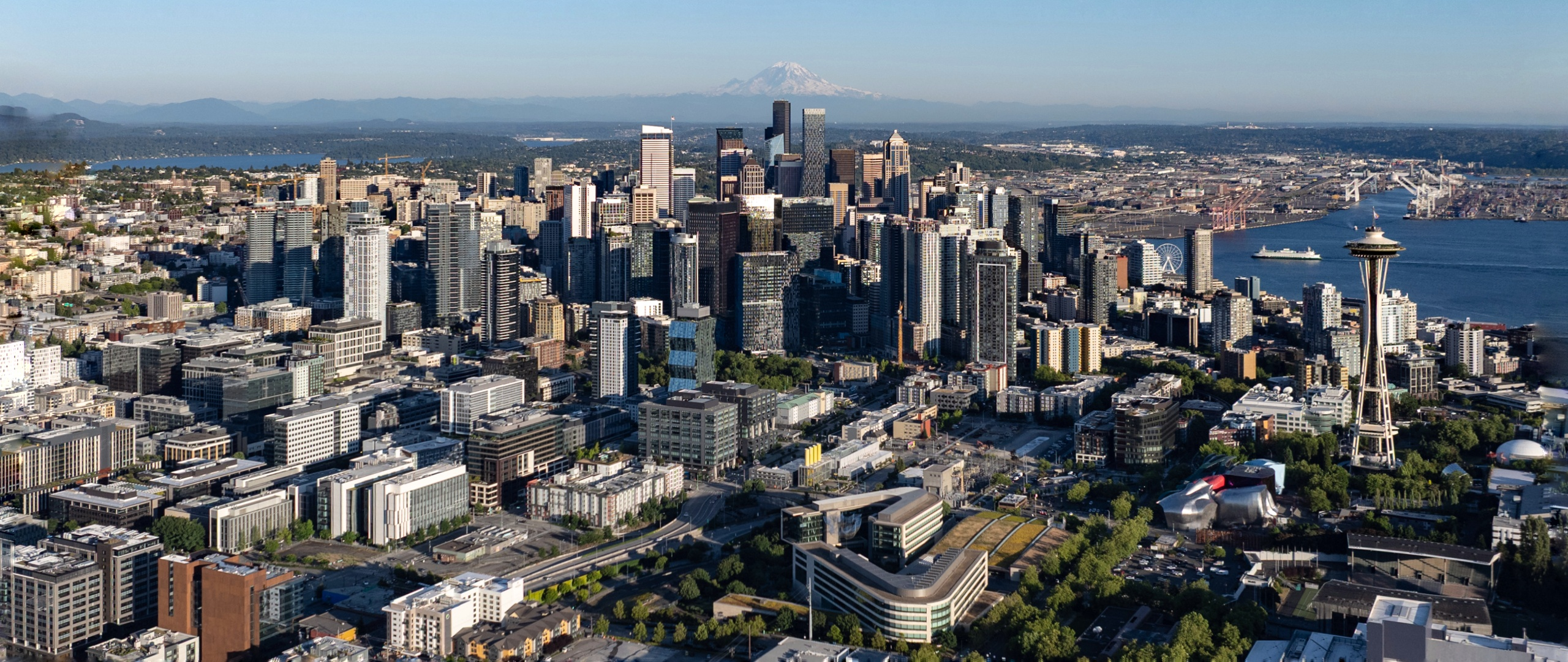
- Aerial view of Downtown Seattle, 2025

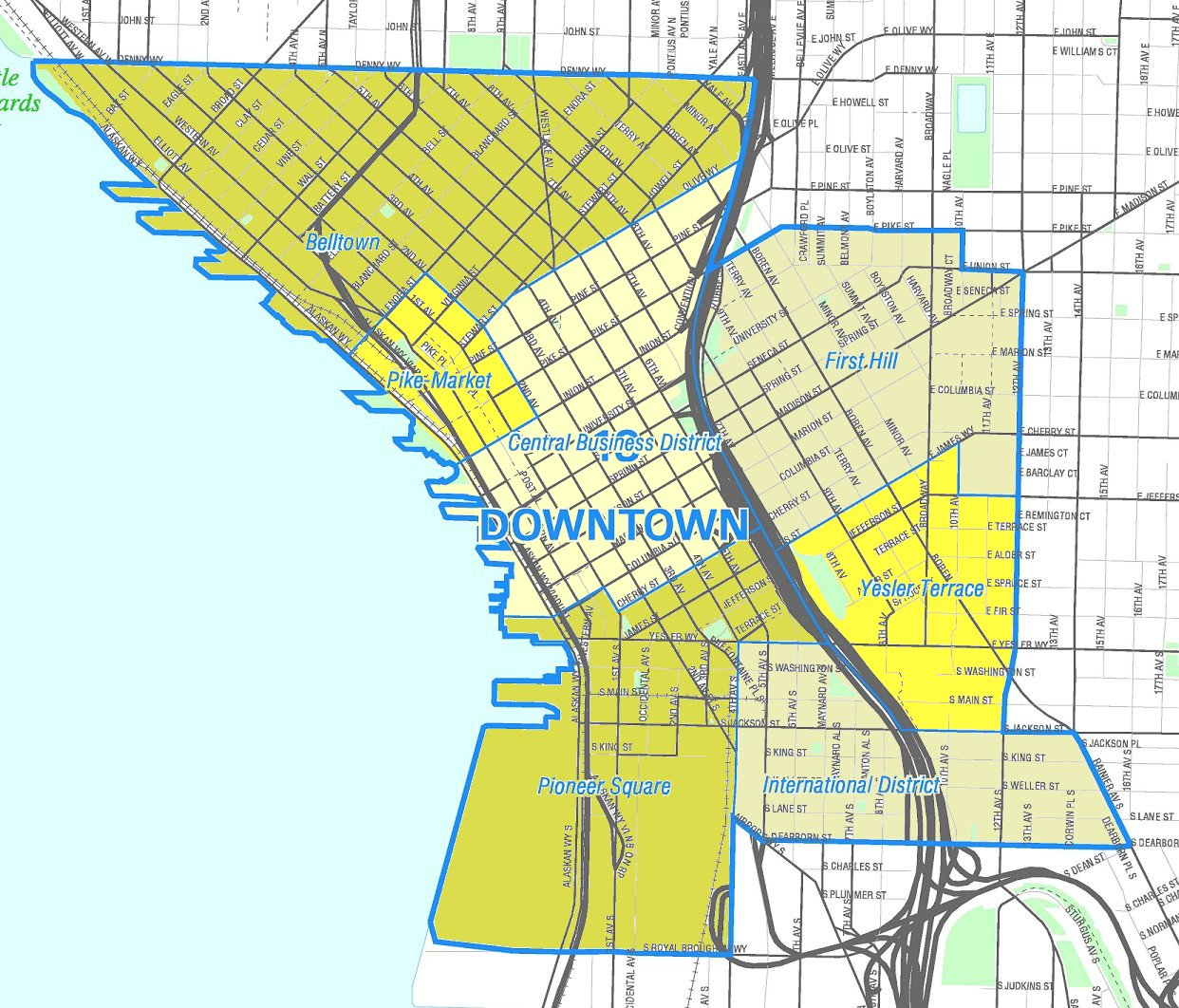
- Downtown Seattle and Downtown Neighborhoods Highlighted in Yellow
- Coordinates: 47°36′29″N 122°20′10″W
- Country: United States
- State: Washington
- County: King
- City: Seattle

Population (2024)
  - Total: 108,488
- Time zone: UTC−8 (PST)
  - Summer (DST): UTC−7 (PDT)
- Zip Code: 98121
- Area Code: 206, 564
- Website: downtownseattle.org

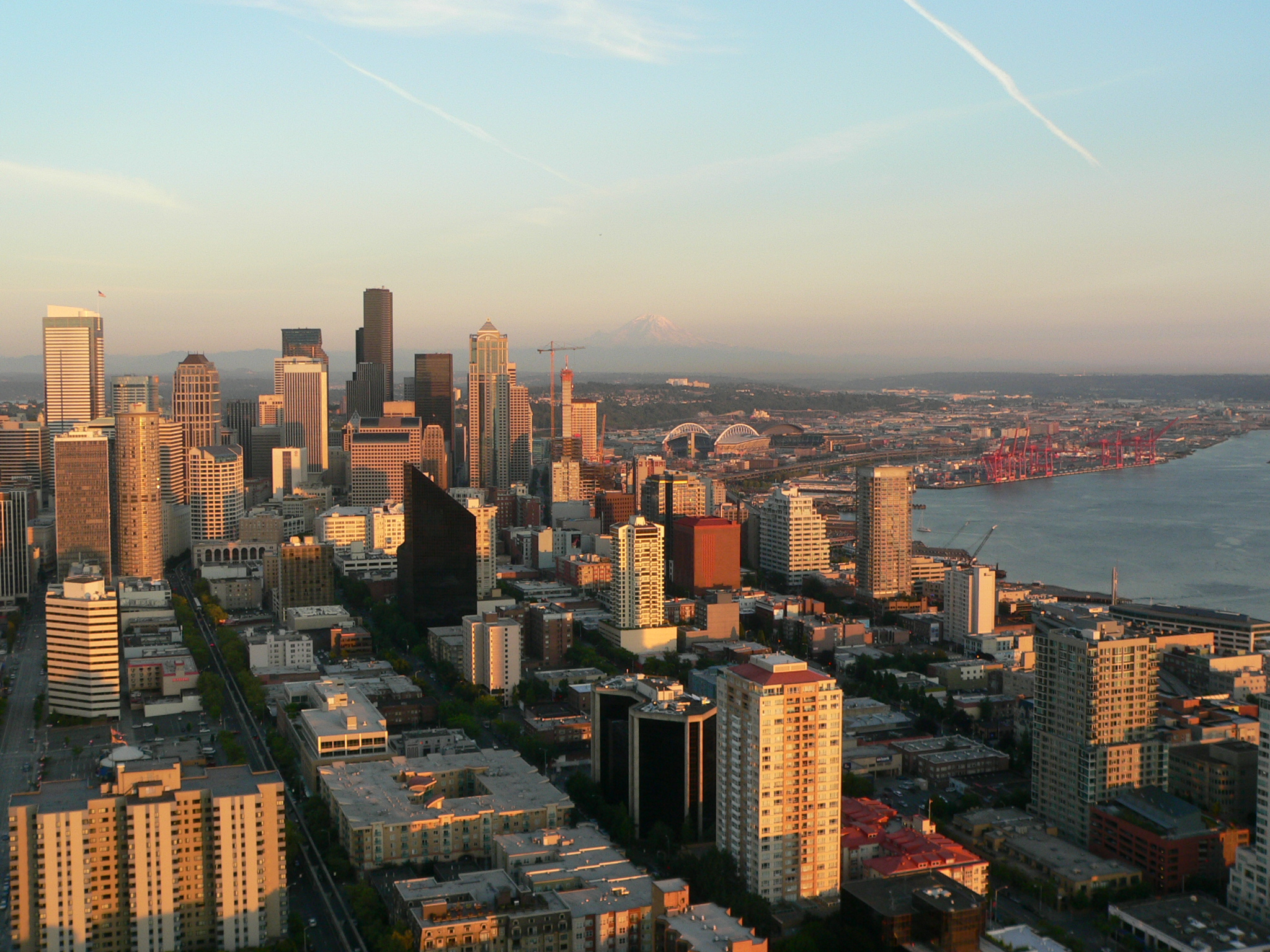
Downtown Seattle viewed from the top of the Space Needle in 2005 (looking south). Beyond downtown lies the Industrial District

Timelapse video of downtown streets from atop a Community Transit double-decker bus

Downtown is the central business district of Seattle, Washington. It is fairly compact compared with other city centers on the U.S. West Coast due to its geographical situation, being hemmed in on the north and east by hills, on the west by Elliott Bay, and on the south by reclaimed land that was once tidal flats. It is bounded on the north by Denny Way, beyond which are Lower Queen Anne (sometimes known as "Uptown"), Seattle Center, and South Lake Union; on the east by Interstate 5, beyond which is Capitol Hill to the northeast and Central District to the east; on the south by S Dearborn Street, beyond which is Sodo; and on the west by Elliott Bay, a part of Puget Sound.

== Neighborhoods ==
Belltown, Denny Triangle, the retail district, the West Edge, the financial district, the government district, Pioneer Square, Chinatown, Japantown, Little Saigon, and the western flank of First Hill west of Broadway make up downtown Seattle's chief neighborhoods. Near the center of downtown is the Metropolitan Tract which is owned by the University of Washington; prior to 1895 it served as the location of the university's campus. Downtown is Seattle's financial and commercial maritime hub as well as its center of nightlife and shopping. The downtown shopping mall Westlake Center is connected to Seattle Center by a monorail.

== Landmarks ==
Downtown Seattle's Columbia Center has 76 floors, a greater number than any other building west of the Mississippi River (although there are taller buildings in Texas and California). Smith Tower, in the Pioneer Square area, once held the title of tallest American building west of the Mississippi. Other notable buildings are the 1201 Third Avenue (formerly the Washington Mutual Tower), Two Union Square, Nordstrom's flagship store, Benaroya Hall, the Seattle Central Library designed by Rem Koolhaas, and the main building of the Seattle Art Museum (built 1991, expanded 2007), the main facade of which was designed by Robert Venturi. Downtown parks include Westlake Park, Freeway Park, and Victor Steinbrueck Park. The Olympic Sculpture Park was completed on the Belltown waterfront in January 2007. Downtown is also home to the landmark Pike Place Market, the oldest continually operating farmers' market in the United States and the core of activity in the area.

The neighborhood had dozens of street clocks in the early 20th century to advertise businesses; by 1950, only 24 were left in the entire city. As of 2024, downtown has four remaining street clocks.

== History ==
After abandoning "New York Alki", the Denny Party moved across the then-named Duwamish Bay in April 1852 to a low level marsh situated with a safe deep water harbor, located roughly in the city's Pioneer Square district. They named this new frontier "Duwamps". In the late 1850s, present day downtown Seattle became the main residential outskirts of the city. After the Great Seattle Fire, the business district was moved to the area. Several of the city's hills around downtown were regraded starting around 1876.

== Expansion ==
With about 65,000 people living in Seattle's core neighborhoods as of 2015, the downtown area's population is growing. Downtown saw a 10 percent increase in the number of occupied housing units and an 8 percent increase in population between 2010 and 2014, outpacing growth in the city as a whole. As of the end of 2014, there were 32 apartment and 2 condominium projects under construction, representing over 5,000 units.

In 1989, building heights in Downtown and adjoining Seattle suburbs were tightly restricted following a voter initiative. These restrictions were dramatically loosened in 2006, leading to the increase in high-rise construction. This policy change has divided commentators between those who support the increased density and those who criticize it as "Manhattanization."

As of 2018, Downtown Seattle has 82,000 residents and 300,000 jobs, including 48,000 added since 2010 in the Denny Triangle area. The downtown area has 71 million square feet (6,600,000 m^{2}) of office space, representing 79 percent of citywide inventory and 55 percent of commercial properties in the city. Office construction continues apace in Downtown Seattle, with 6.4 million square feet (590,000 m^{2}) planned to open in 2019, along with 161 projects.

As of 2024, Downtown Seattle's residential population reached 108,488 residents, representing a 78 percent increase since 2010.

== Economy ==
Downtown Seattle is the largest employment center in the Puget Sound region, with an estimated employee population of 317,579 in 2025, accounting for half of the city's jobs and 21 percent of King County jobs. There are several Fortune 500 companies headquartered in Downtown Seattle, including Amazon, Nordstrom, and Expeditors International. South Korean online retailer Coupang moved their headquarters from Seoul to Downtown Seattle in 2022.

Downtown Seattle is a major tourism destination. In 2024, the area welcomed nearly 10 million unique domestic visitors, representing a 3 percent increase over 2023. Downtown hotels sold more than 4 million room nights in 2024, the highest level since 2019.

== Government and infrastructure ==
The United States Postal Service operates the Seattle Main Post Office (also known as the Midtown Post Office) at 301 Union Street at Third Avenue. Seattle City Hall is located at 600 4th Ave, adjacent to the King County Courthouse. Downtown is serviced by the Downtown Seattle Transit Tunnel, which carries Link light rail trains between Westlake and Chinatown–International District. The terminus for the Seattle Center Monorail is located at Westlake Center. A large number of bus lines also run through; those operated by Metro were previously free of charge while in the now-defunct Ride Free Area. Other buses from the suburbs operated by Sound Transit Express and Community Transit also terminate in downtown.
