= Gertrude Hawk Chocolates =

Chocolate company based in Dunmore, Pennsylvania

Gertrude Hawk Chocolates, Inc.
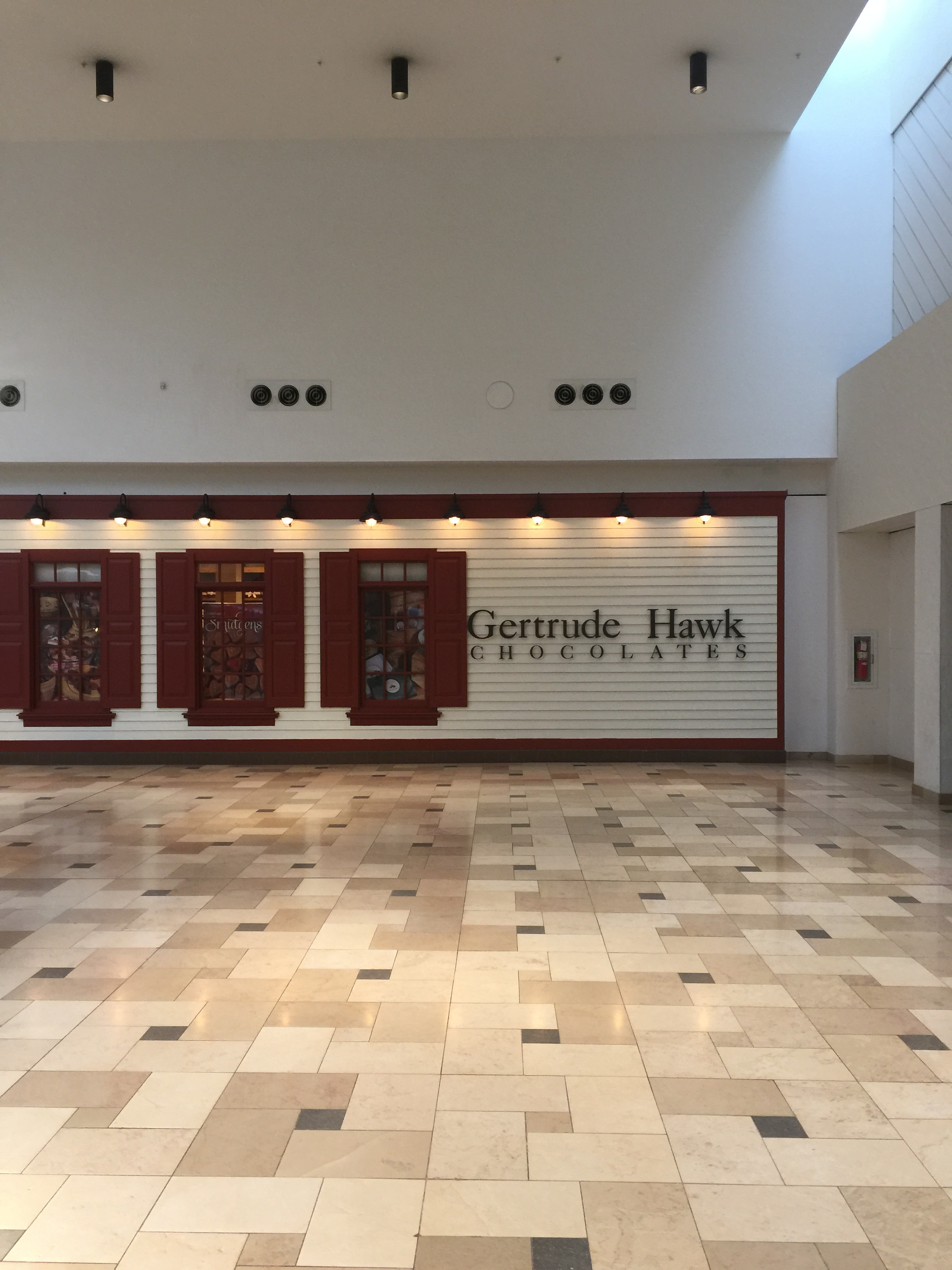
- Gertrude Hawk store in the Exton Square Mall
- Company type: Private
- Industry: Chocolate and candy manufacturer
- Founded: 1936 in Scranton, Pennsylvania, U.S.
- Founder: Gertrude Jones Hawk
- Headquarters: Dunmore, Pennsylvania, U.S.
- Number of locations: 28 stores
- Area served: Pennsylvania, New Jersey, New York
- Number of employees: 550
- Website: GertrudeHawkChocolates.com

Gertrude Hawk Chocolates is a chocolate company based in Dunmore, Pennsylvania.

== History ==
The company was started by Gertrude Jones Hawk in 1936. Hawk began her career at the age of 12 after the death of her father. She took a job in a candy shop and later began making chocolates in the kitchen of her home in Scranton, Pennsylvania. Following World War II, her son Elmer Hawk invested his service pay in the fledgling business enabling the family to purchase mechanical chocolate making equipment. The family also used their products in fundraising sales through area churches and schools.

In 1959, the Pennsylvania Department of Transportation took Gertrude's home for an Interstate 81 bridge. The family bought a piece of land in Dunmore, Pennsylvania and built a factory there that opened in 1962. In addition to the factory, the building housed a full-service restaurant and a retail area. The restaurant was converted into a candy shop in 1973. In 1988, the company constructed the Gertrude Hawk Corporate Center. The company is now a $90 million annual business with four divisions. It employs over 1,000 people and operates 75 Gertrude Hawk Chocolates Chocolate Shops throughout Pennsylvania, New Jersey and New York.

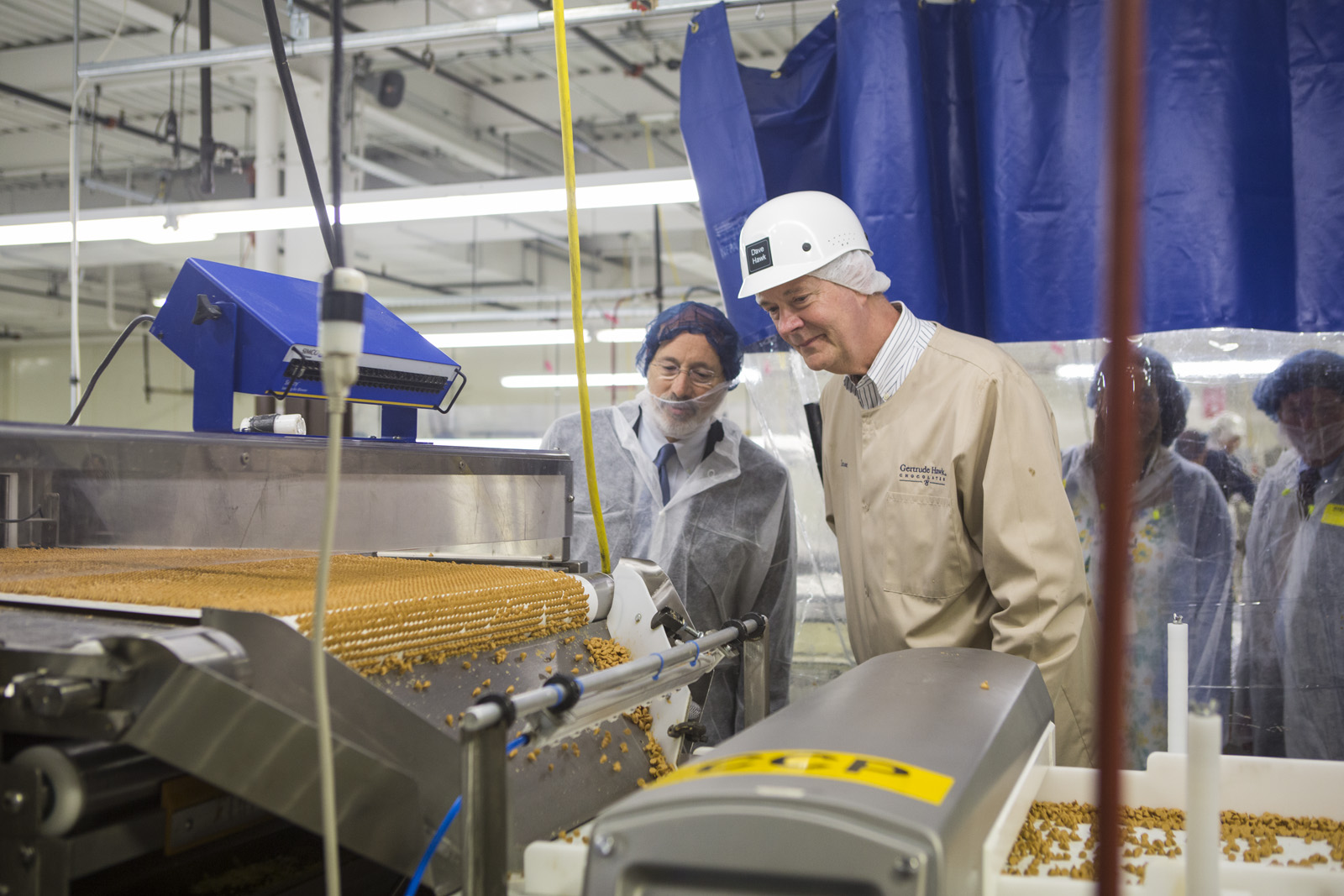
Former Pennsylvania governor Tom Wolf visiting the Gertrude Hawk Chocolates plant in June 2017

Gertrude Hawk manufactures Frangos, and inclusions for several companies such as Ben and Jerry's and Turkey Hill Dairy. In February 2008, the company produced a limited edition ice cream flavor with Turkey Hill called Gertrude Hawk Box of Chocolates which featured three different Gertrude Hawk produced chocolates in milk chocolate flavored ice cream. The company also supplies chocolates and confections to Frango, The Hershey Company, Nestle and Fannie May.

In 2017, Gertrude Hawk Chocolates sold its ingredients division, responsible for making chocolate inclusions for ice cream and other manufacturers, to Barry Callebaut, a global chocolate producer, and shifted its strategic focus on the branded retail and fundraising chocolate business. Following the sale, Gertrude Hawk also moved its brand chocolate production to a newly renovated facility.

Elmer Hawk died on October 18, 2013, at 89 years old after coming down with an illness. He was the CEO of the company from 1979 until 1992, when his son David took over from him.

In 2018, Gertrude Hawk, the company's founder, was inducted into the Candy Hall of Fame.
