= Frango =

Brand of chocolate truffles

- As a Marshall Field's licensee, Macy's created a Pacific Northwest version of the Frango logo still used today across the country.

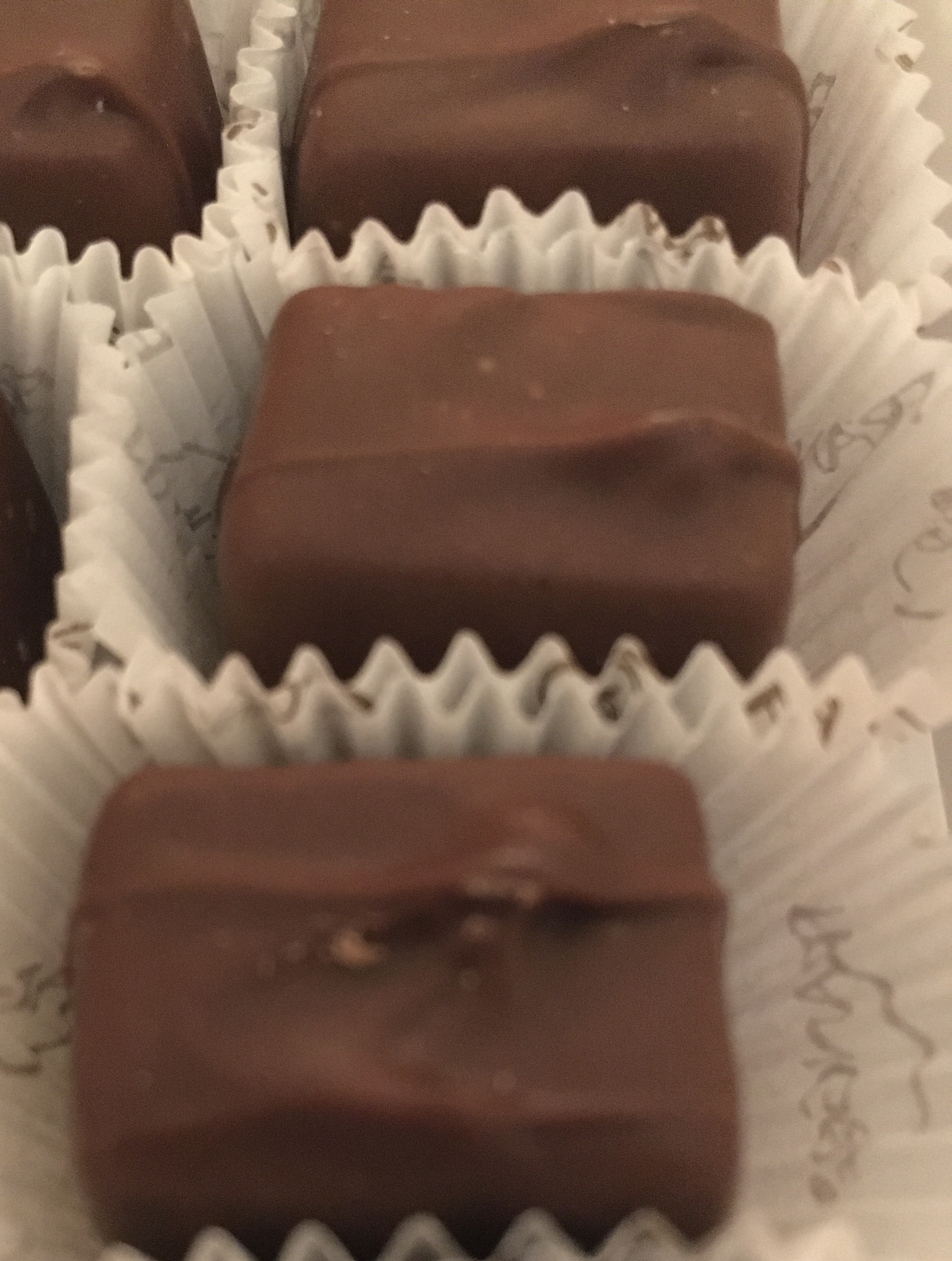
- A close-up of Frango mints, in packaging
- Product type: Chocolate truffle
- Current owner: Garrett Popcorn Shops
- Country: United States
- Introduced: 1918
- Previous owners: Frederick & Nelson
- Website: Frango Chocolate on Garrett

Frango mints are a brand of chocolate truffles first created for the Frederick & Nelson department stores. Traditionally flavored with mint and widely popularized by the Marshall Field and Company department store, they were later produced and distributed by Macy's department stores. Frango is also the brand name of a line of various other related food products.

Historically associated with the Midwestern and Pacific Northwest regions of the United States, the candy is sold in various outlets throughout the country. Frangos were created by Seattle, Washington's Frederick & Nelson department store in 1918; the company and Frango trademarks were both acquired by Chicago's Marshall Field's department store, which introduced its recipe in 1929. Frango mints were produced in large melting pots on the 13th floor of the flagship Marshall Field's store on State Street for 70 years.

In the beginning of 2017, Garrett Popcorn Shops acquired the rights to sell Frango from Macy's. While the department store continues to sell their own version. Presently, the company has been developing, creating, selling, and distributing Frango chocolate with a refreshed image in its boutiques and online.

== Origins ==
The origins of Frango mints go back to 1918, according to a trademark document from the U.S. Patent Office. Originally, the Frango was the name for a frozen dessert sold at the sophisticated Tea Room at Frederick & Nelson's department store, at Sixth Avenue and Pine Street in Seattle, Washington. The first Frango frozen dessert was available in maple and orange flavors. There are a few different theories as to the origins of the Frango name. One theory is originated by the combination of "Fr" from Frederick’s and the "ango" from the word tango. Employees trained at Frederick and Nelson were taught that the name was an acronym for FRederick And Nelson COmpany. The C was changed to a G since Franco suggested a different meaning. Some have also said that Frango is a portmanteau for FRederick And Nelson GOodness.

A much-repeated theory—repeated, at times even by people very close to the stores concerned—states that Frederick & Nelson originally called the chocolates Franco Mints. In the 1930s, after Frederick & Nelson's was acquired by Marshall Field's, the name was changed to Frango mints after the Spanish Civil War, when Generalísimo Franco met with Hitler, to avoid similarities to the Spanish dictator's name. However, Frederick & Nelson is said to have filed an application on June 1, 1918, to register Frango as a trademark.

In 1926, the consistency of the Frango Dessert was described as flaky, requiring the use of a fork, not a spoon as you would use with ice cream. The Frango name eventually was extended to ice-cream sodas, pies and milkshakes sold at the store. It wasn't until 1927 that Ray Alden, who ran Frederick's in-store candy kitchen, developed the Frango mint meltaway chocolate. Alden's secret recipe used chocolate made from both African and South American cocoa beans as well as triple-distilled oil of Oregon peppermint and 40% local butter.

== Two forms ==
A few months after Marshall Field's agreed to buy out Frederick & Nelson's and take control of the Seattle company in 1929, the Frederick & Nelson candy makers in Seattle were summoned to Chicago to introduce Frango mints to Marshall Field's to help build slumping sales during the Great Depression. Soon, the candy kitchen at Marshall Field's had produced its own Midwestern interpretation of the Frango Chocolate recipe. Although the Northwest version still uses the original Frederick & Nelson recipe, the Marshall Field's recipe has been modified a few times. This, as well as the use of different ingredients and equipment, would account for any difference in taste between the two versions.

=== Packaging variations ===
One crucial distinction between the two types of Frango chocolates is the packaging. Midwestern Frango chocolates are sold in traditional flat candy boxes, with the chocolates set in candy papers. By contrast, Northwest Frango chocolates are individually wrapped and sold in distinctive hexagon-shaped boxes.

== Seattle changes ==
=== Frederick & Nelson shuts down ===
During Marshall Field's many decades of stewardship over the Frederick & Nelson chain of stores, Field's preserved the Frederick & Nelson name and regional character. However, the 1982 purchase of Marshall Field's by BATUS Retail Group (a unit of BATUS Inc.) proved ill-fated for the Frederick & Nelson subsidiary. By 1986, an overstretched BATUS decided to dispose of Frederick & Nelson, selling it and Spokane, Washington-based retailer The Crescent to a Washington state-based investor group. Despite this ownership turmoil, Frederick's continued to distribute Frangos, albeit under license from Field's. In 1992, continued financial difficulties led to the final closure of all Frederick's locations. By that time, Field's itself had changed hands, becoming a unit of Minneapolis-based Dayton Hudson Corporation. Seattle civic leaders quickly engineered a deal under which Dayton Hudson agreed to let Seattle's remaining full-line department store, The Bon Marché, continue to sell Frangos in the northwest.

=== Seattle Gourmet Foods ===
This solution proved highly problematic. While Frederick & Nelson was still in business, the candies were made on the 10th floor of the chain's flagship Pine Street store. After Frederick & Nelson's demise, a former Frango candymaker founded Seattle Gourmet Foods, which won a production contract with The Bon and moved candymaking to a new site. Seattle Gourmet manufactured the meltaways using much of the same equipment Frederick & Nelson used to manufacture the mints.

=== Bon Marché files suit ===
After ten years of using Seattle Gourmet Foods to manufacture the chocolates, The Bon Marché terminated the contract in early 2003. The candymaker retaliated by producing its own line of "Frederick & Nelson Fine Chocolates," using hexagonal packaging similar to that of the traditional Frangos box. The Bon Marché promptly sued, but Seattle Gourmet Foods countersued, claiming that the contract termination was unlawful. Late in 2004, the parties reached a settlement in which The Bon Marché made an undisclosed payment to Seattle Gourmet Foods, in exchange for exclusive rights to the recipe, the use of hexagonal boxes, and the Frederick & Nelson and F&N names.

=== Bon Marché, Bon-Macy's, Macy's ===
Today the Pacific Northwest version of Frango Chocolates is sold at Macy's Northwest locations in Washington, Idaho, Montana and Oregon. This is as a result of Federated Department Stores unifying all its regional department stores under the single Macy's banner. Another local Seattle company, Seattle Chocolate Company, now makes the Frango chocolates for Macy's Northwest.

== Chicago changes ==
Marshall Field's diversified (nine flavors; and "Frango bars, ice cream toppings, mint liqueur, liqueur cakes, coffee, cocoa, cookies and cookie mix") and merchandised the Frango name (branded hats, shirts, and so forth).

=== Marshall Field's candy kitchen shuts down ===
The Midwest version had been produced on the 13th floor of the Marshall Field's flagship State Street store from 1929 until March 1999. However, demand for the chocolates overwhelmed the in-house facility; consequently, then corporate owner Dayton-Hudson Corp. handed over the production contract for Frangos to Gertrude Hawk Chocolates in Dunmore, Pennsylvania and closed the Field's candy kitchen, letting go virtually all of the candy kitchen's employees. This infuriated many Chicagoans and enraged Chicago Mayor Richard M. Daley, who sought to have the by-then iconic chocolates made by a local Chicago company.

=== Gertrude Hawk production process ===
The process begins using giant blocks of Chicago's own Blommer chocolate, melted at nearly 200 °F (93 °C). Tiny rectangular molds receive the combination of milk and dark chocolate, plus a special mint oil, after the mixture is tempered to 83 °F (28 °C). Air bubbles are eliminated by shaking the molds. The product is cooled via a trip through a long, refrigerated tunnel. The chocolates are then sent through an enrobing machine, where more chocolate is poured over them. The Frango mints are cooled once again, then boxed by hand, sealed, wrapped and packaged for shipment.

== From Marshall Field's to Macy's ==
In 2004, Marshall Field's and the Frango trademark were acquired by St. Louis-based May Department Store Company. Field's new owner, the May stores, refused to renew Macy's license to the Frango trademark. As a result, Macy's Northwest re-branded the Northwest version of Frango as "Frederick & Nelson, the Original" in February 2005. On August 30, 2005, Macy's corporate owner, Federated Department Stores, completed its acquisition of the May Stores. As a result, a license was no longer needed for Macy's Northwest to use the Frango name. The acquisition reunited the two branches of the Frango family for the first time in two decades. Macy's Northwest promptly renamed the Northwest version of the mint meltaways as "Frango."

=== Return to Chicago? ===
Because of controversial and very public protests from former Marshall Field's customers and Chicago Mayor Daley, Federated chairman Terry J. Lundgren announced in September 2005 that Macy's would look into moving production back to Chicago. In making the announcement, Lundgren noted that Macy's would look into "our contractual obligations" to determine if the chocolate production could be moved back to the Windy City; however, Lundgren stressed that he was not making any promises regarding moving all or part of the production back to Chicago.

Unfortunately, the demand for Marshall Field's Frango mints was far greater than demand for Macy's Frangos. No longer a unique product of Chicago's famed Marshall Field's, the Macy's-branded Frangos are viewed as just another mint; at 75% off retail, sales of Frango mints under Macy's remain significantly below previous years' sales at Marshall Field's. However, this may also be due to Chicagoans' hostility to Federated, Macy's and Lundgren in particular over the demise of the Marshall Field's stores and the way the stores changed after their absorption into Macy's, becoming middle-tier retailers rather than the high-end competitor that the Marshall Field's stores had been during much of the 20th century. Macy's is considered to be a lower-tier retail chain than Federated's own top-tier retailer Bloomingdale's; the folding of the Field's stores into Macy's was seen by Chicagoans as both a demotion of a 150-year-old Chicago institution and an insult to the city itself, and critics urged a boycott of Macy's after the Macy's takeover.

In July 2009, Macy's announced that Chicago candymaker Cupid Candies would begin production of one-pound boxes of Frango mint chocolates. Cupid Candies is a 73-year-old Chicago candy maker located on the city's south side. Frango mints made by Cupid Candies will be shipped to Chicago-area Macy's stores. All other Frango candies, as well as Frango cookies, will continue to be made by Gertrude Hawk Chocolates, located in Pennsylvania. However, the contract with Cupid Candies, though cheered locally, may be a case of too little, too late for Federated as Macy's sales figures, including those for Frango mints, continued to stagnate or slump even before the Great Recession had begun.

==== State Street viewing kitchen reopening ====
Around the same time as the Cupid Candies deal, the Frango Viewing Kitchen on the seventh floor of Chicago's Macy's On State Street, which had closed in 1999 when Frango production was moved to Pennsylvania, was reopened. The kitchen allows store guests to see the enrobing process where Frango chocolate centers are covered in chocolate to create the outside layer. These enrobed chocolates are later used for sampling.

== Only at Macy's ==
By 2006, the Midwest version of Frango chocolates and related items became available for sale online on the Macy's website. In the former Bon Marché stores, Macy's sells the Northwest version of the chocolates, while the Midwest version is sold elsewhere nationwide.

In the Northwest, Frango chocolates are sold in various flavors, with seasonal flavors added year round. During Christmas time, Macy's Northwest sells a stuffed Frango teddy bear and various other gift packages. In 2006, gift packages with a Frango mug, drinking chocolate, biscotti and a box of Frango chocolates were sold.

In continuing the Marshall Field's tradition, Macy's North sells the entire line of Frango products. Along with the classic mint Frangos, chocolates featuring other flavors, special edition Frangos, coffee, hot chocolate, truffles, cookies, and liqueurs are among the products sold under the Frango brand. In 2006, Macy's announced that famed Chicago cheesecake baker Eli's Cheesecake would once again produce Frango cheesecake for sale in the Macy's North region stores; Eli's had previously made Frango mint cheesecakes for Marshall Field's during the 1980s.

Also as part of the seventh floor food offerings at Marshall Field's on State Street is the Frango Café, which features sandwiches and salads along with other sweet treats.

== Garrett's Frango ==
In 2017 the Chicago staple of local popcorn Garrett's Popcorn bought the rights to the Marshall Fields recipe of Frango mints. Although the ultimate goal for Frango under Garrett's name is unknown, a few pop up stores around Chicago have been seen selling Frango chocolates with the "Creamy and minty" recipe of Marshall Fields that has been missed for so long in Chicago. The chocolate is also made near Chicago in Elgin, a suburb west from the stores which have been seen in Rosemont, O'Hare Airport, Water Tower Place, Navy Pier and Northbridge Mall. Update: All locations have closed.

== In popular culture ==
In season 5 of The Bear, the dessert mints served at the restaurant were an homage to Frango mints from Marshall Field's.

== Gallery ==
=== Marshall Field's packaging ===
The Marshall Field's packaging is featured on boxes sold today by Macy's in the Midwestern region of the United States. Candies featuring the Marshall Field's signature logo are made using a variation of the 1929 recipe created by the department store. The retention of the Field's packaging in the Midwest is thought to be an attempt to regain favor with lost customers still loyal to the Marshall Field's brand; it's unclear that this strategy has worked for Macy's, although changing the packaging to feature the Macy's name instead would probably result in yet another uproar for the beleaguered chain.

=== Macy's packaging ===
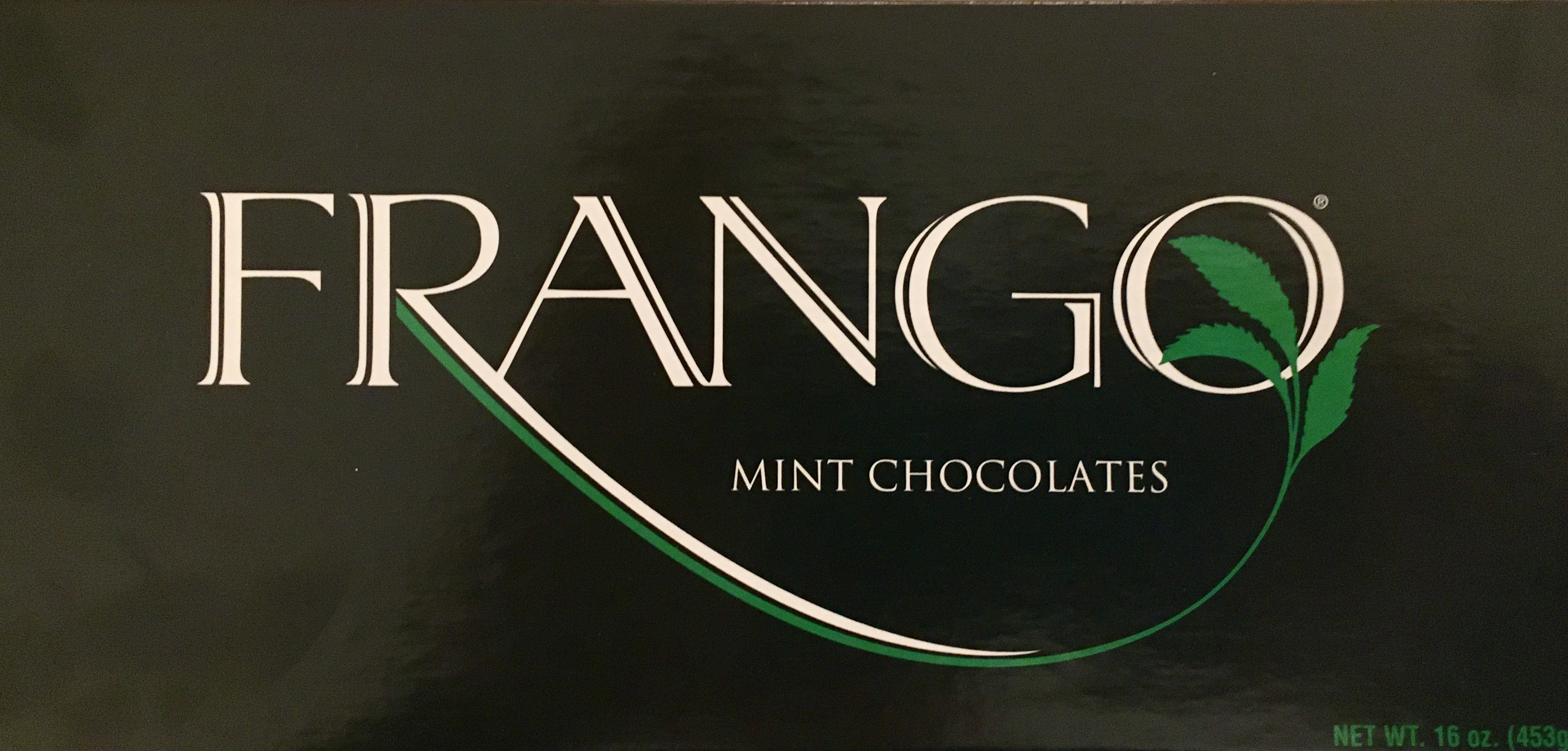
A box of Frango mints, as sold by Macy’s

Designed when Macy's was just a licensee to sell the Frango brand, its distinct logo graced the packaging of candies sold in the Pacific Northwest. After Macy's acquired the Frango brand from the owners of Marshall Field's, Macy's continued use of the logo. Candies packaged in this style use the original Frederick & Nelson recipe.

== See also ==
- Mint chocolate
