= Johan Erik Lindh =

Swedish painter (1793–1865)

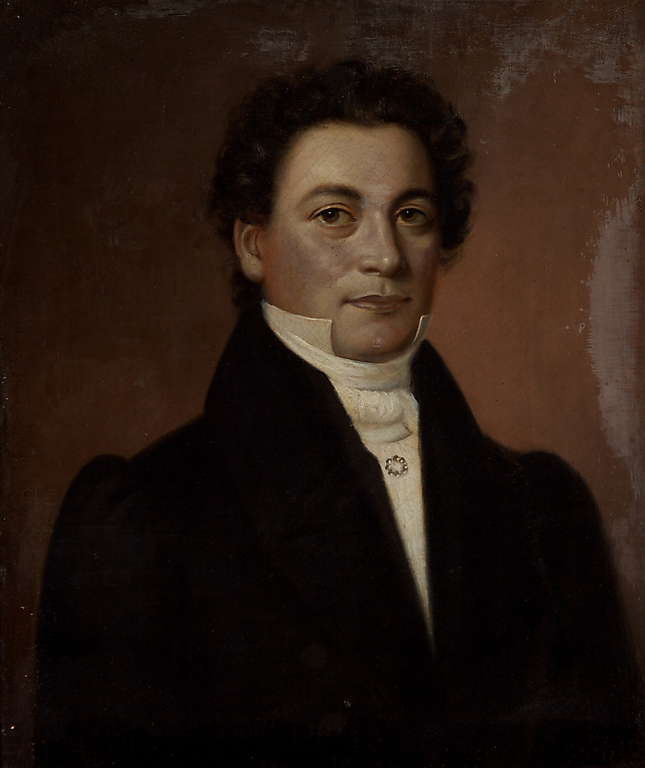
- Self-portrait, 1834
- Born: 11 October 1793; Roslagen, Sweden
- Died: 21 January 1865 (aged 71); Helsinki, Grand Duchy of Finland, Russian Empire
- Occupation: Painter

Johan Erik Lindh (11 October 1793 – 21 January 1865) was a Swedish painter and a former decorative painter who moved to Finland.

== Biography ==
Lindh was born in Roslagen, the son of a soldier, Erik Lindh, and his wife Maja Greta Lindh. He married Hedvig Kristina Liljeberg. He studied at the Royal Swedish Academy of Arts in Stockholm. He graduated in 1814 and worked as a painter's apprentice.

He moved in 1817 to Kokkola and adorned the Vaasa Court of Appeal with paintings. In 1827, Granberg moved from Turku to Helsinki. During the 1830s he was one of the few artists that could support himself with his work. He also taught. One of his students was Edla Blommér.

His works were exhibited for the first time in 1847. Some of his works can be found at the Nationalmuseum, the Helsinki City Art Museum, and the Turku Historical Museum. He painted church altarpieces in Kokkola, Oravais, and Tenala. He also painted a number of portraits. He died in Helsinki.

== Gallery ==
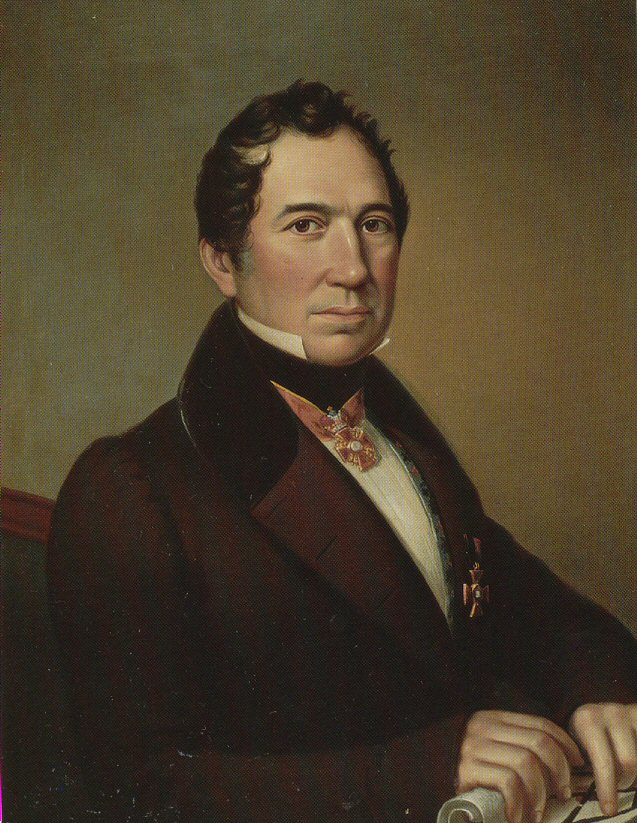
Portrait of Johan Carl Ludvig Engel

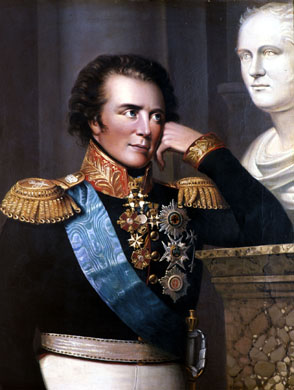
Portrait of Gustaf Mauritz Armfelt by Johan Erik Lindh, based on the original by Carl Fredrik von Breda, Helsinki University Museum, 1845

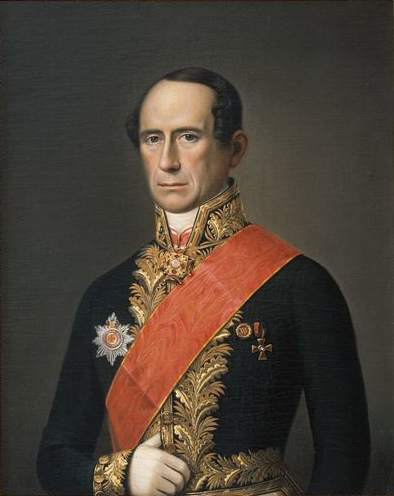
Portrait of Carl Gustaf Mannerheim, 1849–1851

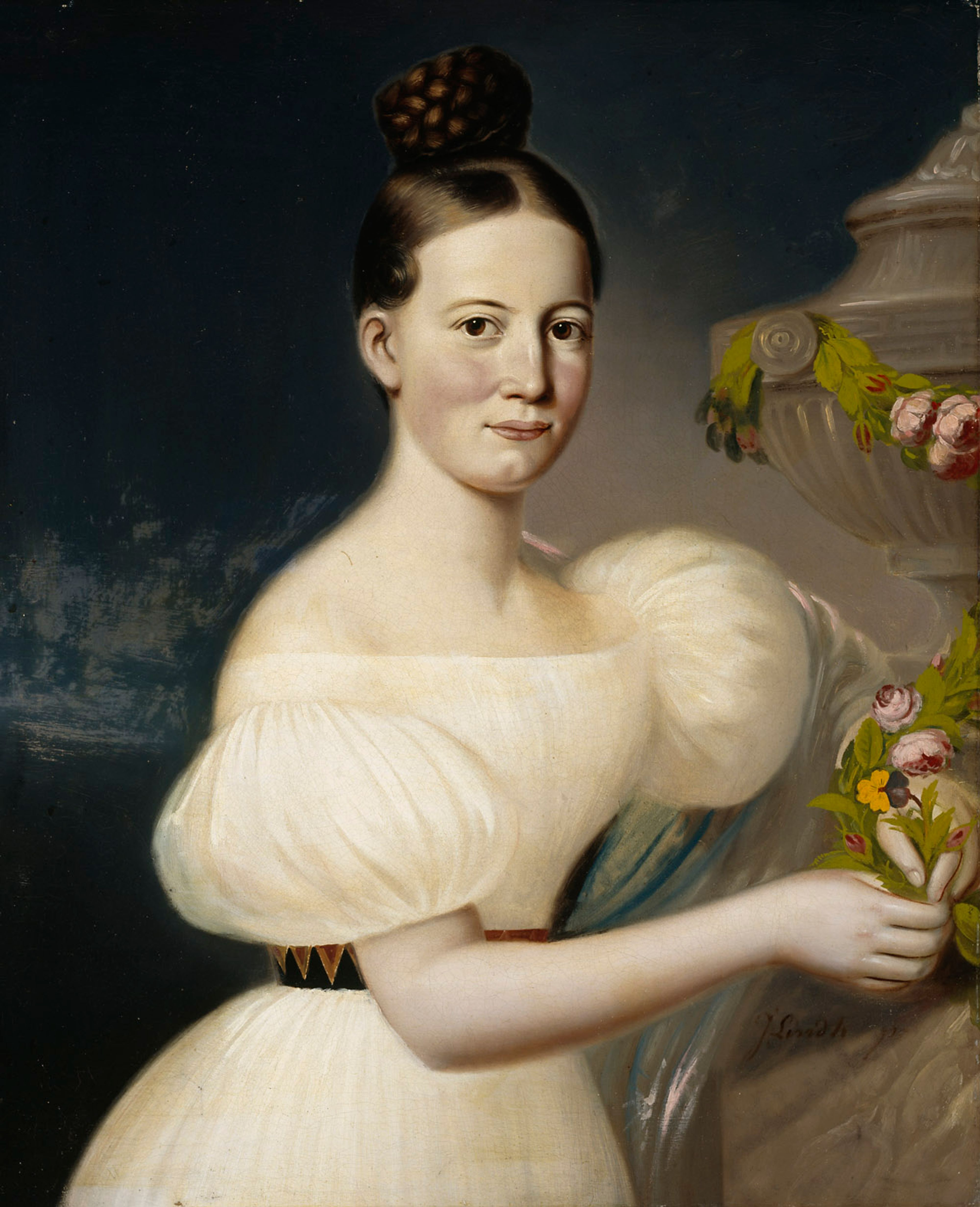
Portrait of Eva Törngren

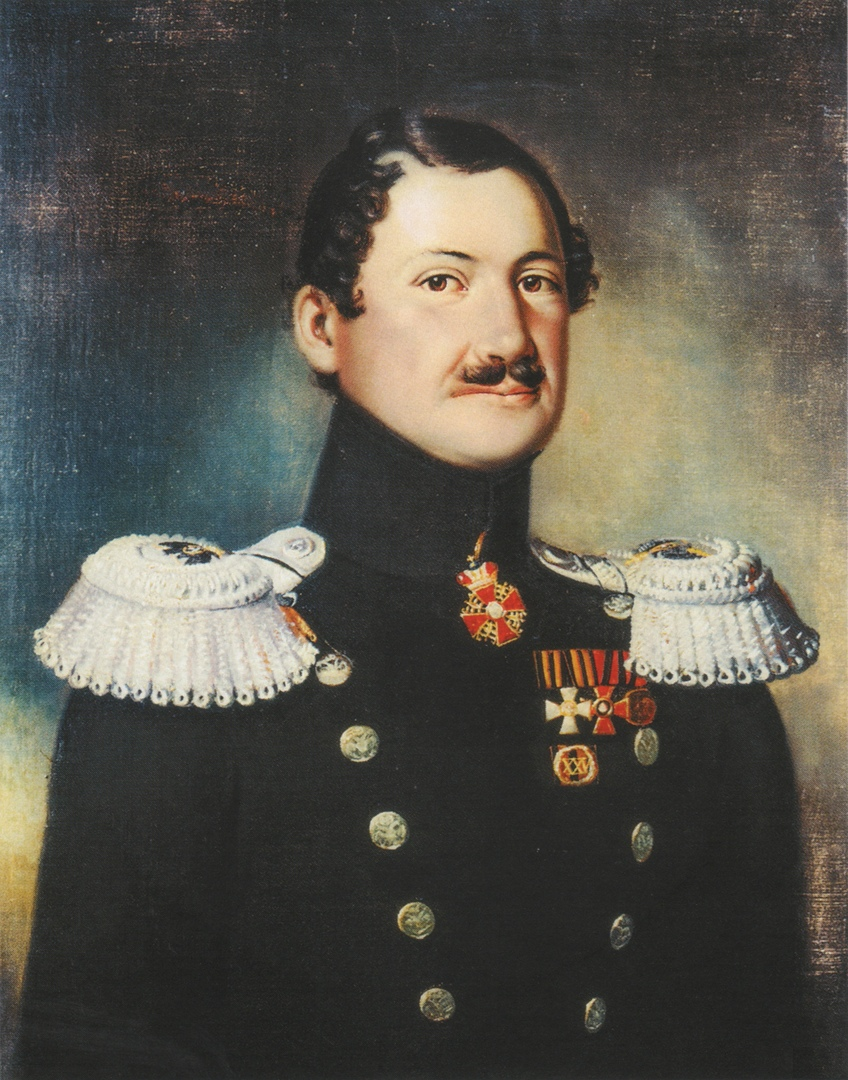
Portrait of Alexander Franzevich von Reinecke (1796–1870), navy captain, brother of Michael Reinecke

== Sources ==
- Johan Erik Lindh, from the Nordisk familjebok (1912)
