= Frederick & Nelson =

American department store chain

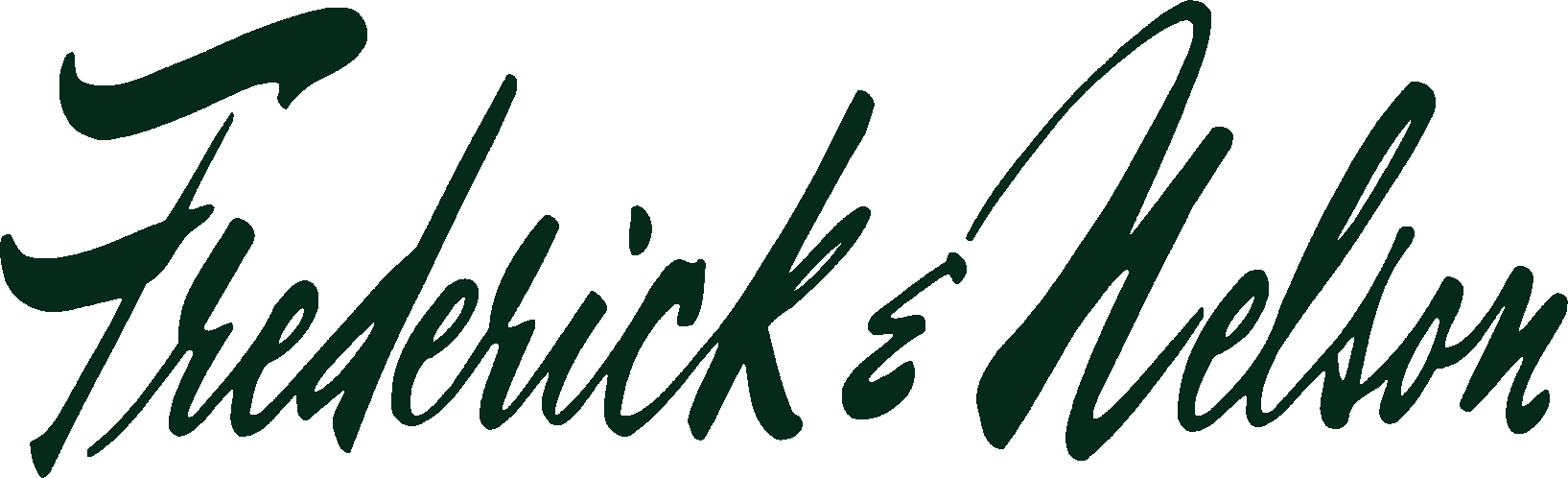

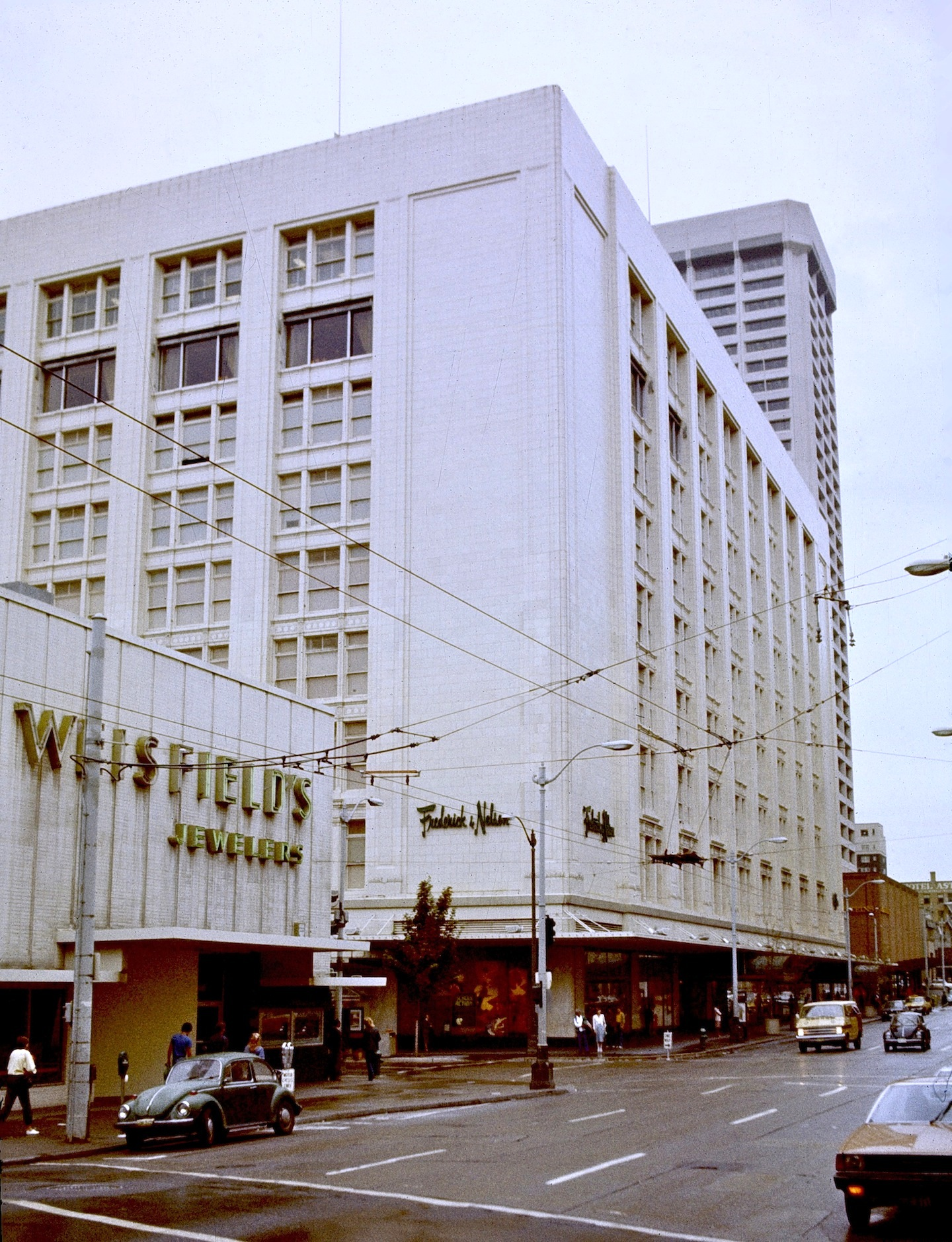
- Exterior of the flagship store (1982)
- Company type: Subsidiary
- Industry: Retail
- Genre: Department stores
- Founded: 1890; 136 years ago in Seattle, Washington, United States
- Founders: Donald E. Frederick; James Mecham
- Defunct: 1992; 34 years ago
- Fate: Bankruptcy and liquidation
- Headquarters: Seattle, Washington, United States
- Number of locations: 10 (at peak, 1980)
- Area served: Oregon; Washington
- Key people: Nels B. Nelson (partner)
- Products: Clothing; furniture; carpeting; housewares; Frango
- Parent: Marshall Field's (1929–1986); Batus Inc. (1986–1992)

Frederick & Nelson was a department store chain in the northwestern United States, based in Seattle, Washington. Founded in 1890 as a furniture store, it later expanded to sell other types of merchandise. The company was acquired by Marshall Field & Company in 1929. By 1980, the Frederick & Nelson chain had expanded to 10 stores in two states (Washington and Oregon). The company filed for bankruptcy and went out of business in 1992. Its former Seattle flagship store building is now occupied by the flagship Nordstrom store.

== History ==
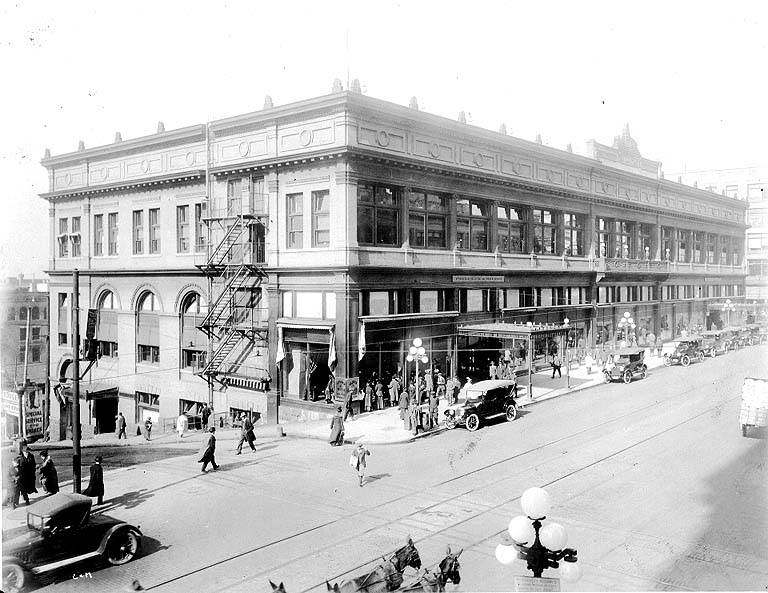
Frederick & Nelson, Rialto Building, ca. 1914

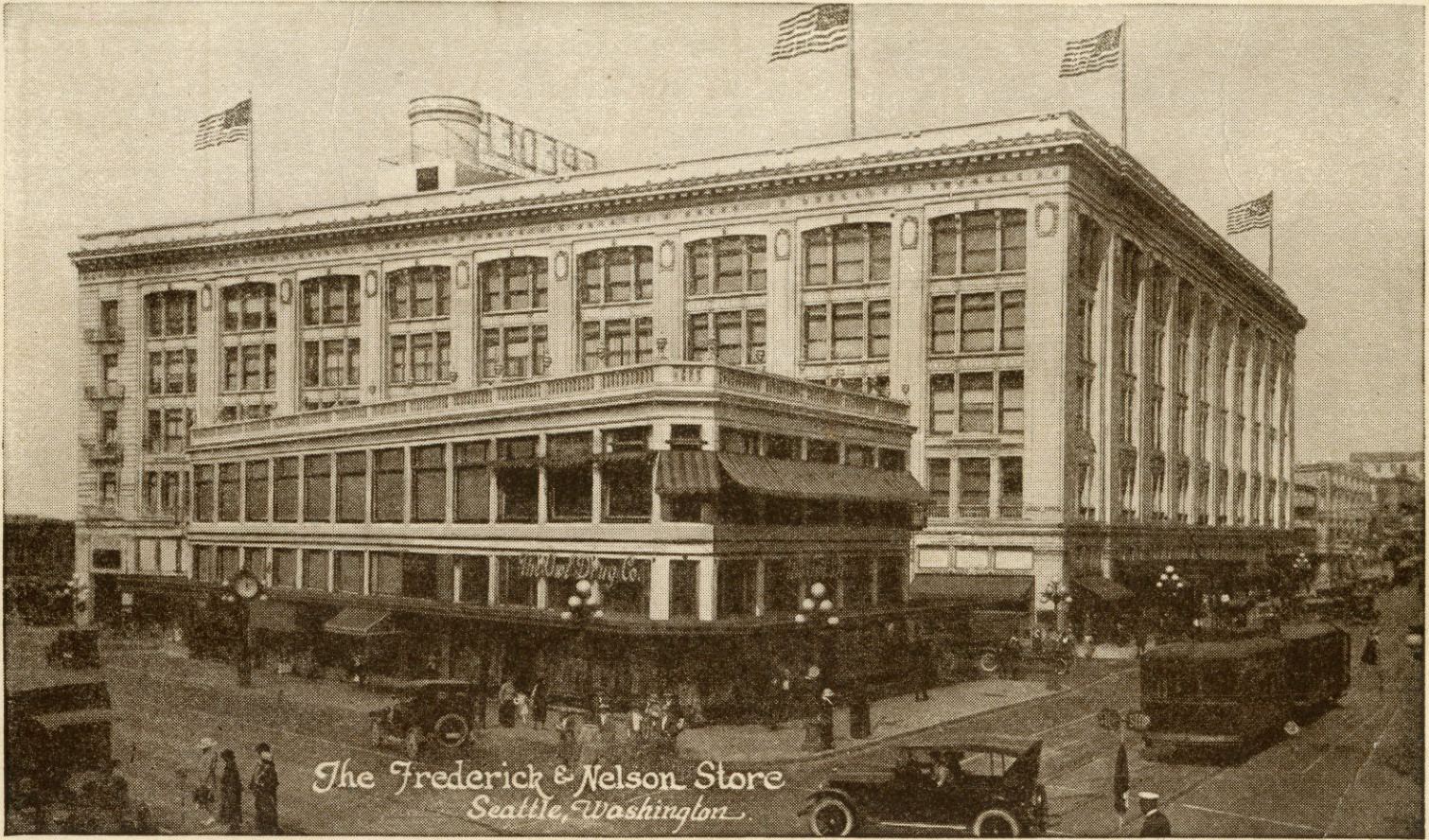
Frederick & Nelson: its flagship store, opened in 1918 in Seattle, circa 1922. It was later expanded upward by four more stories, and it remained in use until 1992.

Frederick & Nelson was the successor to a business founded by two partners, Donald E. Frederick and James Mecham, who had been mining colleagues in Colorado. They happened to connect shortly after Frederick arrived in Seattle on a steamer in 1890, and they pooled their resources to start a second-hand furniture business.

After setting up shop in several locations, the business was named "J. G. Mecham and Co." Some time later another mining colleague, Nels B. Nelson, arrived also from Colorado. He subsequently purchased a one-third interest in the business. Several months later, due to ill health, Mecham sold his interest to the two remaining partners and the name was changed to "Frederick & Nelson." They vowed to create the largest and finest store west of the Mississippi and north of San Francisco. Early customers included the local Native Americans and a thriving populace invigorated by the news that Seattle would become the western terminus for the Great Northern Railway.

In 1891, the partners acquired the Queen City Furniture Company and began selling new furniture. Their motto was, "What our customers want, we will give them. Service is our motto." Their sincerity was tested when just before closing time on a snowy Christmas Eve in 1890, a customer came in to purchase a second-hand rocking chair for his wife for Christmas, requiring it to be delivered that night. Frederick and Nelson sloshed through the snow to the top of Denny Hill to deliver the heavy chair, making the first delivery in the history of Frederick & Nelson. Legend has it that their first credit customer was a Native American woman who coveted a second-hand parlor stove. The stove was hers for weekly payments of berries, a woven mat, and a sweet grass basket.

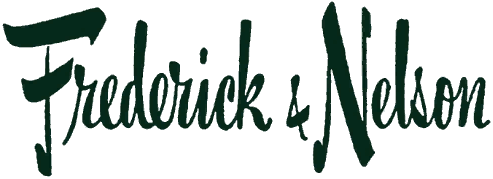
Classic logo

The Klondike Gold Rush around the start of the 20th century fueled further growth of Seattle. There was a growing demand for fine furnishings in the blossoming hotel business as well as in the fine homes of the city's inhabitants. Their simple philosophy was, "If a customer asks for it, get it, and if enough people want the same thing, start a department." There were departments for furniture, carpeting, housewares, china, and draperies. They even had a mattress factory.

Frederick & Nelson purchased the assets of the Pacific Carpet Company in 1897 and the company was consolidated with Silas Munro's New England Furniture Store and the name changed again to Frederick, Nelson and Munro.

Munro was leery of rapid expansion, and he soon parted company with Frederick & Nelson. In 1907, the ailing Nels Nelson was returning from a trip to a medical spa in Bohemia and died at sea. Frederick was left to run the entire operation.

Expansion plans were made in 1914 for a brand-new building six stories tall with a seventh floor in the basement. Despite a shortage of building materials that were needed elsewhere to fight the First World War, the building opened the day after Labor Day on September 3, 1918, at Pine Street and Fifth Avenue. Over 25,000 shoppers and guests made it through the doors that day. Frederick was forward-thinking enough to make the foundation strong enough to hold ten stories. Even though businessmen and financiers branded the project "Frederick's Folly", his dream was finally realized three decades later.

=== Marshall Field ===
At the age of 69 in 1929, D. E. Frederick decided to retire, and he sold the store to Marshall Field and Company for $6 million (~$86 million in 2024). He was most impressed with the policies of Marshall Field and had even patterned Frederick & Nelson after Marshall Field and Company. They signed a 99-year lease that would pay Frederick (and later his estate) $100,000 a year.

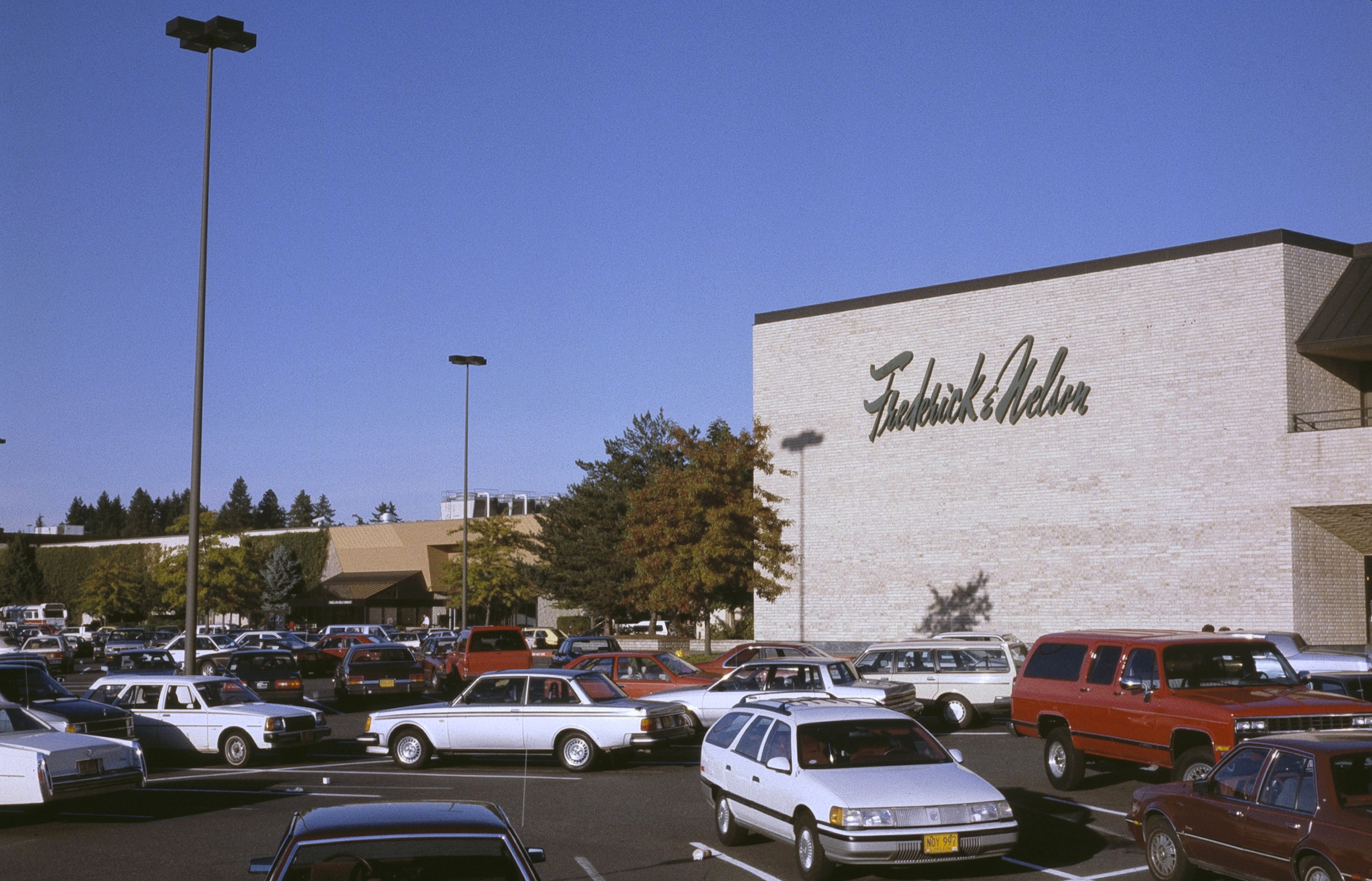
During its final two decades, the Frederick & Nelson chain included several large stores at suburban shopping malls, such as Washington Square, in the west-side suburbs of Portland, Oregon.

In 1943, Frederick & Nelson opened a satellite store at Boeing Field at the Boeing Airplane Company's Number 2 Plant. They supported the war effort and built a loyalty among the airplane manufacturer's 47,000 employees. Frederick's also established a "Victory Post" on the main floor of the Seattle store, selling War Bonds and stamps. Frederick's was one of a handful of stores in the nation to receive a U.S. Treasury Department T-Flag. The T-Flag signified that more than 90 percent of the employees invested at least 10 percent of their earnings in War Bonds. D. E. Frederick's dreams for expansion of the original store at Pine Street and Fifth Avenue finally were realized when the grand re-opening was celebrated August 4, 1952. There were ten floors above ground and two below. The building housed a beauty salon, post office, moving picture auditorium, a fully equipped medical facility, and a nursery. There were reading and writing rooms, and the large, elaborately furnished fifth floor tearoom could seat 400. On the tenth floor the company built a modern candy kitchen that could turn out more than 500,000 pounds of Frango chocolates a year. Later the company added a kindergarten and a children's barbershop. (The original Frederick & Nelson store reopened as Nordstrom's flagship store in 1998.)

By 1980, Frederick & Nelson had become one of the fastest growing stores in the nation, nearly quadrupling from four stores to fifteen. Marshall Field's acquired three Liberty House stores in Portland, and two in Tacoma as well as six Lipman's stores in Oregon from the Dayton Hudson Corporation. All were converted to Frederick & Nelson stores.

=== Demise ===
Ownership would change three more times in the next nine years as business went on a downward spiral. Management changes occurred in 1982 when BATUS Inc. of Louisville, Kentucky, bought all of the outstanding stock of Marshall Field and Co. BATUS Retail Group now included Marshall Field, Saks Fifth Avenue, Frederick & Nelson, Gimbels, Kohl's and a number of other department stores. By the mid-1980s they were beginning to close the Oregon stores, one Oregon location at Washington Square lasted until 1990.

BATUS sold the money-losing Frederick & Nelson to local investors in September 1986. Two stores were immediately closed - Portland and Salem Oregon. Poor management decisions led to an overabundance of lower-priced, out-of-season merchandise and large investments in inventory at the wrong prices. Additionally, the inability to pay bills on time led to late deliveries of critical merchandise and empty looking stores. No longer known for fashionable, high-end clothing, Frederick & Nelson became unable to withstand competitive pressures, particularly when the Seattle area entered a recession in the late 1980s. Fading rapidly, the chain filed for bankruptcy, entered a fatal liquidity crisis and closed for the last time in May 1992.

== Frango ==
Frango's exact year of creation and the origin of the name have been lost to history. According to a trademark document from the U.S. Patent Office, the name Frango was first officially used on June 1, 1918. A popular item on the tearoom menu was a frozen dessert called Frango, and it was available in maple and orange flavors. The name probably originated by the combination of Fran from Frederick & Nelson, and the go from the tango dance craze. In 1926, the consistency of the Frango Dessert was described as flaky, requiring the use of a fork, not a spoon, such as one would use with ice cream. Eventually the Frango dessert line included pies, ice cream sodas, and milk shakes. It was decided in 1928 or 1929 that Frederick's should offer a chocolate mint truffle. Candy maker Ray Alden is credited with developing the Frango Mint. His secret recipe called for chocolate from cocoa beans grown on the African Coast and South America, triple-distilled oil of Oregon peppermint and 40 percent butter. A few months after Frederick sold out to Marshall Field in 1929, Frederick's candy makers in Seattle were summoned to Chicago to introduce Frango chocolates to Marshall Field to help build slumping sales during the Great Depression. Soon, the candy kitchen at Marshall Field had produced their own mid-western interpretation of the Frango chocolate recipe. Frangos was produced on the 10th floor of the downtown flagship store.

Even after the store's demise, the F & N Frango lives on. In the Northwest, the candy was sold in The Bon Marché (now Macy's) as well as in Portland's Meier & Frank. Frango can still be found in Macy's stores in Seattle in their familiar hexagonal box. In addition, they are still a favourite at the Macy's stores that were formerly Dayton's, Hudson's, and Marshall Field. The "classic" Frango mint candy now exists in three varieties—the Frederick & Nelson recipe primarily available in the Pacific Northwest, the Marshall Field recipe available in Chicago area Macy's stores and produced locally, and a Marshall Field recipe produced by the Gertrude Hawk Candy Company of Dunmore, Pennsylvania for distribution at other Macy's locations. Before the acquisition by May, Marshall Field transferred all production of Frango to Gertrude Hawk; Macy's chairman, Terry Lundgren, promised a Chicago-made Frango as a concession to protests regarding the loss of the Field name.
