= Garrett Popcorn Shops =

Popcorn store

- Industry: Restaurants
- Founded: 1949; 77 years ago
- Headquarters: Chicago, Illinois, United States
- Area served: United States; Singapore; Japan; South Korea; United Arab Emirates; Bahrain; Thailand; Malaysia
- Parent: Garrett Brands
- Website: www.garrettpopcorn.com

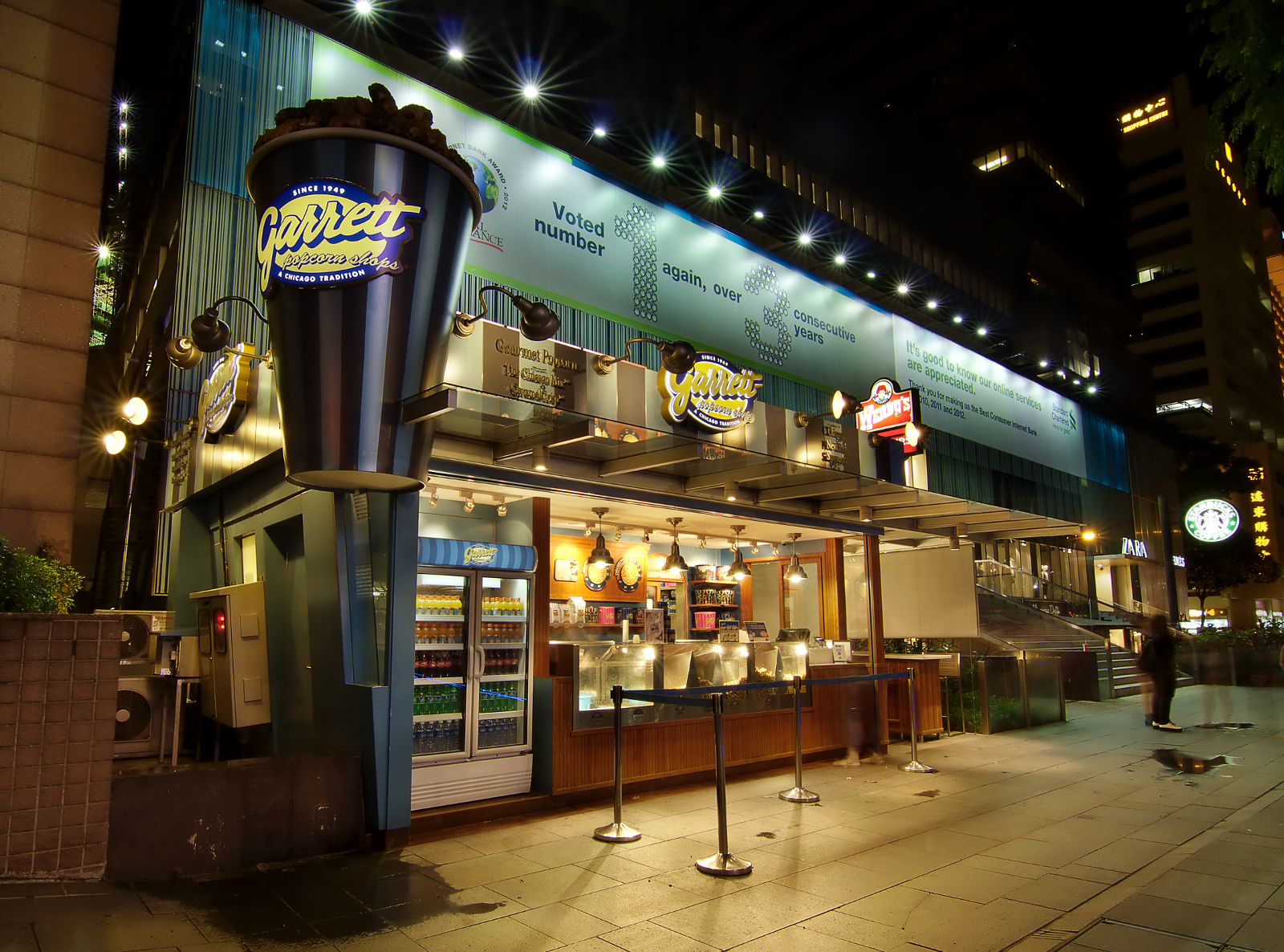
Garrett Popcorn Shops in Singapore

Garrett Popcorn Shops is an American chain of gourmet popcorn stores founded in 1949 in Chicago, Illinois. Today, it has shops in nine countries, corporate offices in Chicago, Singapore, and Tokyo, and an online store. The majority of its brick and mortar stores are still in Chicago, including shops on the Magnificent Mile and in the O'Hare International Airport. As such, it is often referenced as part of classic Chicago cuisine.

Garrett Popcorn Shops is a part of Garrett Brands, which also owns the Frango brand of chocolates.

== History ==
The first store was opened on 10 Madison Street in Chicago, Illinois in 1949 by Gladys Otto Garrett.

The recipes for several of its popcorn flavors are trade secrets that are based on family recipes.

A tin of Garrett Popcorn was named as one of Oprah's Favorite Things in 2002, leading to a more than 100% increase in sales volume in the month after publication.

Garrett's Popcorn opened locations at O'Hare International Airport terminals 3, 1, and 5 in 2008, 2009, and 2015 respectively. Another store was opened at Midway International Airport in 2023 as part of the Midway Modernization Program. A store was opened in Phoenix Sky Harbor International Airport in May of 2025.

Garrett Brands, the owner of Garrett Popcorn Shops acquired the rights to Frango from Macy's, Inc in 2017.

== Flavors ==
- CaramelCrisp
- CheeseCorn
- Garrett Mix (combination of CaramelCrisp and CheeseCorn)
- Buttery
- Matcha CaramelCrisp
- Almond CaramelCrisp
- Cashew CaramelCrisp
- Macadamia CaramelCrisp
- Pecan CaramelCrisp
- Spicy Kettlecorn

Seasonal

- Hot Cocoa CaramelCrisp
- 100% Chocolate CaramelCrisp
- Frango Chocolate Mint CaramelCrisp

== See also ==
- Culture of Chicago
