= Nils Blommér =

Swedish painter (1816–1853)

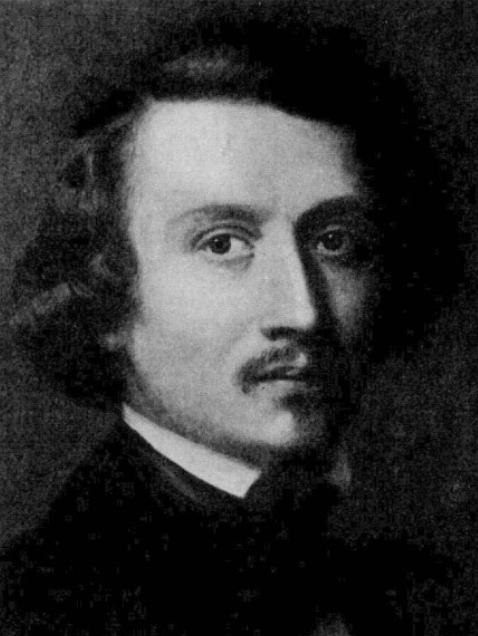
- Blommér in 1848, by Per Södermark
- Born: Nils Johan Olsson; 12 June 1816; Blommeröd, Sweden
- Died: 1 February 1853 (aged 36); Rome, Italy
- Other name: Nils Jakob Olsson
- Education: Royal Swedish Academy of Fine Arts
- Occupations: Painter, educator
- Spouse: Edla Gustafva Jansson (m. 1852–1853; death)

Nils Blommér, born Nils Johan Olsson (12 June 1816 – 1 February 1853) was a Swedish painter and educator. His middle name is sometimes given as Jakob.

== Biography ==
He was born to the schoolteacher, Anders Olsson, and his wife, Elsa née Jakobsdotter, in Blommeröd, a village in the Diocese of Lund.

He started his career as an apprentice to Magnus Körner in Lund then, in 1839, enrolled at the Royal Swedish Academy of Fine Arts. In 1847, he received a generous scholarship that enabled him to go to Paris, where he studied with Léon Cogniet. It was there he adopted the name "Blommér", after his birthplace. Later, he came under the influence of the neo-romantics, such as Erik Gustaf Geijer, Per Daniel Amadeus Atterbom and Erik Johan Stagnelius. He also drew inspiration from Swedish folk songs and the folklore motifs of the Austrian painter, Moritz von Schwind. He firmly believed that nature had an inherent soul; symbolized by folk characters.

Around 1850, he moved to Italy where, in November 1852, he married Edla Gustafva Jansson, also a painter. A few weeks later, he caught pneumonia and died in Rome, from related complications, early the following year.

Blommér's best known works are based on Norse mythology and folklore. They include Älfdrömmen, Sommarnattsdrömmen, Näcken och Ägirs döttrar, Brage och Iduna, Freja, Loke och Sigyn and Älfvor. They may be seen at the Göteborgs konstmuseum, Livrustkammaren and the Nationalmuseum.

== Gallery ==
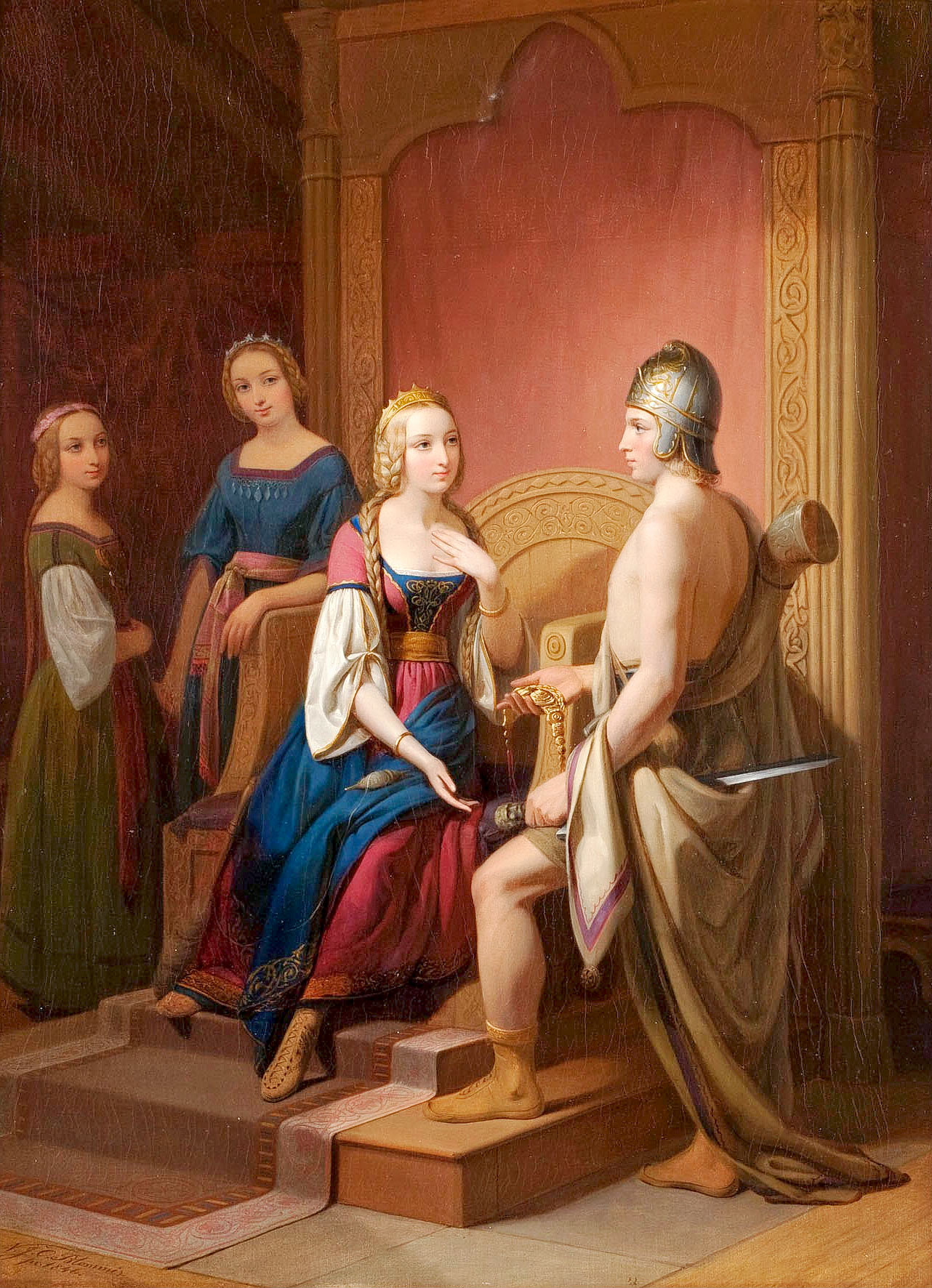
Heimdal öfverlemnar till Freja smycket Bryfing (Heimdallr returns the necklace Bryfing to Freyja), 1845

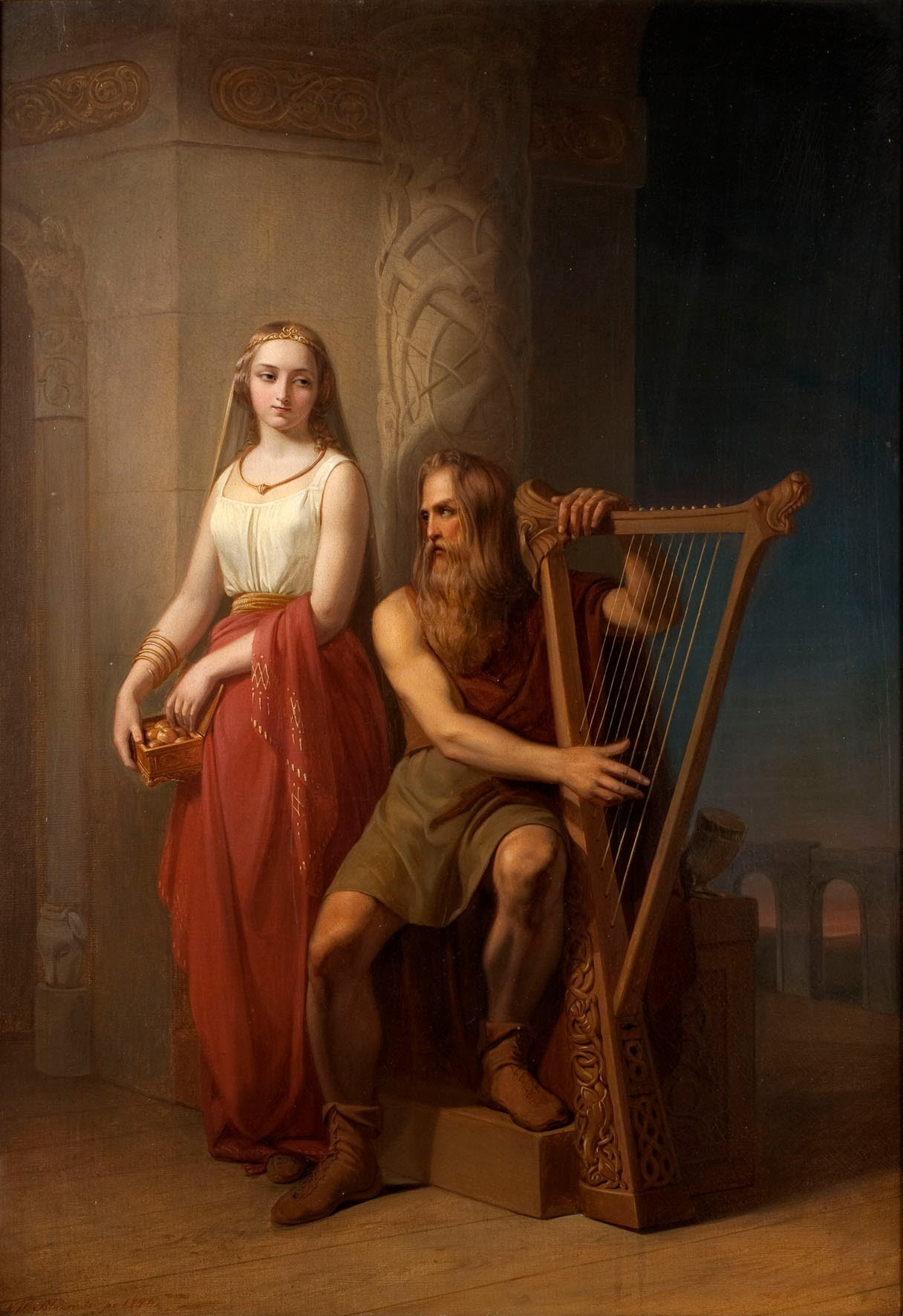
Brage och Iduna, (Bragi and Iðunn), 1846

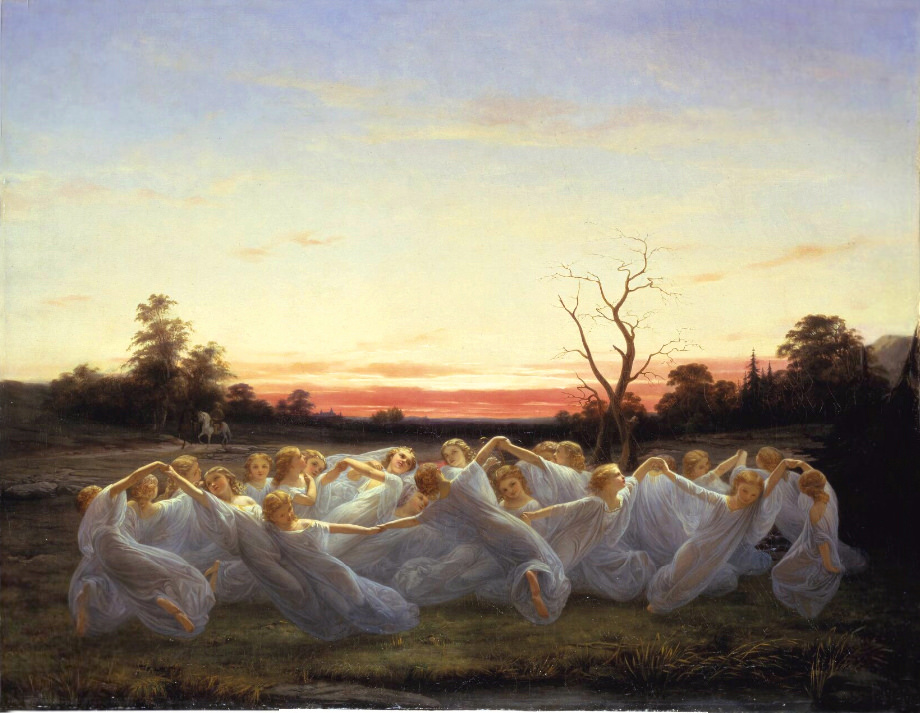
Ängsälvor (meadow elves), 1850

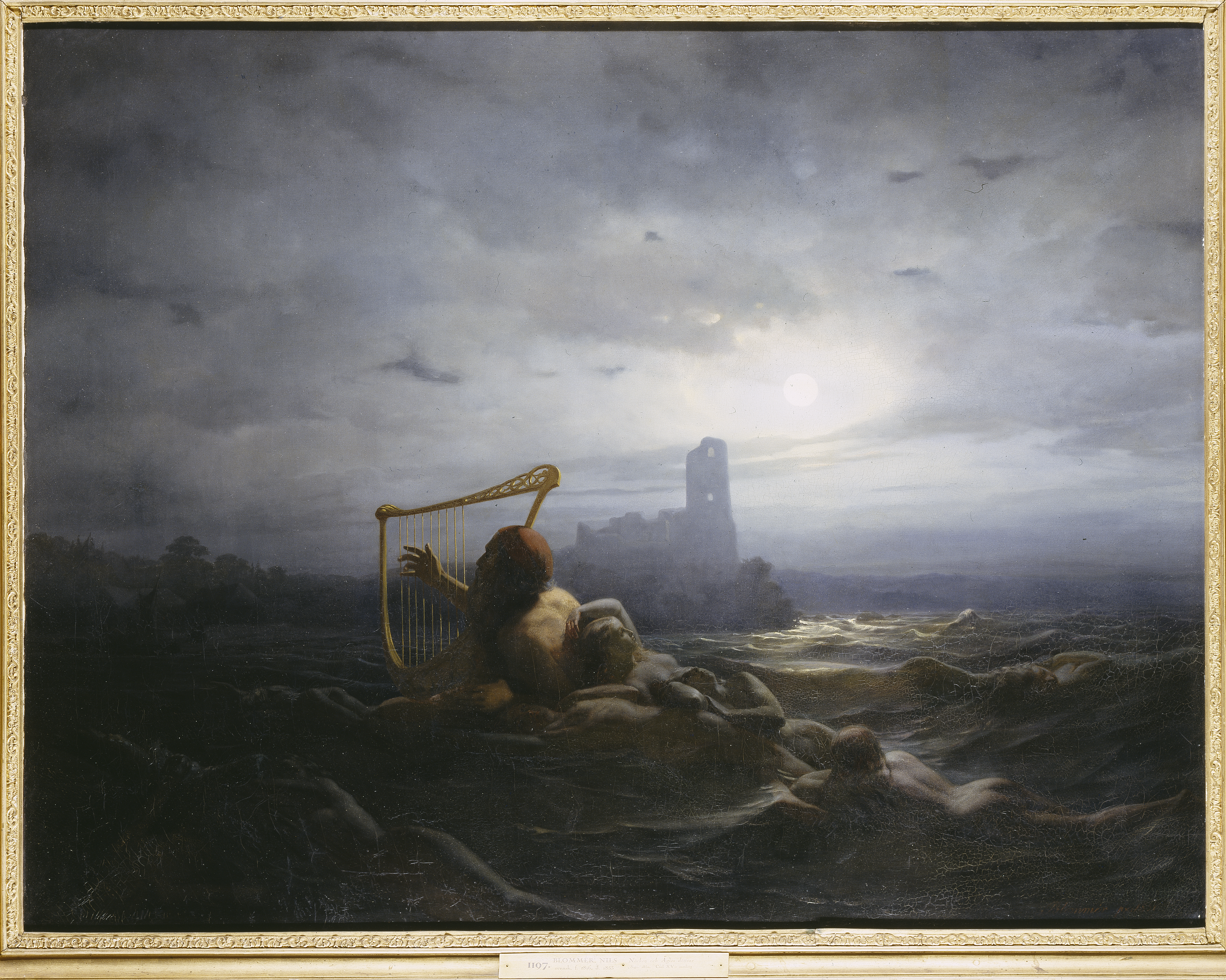
Näcken och Ägirs döttrar (Necks and Ægir's Daughters), 1850

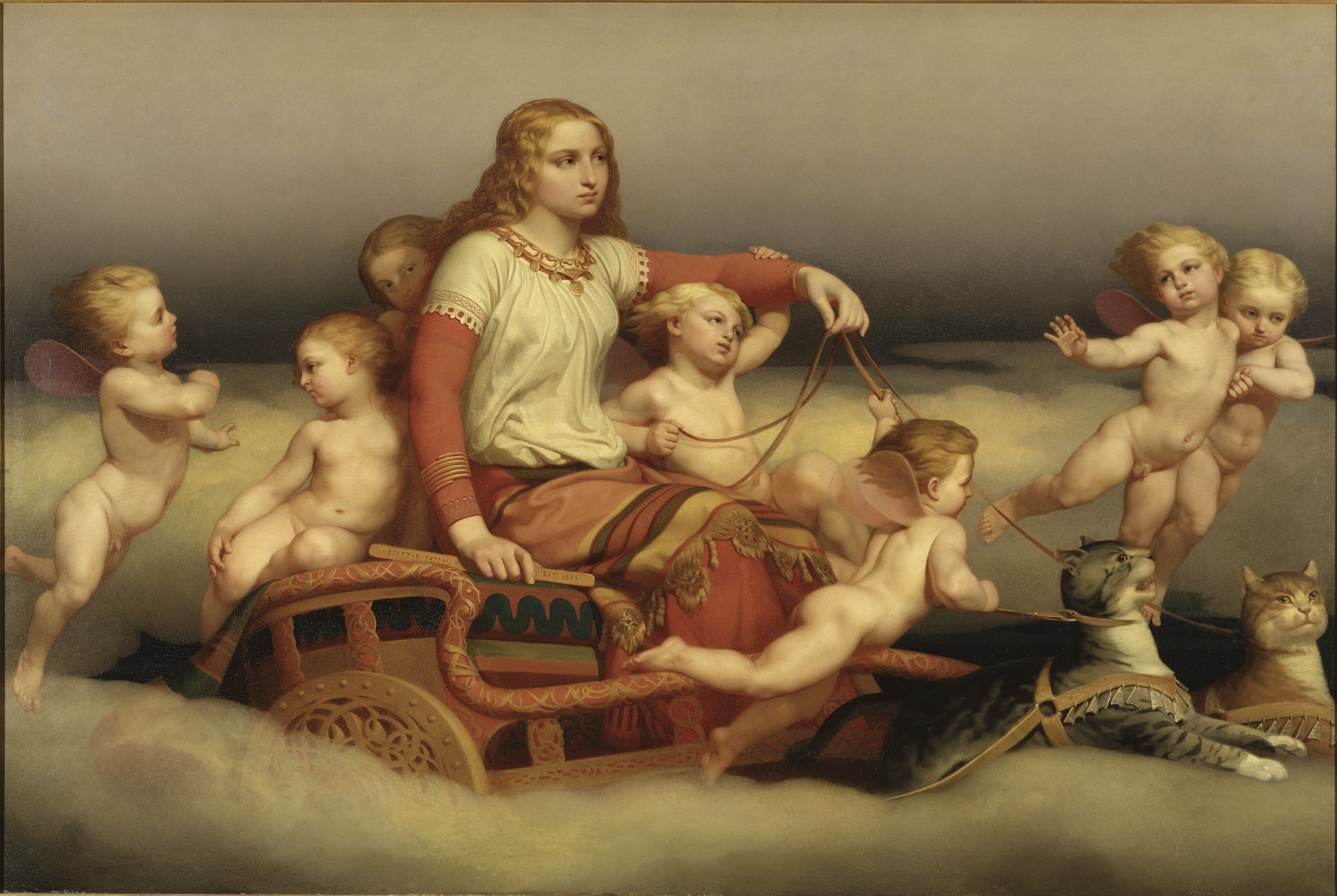
Freja sökande sin make (Freyja Seeking her Husband), 1852

== Sources ==
- This article is based on the public domain Svenskt biografiskt handlexikon
- Gunnar Olof Hyltén-Cavallius, Historie-målaren Nils Johan Olsson Blommér, 1854
- Annika Nordin, "På spaning efter Näcken eller en spelmans jordefärd", In: Paletten, Vol.4, 1990 pp. 15–19 ISSN 0031-0352
- Patrik Reuterswärd, "Två fullödiga verk av Nils Jakob Blommér: "Ängsälvor" och ett makalöst porträtt", In: Konsthistorisk tidskrift, 1996, Scandinavian University Press ISSN 0023-3609
- August Sohlman, "N. J. O. Blommér", In: Svea folkkalender, 1854 (Online)
- Gustave Thomæus, Nils Jakob Blommér, Skånska Central, 1922 (WorldCat)
