= Nordstrom Downtown Portland =

Building in Portland, Oregon, U.S.

Nordstrom
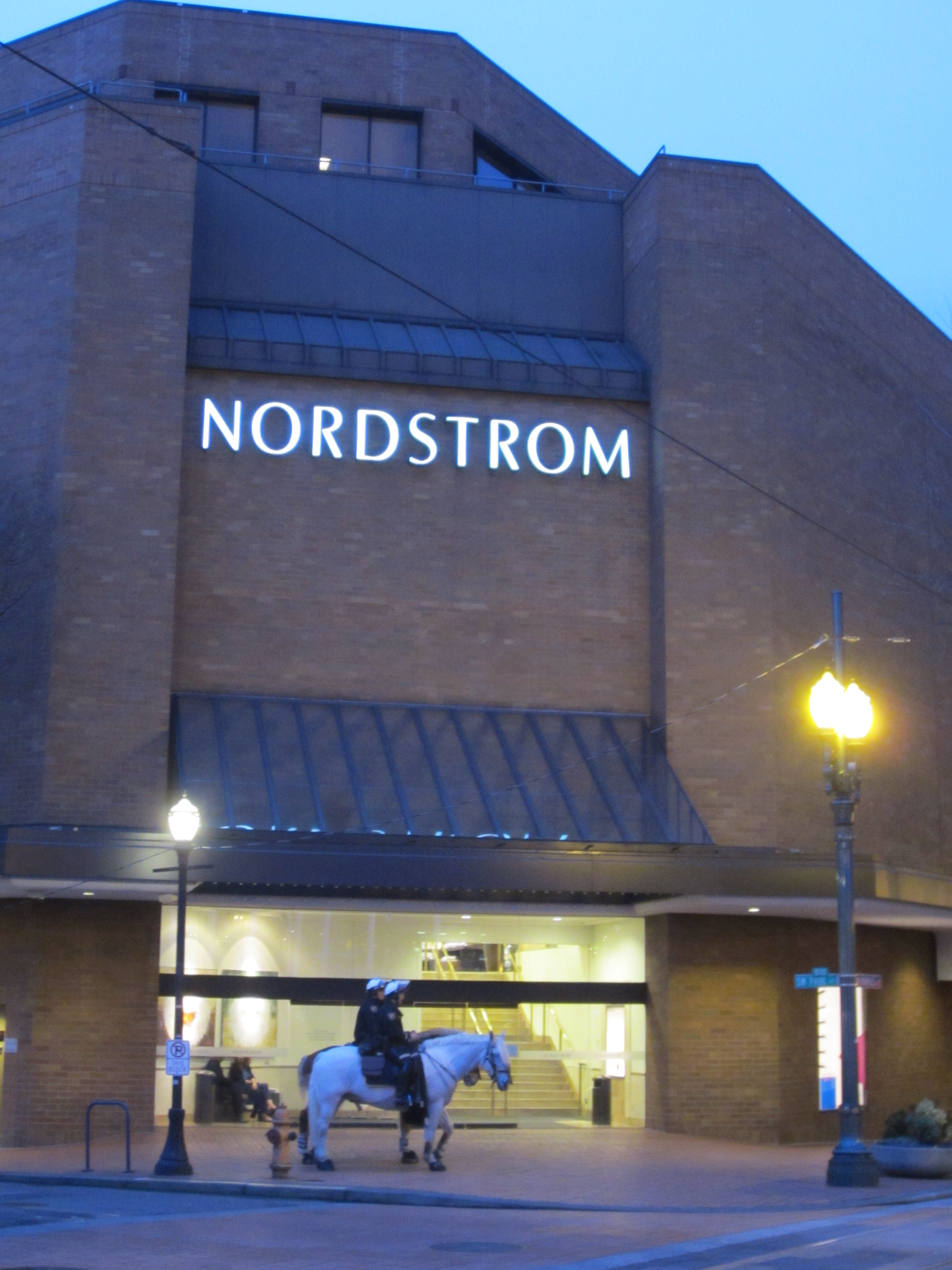
- Portland Police in front of Nordstrom, 2012
- Interactive map of the Nordstrom area

General information
- Location: 701 Southwest Broadway, Portland, Oregon, United States
- Coordinates: 45°31′9.0″N 122°40′49.2″W
- Current tenants: Nordstrom
- Completed: 1977

The Nordstrom building in downtown Portland, Oregon, occupies a city block next to Pioneer Courthouse Square and houses a Nordstrom store.

== Description and history ==
The building was completed in 1977. According to The Oregonian, the building's construction "helped kickstart a much-needed retail revitalization". In 2001, Parr Financial purchased the building from Portland CT Investment Inc. for $13.1 million plus $200,000 in other costs.

Garth Edwards' 1990 brushed stainless steel sculpture Urban Arrangements is attached to the east and west sides of the building. The artwork depicts abstract trees and branches, measures approximately 10 ft. x 15 ft. x 1/2 in., and was surveyed by the Smithsonian Institution's "Save Outdoor Sculpture!" program in 1993.

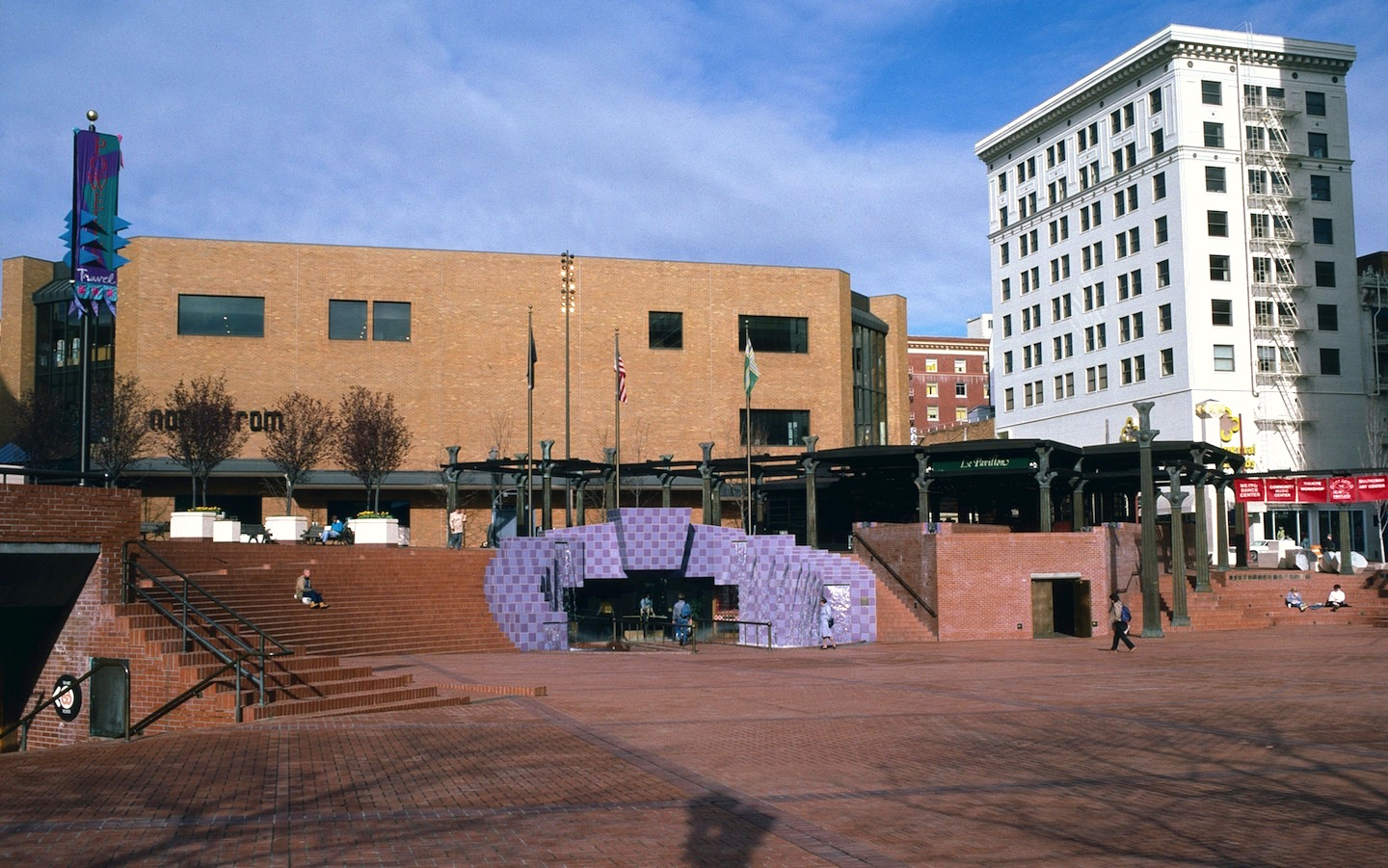
The building from Pioneer Courthouse Square, 1986

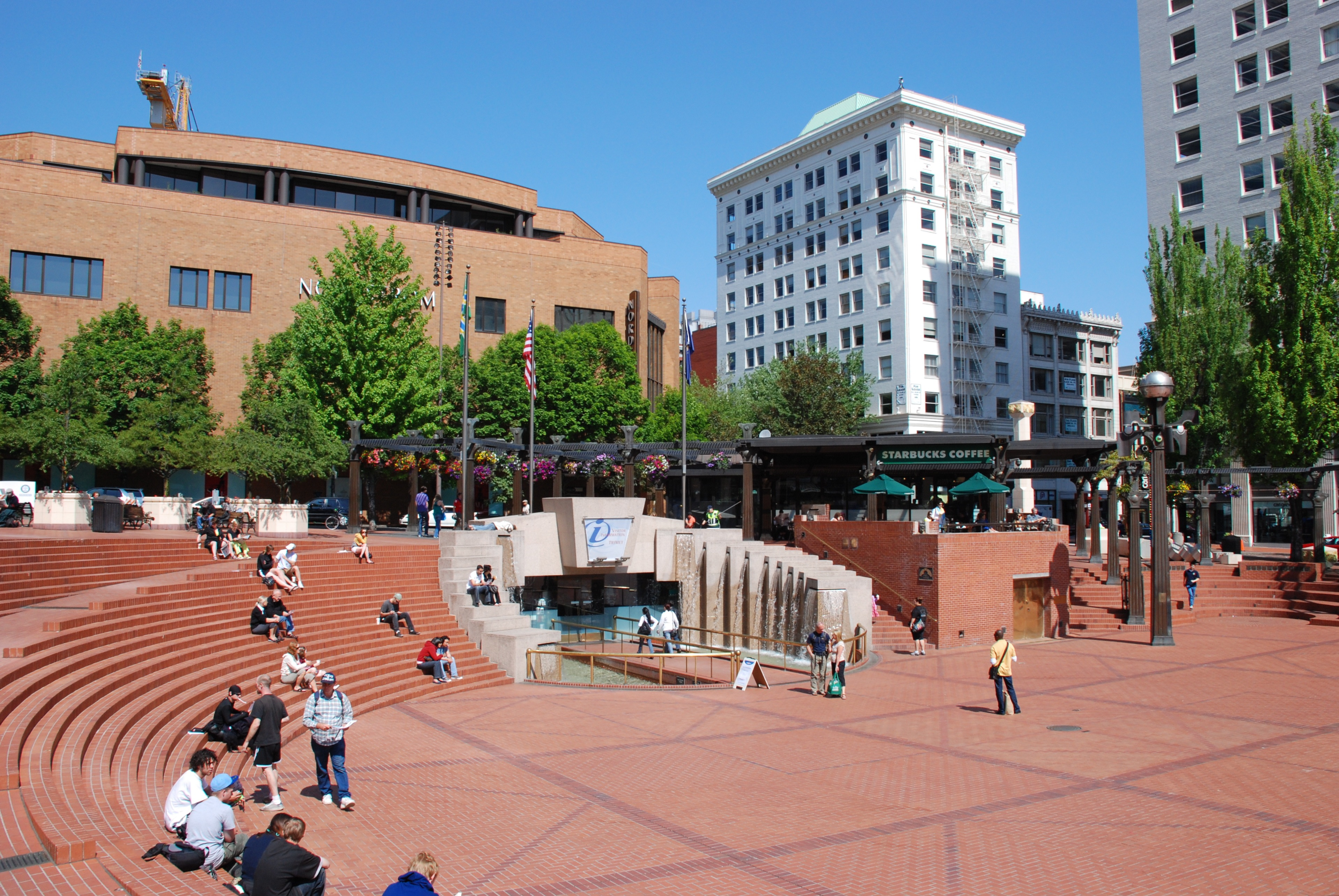
The building from Pioneer Courthouse Square, 2009

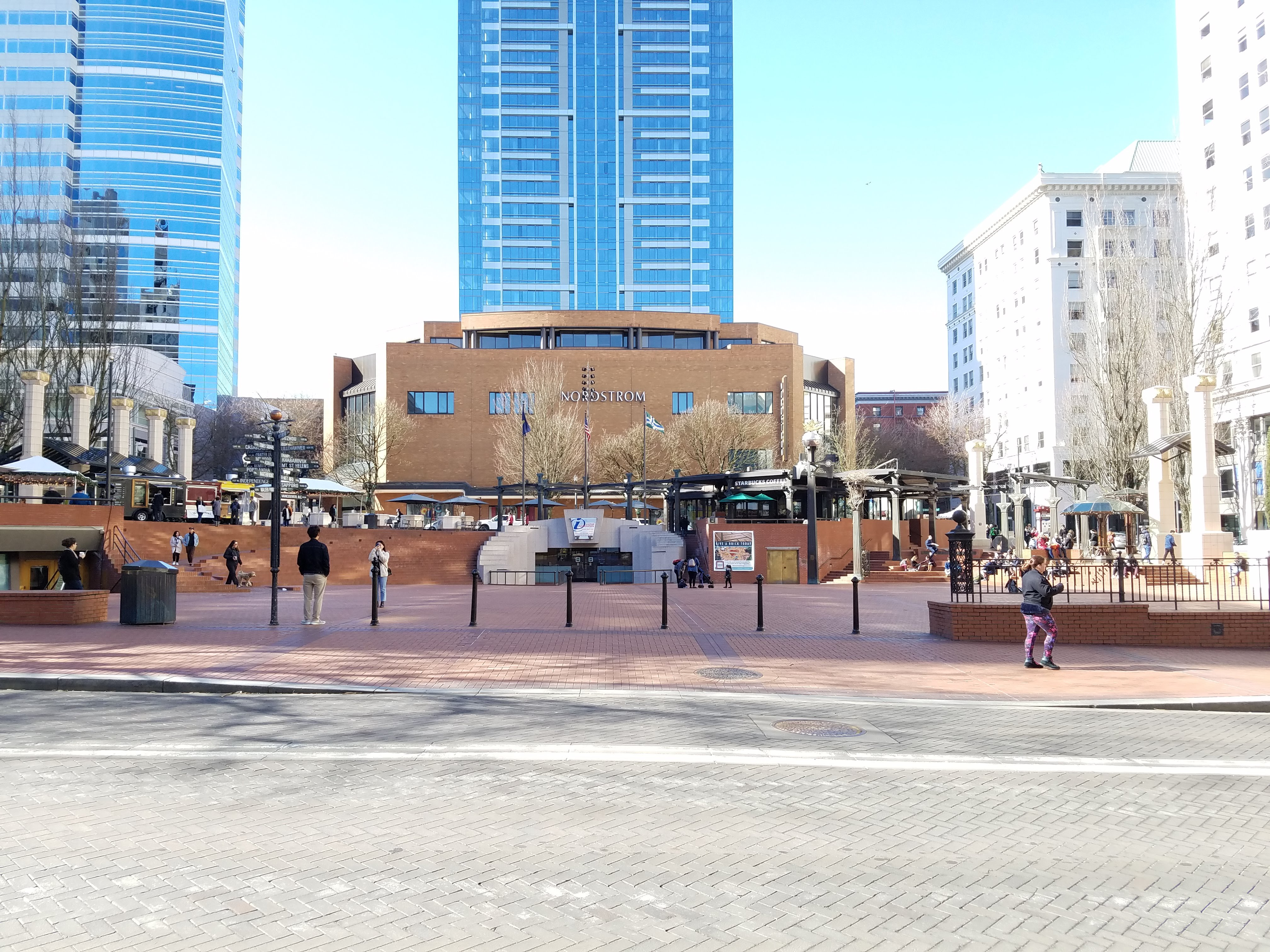
The building behind Pioneer Courthouse Square in 2019
