= Edla Blommér =

Finnish painter (1817–1908)

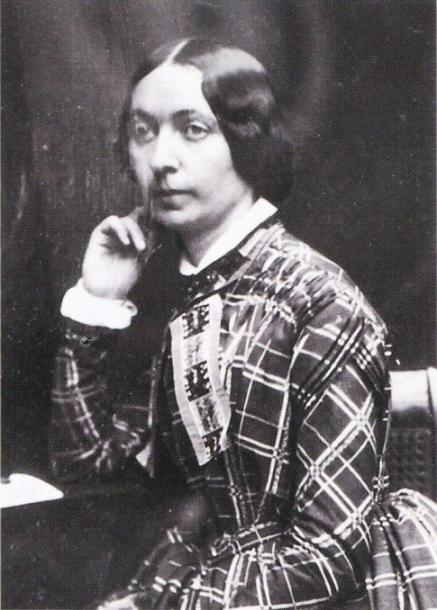
- Born: Edla Gustafva Jansson; 10 May 1817; Helsinki, Finland
- Died: 19 December 1908 (aged 91); Helsinki, Finland
- Other names: Edla Jansson-Blommer, Edla Blommer Jansson, Edla Gustava Jansson
- Education: Royal Swedish Academy of Fine Arts
- Spouse: Nils Blommér (m. 1852–1853; his death)

Edla Gustafva Jansson (1817 – 1908) was a Finnish painter, who worked in the Biedermeier style. She was briefly married to Swedish painter Nils Blommér, and is also known as Edla Blommer Jansson and Edla Jansson-Blommér.

Blommér studied under Johan Erik Lindh, and her future spouse Nils Blommér. She attended classes at the Royal Swedish Academy of Fine Arts in Stockholm, Sweden.

One of her best known works is a portrait of Sara Wacklin (1846, Ateneum). Her paintings can be found in museum collections, including at the Finnish National Gallery, Malmö Art Museum, and Nationalmuseum in Stockholm.
