= Frederick & Nelson Building =

Building in Seattle, Washington, U.S.

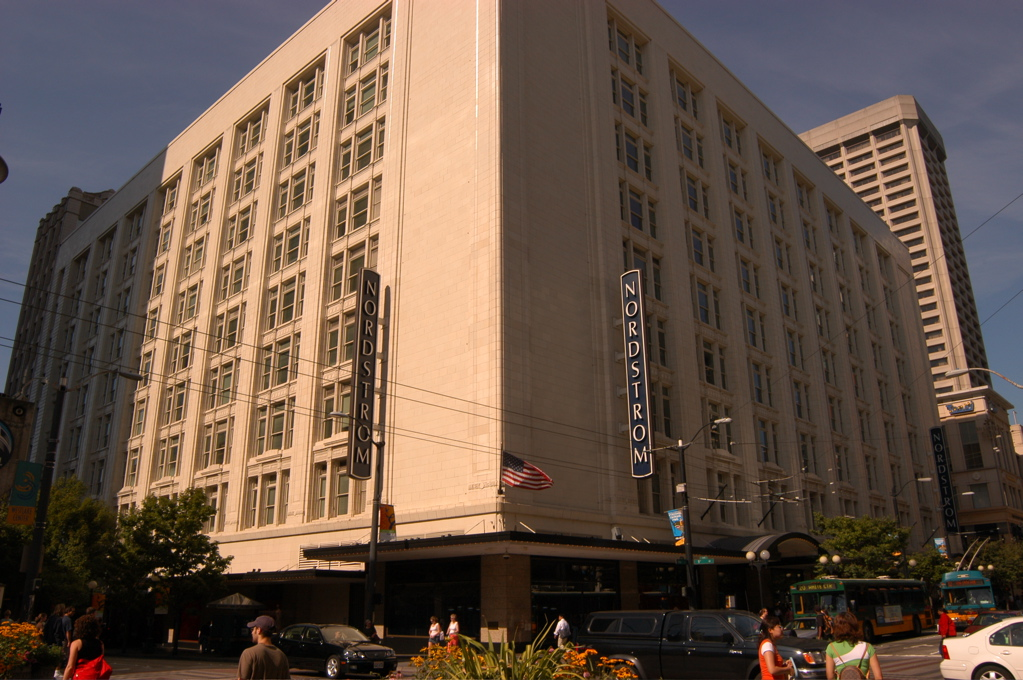
- Exterior of the Frederick & Nelson Building (2004)
- Interactive map of the Frederick & Nelson Building area
- Alternative names: Frederick & Nelson Department Store; Nordstrom flagship store

General information
- Status: Open
- Type: Department store
- Architectural style: Neo-Renaissance
- Location: 500 Pine Street, Seattle, Washington, United States
- Coordinates: 47.6122937°N 122.3362876°W
- Current tenants: Nordstrom
- Named for: Donald E. Frederick; Nels B. Nelson
- Year built: 1916–1918
- Opened: September 3, 1918; 107 years ago (Frederick & Nelson); September 21, 1998; 27 years ago (Nordstrom)
- Closed: May 31, 1992; 33 years ago (Frederick & Nelson)
- Client: Donald E. Frederick
- Owner: Nordstrom

Height
- Height: 134 feet (41 m)

Technical details
- Floor count: 12 (Note: Floor count includes 10 above-ground floors of selling space and two basement levels.)
- Floor area: 383,000 square feet (35,600 m^{2}) of selling space.

Design and construction
- Architects: John Graham, Sr.
- Architecture firm: John Graham & Company

Other information
- Public transit access: Link: 50 Westlake

Website
- Nordstrom store information

Seattle Landmark
- Designated: October 16, 1996

The Frederick & Nelson Building is a department store building and landmark on Pine Street in Seattle, Washington, United States. It was designed by the John Graham & Company architecture firm for Donald E. Frederick, and opened in 1918. It was the flagship store of the Frederick & Nelson department store chain until its bankruptcy and liquidation in 1992. It has been the flagship store of the Nordstrom department store chain since 1998; replacing its first store on Fifth Avenue, which opened in 1901.

== History ==
Donald E. Frederick, the remaining business partner of the Frederick & Nelson business, made expansion plans for a new building in downtown Seattle in 1914. The original plans called for the building to be six stories tall with a seventh floor in the basement, however, the foundation was built with the strength to hold ten stories. Even though businessmen and financiers branded the project "Frederick's Folly", his dream was finally realized three decades later. Despite a shortage of building materials that were needed elsewhere to fight World War I, the building opened on September 4, 1918, and hosted over 25,000 customers on opening day.

== Architecture ==
The building was designed by John Graham & Company in the Neo-Renaissance style.

== Gallery ==
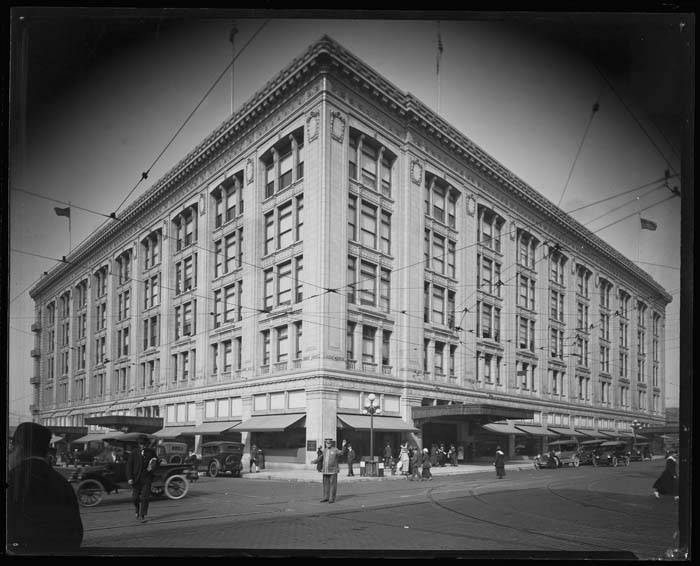
Original exterior before renovation (1918)
