= Blommer Chocolate Company =

American confection processing company

Coordinates: 41°53′22″N 87°38′38″W

- Company type: Private
- Industry: Chocolate
- Founded: 1939; 87 years ago
- Founders: Henry Blommer, Al Blommer, Bernard Blommer
- Headquarters: East Greenville, Pennsylvania, USA
- Area served: North America
- Key people: Henry Blommer, Al Blommer, Bernard Blommer, Peter Blommer
- Products: Chocolate, Cocoa powder, Cocoa butter, Chocolate liquor, chocolate-panned products, confectioner coating, other chocolate ingredients
- Revenue: ▲$907 Million (2019)
- Number of employees: 900 (2019)
- Parent: Fuji Oil Holdings Inc.
- Website: blommer.com

Blommer Chocolate Company is an integrated chocolate manufacturer based in Chicago, Illinois, considered to be the largest chocolate ingredient supplier in North America. Prior to its acquisition by Fuji Oil Holdings, Inc. in 2018, the company was the largest and oldest independent cocoa bean processor in North America.

== History ==
Blommer Chocolate was founded in 1939 by the brothers, Henry, Al, and Bernard in Chicago. The family has roots in the confectionary, farming and ice cream business.

In 1948, the company acquired Bishop chocolate in Los Angeles and Boldeman Chocolate in San Francisco in 1951. In 1970, Blommer opened their second production plant in Union City, California, followed by a plant in East Greenville, Pennsylvania in 1980. In 2001 the company broke ground for a new warehouse in Pennsylvania.

In 2003, Blommer employed around 450 people and crossed $500 million in revenue. In 2006, the company acquired a production plant from World's Finest Chocolate in Ontario, Canada.

In 2018, the company was sold to Fuji Oil Holdings Inc. for $750 million. After the transaction, the Blommer family and senior management continued to lead the company.

In 2022, the company announced that Peter Blommer, the grandson of Henry Blommer, who had started working with Blommer Chocolate aged 17 in 1991, would step down as CEO of the company. He continued to serve in the role of Vice Chairman, while Nao Rokukawa, the Chairman of Blommer, took over as interim CEO until the position was filled.

In 2024, the company closed its original Chicago plant and moved operations to other facilities.

== Corporate affairs ==
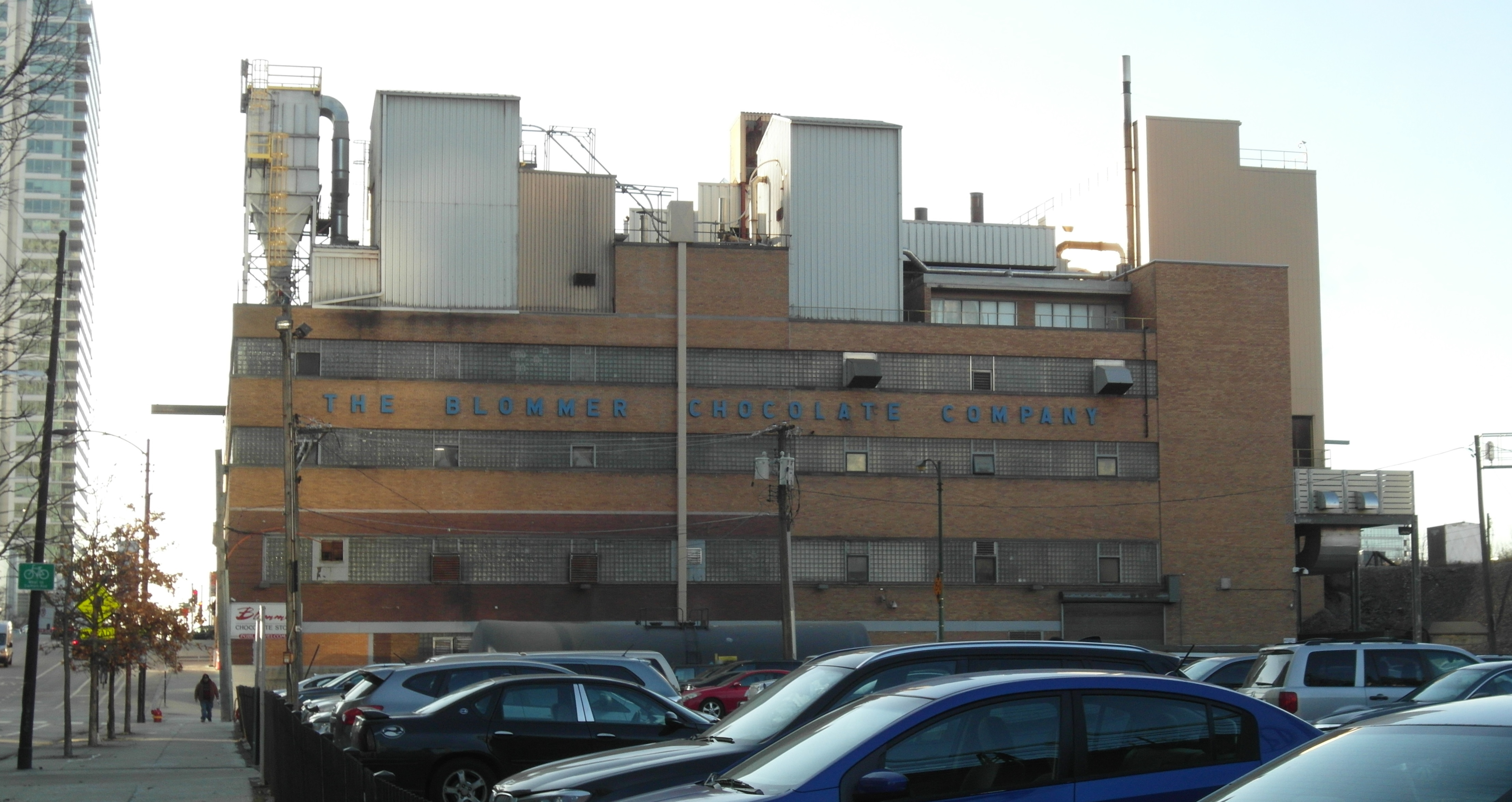
Original Blommer Chocolate Company factory

=== Factories and store ===
The company operates three plants in North America:

- Campbellford, Ontario
- East Greenville, Pennsylvania
- Union City, California

The company also operates an external R&D facility in Chicago and another production plant in China.

=== Aroma ===
The former factory in the West Loop area of Chicago was known for sending a chocolate aroma into the air. Though the smell was popular among many Chicagoans, in 2006, a nearby condo owner complained to the EPA about the smell, complaining that it violated the Clean Air Act. Blommer was not fined, having explained that it was upgrading its filtration system.

== Products ==
More than 45% of cocoa beans processed in the United States are processed (into cocoa butter, cocoa powder and chocolate liquor) by Blommer; about 70% of their business is supplying chocolate to various branded companies for use in those companies' own products.

Blommer's Chocolates Company does not sell directly through retail. Another branch of the family owned and operated a retail store located in the front corner of the Chicago manufacturing site until February, 2020, which sold various chocolates and chocolate baking supplies purchased from Blommer and other vendors.

== Literature ==
- Kimmerle, Beth (2010). Blommer: An American Chocolate Legacy. Blommer Chocolate. OCLC 658053866.
