= Deaths in May 1987 =

The following is a list of notable deaths in May 1987.

Entries for each day are listed alphabetically by surname. A typical entry lists information in the following sequence:

- Name, age, country of citizenship at birth, subsequent country of citizenship (if applicable), reason for notability, cause of death (if known), and reference.

== May 1987 ==
=== 1 ===
- Stanley Copp, 72, Canadian politician, member of the Legislative Assembly of Manitoba (1953–1958).
- Paul Geidel, 93, American murderer, second longest serving U.S. prison inmate.
- Bobo Holloman, 64, American Major League baseball player (St. Louis Browns), heart attack.
- Antonio Borja Won Pat, 78, Guam politician, Guam's Delegate to the U.S. House of Representatives (1973–1985), heart attack.
- Dick Surhoff, 57, American NBA basketballer (New York Knicks).
- James W. Sutherland, 69, American U.S. Army general.
- Fujio Yoshida, 99, Japanese artist.

=== 2 ===
- George Allen, 43, American football player (Houston Oilers).
- Reidar Carlsen, 78, Norwegian politician.
- Karl Davis, 25, American fashion designer, pneumonia.
- Eugene Gilhawley, 77, Irish politician, member of the Dáil Éireann (1961–1969, 1973–1981).
- Michael Gover, 73, English actor (Survivors).
- John E. Kerrigan, 78, American politician, acting Mayor of Boston, cardiac arrest.
- Harold K. Schneider, 61–62, American economic anthropologist, complications from surgery.

=== 3 ===
- Joyce Coad, 70, American child actress.
- Roberto Concepcion, 83, Filipino lawyer, Chief Justice of the Philippines.
- Dalida, 54, Egyptian-born French singer and actress (Bambino, Gondolier), suicide.
- Dickie Fuller, 74, West Indian cricketer.
- Viola Grosvenor, 74, British aristocrat, Duchess of Westminster, car accident.
- Dick Kelsey, 82, American animation art director, theme park designer and illustrator of children's books.

=== 4 ===
- Paul Butterfield, 44, American blues harmonica player, singer and bandleader, overdose.
- Cathryn Damon, 56, American actress (Soap), ovarian cancer.
- Paul Groesse, 81, Hungarian-born American Academy Award–winning art director, pneumonia.
- Konstanty Jeleński, 65, Polish essayist.
- Khalilullah Khalili, 79, Afghan poet, historian and diplomat.
- Tomohiro Kojiri, 29, Japanese journalist for newspaper Asahi Shimbun, murdered.
- Wilbur Little, 59, American jazz bassist.
- Michael Minor, 46, American illustrator, art director on Star Trek movies.
- John Denys Taylor, 78, English missionary

=== 5 ===
- Sir Hugh Fraser, 50, British chairman of the House of Fraser, Harrods, and Whyte & Mackay, cancer.
- Herbert Hasler, 73, British officer in the Royal Marines and yachtsman.
- Allen Jones, 46, American record producer and songwriter ("Hard to Handle"), heart attack.
- Frank McAllister, 69, American baseball player.
- Vera Schäferkordt, 62, German Olympic swimmer (1952).
- Joe Shack, 71, Canadian NHL player (New York Rangers).
- Alexander Shmidt, 75, Soviet painter
- Jim Taylor, 80, Australian rules footballer.
- Robert Stanford Tuck, 70, British fighter pilot and flying ace in the Royal Air Force.
- Phil Woolpert, 71, American college basketball coach, lung cancer.
- Roy Young, 69, American NFL player (Washington Redskins).

=== 6 ===
- William J. Casey, 74, American CIA director, brain tumour.
- Lucien Choury, 89, French Olympic cyclist (1924).
- Zalman Friedmann, 74–75, Israeli footballer.
- Muhammadullah Hafezzi, 91–92, Bangladeshi politician and Islamic leader.
- Denis Jones, 80, Irish politician, member of the Dáil Éireann (1957–1977).
- Stanislav Lusk, 55, Czech Olympic rower (1952, 1956, 1960).
- Karel Plicka, 92, Czechoslovak photographer, film director and cinematographer.
- David Weitzman, 88, British politician.

=== 7 ===
- Roy S. Armstrong, 86, American politician, member of the South Dakota House of Representatives (1953–1964).
- Boom-Boom Beck, 82, American Major League baseball player (Philadelphia Phillies).
- Colin Blakely, 56, Northern Irish actor (Murder on the Orient Express, A Man for All Seasons), leukaemia.
- Félix Erauzquin, 79, Spanish Olympic athlete (1948).
- Gil Lefebvre, 77, American NFL player.
- Stewart McKinney, 56, American politician, member of U.S. House of Representatives (1971–1987), pneumonia (AIDS).
- Paul Popham, 45, American gay rights activist, AIDS.
- Dudley Ryder, 94, British hereditary peer, member of the House of Lords.
- Karl Schuke, 80, German organ builder.

=== 8 ===
- Marjorie Barnard, 89, Australian novelist and historian.
- Sidney Cohen, 76, American psychiatrist, professor of medicine and author, heart failure.
- Alberta Gay, 74, American mother of Marvin and Frankie Gaye, bone cancer.
- Sir James Plimsoll, 70, Australian diplomat, Governor of Tasmania, ambassador to the US, heart attack.
- Hugh Saunders, 92, South African RAF officer.
- Doris Stokes, 67, British "spiritualist", "medium" and author, brain cancer.
- Carl Tchilinghiryan, 77, German businessman, co-founder of coffee house Tchibo.
- Members of the Provisional Irish Republican Army (IRA) killed during the Loughgall ambush:
  - Declan Arthurs, 21, Northern Irish IRA member, shot.
  - Patrick Joseph Kelly, 30, Northern Irish IRA commander, shot.
  - Jim Lynagh, 31, Northern Irish IRA member, shot.
  - Pádraig McKearney, 32, Northern Irish IRA member, shot.

=== 9 ===
- Obafemi Awolowo, 78, Nigerian nationalist and statesman, Premier of Western Nigeria.
- Franz Bednar, 77, Austrian Olympic bobsledder (1936).
- Dave James, 58, American racing driver.
- Paulus Kessels, 86, Dutch Olympic sports shooter (1936).
- Jimmy Kruger, 69, South African lawyer and politician, President of the Senate.
- Noel Murless, 77, English racehorse trainer.
- John M. Schiff, 82, American investment banker, partner in Kuhn, Loeb & Co., national president of the Boy Scouts of America.
- Brian Shenton, 60, British Olympic sprinter (1952, 1956).

=== 10 ===
- Sadamichi Hirasawa, 95, Japanese tempera painter, convicted of mass poisoning, pneumonia.
- Nicolette Macnamara, 76, British artist and author.
- Wilhelm Strienz, 86, German bass operatic singer.

=== 11 ===
- James Jesus Angleton, 69, American intelligence operative and C.I.A chief, cancer.
- Alex Jeffery, 78, Canadian politician, member of the House of Commons of Canada (1949–1953).
- Walter McMillen, 73, Northern Irish footballer.

=== 12 ===
- Bob Farrar, 68, Australian rugby league footballer.
- Victor Feldman, 53, English jazz musician, heart attack.
- Chinn Ho, 83, Hawaiian entrepreneur and businessman, owner of Honolulu Star-Bulletin, heart failure.
- Pierre Litoux, 84, French politician, member of the National Assembly (France) (1962–1968).
- Giancarlo Marinelli, 71, Italian Olympic basketball player (1936, 1948).
- Ion Pistol, 40, Romanian convicted murderer, executed.
- Nora Rubashova, 78, Belarusian Catholic nun.
- Delos Thurber, 70, American Olympic high jumper (1936).
- Robert Trimbole, 56, Australian businessman, drug baron and organized crime figure, heart attack.

=== 13 ===
- Signe Amundsen, 87, Norwegian soprano.
- Norberto Bautista, 46, Argentine footballer.
- F. R. Crawley, 75, Canadian film producer, cinematographer and director.
- Richard Ellmann, 69, American literary critic and biographer of Irish writers, motor neurone disease.
- Manín, 71, Spanish footballer.
- Phil Moore, 69, American jazz pianist and bandleader, heart attack.
- Leo Norris, 78, American MLB player (Philadelphia Phillies).
- Ismael Rivera, 55, Puerto Rican composer and salsa singer, heart attack.
- Forbes Robinson, 60, British bass.
- Elly Winter, 88, German communist and political activist.

=== 14 ===
- Tsai Chen-chou, 40, Taiwanese politician and businessman, liver disease.
- Patrick Delap, 55, Irish politician, member of the Dáil Éireann (1970–1973).
- Rita Hayworth, 68, American actress and dancer (Gilda), complications from Alzheimer's disease.
- Jānis Lipke, 87, Latvian rescuer of Jews in World War II.
- Luke Sewell, 86, American Major league baseball player (Cleveland Indians).
- Elizabeth Zarubina, 87, Soviet spy, traffic accident.
- Vitomil Zupan, 73, Austro-Hungarian–born Slovene writer.

=== 15 ===
- Elisabeth Bonetsmüller, 80, German Olympic high jumper (1928).
- Wynne Gibson, 88, American actress, cerebral thrombosis.
- Raynor Johnson, 86, English-born Australian parapsychologist, physicist and author.
- Kalyanakit Kitiyakara, 57, Thai cardiothoracic surgeon.
- Máire MacNeill, 82, Irish journalist, folklorist and translator.
- Barry Mannakee, 39, British police officer with Royal Protection Squad, bodyguard to Diana, Princess of Wales, traffic accident.
- L. G. Pine, 79, British writer, lecturer and researcher.
- Lionel Van Praag, 78, Australian motorcycle speedway champion.

=== 16 ===
- Lionel Cooper, 65, Australian international rugby league footballer (Huddersfield, Australia).
- Sir John Esmonde, 16th Baronet, 58, Irish politician, member of the Dáil Éireann (1973–1977).
- Frank Mayborn, 83, American newspapers editor, publisher and broadcaster.
- Willie Powell, 83, American baseball player.
- Ronnie Shakes, 40, American stand-up comedian, heart attack.
- Michael Wood, 69, British medical doctor, cancer.

=== 17 ===
- Wilbur J. Cohen, 73, American social scientist and civil servant, U.S. Secretary of Health, Education and Welfare.
- Gunnar Myrdal, 88, Swedish economist, Nobel laureate in Economic Sciences.
- Dudley C. Sharp, 82, American Secretary of the Air Force, cancer.
- Okkie van Greunen, 53, South African Olympic modern pentathlete (1956, 1960).

=== 18 ===
- Mahdi Amel, 51, Lebanese Marxist philosopher and militant, assassinated.
- Heðin Brú, 86, Faroese novelist and translator.
- Hossein Fardoust, 70, Iranian military officer, deputy head of SAVAK, heart attack.
- Santo Mazzarino, 71, Italian historian.

=== 19 ===
- David Abbott, 85, American Olympic long-distance runner (1928).
- James Everett Chase, 73, American politician, Mayor of Spokane, cancer.
- Hamid Reza Chitgar, 38, Iranian communist politician, exiled to France, assassinated.
- Francis Cottam, 86, English cricketer.
- Deepak Dhawan, 32, Indian political activist, member of the Communist Party of India, murdered.
- Almerigo Grilz, 34, Italian politician and independent war correspondent, killed in war zone.
- Huntington D. Sheldon, 84, American C.I.A. director of Current Intelligence, murdered.
- Stanisław Szukalski, 93, Polish-American sculptor and painter.
- James Tiptree Jr., (Alice Bradley Sheldon), 71, American science fiction and fantasy author, suicide.

=== 20 ===
- William Creighton, 77, American Anglican bishop, heart attack.
- Fränz Ehringer, 58, Luxembourgian Olympic boxer (1948).
- Emőke Énekes-Szegedi, 39, Hungarian Olympic volleyball player (1972, 1980).
- Harvey Goldberg, 65, American historian and political activist, liver cancer.
- Herbert Jacobs, 84, American journalist for the Milwaukee Journal, professor of journalism, cancer.
- Ganpatrao Jadhav, 79, Indian freedom activist, journalist and writer.
- Edward Earl Johnson, 26, American convicted murderer, executed.
- Elmer Ray, 76, American heavyweight boxer.
- George Shibata, 60, American military officer, attorney and actor.
- Ma Sicong, 75, Chinese violinist and composer, died during heart operation.
- Colston Warne, 86, American professor of economics.

=== 21 ===
- Archie Carr, 77, American herpetologist and ecologist, professor of zoology, cancer.
- Finis Alonzo Crutchfield Jr., 70, American clergyman and bishop (United Methodist Church), AIDS.
- Ron Frederickson, 68, Australian rugby league footballer.
- Alejandro Rey, 57, Argentinian-American actor and television director, lung cancer.

=== 22 ===
- Paddy Belton, 60, Irish politician, Lord Mayor of Dublin.
- Milenko Bojanić, 62, Prime Minister of Serbia
- Thornton Freeland, 89, American film director.
- Frank Jenkins, 68, Australian rules footballer.
- Stewart Menaul, 71, British RAF officer.
- Heinrich Mückter, 72, German medical doctor and pharmacologist, developed thalidomide.
- Ernst Nagelschmitz, 85, German Olympic footballer (1928).
- Keidrych Rhys, 71, Welsh literary journalist, editor and poet, editor of periodical Wales.

=== 24 ===
- Alan Samuel Butler, 88, British aviator, chairman of De Havilland Aircraft Company.
- James J. Delaney, 86, American politician, chair of the House Rules Committee.
- Hermione Gingold, 89, English actress, heart problems complicated by pneumonia.
- Siegmund Klein, 85, German-born American bodybuilder and magazine publisher, cancer.
- Lajos Ligeti, 64, Hungarian orientalist and philologist.
- Thomas Burdett Money-Coutts, 85, English peer.
- Eugen Relgis, 92, Romanian writer and pacifist philosopher.

=== 25 ===
- Charley Brock, 71, American NFL footballer (Green Bay Packers).
- Winthrop G. Brown, 79, American lawyer and diplomat, U.S. Ambassador to Korea and Laos.
- Hugh Lester Campbell, 78, Canadian air marshal in the Royal Canadian Air Force and politician.
- Peter Coe, 58, English director and actor, car accident.
- Peter Gerald Charles Dickens, 70, English Royal Navy officer during World War II.
- Hermann Glöckner, 98, German painter and sculptor.
- William Kelly Harrison Jr., 91, American U.S. Army general.
- Don Sidle, 40, American ABA basketballer (Miami Floridians).
- Paweł Tuchlin, 41, Polish serial killer, hanged.

=== 26 ===
- Antoni Brzeżańczyk, 68, Polish footballer and manager.
- Rose Chan, 62, Chinese-born Malaysian cabaret dancer.
- Alvin Duke Chandler, 84, American Navy officer, president of the College of William & Mary.
- Rolando da Cruz, 56, Brazilian Olympic water polo player (1960).
- Paul Rimstead, 51–52, Canadian journalist (Toronto Sun), hemorrhage.
- Arthur M. Sackler, 73, American psychiatrist and marketer of pharmaceuticals, heart attack.
- Glenmore Webley, 35, Jamaican politician, shot.
- Robert Wilkins, 91, American country blues guitarist and vocalist.
- Ajita Wilson, 37, American transgender actress, brain hemorrhage.

=== 27 ===
- Alvin C. Eurich, 84, American educator, president of the State University of New York.
- Harry Fritz, 66, American collegiate athletics administrator and coach.
- Jack Heid, 62, American Olympic cyclist (1948).
- Colin McCahon, 67, New Zealand artist.
- John Howard Northrop, 95, American biochemist, Nobel laureate in Chemistry, suicide.
- Richard Bruce Nugent, 80, American writer and painter.
- Fatemeh Pahlavi, 58, Iranian royal, cancer.

=== 28 ===
- Billie Fulford, 72, New Zealand cricketer.
- Mikuláš Kucsera, 84, Czechoslovak Olympic athlete (1924).
- Léon Lambert, 58, Belgian banker and art collector, AIDS.
- Charles Ludlam, 44, American actor, director and playwright, pneumonia (AIDS).
- Arthur Matsu, 83, American NFL footballer (Dayton Triangles) and coach.
- Frits Ruimschotel, 65, Dutch Olympic water polo player (1948).
- James Saunders, 55, Canadian Olympic boxer (1952).
- Ronald Thomas, 71, Australian cricketer.

=== 29 ===
- Jean Delay, 79, French psychiatrist, neurologist and writer.
- Jozef Langenus, 88, Belgian Olympic middle-distance runner (1928).
- Vettam Mani, 65, Indian scholar and writer.
- Jack Sheehan, 94, American MLB player, (Brooklyn Robins).
- Charan Singh, 84, prime minister of India, cardiovascular collapse.
- Godfrey Surman, 72, English cricketer.
- Phyllis Tate, 76, English composer.

=== 30 ===
- Frank Carlson, 94, American politician, member of U.S. House of Representatives and Senate.
- George Davis-Goff, 81, New Zealand navy officer.
- Dewanohana Kuniichi, 78, Japanese sumo wrestler.
- Bill Gutteron, 87, American NFL player.
- Eliot Hodgkin, 81, English painter.
- Miyuki Ishikawa, 90, Japanese midwife, real estate agent and serial killer.
- Honorino Landa, 44, Chilean international footballer (Unión Española, Chile), cancer.
- Frank Licht, 71, American politician, Governor of Rhode Island, cancer.
- Hallam L. Movius, 79, American archaeologist.
- Turk Murphy, 71, American trombonist and bandleader, bone cancer.
- Norman Nicholson, 73, English poet.
- Cliff Simpson, 64, Canadian NHL player (Detroit Red Wings).
- Hilde Weissner, 77, German actress.

=== 31 ===
- John Abraham, 49, Indian filmmaker, short story writer and screenwriter, complications from a fall.
- Jerry Adair, 50, American Major League baseball player (Baltimore Orioles), liver cancer.
- Hubert Raymond Allen, 68, British Royal Air Force officer.
- Hilton Curran, 72, Australian rugby league footballer.
- Charles Drew, 70, British cardiothoracic surgeon, throat cancer.
- Wilbur Evans, 81, American actor and singer.
- Elisabeth Friske, 47, West German airline pilot, first female commercial pilot in West Germany, plane crash.
- Len Hamilton, 87, Australian politician, member of the Australian House of Representatives (1946–1961).
- Gertrude Jones Hawk, 83–84, American candy maker and entrepreneur (Gertrude Hawk Chocolates).
- Kolbein Lauring, 72, Norwegian resistance member during World War II.
- Dorothy Patrick, 65, Canadian-born American film actress (Till the Clouds Roll By), heart attack.
- Domenico Piemontesi, 84, Italian road bicycle racer.
- Roy Winsor, 75, American soap opera writer, producer and mystery novelist (Search for Tomorrow, Love of Life), heart attack.

=== Unknown date ===
- Sunny Harnett, 63, American model and actress, injuries sustained in a fire.
- Dev Raj Singh Thakur, Indian Air Force warrant officer, killed the killer of Mahatma Gandhi.
