= Michel Rabreau =

French politician (1937–2021)

Deputy from Loire-Atlantique's 7th constituency
- In office 13 August 1968 – 2 April 1978

Mayor of Guérande
- In office 1986–1993

Personal details
- Born: 6 September 1937 La Baule-Escoublac, France
- Died: 15 March 2021 (aged 83)

Michel Rabreau (6 September 1937 – 15 March 2021) was a French politician.

== Biography ==
Rabreau was a pharmacist and biologist by profession. After his studies, he took over his father's pharmacy in Guérande and also managed an analytical laboratory.

Rabreau's father, a former member of the French Resistance, inspired him to become a Gaullist activist. He became the deputy to Pierre Litoux, a member of the National Assembly from 1962 to 1968. In 1967, Litoux was defeated by Olivier Guichard. Guichard declined to stand in 1968 to serve a ministerial position and was replaced by Rabreau. A left-wing Gaullist, he supported Jacques Chaban-Delmas in the 1974 French presidential election. He also served as Mayor of Guérande from 1986 to 1993.

Michel Rabreau died on 15 March 2021 at the age of 83.
