= Paninternational Flight 112 =

1971 aviation accident in West Germany

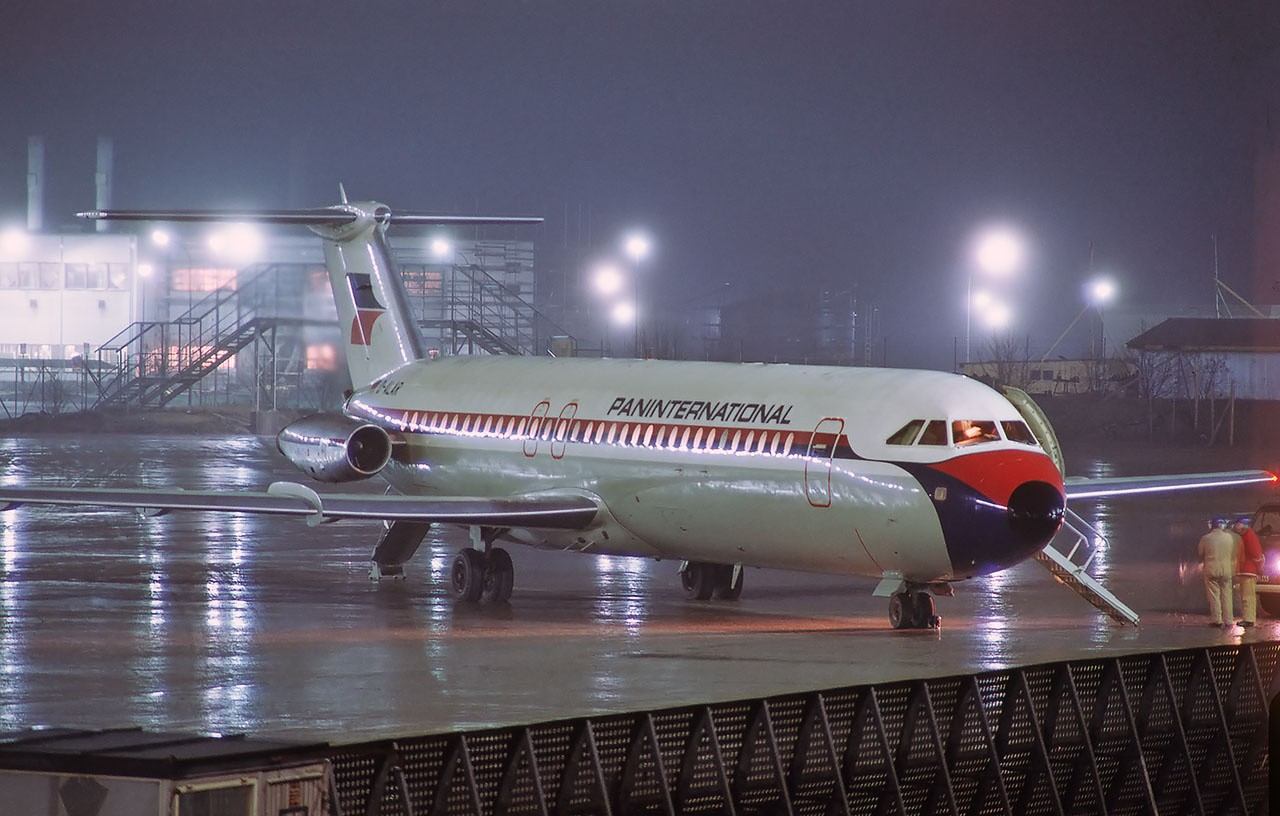
- D-ALAR, the aircraft involved in the accident, pictured in 1970

Accident
- Date: 6 September 1971
- Summary: Dual engine failure following engine overheating
- Site: Bundesautobahn 7 near Hamburg, West Germany; 53°42′10″N 09°56′33″E

Aircraft
- Aircraft type: BAC One-Eleven
- Operator: Paninternational
- Registration: D-ALAR
- Flight origin: Hamburg Airport, Hamburg, West Germany
- Destination: Málaga Airport, Málaga, Spain
- Occupants: 121
- Passengers: 115
- Crew: 6
- Fatalities: 22
- Injuries: 99
- Survivors: 99

Paninternational Flight 112 was a BAC One-Eleven operated by German airline Paninternational that crashed in Hamburg on 6 September 1971 while attempting to land on an autobahn following the failure of both engines. The accident killed 22 passengers and crew out of 121 on board.

== Aircraft ==
The aircraft involved was a BAC One-Eleven registered as D-ALAR and first flew one year before the accident.

== Accident ==
Paninternational Flight 112 took off from Hamburg Airport in Hamburg, West Germany, on a flight to Málaga Airport in Málaga, Spain, with 115 passengers and six crew on board. The captain was Reinhold Hüls, a former military pilot with more than 3,000 hours flying time; co-pilot Elisabeth Friske was the first woman jet pilot in West Germany, at the time with only 7 hours in the BAC One-Eleven. After the takeoff, as the aircraft climbed through 300 metres (980 ft), both engines failed and the captain decided to make an emergency landing on a highway – Bundesautobahn 7 (also part of European route E45) – about 4.5 km (2.8 mi; 2.4 nmi) from Hamburg Airport. During the landing, on the south-bound carriageway to avoid heavy traffic out of Hamburg, the aircraft deflected to the left and collided with an overpass and multiple concrete pillars, causing the right wing, cockpit, and T-tail to shear off. The rest of the fuselage broke up and skidded to a halt resting against an oak tree, and subsequently caught fire. Twenty-one passengers and one crew member died.

== Cause of the crash ==
Subsequent investigation showed that one or two of the five tanks for the water-injection engine thrust-augmentation system (used during take-off) had inadvertently been filled with kerosene instead of with demineralised water. Spraying this additional jet fuel into the engines caused them to overheat and fail shortly after take-off. Two maintenance workers for Paninternational were sentenced to prison terms in 1974.

== See also ==
- Southern Airways Flight 242 a Douglas DC-9, which crashed on April 4, 1977, during an emergency landing on a highway
- Dominicana DC-9 air crash in 1970 a DC-9 crashed due to engines contaminated with water
