= Thomas M. McLaughlin =

US pilot

- Thomas M. McLaughlin, then a 1st Lieutenant
- Born: Thomas Martin McLaughlin; 13 January 1947; Everett, Massachusetts, United States
- Died: 5 December 2010 (aged 63); Newton, Massachusetts, United States
- Spouse: Sally
- Children: 3
- Military career
- Branch: US Air Force
- Service years: 1968–1973
- Rank: Captain
- Nickname: Tom
- Units: 12th Tactical Fighter Wing, 480th Tactical Fighter Squadron
- Conflicts: Vietnam War
- Awards: Silver Star Air Medal; Distinguished Flying Cross (with four oakleaf clusters)

Thomas M. McLaughlin (January 13, 1947 – December 5, 2010) was a US Air Force fighter pilot decorated for combat service in the Vietnam War, and face of the Time Person of the Year of 1966 representing the Baby Boomer generation.

== Early life and Time Magazine appearance ==
McLaughlin was born in Everett, Massachusetts in 1947. After graduating from Melrose High School, McLaughlin was admitted to study at Yale and majored in economics, and played American football and Lacrosse. Whilst at Yale McLaughlin was crossing campus one day when he was approached by a photographer working for Time magazine. The photograph taken was subsequently used by Time artist Robert Vickrey as the basis of the face used to illustrate the Time Man of the Year of 1966, which was dedicated to the generation then 25 years old and under. Vickrey changed the eye and hair color and made the face appear slightly younger. McLaughlin denied that Time's characterization of the Baby Boomer generation applied to him, stating that the only part of it that was true of him was that "I like Snoopy".

== Vietnam War ==
Following graduation from Yale in 1968, McLaughlin enlisted in the US Air Force and trained as a pilot.

After training, Mclaughlin deployed to South Vietnam, serving on F-4 Phantoms based at Phù Cát Air Base with the US 12th Tactical Fighter Wing. On February 25, 1971, while flying close-air support missions during Operation Lam Son 719 for South Vietnamese Army of the Republic of Vietnam (ARVN) forces at Fire Support Base 31 (FSB 31) (16.715°N 106.426°E), 1st Lieutenant McLaughlin's Phantom was shot down and both McLaughlin and his fellow crew member, Captain David Hedditch, were forced to eject. McLaughlin and Hedditch landed next to a North Vietnamese People's Army of Vietnam (PAVN) mortar position, though the PAVN soldiers did not see them. Multiple helicopter rescues of McLaughlin and Hedditch were attempted, but each time they were driven off by PAVN 37mm anti-aircraft guns, forcing the men to spend the night on the ground.

The following day 75 fast-jet sorties were made against PAVN positions to suppress the anti-aircraft fire, with McLaughlin and Hedditch acting as forward-air controllers. That afternoon another rescue attempt by a US HH-53C helicopter was attempted, picking up Hedditch and then picking up McLaughlin while the helicopter was exposed to PAVN fire. 13 bullet holes were counted in the helicopter after Hedditch and McLaughlin were successfully extracted.

FSB 31 was over-run by the PAVN. Writing in 1977, ARVN Major-General Nguyễn Duy Hinh stated that the base could possibly have been saved if air-support had not been diverted to the rescue effort.

McLaughlin also took part in the 1972 destruction of the Paul Doumer bridge over the Red River in North Vietnam.

== Subsequent life ==
McLaughlin, who had expressed disillusionment about the Vietnam War after the release of the Pentagon Papers, decided to leave the Air Force in 1973. He subsequently studied at Harvard Business School, and after graduation in 1977 worked on Wall Street before going into real estate.

Mclaughlin died in 2010 at the age of 63 from a rare cancer of a type that has been linked to military service in Vietnam. He was survived by his wife Sally, and three adult sons Brian, Christian, and Thomas.
