= Operation Lam Son 719 =

Part of the Vietnam War (1971)

- Part of the Laotian Civil War and the Vietnam War
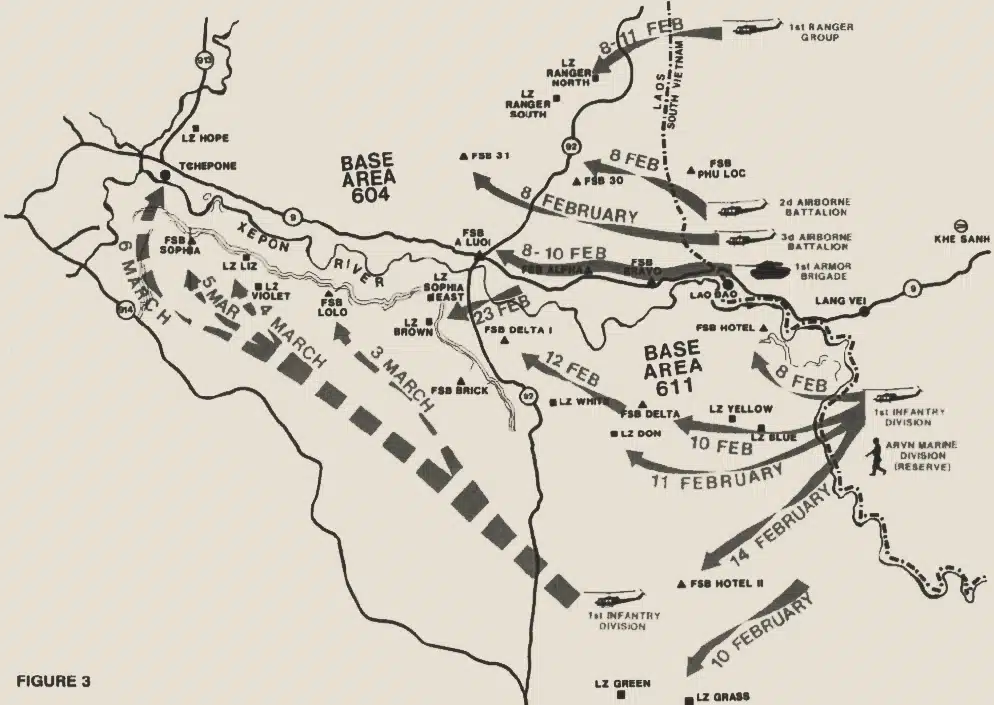
- Fire support bases and movement of forces
Date	8 February – 25 March 1971 (1 month, 2 weeks and 3 days)
Location	Southeastern Laos
Result	See Aftermath

Belligerents
South Vietnam; United States; Kingdom of Laos	North Vietnam (Provisional Revolutionary Government of the Republic of South Vietnam) Viet Cong (Laos) Pathet Lao

Commanders and leaders
(South Vietnam) Hoàng Xuân Lãm (South Vietnam) Dư Quốc Đống (South Vietnam) Lê Nguyên Khang (South Vietnam) Phạm Văn Phú (United States) Creighton Abrams (United States) James W. Sutherland (United States) John G. Hill Jr.	(North Vietnam) Lê Trọng Tấn (Military) (North Vietnam) Lê Quang Đạo (Political) (North Vietnam) Cao Văn Khánh (Regional)

Units involved
(South Vietnam) I Corps Tactical Zone: Marine Division; Airborne Division; 1st Infantry Division; 2nd Infantry Division; 1st Armored Brigade; 3rd Armored Brigade; (South Vietnam) 1st Ranger Group: 21st Ranger Battalion; 39th Ranger Battalion; (United States) XXIV Corps (only within South Vietnam): 5th Infantry Division; 1st Brigade; 23rd Infantry Division; 11th Infantry Brigade; 45th Engineer Group; 101st Aviation Group; 108th Artillery Group; Seventh Air Force (Laos) GM30 and GM33	Command 702: B-70 Corps; 304th Division; 308th Division; 320th Division; 2nd Division; 324B Division; 367th Air Defense Division; 7th, 83rd and 219th Engineer Regiments; 38th, 45th and 38th Artillery Regiments; 230th, 241st and 591st Anti-Aircraft Regiments; Group 559: Unit B4; Unit B5; Squadron 559

Strength
21,000 troops with additional 10,000 support troop (United States) 10,000 – 15,000 support troops (in South Vietnam) (Laos) ~4,000 troops	~25,000 to ~35,000 troops 88 tanks

Casualties and losses
(South Vietnam) Per South Vietnam; 1,146–8,843 killed 4,236–12,420 wounded 1,767 missing/captured (United States) Per US; 215 killed 1,149 wounded 38 missing Materiel (US/ARVN): 32+ artillery pieces destroyed, 82 captured 7 aircraft lost 108 helicopters destroyed and 618 damaged (20% badly damaged beyond repair); 71 tanks, 163 armoured combat vehicles, 37 half-trucks, 278 trucks destroyed	Per North Vietnam 2,163 killed and 6,176 wounded 23 tanks destroyed South Vietnam claimed 19,360 killed 670 anti-aircraft guns destroyed 422–600 trucks destroyed 88–106 tanks destroyed

Operation Lam Son 719 or 9th Route – Southern Laos Campaign (Vietnamese: Chiến dịch Lam Sơn 719 or Chiến dịch đường 9 – Nam Lào) was a limited-objective offensive campaign conducted in the southeastern portion of the Kingdom of Laos. The campaign was carried out by the armed forces of South Vietnam between 8 February and 25 March 1971, during the Vietnam War. The United States provided logistical, aerial and artillery support for the operation, but its ground forces were prohibited by law from entering Laotian territory. The objective of the campaign was the disruption of a possible future offensive by the People's Army of Vietnam (PAVN), whose logistical system within Laos was known as the Ho Chi Minh Trail (the Truong Son Road to North Vietnam).

By launching a pre-emptive attack against the PAVN's long-established logistical system, the American and South Vietnamese high commands hoped to resolve several pressing issues. A quick victory in Laos would bolster the morale and confidence of the Army of the Republic of Vietnam (ARVN), which was already high in the wake of the successful Cambodian Campaign of 1970. It would also serve as proof that South Vietnamese forces could defend their nation in the face of the continuing Vietnamization withdrawal of U.S. ground combat forces from the theater. The operation would be, therefore, a test of that policy and the ARVN's capability to operate effectively by itself.

However, due to PAVN and the Viet Cong's (VC) intelligence and preparation beforehand, an inability by the political and military leaders of the U.S. and South Vietnam to face military realities, and poor execution, Operation Lam Son 719 collapsed when faced by the determined resistance of a skillful foe. The campaign demonstrated continued deficiencies in ARVN military leadership and that the best units of the ARVN could be defeated by the PAVN, destroying the confidence that had been built up over the previous three years.

== Background ==
Between 1959 and 1970, the Ho Chi Minh Trail had become the key logistical artery for the PAVN/VC, in their effort to conduct military operations to topple the U.S.-supported government of South Vietnam and create a unified nation. Running from the southwestern corner of North Vietnam through southeastern Laos and into the western portions of South Vietnam, the trail system had been the target of continuous U.S. aerial interdiction efforts that had begun in 1966. Only small-scale covert operations in support of the air campaigns had, however, been conducted on the ground inside Laos to halt the flow of men and supplies on the trail.

Since 1966, over 630,000 men, 100,000 tons of foodstuffs, 400,000 weapons and 50,000 tons of ammunition had traveled through the maze of gravel and dirt roads, paths and river transportation systems that crisscrossed southeastern Laos. The trail also linked up with a similar logistical system in neighboring Cambodia known as the Sihanouk Trail. However, following the overthrow of Prince Norodom Sihanouk in 1970, the pro-American Lon Nol regime had denied the use of the port of Sihanoukville to communist shipping. Strategically, this was an enormous blow to the North Vietnamese effort, since 70 percent of all military supplies that supported its effort in the far south had moved through the port. A further blow to the logistical system in Cambodia had come in the spring and summer of 1970, when U.S. and ARVN forces had crossed the border and attacked PAVN/VC Base Areas during the Cambodian Campaign.

With the partial destruction of the North Vietnamese logistical system in Cambodia, the U.S. headquarters in Saigon determined that the time was propitious for a similar campaign in Laos. If such an operation were to be carried out, the U.S. command believed, it would be best to do it quickly, while American military assets were still available in South Vietnam. Such an operation would create supply shortages that would be felt by PAVN/VC forces 12–18 months later, as the last U.S. troops were leaving South Vietnam and thereby give the U.S. and its ally a respite from a possible PAVN/VC offensive in the northern provinces for one year, possibly even two.

There were increasing signs of heavy logistical activity in southeastern Laos, activity which heralded just such a North Vietnamese offensive. PAVN offensives usually took place near the conclusion of the Laotian dry season (from October through March) and, for PAVN logistical forces, the push to move supplies through the system came during the height of the season. One U.S. intelligence report estimated that 90 percent of materiel coming down the Ho Chi Minh Trail was being funneled into the three northernmost provinces of South Vietnam, indicating forward stockpiling in preparation for offensive action. This build-up was alarming to both Washington and the American command, and prompted the perceived necessity for a spoiling attack to derail future North Vietnamese objectives.

=== Planning ===
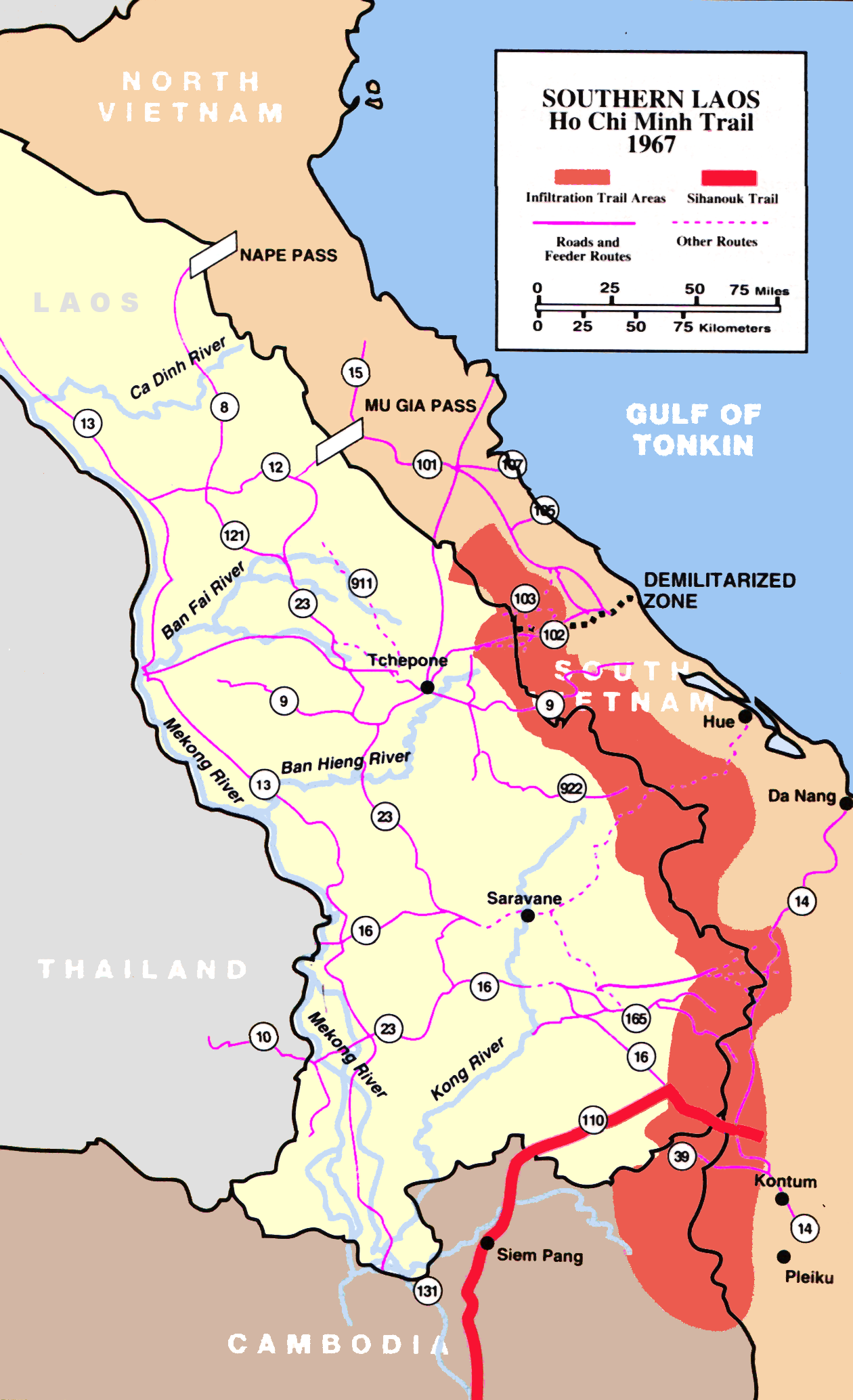
Map showing the Ho Chi Minh Trail

On 8 December 1970, in response to a request from the Joint Chiefs of Staff, a highly secret meeting was held at the Military Assistance Command, Vietnam's (MACV) Saigon headquarters to discuss the possibility of an ARVN cross-border attack into southeastern Laos. According to General Creighton W. Abrams, the American commander in South Vietnam, the main impetus for the offensive came from Colonel Alexander M. Haig, an aide to National Security Advisor Dr. Henry Kissinger. MACV had been disturbed by intelligence of a PAVN logistical build-up in southeastern Laos, but was reluctant to let the ARVN go it alone against the North Vietnamese. The group's findings were then sent on to the Joint Chiefs in Washington, D.C. By mid-December, President Richard M. Nixon had also become intrigued by possible offensive actions in Laos and had begun efforts to convince both Abrams and the members of his cabinet of the efficacy of a cross-border attack.

Abrams felt that undue pressure was being exerted on Nixon by Haig, but Haig later wrote that the military was lacking in enthusiasm for such an operation and that "prodded remorselessly by Nixon and Kissinger, the Pentagon finally devised a plan" for the Laotian operation. Other possible benefits which might accrue from such an operation were also being discussed. Admiral John S. McCain Jr (CINCPAC) communicated with Admiral Thomas Moorer, chairman of the Joint Chiefs, that an offensive against the Ho Chi Minh Trail might compel Prince Souvanna Phouma, prime minister of Laos, "to abandon the guise of neutrality and enter the war openly." Although technically neutral, the Laotian government had allowed the CIA and U.S. Air Force to conduct a covert war against an indigenous guerrilla insurgency (the Pathet Lao), that was, in turn, heavily supported by North Vietnamese forces.

On 7 January 1971 MACV was authorized to begin detailed planning for an attack against PAVN Base Areas 604 and 611. The task was given to the commander of XXIV Corps, Lieutenant General James W. Sutherland, who had only nine days to submit it to MACV for approval. The operation would consist of four phases. During the first phase U.S. forces inside South Vietnam would seize the border approaches and conduct diversionary operations. Next would come an ARVN armored/infantry attack along Route 9 toward the Laotian town of Tchepone, the perceived nexus of Base Area 604. The village was estimated to have had about 1,500 inhabitants in 1960; five years later, half of the residents had fled due to war; Operation Lam Son 719 then destroyed the village and left it deserted. This advance would be protected by a series of leap-frogging aerial infantry assaults to cover the northern and southern flanks of the main column. During the third phase, search and destroy operations within Base Area 604 would be carried out and finally, the South Vietnamese force would retire either back along Route 9 or through Base Area 611 and exit through the A Shau Valley. It was hoped that the force could remain in Laos until the rainy season was underway at the beginning of May. U.S. planners had previously estimated that such an operation would require the commitment of four U.S. divisions (60,000 men), while Saigon would only commit a force less than half that size.

Because of the notorious laxity of the South Vietnamese military when it came to security precautions and the ability of VC agents to uncover operational information, the planning phase lasted only a few weeks and was divided between the American and Vietnamese high commands. At the lower levels, it was limited to the intelligence and operational staffs of ARVN's I Corps, under Lieutenant General Hoàng Xuân Lãm, who was to command the operation and the XXIV Corps, headed by Sutherland. When Lãm was finally briefed by MACV and the South Vietnamese Joint General Staff in Saigon, his chief of operations was forbidden to attend the meeting, even though he had helped to write the very plan under discussion. At this meeting, Lãm's operational area was restricted to a corridor no wider than 15 miles (24 km) on either side of Route 9 and a penetration no deeper than Tchepone.

Command, control and coordination of the operation was going to be problematic, especially in the highly politicized South Vietnamese command structure, where the support of key political figures was of paramount importance in promotion to and retention of command positions. Lieutenant General Lê Nguyên Khang, the Vietnamese Marine Corps commander and protege of Vice President Nguyễn Cao Kỳ, whose troops were scheduled to participate in the operation, actually outranked General Lãm, who had the support of President Nguyễn Văn Thiệu. The same situation applied to Lieutenant General Dư Quốc Đống, commander of ARVN Airborne Division also scheduled to participate in the operation. After the incursion began, both men remained in Saigon and delegated their command authority to junior officers rather than take orders from Lãm. This did not bode well for the success of the operation.

Individual units did not learn about their planned participation until 17 January. The Airborne Division that was to lead the operation received no detailed plans until 2 February, less than a week before the campaign was to begin. This was of crucial importance, since many of the units, particularly the Airborne and the Marines, had worked as separate battalions and brigades and had no experience maneuvering or cooperating in adjoining areas. According to the assistant commander of the U.S. 101st Airborne Division, "Planning was rushed, handicapped by security restrictions, and conducted separately and in isolation by the Vietnamese and the Americans."

The U.S. portion of the operation was to bear the title Dewey Canyon II, named for Operation Dewey Canyon conducted by U.S. Marines in the northwestern South Vietnam in 1969. It was hoped that the reference to the previous operation would confuse Hanoi as to the actual target of the proposed incursion. The ARVN's portion was given the title Lam Son 719, after the village of Lam Son, birthplace of the legendary Vietnamese patriot Lê Lợi, who had defeated an invading Chinese army in 1427. The numerical designation came from the year, 1971, and the main axis of the attack, Route 9.

The decisions had been made at the highest levels and planning had been completed, but valuable time had been lost. The South Vietnamese were about to begin their largest, most complex, and most important operation of the war. The lack of time for adequate planning and preparation, as well as the absence of any real questioning about military realities and the capabilities of the ARVN were going to prove decisive. On 29 January Nixon gave his final approval for the operation. On the following day, Operation Dewey Canyon II was under way.

== Operations ==
=== Dewey Canyon II ===
Any offensive planning by the U.S. was, however, limited by the passage on 29 December 1970 of the Cooper-Church Amendment, which prohibited U.S. ground forces and advisors from entering Laos. Dewey Canyon II would, therefore, be conducted within territorial South Vietnam in order to reopen Route 9 all the way to the old Khe Sanh Combat Base, which had been abandoned by U.S. forces in 1968. The base would be reopened and would then serve as the logistical hub and airhead of the ARVN incursion. U.S. combat engineers were tasked with clearing Route 9 and rehabilitating Khe Sanh while infantry and mechanized units secured a line of communications along the length of the road. U.S. artillery units would support the ARVN effort within Laos from the South Vietnamese side of the border while Army logisticians coordinated the entire supply effort for the South Vietnamese. Air support for the incursion would be provided by the aircraft of the United States Air Force (USAF), Navy and Marine Corps and U.S. Army aviation units were tasked with providing complete helicopter support for the ARVN.

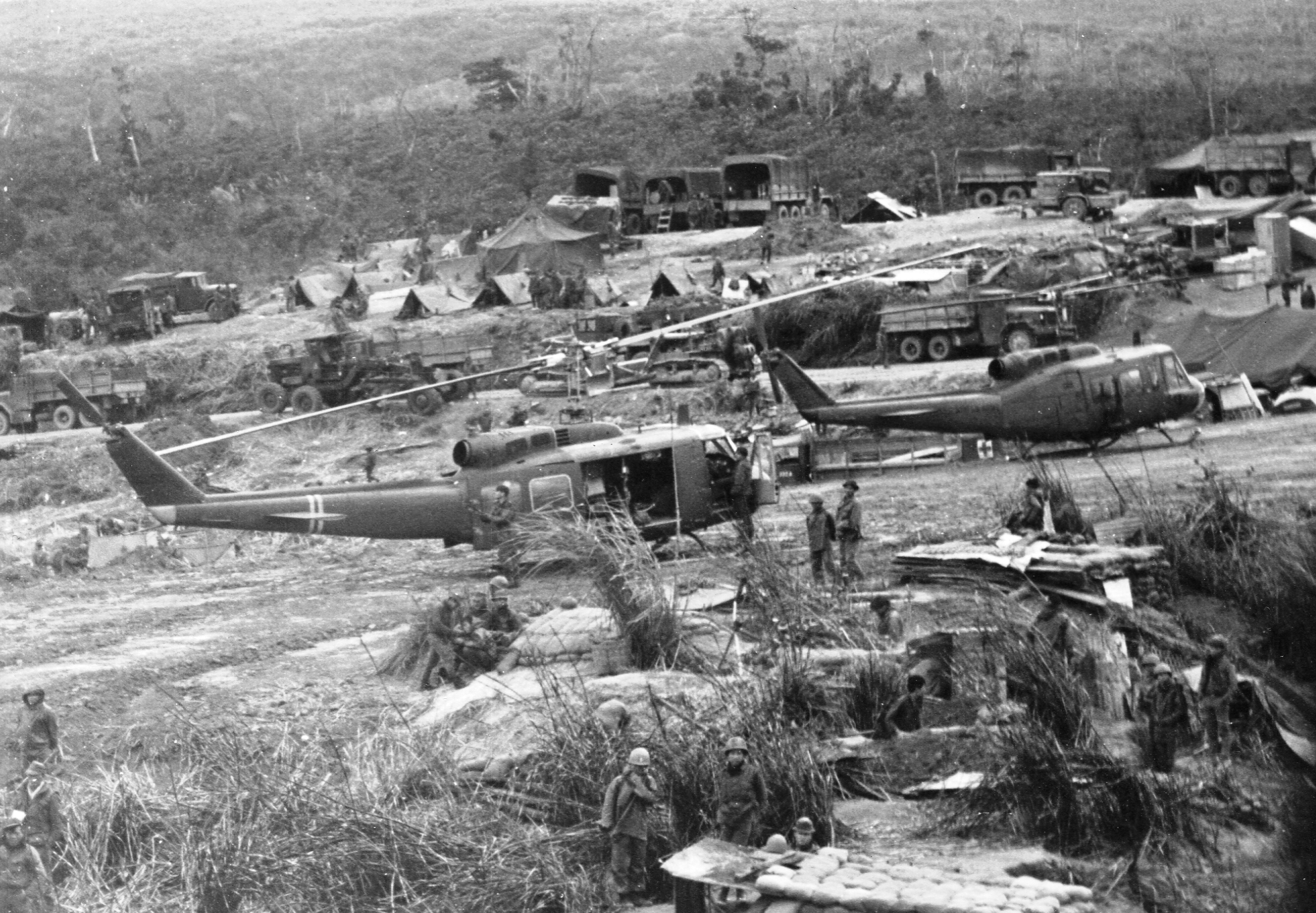
Helicopters and supply vehicles at Khe Sanh, 12 February 1971

U.S. forces earmarked for these missions included: four battalions of the 108th Artillery Group; two battalions of the 45th Engineer Group; the 101st Airborne Division; six battalions of the 101st Aviation Group; the 1st Brigade of the 5th (Mechanized) Infantry Division (reinforced by two mechanized, one cavalry, one tank and one airmobile infantry battalions); and the two battalions of the 11th Infantry Brigade of the 23rd Infantry Division.

On the morning of 30 January, armored elements of the 1st Brigade, 5th Infantry Division and the 14th Engineer Battalion headed west on Route 9 with the engineers installing nine bridges and nine culverts as they progressed. Meanwhile, the brigade's infantry elements were choppered directly into the Khe Sanh area. By 5 February, Route 9 had been secured up to the Laotian frontier. Simultaneously, the 101st Airborne Division began a feint into the A Shau Valley in order to draw PAVN attention away from Khe Sanh. At the combat base, poor weather, obstacles, land mines and unexploded ordnance pushed the rehabilitation of the airstrip (estimated by U.S. engineers at four days) a week behind schedule. As a response, a completely new airstrip had to be built and the first aircraft arrived on 15 February. On 3 February the U.S. 7th Combat Engineer Battalion using three D7 bulldozers began construction of a pioneer road directly from The Rockpile to Khe Sanh Combat Base to supplement the narrow and poorly maintained Route 9. The pioneer road, named the Red Devil Road, was opened to tracked vehicles on the afternoon of 8 February. The U.S. Battery A, 5th Battalion, 4th Field Artillery Regiment established Fire Support Base (FSB) Phu Loc (16.688°N 106.577°E) northwest of Khe Sanh to provide long-range artillery support for the ARVN. PAVN resistance was almost nonexistent and American casualties were light; with no previous allied presence around Khe Sanh, the North Vietnamese had seen no need to maintain large forces in the area. However, Sutherland believed that the advance to Khe Sanh had been a race between American and PAVN forces and the U.S. had won.

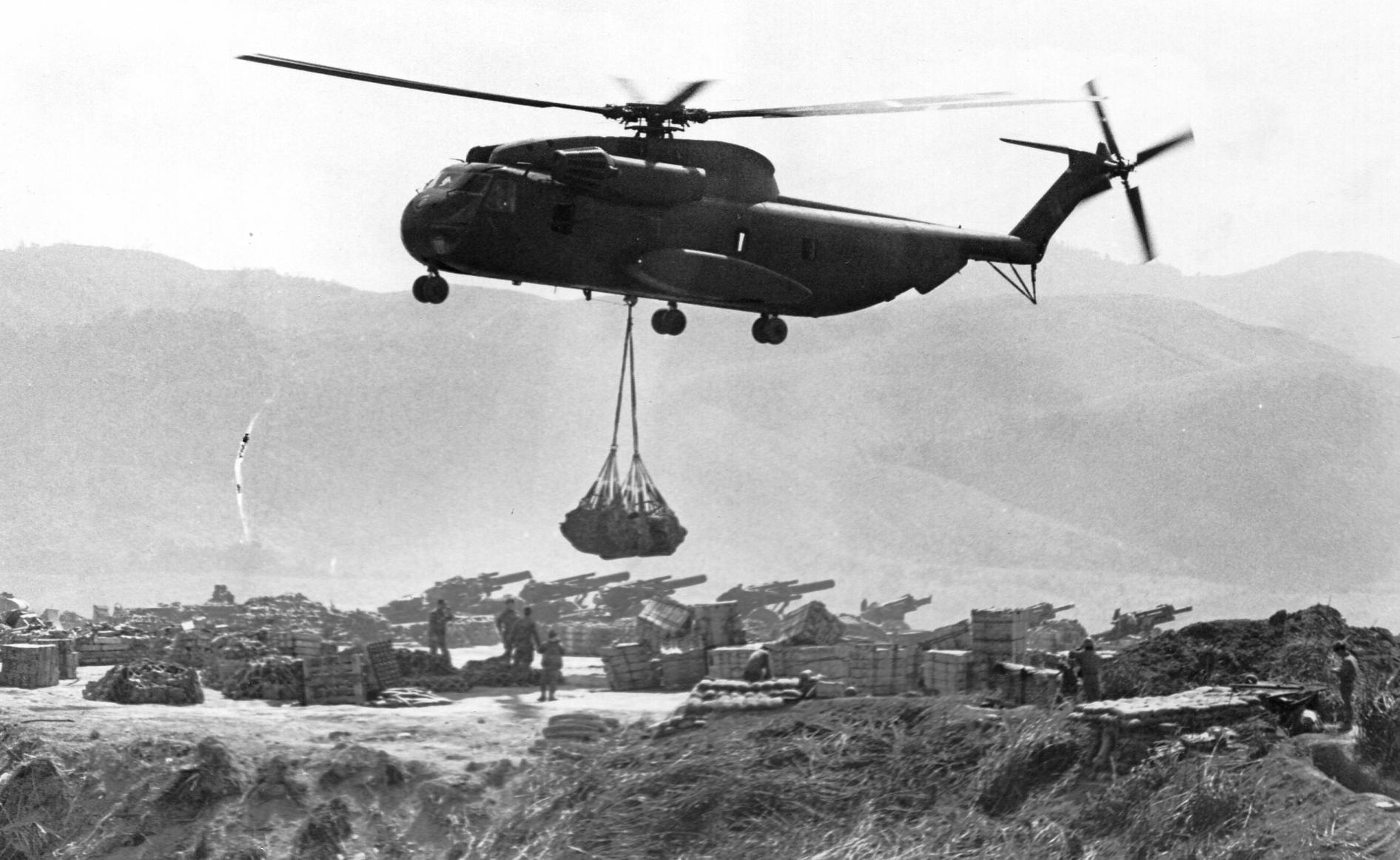
HMH-463 CH-53D transports ammunition at Lang Vei

A Direct Air Support Control Center (DASC), DASC Victor was established on 31 January at Quảng Trị Combat Base becoming operational on 7 February and Forward Air Controllers (FACs) from the 23rd Tactical Air Support Squadron were deployed there to support the operation, operating under the control of DASC Victor with the call sign Hammer. At any time during daylight six FACS would be over the operational area with a seventh roaming FAC to act as an artillery spotter. At night three FACs, three C-123 flareships and three gunships (AC-119s and/or AC-130s) were on station. The 7th Expeditionary Airborne Command and Control Squadron's EC-130E Airborne Battlefield Command and Control Center (ABCCC) aircraft, call sign Hillsboro/Moonbeam controlled the air space over Laos.

In order to preserve the security of the upcoming South Vietnamese operation, Abrams had imposed a rare press embargo on the reporting of troop movements, but it was to no avail. Communist and non-American news agencies released reports of the build-up and even before the lifting of the embargo on 4 February, speculation concerning the offensive was front page news in the U.S. As had been the case during the Cambodian campaign, the government of Laos was not notified in advance of the intended operation. Prime Minister Souvanna Phouma would learn of the invasion of the PAVN occupied portions of his supposedly "neutral" nation only after it was under way.

=== Offensive ===
By early 1971, PAVN troop strength in the Base Area 604 area was estimated by U.S. intelligence at 22,000 men: 7,000 combat troops, 10,000 personnel in logistical and support units and 5,000 Pathet Lao, all under the command of the newly created B-70 Corps. There were differing views on what the expected reaction of the PAVN to the offensive might be. Abrams believed that unlike Cambodia, the North Vietnamese would stand and fight for the Laotian Base Areas. As early as 11 December he had reported to Admiral McCain that:

strong infantry, armor, and artillery formations were in southern Laos...formidable air defenses were deployed...the mountainous, jungle-covered terrain was an added liability. Natural clearings for helicopter landing zones were scarce and likely to be heavily defended. The bulk of the enemy's combat units were in the vicinity of Tchepone and [PAVN] could be expected to defend his base areas and logistics centers against any allied operation.

A prescient CIA study released in December 1970 echoed Abrams' concerns and was supported by a 21 January memorandum which "was remarkably accurate with respect to the nature, pattern, and all-out intensity of [PAVN] reactions."

MACV intelligence, on the other hand was convinced that the incursion would be only lightly opposed. Tactical air strikes and artillery preparations would neutralize the estimated 170 to 200 anti-aircraft artillery weapons believed to be in the area, and the threat posed by PAVN armored units was considered minimal. North Vietnamese reinforcement capability was set at 14 days by two divisions north of the DMZ and it was hoped that diversionary operations would occupy them for the duration of the operation. Unfortunately, when North Vietnamese reinforcements did arrive, they did not come from the north as expected, but from Base Area 611 and the A Shau Valley to the south, where eight regiments, all supported by organic artillery units, were within two weeks marching range.

The North Vietnamese were expecting some sort of operation as early as 26 January when the text of an intercepted radio message read "It has been determined that the enemy may strike into our cargo carrier system in order to cut it off...Prepare to mobilize and strike the enemy hard. Be vigilant."

The tactical air strikes that were to precede the incursion and suppress known anti-aircraft positions were suspended two days prior to the operation due to poor flying weather. On 6 February a U.S. Navy A-6 Intruder accidentally bombed the 8th Airborne Battalion near the border, killing seven ARVN and destroying an M113 APC. After a massive preliminary artillery bombardment and 11 B-52 Stratofortress missions, the incursion began on 8 February, when a 4,000-man ARVN armor/infantry task force consisting of the 1st Armored Brigade and the 1st and 8th Airborne Battalions, advanced west unopposed along Route 9. To cover the northern flank, ARVN Airborne and Ranger elements were deployed to the north of the main advance. The 39th Ranger Battalion was helilifted into a Landing Zone (LZ) known as Ranger North (16.744°N 106.493°E) while the 21st Ranger Battalion moved into Ranger South (16.736°N 106.472°E). These outposts were to serve as tripwires for any PAVN advance into the zone of the ARVN incursion. Meanwhile, the 2nd Airborne Battalion occupied FSB 30 (16.696°N 106.486°E). At 16:55 U.S. helicopter gunships attacked a suspected PAVN target 2 km east of the planned FSB 31 (16.715°N 106.426°E), causing numerous secondary explosions and starting a huge fire which lasted until the following morning. Following this attack the 3rd Airborne Brigade headquarters and the 3rd Airborne Battalion landed and occupied FSB 31 unopposed. Troops of the 1st Infantry Division simultaneously combat assaulted into LZs Blue, Don, White and Brown and FSBs Hotel, Delta and Delta 1, covering the southern flank of the main advance.

The mission of the ARVN central column was to advance down the valley of the Sepon River, a relatively flat area of brush interspersed with patches of jungle and dominated by heights to its north and the river and more mountains to the south. Almost immediately, supporting helicopters began to take fire from the heights, which allowed PAVN gunners to fire down on the aircraft from pre-registered machine gun and mortar positions. Making matters worse for the advance, Route 9 was in poor condition, so poor in fact that only tracked vehicles and jeeps could make the westward journey. This threw the burden of reinforcement and resupply onto the aviation assets. The helicopter units then became the essential mode of logistical support, a role that was made increasingly more dangerous due to low cloud cover and incessant anti-aircraft fire.

The armored task force secured Route 9 all the way to Ban Dong (known to the Americans as A Luoi) (16.635°N 106.428°E), 20 kilometers inside Laos and approximately halfway to Tchepone. The ARVN and U.S. forces soon discovered the extensive PAVN logistics network within the area. At 12:30 on 10 February troops of the 3rd Airborne Battalion operating 1 km east of FSB 31 were engaged by PAVN, they suffered light casualties, but captured six Molotova trucks loaded with ammunition. Extending their search north they found a cache of 14 82 mm mortars, four 122 mm rocket launchers and nine AK-47s. At 13:00 four RVNAF UH-1H helicopters flying to Ranger South were hit by 37 mm anti-aircraft fire, with two being shot down, killing all on board. On one helicopter were two ARVN colonels, the G3 (operations officer) and G4 (logistics officer) of I Corps and on the other helicopter were foreign correspondents Larry Burrows, Henri Huet, Kent Potter and Keisaburo Shimamoto.

By 11 February FSB A Luoi had become the central fire base and command center for the operation with six 105 mm howitzers and six 155 mm howitzers. On the afternoon of 11 February the Airborne and armored units patrolling north of FSB A Luoi engaged a PAVN unit losing two M113 armored personnel carriers destroyed and one killed. That same afternoon the 3/1 Battalion, 1st Infantry Division was landed at LZ Don (16.521°N 106.522°E), at 16:15 they investigated an area 1 km south of LZ Don which had been hit by airstrikes and found 23 PAVN dead, two 12.7mm machine guns, four AK-47s and a radio. At 18:25 the 21st Ranger Battalion engaged the PAVN 4 km northeast of Ranger South killing 11 PAVN. On the evening of 11 February Forward Support Area 26-1 at Vandegrift Combat Base was hit by six 122 mm rockets, killing four U.S. troops.

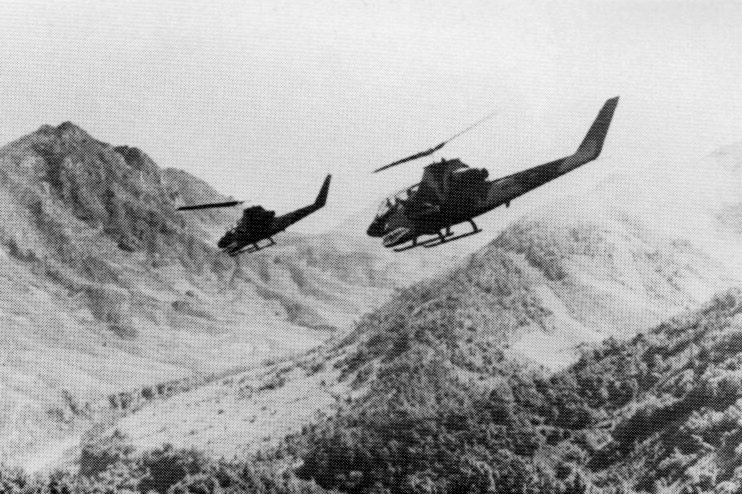
U.S. Army AH-1 Cobra attack helicopters over Laos

On the morning of 12 February a unit of the 2nd Airborne Battalion engaged a PAVN force 5 km southwest of FSB 30 killing 32 PAVN and capturing 20 individual and three crew-served weapons for the loss of three killed. At 11:00 the 37th Ranger Battalion operating 3 km north-northwest of FSB Phu Loc (16.687°N 106.577°E) which protected the northwest approaches to Khe Sanh engaged a PAVN force, four Rangers were killed and one AH-1G Cobra helicopter gunship was shot down while 13 PAVN were killed and one captured together with 10 AK-47s. That afternoon the 3/1 Battalion found a weapons cache 3 km south-southwest of LZ Don containing 600 individual weapons and 50 PAVN killed by airstrikes. Later that afternoon the 1/1 Battalion found a PAVN camp 3 km south of LZ Don.

On 13 February in order to secure FSB 31 it was planned to land the 6th Airborne Battalion on a mountain range northwest of the base to control a valley running southeast to FSB 31. Despite preparatory B-52 strikes the first helicopters transporting the 6th Airborne were met by heavy fire and the remaining helicopters were diverted to alternate sites. The 6th Airborne continued to receive fire and eventually withdrew to FSB 31 having lost 28 killed and 23 missing. That afternoon the 39th Ranger Battalion engaged a PAVN force 3 km west-southwest of Ranger North killing 43 PAVN for the loss one killed and capturing two 37 mm anti-aircraft guns and two 12.7mm machine guns and large quantities of ammunition. The 3/1 Battalion found a supply cache containing 30 75 mm recoilless rifles and 50 55-gallon drums of gasoline. Meanwhile, the 2/3 Battalion operating 6 km north-northeast of LZ found three trucks. That afternoon the 1/1 Battalion engaged a PAVN unit 3 km south-southwest of LZ Don killing 28 and capturing a storage area containing seven RPDs and large quantities of food.

At 14:30 on 14 February FSB 31 was hit by rockets resulting six killed. At midday on 15 February FSB 31 was hit by 122 mm rockets, killing two. On the afternoon of 15 February the 17th Armored Squadron operating 3 km north of A Luoi found two trucks and six tons of rice. On 16 February the 2/3 Infantry Battalion, 1st Infantry Division was landed at LZ Grass (16.418°N 106.584°E) 12 km northeast of Muong Nong to push further into Base Area 611. LZ Grass would be the southernmost position occupied by the ARVN during the operation. While the plan called for a quick ground thrust to secure the main objective of Tchepone, the South Vietnamese forces had stalled at A Luoi while awaiting orders to proceed from General Lãm. Abrams and Sutherland flew to Lam's forward command post at Đông Hà in order to speed up the timetable. At the meeting of the generals, it was instead decided to extend the 1st Division's line of outposts south of Route 9 westward to cover the projected advance. This would take an additional five days.

Back in Washington, Secretary of Defense Melvin Laird and the Joint Chiefs tried to refute claims by reporters that the South Vietnamese advance had stalled. At a press conference, Laird claimed that the halt at A Luoi was simply a "pause" that was giving ARVN commanders a chance to "watch and assess enemy movements...The operation is going according to plan."

On 17 February heavy rain restricted air operations however an armored infantry task force consisting of the 17th Armored Squadron and 8th Airborne Battalion operating north of A Luoi had been engaging the PAVN killing 36 and capturing 16 AK-47s for the loss of four killed. At midday the task force engaged another PAVN force 4 km north of Al Luoi capturing one PT-76, two trucks and three machine guns. On the morning of 18 February the 1st Airborne Battalion conducting a B-52 bomb damage assessment 2 km north of LZ Bravo found an abandoned command post of the PAVN 308th Division. At midday U.S. air cavalry forces attacked a PAVN truck convoy 9 km west-northwest of A Luoi, while the 2nd Troop, 17th Armored Squadron operating 7 km west of A Luoi found and cut a fuel pipeline.

== Response ==
=== Counteroffensive ===
The North Vietnamese response to the incursion was gradual. Hanoi's attention was riveted on another diversionary maneuver being conducted by a U.S. naval task force off the coast of the North Vietnam. This force conducted all of the maneuvers necessary for the carrying out of an amphibious landing only 20 kilometers off the city of Vinh. Hanoi's preoccupation with a possible invasion did not last long. Its B-70 Corps commanded three divisions in the incursion area, the 304th, 308th and 320th. The 2nd Division had also moved up from the south to the Tchepone area and then began to move east to meet the ARVN threat. By early March, Hanoi had massed 36,000 troops in the area, outnumbering the South Vietnamese force by two-to-one.

The method chosen by the PAVN to defeat the invasion was to first isolate the northern firebases by utilizing anti-aircraft artillery. The outposts would then be pounded by round-the-clock mortar, artillery and rocket fire. Although the ARVN firebases were themselves equipped with artillery, their guns were quickly outranged by the PAVN's Soviet-supplied 122 mm and 130 mm pieces, which simply stood off and pounded the positions at will. The defensive edge that could have been provided by the utilization of B-52 bomber strikes was nullified by the close-in tactics of the PAVN. Massed ground attacks, supported by artillery and armor, would then finish the job.

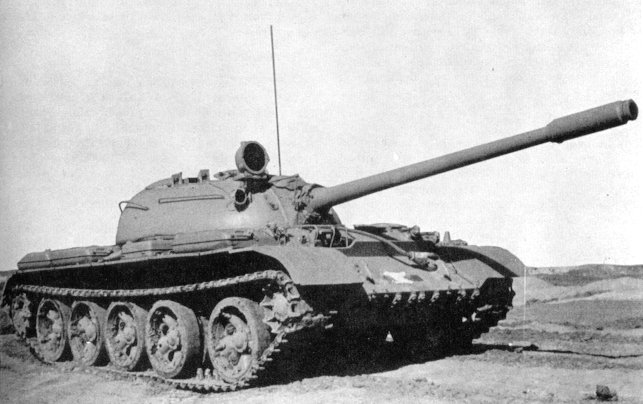
T-55 tank

As early as 18 February, PAVN forces had begun attacks by fire on bases Ranger North and South. A UH-1H medevac helicopter from the 237th Medical Detachment was hit by PAVN fire and crash-landed at Ranger North: two of its crew were rescued by another helicopter while the crew chief Sp4c. Dennis Fujii was unable to reach the rescue helicopter due to fire and stayed at the base to assist the Rangers, providing medical assistance and directing US airstrikes. On 19 February, the attacks commenced against Ranger North conducted by the 102nd Regiment, 308th Division, supported by PT-76 and T-54 tanks. The ARVN held on tenaciously throughout the night supported by gunships and flareships. Thiệu, oblivious to the previous nights attacks, and who was visiting I Corps headquarters at the time, advised Lãm to postpone the advance on Tchepone and to shift the focus of the operation toward the southwest. Despite 32 tactical airstrikes since the morning, by the afternoon of the 20th, the 39th Ranger Battalion had been reduced from 500 to 323 men and aerial reconnaissance indicated that their position was surrounded by 4–500 PAVN and its commander ordered a retreat toward Ranger South, 6 km away. Fujii and several Rangers were evacuated by helicopter, but it was hit by PAVN fire and autorotated onto Ranger South. The crew was rescued but Fujii was again stranded on the ground. Only 199 survivors reached Ranger South by nightfall, with only 109 fit for combat, while 178 were dead or missing. The U.S estimated 639 PAVN troops were killed during the battle.

North Vietnamese attention then shifted to Ranger South, which was hit by 130 mm artillery fire on the night of 21 February. On 22 February an intensive air and artillery bombardment around the base allowed 13 medevac helicopters to evacuate 122 wounded Rangers and Fujii who would later be awarded the Silver Star, later upgraded to a Distinguished Service Cross and further upgraded to the Medal of Honor The force remaining at Ranger South comprising 400 soldiers of the 21st Rangers and 109 soldiers of the 39th Rangers, held the outpost for another two days before Lãm ordered them to fight their way 5 km southeast to FSB 30.

Another casualty of the battle, although an indirect one, was South Vietnamese General Đỗ Cao Trí, commander of III Corps and hero of the Cambodian campaign. Ordered by Thiệu to take over for the outclassed Lãm, Trí died in a helicopter crash on 23 February while en route to his new command.

On 23 February FSB Hotel 2 (16.472°N 106.585°E), south of Route 9, also came under an intense artillery/infantry attack. Also on 23 February the 2nd Battalion, 3rd Infantry Regiment engaged a PAVN force near A-Ro. The 3rd Battalion was brought in to reinforce but the PAVN would not disengage. On 24 February the 1st Infantry Division commander General Phạm Văn Phú requested a B-52 strike and both battalions withdrew an hour before the strike and then attacked immediately after the strike finding 159 PAVN dead and numerous weapons.

FSB 31 was the next ARVN position to fall under the hammer. Airborne Division commander Đống had opposed stationing his elite paratroopers in static defensive positions and felt that his men's usual aggressiveness had been stifled. Vicious PAVN anti-aircraft fire made reinforcement and resupply of the firebase impossible. Đống then ordered elements of the 17th Armored Squadron to advance north from A Luoi to reinforce the base. The armored force never arrived, due to conflicting orders from Lãm and Đống that halted the armored advance several kilometers south of FSB 31. On the night of 23 February PAVN sappers were engaged on the base's west perimeter resulting in 15 killed.

On 24 February intelligence reports revealed that the PAVN had completed a new spur to the Ho Chi Minh Trail that bypassed the area of the operation.

On 25 February the PAVN deluged FSB 31 with artillery fire and then launched a conventional armored/infantry assault. Smoke, dust and haze precluded observation by the FAC aircraft, which was flying above 4,000 feet (1,200 m) to avoid anti-aircraft fire. Tactical air strikes destroyed several armored vehicles attacking the southern perimeter, but at 15:20 20 tanks supported by infantry attacked the northwest and east. At that time a USAF F-4 Phantom jet was shot down in the area, the FAC left the area of the battle to direct a rescue effort for the downed aircraft crew, diverting air-support from the base. PAVN troops and tanks then overran the position, capturing the ARVN brigade commander in the process. FSB 31 was secured by the PAVN at an estimated cost of 250 killed, and 11 PT-76 and T-54 tanks destroyed. The Airborne had suffered 155 killed and over 100 captured. At a meeting held at Đông Hà between Sutherland and Đống, the Airborne commander railed against Lãm and the Americans for not supporting his forces adequately. He was supported in his allegations by Colonel Arthur Pence, the senior U.S. advisor to the Airborne Division. Sutherland, infuriated by Pence's open support of Đống, relieved him of his duties. The two downed American aircrew, David Hedditch and Thomas M. McLaughlin, were rescued by helicopter from the area of FSB 31 the next day.

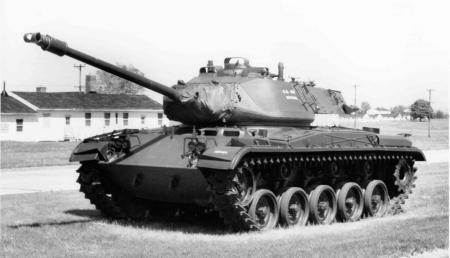
M41 Walker Bulldog, the most numerous tank of the ARVN

Between 25 February and 1 March in its efforts to relieve FSB 31 the armor-infantry task force comprising the 17th Armored Squadron, 8th Airborne Battalion and elements of the 3rd Airborne Battalion fought three major engagements on 25 February, 27 February and the night of 1 March. They lost 27 killed and one missing and three M41 Walker Bulldog tanks and 25 armored vehicles destroyed. The ARVN claimed the PAVN lost 1,130 killed, two captured, over 300 weapons captured and 17 PT-76 and six T-54s and two trucks destroyed.

On 27 February it was decided to close FSB Hotel 2 and send the 3rd Regiment northwest to interdict Route 914. That night I Corps headquarters ordered the destruction of artillery pieces at the base and for the defending unit to proceed overland to join the 3rd Regiment. The 2nd and 3rd Battalions were ordered to move their wounded north to a pickup point for medevac helicopters away from PAVN anti-aircraft guns. On the morning of 28 February these units moved through an area hit by B-52s and counted 157 PAVN dead and numerous weapons destroyed. On the morning of 1 March USAF AC-130 gunships engaged eight PAVN tanks near Route 9 approximately 8 km west of A Luoi, destroying several tanks. At midday USAF jets attacked two T-54s south of Route 9 between A Luoi and the border destroying one.

Following the fall of FSB 31 the PAVN turned their attention to FSB 30. Although the steepness of the hill on which the base was situated precluded armored attack, the PAVN artillery bombardment was very effective. On 2 March during an attempt to resupply FSB 30, helicopters had been able to extract only 10 wounded and 4 dead because 94 soldiers, including the base commander, had forced their way aboard. The PAVN launched an assault starting at 01:00 on 3 March with intense artillery fire followed by armor-infantry assaults. AC-130s and two B-52 strikes helped the 2nd Airborne to hold the position and when the attack subsided at 09:00 a search of the area revealed 98 PAVN dead, 26 AK-47s, eight B-40s and two machine-guns, while Airborne losses were one killed. However all 12 artillery pieces at the base had been damaged by artillery fire and that afternoon the 2nd Battalion was ordered to destroy its artillery pieces and abandon the base.

During the night of 3 March the 17th Armored Squadron and 8th Airborne Battalion engaged a battalion-sized PAVN force 5 km north of A Luoi killing 383 and capturing two together with 71 individual and 28 crew-served weapons. ARVN losses were over 100 killed and wounded and ten armored vehicles damaged. On the early morning of 4 March after two attempted medevacs had failed a B-52 strike took place and 77 Airborne wounded were evacuated. On 5 March an armored-Airborne column joined up with the unit and the remaining wounded were evacuated.

PAVN forces suffered horrendous numbers of casualties from aircraft and armed helicopter attacks, artillery bombardment and small arms fire. In each instance, however, the attacks were pressed home with a professional competence and determination that both impressed and shocked those that observed them. William D. Morrow, Jr., an advisor with the ARVN Airborne Division during the incursion, was succinct in his appraisal of North Vietnamese forces – "they would have defeated any army that tried the invasion." According to the official PAVN history, by March the North Vietnamese had managed to amass three infantry divisions (2nd, 304th and 308th), the 64th Regiment of the 320th Division and two independent infantry regiments (27th and 28th), eight regiments of artillery, three engineer regiments, three tank battalions, six anti-aircraft battalions, and eight sapper battalions – approximately 35,000 troops, in the battle area.

=== On to Tchepone ===
While the main South Vietnamese column stalled at A Luoi for three weeks and the Ranger and Airborne elements were fighting for their lives, Thiệu and Lãm decided to launch a face-saving airborne assault on Tchepone itself. Although American leaders and news correspondents had focused on the town as one of Lam Son 719's main objectives, the PAVN logistical network actually bypassed the ruined town to the west. If South Vietnamese forces could at least occupy Tchepone, however, Thiệu would have a political excuse for declaring "victory" and withdrawing his forces to South Vietnam.

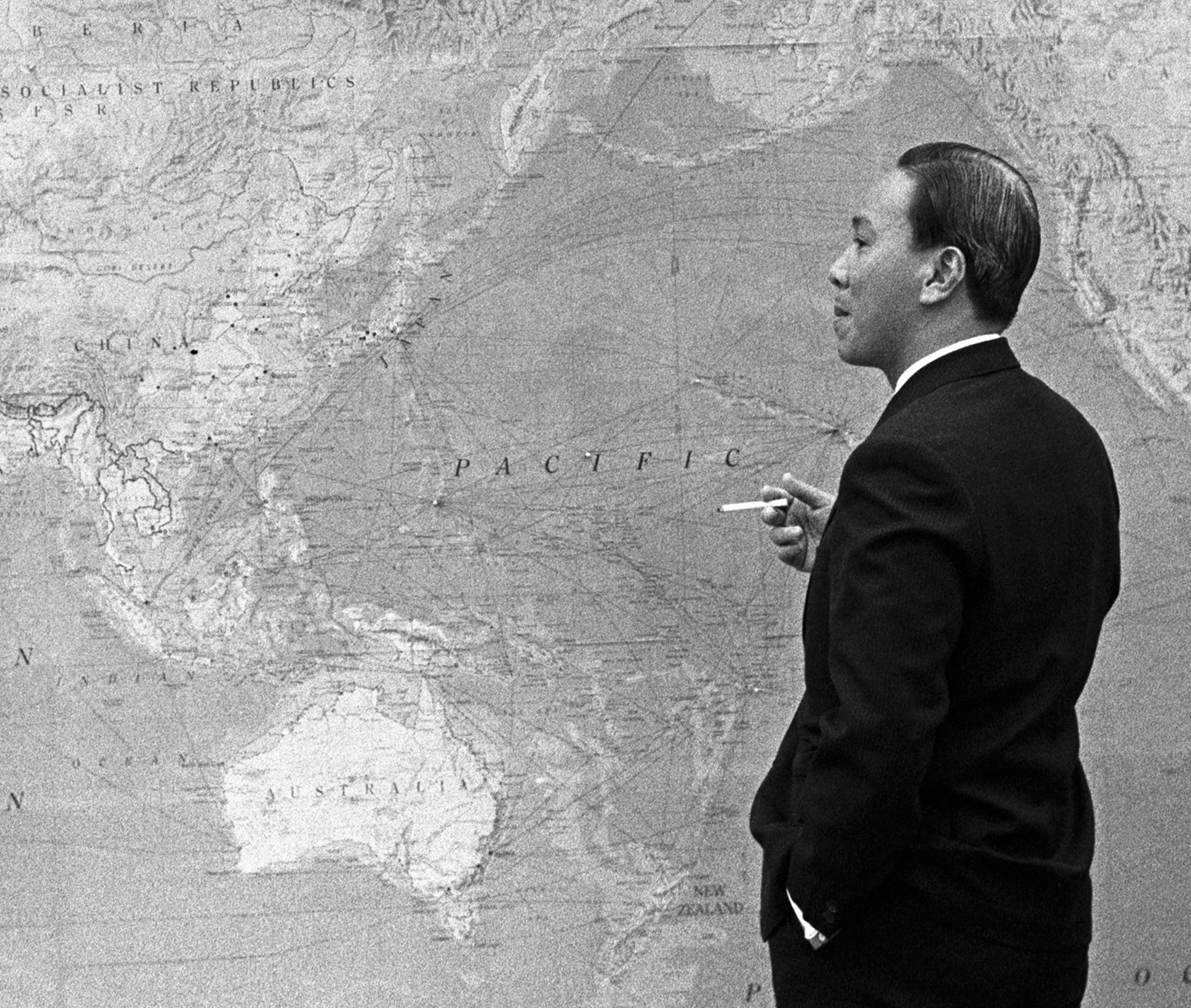
Nguyễn Văn Thiệu, President of the Republic of Vietnam

There has been some historical speculation as to Thiệu's original intentions for Lam Son 719. Some believed that he may have originally ordered his commanders to halt the operation when casualties reached 3,000 and that he had always wanted to pull out at the moment of "victory", presumably the taking of Tchepone, in order to gain political capital for the upcoming fall general and presidential elections. Regardless, the decision was made to conduct the assault not with the armored/Airborne task force, but with elements of the 1st Infantry Division. That meant that elements of the 1st Division had to be redeployed to Laos and the occupation of the firebases south of Route 9 had to be taken over by Marine Corps forces, which lost even more valuable time. On 25 February U.S. XXIV Corps ordered the 3rd Brigade, 101st Airborne Division to replace the ARVN 2nd Regiment, 1st Infantry Division on the DMZ which was moved to Khe Sanh. In addition the 4th and 7th Armored Squadrons of the 1st and 2nd Infantry Divisions were moved into Laos. The Airborne set up two FSBs Alpha and Bravo between A Luoi and the border to secure Route 9. On 2 March the 7th Battalion, 147th Marine Brigade began landing troops at FSB Delta (16.550°N 106.539°E) followed by the 2nd and 4th Battalions. The entire 258th Marine Brigade was landed at FSB Hotel. Marine operations between 2 and 5 March resulted in 361 PAVN killed and 51 weapons captured, the bodies of a further 153 PAVN killed by airstrikes were also found.

Both Abrams and Sutherland wanted the South Vietnamese to remain in Laos, reinforce the embattled units, and fight a major battle then and there. Haig, Nixon's personal military adviser, visited Sutherland in the field and noted Washington's agreement on this point as American fire support might not be available in some later battle, but the Vietnamese were hesitant.

The assault began on 3 March, when the 1st Battalion, 1st Infantry Division was helilifted into FSB Lolo (16.615°N 106.338°E) south of Route 9. Eleven helicopters were shot down and another 44 were damaged as they carried one battalion into FSB Lolo. The assault was stopped and for six hours the area was hit by airstrikes, artillery and helicopter gunships before landings resumed. On 4 March the 1st Regiment headquarters, the 2nd Battalion and a battery of 105 mm howitzers were landed at FSB Lolo. Meanwhile, after 10 hours of preparatory airstrikes, the 4th Battalion established LZ Liz (16.636°N 106.284°E), 6 km west-northwest of Lolo. 65 helicopters took part in the assault, 18 were hit with two destroyed. On the morning of 5 March the 2nd Regiment was scheduled to be landed to establish FSB Sophia (16.648°N 106.258°E) 4.5 km southwest of Tchepone, but this was delayed by bad weather. At 13:30 the first helicopters landed and by nightfall FSB Sophia had eight 105 mm howitzers in position, three helicopters were shot down during the landing. The 4th and 5th Battalions, 2nd Regiment patrolled the area around Sophia finding the bodies of 124 PAVN killed by airstrikes and 43 AK-47s, nine 12.7mm machine guns, four RPDs and nine B-40 launchers. On the morning of 5 March the 4th Marine Battalion killed 130 PAVN and captured 25 weapons, including two 82 mm mortars, while losing six killed. The 4th Battalion operating near LZ Liz killed 41 PAVN and captured 15 weapons, including two mortars.

On 6 March, 276 UH-1 helicopters protected by AH-1 Cobra gunships and fighter aircraft, lifted the 2nd and 3rd Battalions of the 2nd Regiment from Khe Sanh to Tchepone – the largest helicopter assault of the Vietnam War. Only one helicopter was downed by anti-aircraft fire as the troops combat assaulted into LZ Hope (16.69°N 106.257°E), 4 km northeast of Tchepone. By 13:43 both the 2nd and 3rd Battalions and the 2nd Regiment tactical command post had been landed at LZ Hope. Searching the area the Regiment found the bodies of 102 PAVN killed by B-52 strikes and captured five 12.7mm machine guns and one anti-aircraft gun. Moving further south towards Tchepone the 3rd Battalion found 1,000 tons of rice, 31 dead PAVN and numerous weapons. The 2nd Battalion found an area which had been hit by B-52s with nearly 100 PAVN dead and numerous destroyed weapons. On the afternoon of 6 March 22 122 mm rockets hit Khe Sanh Combat base killing two U.S. soldiers.

On the morning of 7 March the PAVN began bombarding FSB Lolo killing three ARVN. At the same time FSB A Luoi also came under heavy fire. Also that the day the elite Hac Bao Reconnaissance Company of the ARVN 1st Infantry Division was landed 5 km west-southwest of A Luoi to rescue the crew of a U.S. aircraft shot down two days earlier. The Hac Bao rescued the crew, killed 60 PAVN and captured 30 automatic rifles, destroyed an anti-aircraft gun position and found another 40 PAVN killed by airstrikes. The 2nd Battalion, 2nd Regiment on a B-52 bomb-damage assessment east of Tchepone found a destroyed weapons cache containing 150 rocket launchers, 43 grenade launchers, 17 heavy machine guns, eight 82 mm mortars and 57 AK-47s. Nearby they found two destroyed tanks and an ammunition storage area which was subsequently destroyed by a B-52 strike. Southeast of Tchepone the 4th Battalion found 112 PAVN killed by airstrikes and captured 32 mortars, five 12.7mm machine guns, six grenade launchers and 18 AK-47s. The 2nd Regiment entered Tchepone proper and engaged and killed a PAVN squad. The 2nd Battalion found a further 52 PAVN dead, three heavy machine guns and 44 rifles. At 09:00 on 9 March the 2nd Regiment returned to FSB Sophia ending operations in Tchepone. The ARVN failed to investigate the area west of Tchepone and along the Banghiang River which was suspected of containing the greatest concentration of supplies and material.

=== Retreat ===
Their goal in Laos seemingly achieved, Thiệu and Lãm ordered a withdrawal of ARVN forces beginning on 9 March that was to continue through the rest of the month, destroying Base Area 604 and any supplies discovered in their path. Abrams implored Thiệu to reinforce the troops in Laos and that they keep disrupting the area until the beginning of the rainy season. By the time this request was made, South Vietnam possessed only one Marine brigade in its entire national reserve. Thiệu responded to Abrams by requesting that U.S. forces be deployed to Laos, knowing that such an option was impossible. The battle was shifting to Hanoi's advantage, anti-aircraft fire remained devastating and the PAVN had no trouble resupplying or reinforcing their troops in the battle area. The withdrawal plan was that the 2nd Infantry Regiment would close FSB Sophia and be airlifted to establish a new FSB Brick near Route 92 9 km south of A Luoi. The 2nd Infantry Regiment would then patrol southwest searching for installations of PAVN Binh Tram 33 and interdicting Route 914. The 1st and 2nd Regiments would conduct these operations for 7–10 days. The withdrawal would then proceed in the following order: first the 1st Infantry Division units and the Airborne; FSB Lolo would close followed by FSB Brick; the 3rd Infantry Regiment in the area of LZ Brown (16.602°N 106.406°E) and FSB Delta I (16.589°N 106.451°E) would pull out after closing FSB A Luoi. After the withdrawal of the Airborne the 147th and 258th Marine Brigades would withdraw from FSBs Delta and Hotel. The withdrawal would be completed by 31 March. After rest and recuperation the units would conduct operations in the eastern part of Base Area 611, the A Shau Valley and the Laotian Salient (16.577°N 106.65°E).

As soon as it became evident that ARVN forces had begun a withdrawal, the PAVN increased its efforts to destroy them before they could reach South Vietnam. Anti-aircraft fire was increased to halt or slow helicopter resupply or evacuation efforts, the undermanned firebases were attacked and ARVN ground forces had to run a gauntlet of ambushes along Route 9.

On 9 March the 1st Infantry Regiment began moving towards Ta Luong (16.633°N 106.185°E) and advance elements sighted PAVN tanks near the area. Further north 1st Regiment observation teams saw a PAVN armored group and directed artillery fire onto it, disabling five tanks. To the southeast the Marines had been receiving heavy attacks by fire, but while searching 10 km south-southeast from their bases found a PAVN base that had been bombed by B-52s containing 5,000 heavy rockets and large quantities of destroyed weapons and ammunition.

On the morning of 10 March the 1st Marine Battalion engaged the PAVN twice killing 72 PAVN and capturing 20 weapons, a recoilless rifle and four grenade launchers for the loss of six Marines killed. The 1st Infantry Regiment searched Ta Luong and Route 914 and in two areas 10 km south and southwest of FSB Sophia found the bodies of 72 PAVN dead and 12 trucks, eight tracked vehicles, three 122 mm guns, two 37 mm anti-aircraft guns, four 12.7mm machine guns, two 122 mm rocket launchers and 400 AK-47s destroyed by B-52s and also captured five prisoners. PAVN pressure increased on FSB Sophia with a heavy attack by fire damaging six of the eight 105 mm guns.

On 11 March a reconnaissance unit operating 1 km southeast of FSB Sophia engaged a PAVN patrol killing eight. The 2nd Regiment began its withdrawal from FSB Sophia with the 2nd Battalion walking to LZ Liz and then were lifted to LZ Brown. The 5th Battalion was landed 1 km north of FSB Sophia where it joined the 2nd Regiment headquarters, while the 4th Battalion continued to hold FSB Sophia. The 1st Regiment continued its search of the Ta Luong area. On 12 March the 2nd Regiment completed its withdrawal from FSB Sophia with the eight 105 mm guns destroyed by USAF airstrikes.

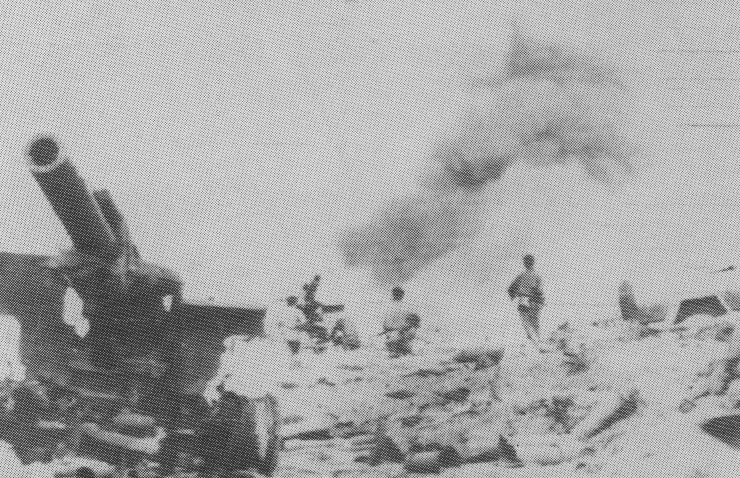
Fire Support Base Lolo falls to NVA forces

On 13 March the PAVN increased the pressure on the ARVN units in the Ta Luong area and they were forced to move north and FSB Lolo began receiving increased attacks by fire. On 14 March two United States Marine Corps A-4 Skyhawks accidentally bombed a 1st Division position killing nine ARVN. On the same day an estimated 200 122 mm rockets and 100 152 mm artillery rounds hit Lolo killing three ARVN. PAVN anti-aircraft weapons were moved closer to the base and by 15 March it could no longer be resupplied. A withdrawal was begun with the 1st Regiment headquarters and the battalions outside the base moving east, while the 4th Battalion acted as a rearguard. On 17 March the PAVN cornered the 4th Battalion near the Sepon River and in an all-day battle the battalion commander, his deputy and most of the company commanders were killed, the survivors escaped to an area near Route 9. On 18 March 32 survivors of the 4th Battalion were rescued by U.S. helicopters.

While the 1st Regiment withdrew from FSB Lolo, the 2nd Regiment continued its search southeast of FSB Sophia locating numerous destroyed logistics facilities. PAVN attacks on the Marines continued, 400 artillery rounds killed eight Marines at FSB Delta, while other Marine units continued searching the area 5 km south of FSB Delta. On the afternoon of 16 March the headquarters and 4th Battalion of the 3rd Infantry Regiment were lifted from FSB Delta 1 and returned to Khe Sanh, while the 1st Battalion remained to secure the base.

On 17 March the PAVN increased their artillery attacks on most ARVN bases supporting the operation. At FSB Delta the 7th Marine Battalion killed 16 PAVN. The 5th Battalion, 2nd Infantry Regiment engaged a PAVN force near LZ Brown killing nearly 100 and capturing a large quantity of weapons and ammunition. The headquarters of the 2nd Infantry Regiment was flown back to FSB Delta 1, while the 2nd Battalion withdrew overland.

By 18 March the PAVN were well aware of the South Vietnamese withdrawal and they began concentrating forces near FSB A Luoi and FSB Delta. At Delta the PAVN had moved anti-aircraft guns in close to the base and were pounding it with artillery fire and so the 2nd and 4th Marine Battalions patrolling to the south were withdrawn to secure the area around the base and prepare for withdrawal. At midday the 1st, 2nd and 3rd Battalions, 1st Infantry Regiment withdrawing from the Lolo area were lifted from an area 2 km southwest of FSB A Luoi and flown back to Khe Sanh. The 5th Battalion, 2nd Infantry Regiment was lifted from LZ Brown. That night the 2nd, 3rd and 4th Battalions, 2nd Infantry Regiment near LZ Brown came under attack from the PAVN with artillery fire followed by ground assaults. That night Lãm called a meeting of his Division commanders at Khe Sanh and they all recommended speeding up the withdrawal to avoid units being cut off. Following the meeting Lãm ordered the withdrawal accelerated and that plans begin for extracting the 2nd Infantry Regiment from LZ Brown and FSB Delta 1.

Overnight most Airborne battalions were in contact with the PAVN, with the 1st Battalion killing 80 PAVN and capturing five for 18 casualties, while the 2nd Battalion lost 18 killed. The Marines at FSB Delta endured further attacks but killed 42 PAVN. On the morning of 19 March the ARVN abandoned FSB A Luoi with the armored-airborne column moving east to positions near FSB Alpha (16.621°N 106.495°E). North of FSB A Luoi the 8th and 9th Airborne Battalions engaged units of the PAVN 308th and 320th Divisions. At 07:30 a FAC saw four PAVN tanks 2 km north of A Luoi. An 18 vehicle ARVN convoy was ambushed 4 km east of A Luoi with the lead vehicles destroyed by direct fire, blocking Route 9. Four M41 tanks and three M113 APCs each towing a 105 mm gun were among the vehicles stranded and airstrikes were called in to prevent them being used by the PAVN. In the Marine area the 2nd and 4th Battalions were intercepted as they withdrew towards FSB Delta and artillery fire destroyed five of the ten howitzers at the base. FSB Delta 1 was hit by numerous rockets and artillery rounds disabling four 105 mm guns and causing 1,400 106 mm rounds to explode. The 2nd, 3rd and 4th Battalions, 2nd Regiment operating near LZ Brown were involved in fighting throughout the day and into the night, supported by AC-130 gunships. At midnight the three battalions reported having consolidated their positions with the 3rd Battalion reporting 47 casualties while killing 87 PAVN and capturing 49 AK-47s; the 2nd Battalion had killed 85 PAVN and captured 47 AK-47s; and the 4th Battalion reported killing 195 PAVN and capturing 59 AK-47s. U.S. air support during the day included 686 helicopter gunship sorties, 246 tactical air strikes and 14 B-52 strikes.

At 03:00 on 21 March the PAVN 2nd Division attacked the 2nd and 4th Battalions, 2nd Infantry Regiment losing 245 killed and 52 B-40/1s, 12 mortars, eight flamethrowers, nine 12.7mm machine guns and 65 AK-47s captured for ARVN losses of 37 killed and 15 missing. The two battalions were evacuated by helicopter later that day. The headquarters 1st Airborne Brigade, the 5th Airborne Battalion and artillery units at FSB Alpha were evacuated south and FSBs Alpha and Delta 1 were closed and all ARVN forces pulled back to FSB Bravo (16.62°N 106.537°E). In the south the PAVN 29th and 803rd Regiments attacked FSB Delta at dawn starting with an intense artillery bombardment. The South Vietnamese responded with 175mm fire and the USAF conducted 13 tactical airstrikes and one B-52 strike which reportedly destroyed a PAVN battalion. The Marines at Delta held the base having lost 85 killed and 238 wounded, while PAVN losses were over 600 killed and five captured and an estimated 260 weapons captured. A resupply mission was able to support the base and evacuate wounded but one U.S. UH-1H was shot down. The PAVN continued their attacks on FSB Bravo with the 11th Armored Cavalry Squadron and 8th Airborne suffering 100 casualties and damage to four M41s and 13 APCs. A sapper attack on Vandegrift Combat Base destroyed 10,000 gallons of aviation fuel. U.S. air support during the day included 788 helicopter gunship sorties, 157 tactical airstrikes which destroyed 37 PAVN vehicles and one gun and 11 B-52 strikes.

On the night of 21 March the 1st Armored Brigade and 1st and 8th Airborne Battalions abandoned their positions south of FSB Bravo and began moving east. When informed by a prisoner that two PAVN regiments waited in ambush ahead, the commander of the brigade, Colonel Nguyễn Trọng Luật, notified Đống of the situation. The Airborne commander landed forces and cleared the road, but never bothered to inform Luat. In order to avoid destruction on Route 9, Luat then ordered the column to abandon the road 5 miles (8.0 km) from the South Vietnamese border and plunged onto a jungle trail looking for an unguarded way back. The trail came to a dead end at the steep banks of the Sepon River and the force was trapped. Two bulldozers were finally helilifted into the ARVN perimeter to create a ford. A FAC sighted an estimated 20 PAVN armored vehicles closing in on the crossing site and called in airstrikes. The lead tank was destroyed but one USAF F-100 was shot down, two more tanks were destroyed by airstrikes and then artillery fire was used to break up the PAVN armored column. The armored-Airborne column crossed into South Vietnam on 23 March.

On 22 March the 147th Marine Brigade at FSB Delta were still enduring fierce fighting with diminishing resources. PAVN troops had penetrated the base perimeter and late in the afternoon launched an assault supported by ten flame-throwing tanks. The Marines destroyed two tanks with M72 LAW rockets, a third was destroyed by mines and fourth by an airstrike. The Marines then abandoned Delta and withdrew towards the 258th Marine Brigade positions at FSB Hotel, however the PAVN intercepted the 147th Marines and a pitched battle ensued. The 147th Marines then successfully disengaged and by the morning of 23 March had arrived at FSB Hotel. They evacuated 230 wounded marines, and by nightfall the entire 147th Marine Brigade was evacuated by U.S. helicopters to Khe Sanh. There were 37 marines missing in the action, while PAVN casualties were assessed to be heavy.

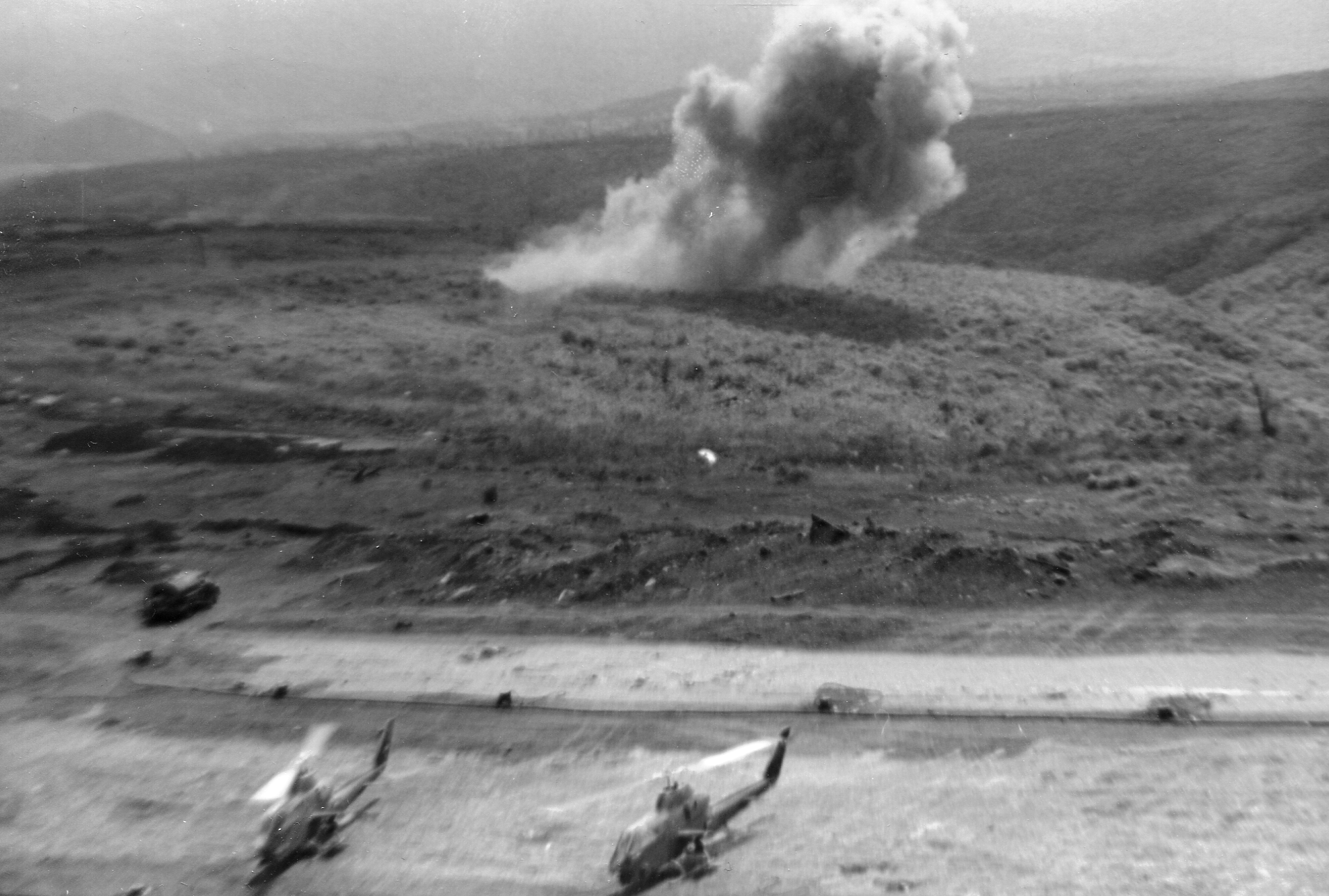
Mortar impacts near two AH-1G Cobra helicopters from HMLA-367, Khe Sanh Combat Base

At midday on 23 March the last ARVN units had crossed the border and reached the forward positions of U.S. units in South Vietnam. Due to the PAVN armored threat the U.S. 1st Battalion, 77th Armor Regiment was moved to the border to engage any PAVN tanks. During the day U.S. air support included 756 helicopter gunship sorties, 238 tactical airstrikes and 11 B-52 strikes. On the morning of 24 March U.S. air cavalry sighted PAVN armored vehicles at five different locations near Route 9 on the Laotian side of the border. Helicopter gunships and tactical airstrikes destroyed ten tanks. At FSB Hotel the PAVN began probing the perimeter and Khang ordered its withdrawal rather than repeat the fighting at FSB Delta. That afternoon U.S. helicopters extracted the 258th Marine Brigade and all of their artillery which were redeployed to Lang Vei to establish a firebase covering the border area.

On the night of 23 March, a PAVN sapper attack on Khe Sanh resulted in three Americans killed and several aircraft and two ammunition dumps destroyed, PAVN losses were 14 killed and one captured. By the 25th, 45 days after the beginning of the operation, the remainder of the South Vietnamese force that had survived had left Laos. The forward base at Khe Sanh had also come under increasing artillery bombardment and, by 6 April, it was abandoned and Operation Lam Son 719 was over.

== Aftermath ==
The operation was supposed to disrupt PAVN Base Area 604 near Tchepone and Base Area 611 near Mung Nong, however the operation had only touched the northern boundary of Base Area 611 before being prematurely terminated. In order to save face, the ARVN planned a series of raids into Base Area 611. On the morning of 31 March B-52 strikes and tactical airstrikes were conducted against an area of the Laotian Salient and at 11:30 the Hac Bao Reconnaissance Company supported by the 2nd Squadron, 17th Air Cavalry was landed in the area. The Hac Bao found 85 PAVN dead and 18 destroyed weapons. That night vehicles were heard moving to the south and a FAC called in airstrikes destroying five vehicles. On the morning of 1 April the Hac Bao found a destroyed fuel dump and tunnel complex housing armored vehicles. The Hac Bao were extracted on the afternoon of 2 April. On 6 April the Hac Bao conducted a further raid into the Laotian Salient finding 15 PAVN dead and a destroyed tunnel complex, during the operation USAF airstrikes destroyed three anti-aircraft gun positions.

During a 7 April televised speech, Nixon claimed that "Tonight I can report that Vietnamization has succeeded." and announced the withdrawal of a further 100,000 troops from South Vietnam between May and November 1971. At Đông Hà, South Vietnam, Thiệu addressed the survivors of the incursion and claimed that the operation in Laos was "the biggest victory ever." Although Lam Son 719 had set back North Vietnamese logistical operations in southeastern Laos, truck traffic on the trail system increased immediately after the conclusion of the operation. Truck sightings in the Route 9 area reached 2,500 per month post the offensive, numbers usually seen only during peak periods. The American command's claims of success were more limited in scope: MACV claimed that 108 PAVN tanks had been destroyed during the operation (74 by tactical airstrikes), plus 670 anti-aircraft guns and 600 trucks. It also fully understood that the operation had exposed grave deficiencies in South Vietnamese "planning, organization, leadership, motivation and operational expertise." In general, most of the military continued to believe that the incursion had harmed the North Vietnamese, that the South Vietnamese had fought well, and that the failure of Thiệu to reinforce the attack with another division had made all the difference. Thiệu was re-elected unopposed on 2 October 1971.

One of Kissinger's staff experts, Commander Jonathan Howe, did an extensive survey of all the messages, telephone conversations, and memorandums on the subject that had passed between the White House and the various agencies responsible for the operation. He reported that the assurances Nixon had received from all quarters, even from Abrams, had rarely corresponded with what was actually happening in the field. Instead, from the perspective of the White House, the South Vietnamese had failed to give their American advisers an adequate picture of what was occurring. Meanwhile, Abrams had been "slow in reporting, in taking the initiative to correct the situation, and in grasping initially the importance of keeping Washington informed of developments.” As a result, administration spokesmen had again and again taken positions contrary to subsequent events in the field." Kissinger took up his misgivings with the president. According to Nixon's chief of staff, H. R. Haldeman, both decided they had been misled by Abrams in the original evaluation of what the operation might accomplish and that they should have followed Westmoreland's advice to cut off the Ho Chi Minh Trail to the south rather than drive toward Tchepone. The town had been "a visible objective" but the attempt to take it had turned out to be "basically a disaster." Nixon and Kissinger concluded, Haldeman noted, "that they should pull Abrams out, but then the President made the point that this is the end of the military operations anyway so what difference does it make." Dissatisfied with Abrams' performance during the operation, Nixon eventually made the decision to replace him in May 1972 during the Easter Offensive.

For the North Vietnamese, the "Route 9 – Southern Laos Victory", was viewed as a complete success. The PAVN claimed to have eliminated 20,000 enemy, destroyed 1,100 vehicles (including 528 tanks and APCs) and more than 100 artillery pieces, shot down 505 helicopters and captured over 1,000 prisoners, 3,000 weapons, six tanks and APCs and large quantities of radios, ammunition and other equipment. The military expansion of the Ho Chi Minh Trail to the west which had begun in 1970 at the expense of Laotian forces, was quickly accelerated. Laotian troops were soon withdrawing toward the Mekong River and a logistical artery 60 miles (97 km) in width was soon expanded to 90 miles (140 km). Another result of the operation was a firm decision by the Politburo to launch a major conventional invasion of South Vietnam in early 1972, paving the way for the Easter Offensive.

U.S. planners had believed that any North Vietnamese forces that opposed the incursion would be caught in the open and decimated by the application of American aerial might, either in the form of tactical airstrikes or airmobility, which would provide ARVN troops with superior battlefield maneuvering capability. Firepower, as it turned out, was decisive, but "it went in favor of the enemy... Airpower played an important, but not decisive role, in that it prevented a defeat from becoming a disaster that might have been so complete as to encourage the North Vietnamese army to keep moving right into Quang Tri Province."

The number of helicopters destroyed or damaged during the operation shocked the proponents of U.S. Army aviation and prompted a reevaluation of basic airmobile doctrine. The 101st Airborne Division alone, for example, had 84 of its aircraft destroyed and another 430 damaged. During the operation American helicopters had flown more than 160,000 sorties and 19 U.S. Army aviators had been killed, 59 were wounded and 11 were missing at its conclusion. South Vietnamese helicopters had flown an additional 5,500 missions. U.S. Air Force tactical aircraft had flown more than 8,000 sorties during the incursion and had dropped 20,000 tons of bombs and napalm. B-52 bombers had flown another 1,358 sorties and dropped 32,000 tons of ordnance. Seven U.S. fixed-wing aircraft were shot down over southern Laos: six from the Air Force (two dead/two missing) and one from the Navy (one aviator killed).

In total, the U.S Army lost 108 helicopters destroyed (10 OH-6A, 6 OH-58, 53 UH-1H, 26 AH-1G, 3 CH-47 and 2 CH-53) and another 618 damaged (25 OH-6A, 15 OH-58, 316 UH-1H, 158 AH-1G, 26 CH-47, 13 CH-53 and 2 CH-54). 20 percent of these helicopter damaged were so badly damaged that they were not expected to fly again. This figure excludes ARVN helicopters lost.

== Media coverage ==
MACV established a press camp at Quảng Trị and the ARVN also set up a press center nearby. However MACV had no intention of giving Saigon based correspondents the true story of the battle or allowing reporters to cross into Laos. MACV refused to allow correspondents onboard U.S. military helicopters operating over Laos. Following the deaths of correspondents travelling on an RVNAF helicopter on 10 February, the RVNAF transported two groups of correspondents into Laos on 13 and 16 February, while ten travelled overland along Route 9. Due to the limited information available about the operation the press developed their own leads producing stories that were at times unreliable. Where the Nixon administration had sought to depict the operation as a strictly limited attempt to buy time for Vietnamization, many reporters had come to believe just the opposite, that the president intended to expand the war. MACV public affairs officers deferred to the South Vietnamese to provide details of operations in Laos in order to reinforce the impression that the U.S. sought to convey that this was a South Vietnamese operation conducted for their own defense.

State Department news analysts observed on 9 February that a majority of news media outlets around the country appeared to accept the validity of U.S. actions in Laos, even though many criticized the public affairs policies that continued to muddle the issue and many questioned the long-term implications of the move.

During the fight for Ranger North, as late as 21 February South Vietnamese military briefers stated that 23 Rangers had been killed compared to 639 PAVN dead. Reporters nevertheless learned some details by interviewing survivors, returning helicopter pilots and the American officers stationed at the border who kept in close touch by radio with the units in the field. They combined that information with what they received from official South Vietnamese sources, concluded that the South Vietnamese had suffered a defeat and put the word on the wire. On 22 February a story in The New York Times titled "Saigon's Rangers driven from an outpost in Laos" depicted the fight at Ranger North as a panicked debacle for the ARVN with able-bodied Rangers pushing their way onto medevac helicopters.

On 20 February in an effort to improve relations with the media MACV allowed correspondents onto U.S. fixed wing aircraft supporting the operation and on 25 February provided a dedicated helicopter to transport correspondents into Laos. However, despite these efforts by 24 February media coverage turned increasingly pessimistic with reports of the attack on FSB 31 and its subsequent loss raising doubts about the ability of the South Vietnamese to mount such an operation and what its objectives were. Reporters based at Khe Sanh filed regular reports noting mounting U.S. helicopter losses and returning helicopters filled with South Vietnamese dead and wounded. By 18 March all three of the television networks in the United States were reporting that South Vietnamese forces were retreating from Laos and that helicopter pilots had confirmed the serious damage many units had sustained. Newsweek magazine's 15 March 1971 cover story was titled "The Helicopter War" and described U.S. helicopter operations over Laos.

On 21 March, at a special briefing for Saigon correspondents, Abrams stressed the gains the South Vietnamese had achieved and denied that any sort of catastrophe had occurred. Continuing to concentrate on the large quantities of supplies destroyed, on kill ratios of ten to one, and on the loss by the PAVN of 13 out of 33 maneuver battalions, he conceded in response to hard questioning that the PAVN had routed the 2nd Airborne Battalion at FSB 30, whose own commander had deserted his men. Yet the members of the more successful units, he said, would emerge from Laos with confidence higher than they had ever possessed. Countering these assertions on 23 March NBC News reported the evacuation of an ARVN regiment on Route 9 where soldiers clung to the skids of helicopters rather than waiting for more helicopters that might not come. Moreover, there were claims that "American crews coated the skids with grease so the South Vietnamese would stop hanging on in numbers sufficient to bring down the choppers". That same evening Nixon was interviewed on ABC News, he cautioned that it was too soon to judge whether the incursion was a success or a failure, but still stressed that the raid had made considerable progress toward ensuring the continuation of American withdrawals and reducing the threat to the American forces that remained in Southeast Asia. He went on to emphasize that the impression of panic conveyed by television news films was inaccurate. "What have the pictures shown?" he said. "They've shown only those men in the four ARVN battalions... that were in trouble. They haven't shown people in the other 18 battalions. That is not because it's been deliberate. It's because those make news."

The media views on the results of the operation were mixed, some accepted the Nixon Administration's claims that it was too early to tell what the effect had been, others concluded that it was a South Vietnamese defeat that had shown that the North Vietnamese remained determined to keep fighting.
