= Max Thomas (cricketer) =

Australian cricketer

Personal information
- Full name: Maxwell Raymond Thomas
- Born: 28 June 1921; Launceston, Tasmania, Australia
- Died: 20 May 2001 (aged 79); Lenah Valley, Hobart, Australia
- Batting: Left-handed
- Bowling: Right-arm off-break, right-arm medium pace
- Relatives: Ronald Thomas (brother)

Domestic team information
- Years: Team
- 1945/46–1956/57: Tasmania

Career statistics
Competition	First-class
Matches	19
Runs scored	955
Batting average	28.08
100s/50s	2/3
Top score	164
Balls bowled	242
Wickets	7
Bowling average	23.42
5 wickets in innings	1
10 wickets in match	0
Best bowling	5/54
Catches/stumpings	8/–
- Source: Cricinfo, 28 September 2025

Maxwell Raymond Thomas (28 June 1921 – 20 May 2001) was an Australian cricketer. He played 19 first-class matches for Tasmania between 1945 and 1957.

A "careful and deliberate" opening or number three batsman, Thomas scored a century on his first-class debut in January 1946, finishing on 164 in Tasmania's first innings against the Australian Services XI. He was the first Tasmanian to score a century on first-class debut. In two matches against Victoria in the 1953–54 season, he scored 136 in 368 minutes in Hobart, and 86 in 233 minutes in Launceston.

Thomas worked as a teacher of manual arts in secondary schools, at first in Launceston before moving in the late 1950s to Hobart. He took up umpiring in Hobart, and went on to umpire five first-class matches in Tasmania between 1966 and 1971.
