= Elisabeth Friske =

First female West German airline pilot

- Friske in 1971 on the day of the crash of Paninternational Flight 112.
- Born: 1939/1940
- Died: 31 May 1987 (aged 47); Lübeck, West Germany
- Cause of death: Aviation accident
- Occupation: Pilot
- Spouse: Gerd Friske
- Children: Erhard Friske

Elisabeth Friske (1939/1940 – 31 May 1987) was a West German commercial airline pilot. She was the first female commercial airline pilot in West Germany, and one of the first women to fly commercially anywhere in the Western Hemisphere.

== Career ==
Elisabeth Friske obtained her pilot's license with the financial help of her husband, Gerd Friske, and gained practice flight hours by shuttling parachutists. By the time she was 27, she had obtained the requisite qualifications to be accepted by an airline for final training and work as a commercial airline pilot. She hoped to fly for German airline Lufthansa, but struggled to find work with Lufthansa and other major airlines due to being a woman. In rejecting her application, Lufthansa stated: "The burden of flying a plane on regular services is too heavy and difficult for a woman." Commercial airlines also refused to pay for her to obtain an instrument rating, a requirement for piloting commercial airline flights, which was a standard practice at the time. Friske would eventually find work with startup West German airline Paninternational.

=== Crash of Paninternational Flight 112 ===
Friske was the first officer on Paninternational Flight 112 on September 6, 1971. Due to a maintenance error, kerosene was sprayed into the water cooled engines of the BAC One-Eleven instead of water shortly after takeoff from Hamburg Airport, causing the engines to catch fire. Friske, Captain Reinhold Hüls, and third pilot Manfred Rhode made an emergency landing on the nearby Bundesautobahn 7. The pilots chose to land on the south-bound lane, opposite the flow of traffic, to avoid the heavy traffic on the north-bound lane out of Hamburg. During the landing, the plane struck a concrete overpass and its pillars, causing the plane to break apart. 22 of the 121 people on board died in the crash. Friske, Hüls and Rhode were injured—Friske's left leg was broken—but all survived. Rescuers described Friske as being in a state of shock, refusing to leave the destroyed cabin of the aircraft without her shoes. One firefighter claimed to have had to slap her in the face to get her to leave the burning wreckage.

In the aftermath of the accident, Paninternational ceased operations, and Friske struggled to find further commercial airline work. Despite the cause of the disaster being unrelated to pilot error, many early news reports pointed to a woman in the cockpit as a factor in the crash, labeling her the "Catastrophe Woman in the Cockpit," (Note: German: „Katastrophen-Frau im Cockpit“.) an image that followed her the rest of her career. She was unemployed for years before finding work piloting private charter flights with the Düsseldorf-based company Travel Air.

== Death ==
On 31 May 1987, Friske was the co-pilot on a private Travel Air flight for German politician Uwe Barschel, then the Minister-President of Schleswig-Holstein, flying a Cessna 501 Citation alongside pilot Michael Heise. On approach to Lübeck-Blankensee Airport, the Cessna flew below the approach floor and struck an antenna. Friske was killed in the ensuing crash. Of the two crew and two passengers on the plane, Barschel was the only survivor, although he himself died of a drug overdose a little over four months later.

== Personal life ==
Friske was married to businessman and parachutist Gerd Friske, with whom she had a son, Erhard.

== See also ==
- Turi Widerøe
- Rosella Bjornson
- Yvonne Pope Sintes
