= Jim Taylor (footballer, born 1907) =

Australian rules footballer, born 1907

Personal information
- Full name: John James Taylor
- Born: 2 February 1907; Wycheproof, Victoria
- Died: 5 May 1987 (aged 80); Bendigo, Victoria
- Original team: Quambatook
- Height: 187 cm (6 ft 2 in)
- Weight: 87 kg (192 lb)

Playing career^{1}
Years	Club	Games (Goals)
1929	St Kilda	2 (0)
- ^{1} Playing statistics correct to the end of 1929.

John James Taylor (2 February 1907 – 5 May 1987) was an Australian rules footballer who played with St Kilda in the Victorian Football League (VFL).
