= Paninternational =

West German airline

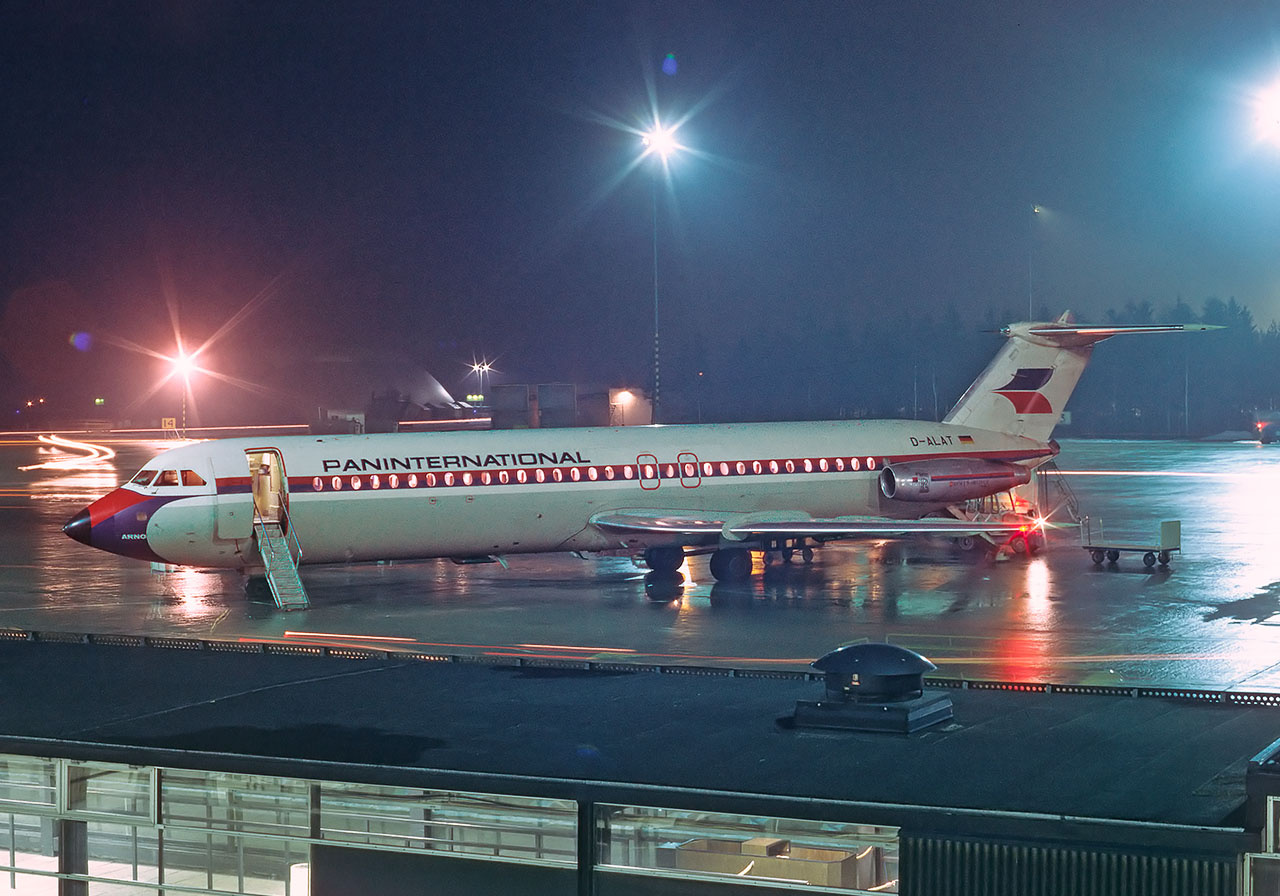
- BAC One-Eleven parked at Stockholm Arlanda Airport in 1971
IATA	ICAO	Call sign
DR	-	DELTA ROMEO
- Founded: 1969 as Panair
- Commenced operations: 15 June 1969 as Panair
- Ceased operations: 6 October 1971 as Paninternational
- Operating bases: Düsseldorf Airport; Munich-Riem Airport
- Fleet size: 6
- Parent company: Paneuropa
- Headquarters: Munich, West Germany

Paninternational was a West German leisure airline headquartered in Munich with bases at Munich-Riem Airport and Düsseldorf Airport.

== History ==
The airline was established as Germania Fluganlage GmbH in early 1969 but quickly changed its corporate name to Panair. It was the flying arm of Munich-based tour operator Paneuropa and started operations on 15 June of that same year with brand new BAC 1-11-515FB jetliners with a 109-seat single-class configuration. The favorite destinations were those of the Mediterranean basin and the Canary Islands.

On 1 January 1970, the corporate name was changed to Paninternational and two more BAC 1-11s were ordered. In November it also acquired two second-hand Boeing 707-120B to expand into long-haul markets, but these programs were not crowned with success.

The company's reputation was damaged by a nasty accident on September 6, 1971, when a BAC 1-11 crash-landed on a highway shortly after takeoff from Hamburg Airport. The accident gained large media attention and negative publicity. Exactly one month later, on 6 October, the airline ceased operations.

== Fleet ==
Paninternational operated the following aircraft:

Aircraft type	Total	Introduced	Retired	Remarks
Boeing 707-120B	2	1970	1971	
BAC 1-11-515FB	4	1969	1971	One written off as Flight 112
Sud Aviation Caravelle III	1	1969	1969	Leased from Trans-Union

== Accident ==
- Paninternational Flight 112: On September 6, 1971, a BAC 1-11-515FB (registered D-ALAR) was lost when it crash-landed on a highway shortly after takeoff from Hamburg Airport on its way to Málaga. 22 passengers and crew were killed in the incident, caused by an unintentional filling of the aircraft's engine water injection system with jet fuel, which led to a failure of both engines.

== See also ==
- List of defunct airlines of Germany
