= James W. Sutherland =

American general (1918–1987)

James William Sutherland
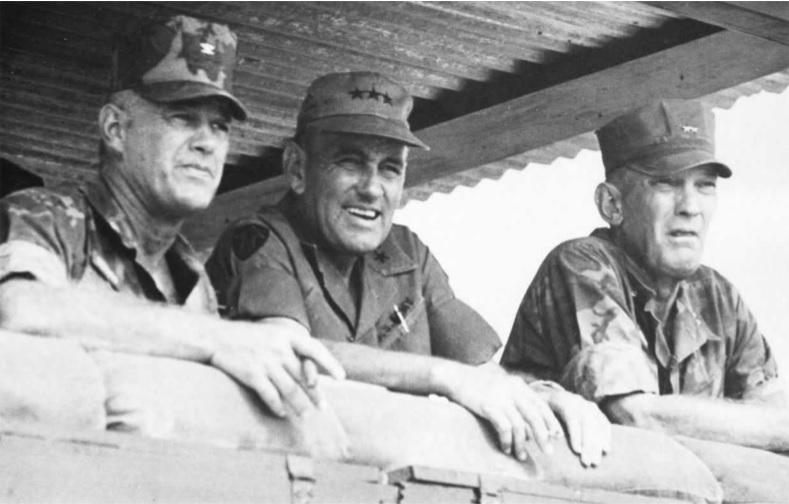
- LTG Sutherland (center), 1970
- Born: February 8, 1918; Benton County, Arkansas
- Died: May 1, 1987 (aged 69); Beaufort, South Carolina
- Burial place: Arlington National Cemetery
- Military career
- Allegiance: United States
- Branch: United States Army
- Service years: 1941–1971
- Rank: Lieutenant General
- Nickname: Jock
- Commands: XXIV Corps
- Conflicts: Vietnam War
- Awards: Distinguished Service Medal

James William Sutherland (1918–1987) was a United States Army Lieutenant General, who served as commander of XXIV Corps during the Vietnam War.

== Early life and education ==
Sutherland was born on 8 February 1918 in Benton County, Arkansas.

== Military service ==
=== Post WWII ===
MG Sutherland served as commander of the US Army Test and Evaluation Command at Aberdeen Proving Ground from August 1963 to December 1965.

=== Vietnam War ===
Sutherland served as commander of XXIV Corps from 18 June 1970 until 9 June 1971. During this time he was involved in the planning and support of Operation Lam Son 719. On 25 March 1971 Sutherland advised COMUSMACV General Creighton Abrams ". .. As you have stated before we can take [the South Vietnamese] . . . only so far; beyond that point they must go on their own. We have reached that point in Lam Son 719. Today I am not sure of how much further we can take them."

=== Post Vietnam ===
Sutherland served as Chief of Staff United States European Command from 1971.

He died on 1 May 1987 in Beaufort, South Carolina, and was buried at Arlington National Cemetery.
