= Godfrey Surman =

English cricketer

Personal information
- Full name: Godfrey Pearce Surman
- Born: 18 July 1914; Uckington, Gloucestershire, England
- Died: 29 May 1987 (aged 72); Southampton, Hampshire, England
- Batting: Right-handed
- Role: Bowler

Domestic team information
- Years: Team
- 1936–1937: Gloucestershire

Career statistics
Competition	FC
Matches	2
Runs scored	11
Batting average
100s/50s
Top score
Balls bowled
Wickets	2
Bowling average
5 wickets in innings
10 wickets in match
Best bowling
Catches/stumpings
- Source: Cricinfo, 3 August 2013

Godfrey Surman (18 July 1914 – 29 May 1987) was an English cricketer. He played for Gloucestershire between 1936 and 1937.
