= John Denys Taylor =

British medical missionary

- Born: 3 September 1908; Manchester, Lancashire, England
- Died: 4 May 1987 (aged 78); Harare, Mashonaland East, Zimbabwe
- Citizenship: English
- Education: Theological College at Westminster
- Known for: Created the Bonda Mission Hospital and the S.R.N.
- Spouse: Elsa Moira Hedges
- Children: 6
- Medical career
- Profession: Priest, doctor
- Institutions: Bonda Mission Hospital, Church of England

John Denys Taylor (3 September 1908 – 4 May 1987) was a Christian medical missionary who founded Bonda Mission Hospital within the Nyanga district in Zimbabwe.

== Early life and education ==
Taylor was born on 3 September 1908 in Manchester, England, to Isaac and Edith Taylor. In 1935, he married Elsa Moira Hedges (born in 1912), in Fylde, Lancashire.

Taylor was trained at Warminster Theological College from 1938 to 1940.

== Career ==
Taylor, with his family, were members of the Church of England. Taylor wished to become a missionary doctor and in 1937, Bishop Paget gave him the opportunity to begin his journey to Bonda in the Inyanga district where he became a reverend recognized by the Church of England. The first medical work hospital was founded through the Church of England at St. David’s Mission with the grant from the Society for the Propagation of the Gospel in Foreign Parts.

"We had a trickle of in-patients from the start, but these were mostly unimportant relatives sent in to see what happened to them! When these were found to survive we began to get genuine cases. The foundation of my medical reputation was built mainly on four simple remedies which in these complicated days one is now apt to underestimate. They were Mist, Ammon Chloe Co for the chest, Mist. Alba for the abdomen, Ung. Sulphur and Ung. Had. Ammon Dil for the skin (scabies being then almost universal among the children). These four at least answered the first criterion of treatment in that they never made the patient worse!"

— John Denys Taylor

The Society for the Propagation of the Gospel in Foreign Parts (SPG) missionaries came to Southern Rhodesia in 1821 with the first mission in St. Augustine’s Mission. The Beit Trust funded medical work at Bonda Mission, "St. David's Mission", in 1928 with one nurse, Miss L Adlam, a retired matron who worked at the Salisbury Hospital. This was the first medical work that was accomplished in Southern Rhodesia; however, it was closed due to lack of staffing in 1931 and the original building was built by the Society for the Propagation of the Gospel in Foreign Parts.

The hospital was reopened in 1937 and Taylor became its first physician; Sister Lorna Page joined shortly after. Its goal was to create a connection between “God’s glory” and mental and physical health. Originally, the hospital consisted of one main block with two subsequent wards and three relatively small rooms that included the operating theater and three huts used for outpatient treatment and a dispensary for contaminated items.

Within the first five months of Taylor’s arrival, over 200 patients were treated in the outpatient setting. With the shortage of drugs, supplies and trained professionals, many relatives were forced to become anesthetists or took on other roles, which was only short lived. In particular, mothers would die as there was no access to Cesarean sections or blood transfusions, which eventually became a priority for the hospital. The Bonda Mission Hospital also became the inspiration for St Faith's School, Rusape.

In 1947 Bishop Balya visited Taylor at Bonda. By this time, 20 women had begun their nursing training. The Bonda Mission Hospital, in addition to the C.M.S. Hospital in Kampala, was used as the model for St. Francis’ hospital to bring a connection between religious faith and medicine in Africa.

As the medical superintendent, Taylor and Sister Lorna Page’s religious beliefs were able to be implemented into the practices of the hospital with it being a location of medical treatment and a place of worship.

=== Expansion of the hospital ===
Throughout Taylor's leadership, there was an expansion of the physical hospital space and the staff which was supported by subscriptions from Taylor's friends and family in England. This expansion allowed for the children’s ward and a surgical block to be completed and equipped with the necessary equipment. In addition, the outpatient areas were expanded and a separate maternity ward was built. After 1945, the Beit Trust sponsored more buildings, along with some funding from the Government and a donation from Canon Broderick.

"Surgery started the hard way, for one without any surgical experience, with very large 'fibroids'- usually well above the umbilicus- very large goiters and a few caesarian sections. I had to start with these because nothing more simple would offer. The simplest were the caesarians, for which permission was never refused. The others often needed very long consultations with many relatives before permission could be obtained."

— John Taylor

New premises led to more surgeries, with Cesarean deliveries and I.V. transfusions being introduced.

In 1951, pulmonary tuberculosis became a health concern as cases increased with a shortage of beds due to the high demand. The Beit Trust, with the government, funded the creation of a 45 bed block for tuberculosis patients with an X-ray unit and a diesel electric power unit in 1952.

With the 1951 expansion of the hospital, the original verandah was repurposed as the hospital chapel. The chapel was an important location as the center of the hospital to allow for the connection with God’s glory and the establishment of spiritual health with both mental and physical health.

Throughout Taylor’s 40 years at the missionary, Bonda Hospital was able to expand to a full size of 200 beds and over 100 staff members.

By 2017, the hospital was reported to be in a dilapidated state, with much work needed to bring it up to a useable standard.

=== Death ===
Taylor died on 4 May 1987, near the Bonda Region in Harare, Mashonaland East, Zimbabwe.

== Legacy ==
Taylor developed the Bonda Mission Hospital as well as a nursing education program. In 1962, the Birmingham Medical School sent a delegation to Nyanga with the intent to establish the Salisbury Medical School.

Under Taylor's leadership, the "New Look" was established for missions in 1959 through both foundation and government funding. At the time, nursing and orderly staff at the mission with Taylor received approximately half of the Government starting salaries for similar posts, which teaching staff at mission hospitals received equal pay to government teaching staff. This prompted the “best school students” to go into the field of teaching rather than into mission practice.

The New Look recognized the necessary adjustment towards equitable salaries for those in mission work, especially those funded by an English establishment, including the Church of England. In addition to salaries, grants and donations at the "New Look" time were placed towards building new living quarters for the nursing staff and training through the (State Registered Nurses) S.R.N. The S.R.N. was originally the goal of the education program and establishment of the Bonda Mission Hospital.

After his death, the Bonda Mission Hospital expanded to found the Bonda Mission Hospital School of Nursing.

His four sons and one daughter were born at Bonda Mission Hospital and were delivered by him.
