= Emőke Énekes-Szegedi =

Hungarian volleyball player (1948–1987)

Personal information
- Nationality: Hungarian
- Born: 1 January 1948; Dunasziget, Hungary
- Died: 20 May 1987 (aged 39); Budapest, Hungary

Sport
- Sport: Volleyball

Emőke Énekes-Szegedi (1 January 1948 – 20 May 1987) was a Hungarian volleyball player. She competed at the 1972 Summer Olympics and the 1980 Summer Olympics.
