= Hilton Curran =

Australian rugby league footballer and administrator

Personal information
- Full name: Hilton Matthew Curran
- Born: 15 November 1914 Adelong, New South Wales
- Died: 31 May 1987 (aged 72) Maroubra, New South Wales

Playing information
- Position: Wing
Club
Years	Team	Pld	T	G	FG	P
1938	St. George	4	2	0	0	6

Hilton Curran (15 November 1914 – 31 May 1987) was an Australian rugby league footballer who played in the 1930s.

Curran came to the St. George club via the Tumut rugby league football club.

A talented winger with a turn of speed, Curran stayed one season with the Saints in 1938. He later served in Australian in the Army during World War Two.

Curran died at Maroubra, New South Wales, on 31 May 1987.
