= Ron Frederickson =

Australian rugby league footballer

- Ron Frederickson.1938

Personal information
- Full name: Ronald Herbert Frederickson
- Born: 22 October 1918; Kogarah, New South Wales, Australia
- Died: 21 May 1987 (aged 68); Campbelltown, New South Wales, Australia

Playing information
- Position: Five-eighth
Club
Years	Team	Pld	T	G	FG	P
1936–40	St. George	42	5	0	0	15

Ronald Herbert Frederickson (22 October 1918 – 21 May 1987) was an Australian rugby league footballer who played in the 1930s and 1940s.

== Career ==
Frederickson was graded from the Barton United RLFC in 1935 and reached First Grade the following year. A five-eighth with great skills, Frederickson had many fine seasons at St. George although he suffered many bad injuries and broken bones during his career. He retired at the end of 1940 due to his enlistment in the Australian Army in World War II.

== War service ==
After joining the AIF in 1941, he served until his discharge in 1944 and then joined the RAAF as a Leading Aircraftman until the end of the war.

== Death ==
Frederickson died on 21 May 1987 in Campbelltown, New South Wales aged 68.
