= Ronald Thomas (cricketer) =

Australian cricketer

Personal information
- Born: 21 September 1915; Longford, Tasmania, Australia
- Died: 28 May 1987 (aged 71); Launceston, Tasmania, Australia
- Relatives: Max Thomas (brother)

Domestic team information
- Years: Team
- 1933-1951: Tasmania
- Source: Cricinfo, 6 March 2016

Ronald Thomas (21 September 1915 – 28 May 1987) was an Australian cricketer. He played 26 first-class matches for Tasmania between 1933 and 1951.

== See also ==
- List of Tasmanian representative cricketers
