= Pierre Litoux =

French politician

Pierre Litoux (7 July 1902 – 12 May 1987) was a French politician.

Litoux was born on 7 July 1902 in Saint-Lyphard. He served as mayor of his hometown from May 1929 to March 1978. He was affiliated with the Union for the New Republic and represented Loire-Atlantique's 7th constituency in the National Assembly from 1962 to 1968. He died in Saint-Lyphard on 12 May 1987.
