= List of Finnish painters =

An list of notable painters from Finland:

== A ==
- Ilmari Aalto (1891–1934)
- Fredrik Ahlstedt (1839–1901)
- Immanuel Alm (1767–1809), painter primarily of altarpieces
- Johan Alm (1728–1810), painter of primarily religious-themed works
- Tor Arne (born 1934)
- Helena Arnell (1697–1751), one of the first Finnish painters, and one of the few female artists

== B ==
- Johan Backman (1706–1768)
- Adolf von Becker (1831–1909)
- Carl Bengts (1876–1934)
- Jonas Bergman (1724–1810)
- Gunnar Berndtson (1854–1895)
- Edla Blommér (1817–1908)
- Elias Brenner (1647–1717)

== C ==
- Margareta Capsia (1682–1759), first professional native female painter in Finland
- Birger Carlstedt (1907–1975)
- Alvar Cawén (1886–1935)
- Fanny Churberg (1845–1892)
- Marcus Collin (1882–1966)

== D ==
- Elin Danielson-Gambogi (1861–1919)

== E ==
- Albert Edelfelt (1854–1905)
- Robert Wilhelm Ekman (1808–1873), teacher and painter of the Finnish romantic portraits
- Samuel Elmgren (1771–1834)
- Magnus Enckell (1870–1925)
- Cris af Enehielm (born 1954)

== F ==
- Mauri Favén (1920–2006)
- Gustaf Wilhelm Finnberg (1784–1833)
- Hanna Frosterus-Segerstråle (1867–1946)
- Alexandra Frosterus-Såltin (1837–1916)

== G ==
- Lars Gallenius (1658–1753)
- Akseli Gallen-Kallela (1865–1931)
- Jorma Gallen-Kallela (1898–1939)
- Johan Georg Geitel (1683–1771)
- Berndt Godenhjelm (1799–1881)
- Emanuel Granberg (1754–1797)
- Alvar Gullichsen (born 1961)

== H ==
- Pekka Halonen (1865–1933)
- Ilona Harima (1911–1986)
- Johan Erik Hedberg (1767–1823)
- Gustaf Erik Hedman (1777–1841)
- Jonas Heiska (1873–1937)
- Werner Holmberg (1830–1860)

== I ==
- Edvard Isto (1865–1905)

== J ==
- Fritz Jakobsson (born 1940), portraitist
- Karl Emanuel Jansson (1846–1874)
- Tove Jansson (1914–2001), Swedish-Finnish novelist, painter, and comic strip author
- Eero Järnefelt (1863–1937)

== K ==
- Rudolf Koivu (1890–1946), painter best known for illustrating books of fairytales for children
- Väinö Kunnas (1896–1929)
- Sinikka Kurkinen (born 1935)

== L ==
- Vilho Lampi (1898–1936)
- Claes Lang (1690–1761)
- Aleksander Lauréus (1783–1823)
- Kuutti Lavonen (born 1960)
- Nikolai Lehto (1905–1994)
- Armas Lindgren (1874–1929), architect, professor and painter
- Johan Erik Lindh (1793–1865)
- Berndt Lindholm (1841–1914)
- Erik Johan Löfgren (1825–1884)
- Sirkka-Liisa Lonka (born 1943)
- Gustaf Lucander (1724–1805)
- Amélie Lundahl (1850–1914)
- Leena Luostarinen (1949–2013)

== M ==
- Charlotta Malm-Reuterholm (1768–1845), Finnish-Swedish artist, painter, writer and noble
- Totte Mannes (born 1933)
- Jaakko Mattila (born 1976)
- Bruno Maximus (born 1970)
- Nándor Mikola (1911–2006), watercolor painter
- Timo K. Mukka (1944–1973)
- Hjalmar Munsterhjelm (1840–1905)
- Helvi Mustonen (born 1947)
- Abraham Myra (1639–1684)
- Lars Myra (died 1712)
- Didrik Möllerum (1642–1702)

== N ==
- Jochim Neiman (1600–1673)
- Eero Nelimarkka (1891–1977)
- Johannes Nevala (born 1966)

== O ==
- Yrjö Ollila (1887–1932)
- Paul Osipow (born 1939)

== P ==
- Kalervo Palsa (1947–1987)

== R ==
- Mathilda Rotkirch (1813–1842)
- Jalmari Ruokokoski (1886–1936)

== S ==
- Yrjö Saarinen (1899–1958)
- Tyko Sallinen (1879–1955)
- Santeri Salokivi (1886–1940)
- Reidar Särestöniemi (1925–1981), painter from Lapland
- Sigrid Schauman (1877–1979)
- Nils Schillmark (1745–1804)
- Helene Schjerfbeck (1862–1946)
- Hugo Simberg (1873–1917)
- Anita Snellman (1924–2006)
- Eero Snellman (1890–1951)
- Venny Soldan-Brofeldt (1863–1945)
- Kaj Stenvall (born 1951)
- Johan Stålbom (1712–1777)
- Léopold Survage (1879–1968), painter of Russian-Danish-Finnish descent
- Gabriel Gotthard Sweidel (1744–1813)

== T ==
- Marjatta Tapiola (born 1951)
- Emanuel Thelning (1767–1831)
- Ellen Thesleff (1869–1954)
- Verner Thomé (1878–1953)
- Mikael Toppelius (1734–1821)
- Veikko Törmänen (born 1945)

== V ==
- Sam Vanni (1908–1992)

== W ==
- Isak Wacklin (1720–1758)
- Dora Wahlroos (1870–1947)
- Martta Wendelin (1893–1986)
- Victor Westerholm (1860–1919)
- Erik Westzynthius the Elder (1711–1757)
- Erik Westzynthius the Younger (1743–1787)
- Sigurd Wettenhovi-Aspa (1870–1946), artist and amateur egyptologist
- Maria Wiik (1853–1928)
- Ferdinand von Wright (1822–1906)
- Magnus von Wright (1805–1868), painter and ornithologist
- Wilhelm von Wright (1810–1887)
- Henry Wuorila-Stenberg (born 1949)
