= Nevala =

Nevala is a Finnish surname. Notable people with the surname include:

- Johannes Nevala (born 1966), Finnish artist
- Pauli Nevala (1940–2025), Finnish javelin thrower

== See also ==
- Alec Nevala-Lee (born 1980), American novelist, biographer and science fiction writer
