= November Group (Finland) =

Finnish art group

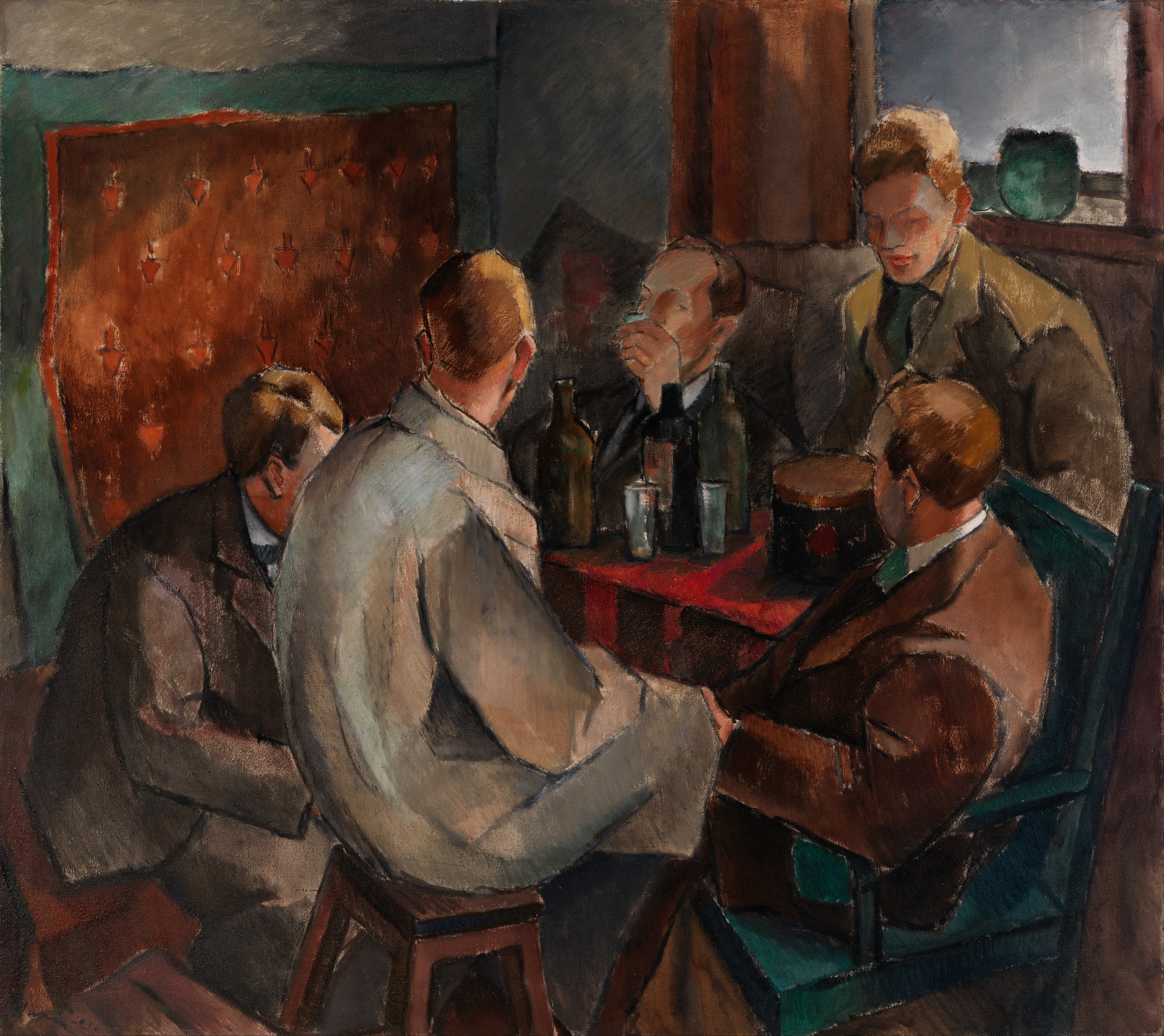
Alvar Cawén, Members of the November Group (1921) currentlocation: EMMA – Espoo Museum of Modern Art

November Group (Marraskuun ryhmä) was an association of Finnish expressionist artists, gathered around Tyko Sallinen. The group was founded in time when Finland declared its independence from Russia and the members of the November Group were sometimes aggressively nationalistic in outlook, creating a distinctively Finnish form of Expressionism. The November group caused the greatest ever uproar in Finnish art. In the Finnish art community of its age it represented everything that was ugly, incompetent, distorting and primitive. Today the movement is considered one of the most important and influenced movements in Finnish art.

Members of the group included Tyko Sallinen, Marcus Collin, Alvar Cawén, Juho Rissanen and Gabriel Engberg. These five had a group exhibition 17 November to 5 December 1917, and in decided to found a group during that exhibition. Other members of the group were Eero Nelimarkka, Juho Mäkelä, Wäinö Aaltonen, Ilmari Aalto, Hannes Autere, Kalle Carlstedt, Mikko Carlstedt, Ragnar Ekelund, Uuno Eskola, Einar Ilmoni, Karl Ingelius, Jussi Jylänki, Albin Kaasinen, Viljo Kojo, Paavo Leinonen, Anton Lindforss, Arvo Makkonen, Alex Matson, Kosti Meriläinen, Jalmari Ruokokoski, Inni Siegberg and Antti Wanninen.

The group took its name from month of its first exhibition.

Sallinen, Collin and Cawén had studied in France and were familiar with French fauvism and expressionism. However, they selected to use dark grey and brownish colours instead of the bright colours favoured by French fauvism. They also took influences of cubism and Russian cube-futurism.

Many of the future group members had met each other in Denmark already in 1910, where they stayed with taylor Niels-Peder Rydeng, who became a patron and collector of modern art.
