= Henry Wuorila-Stenberg =

Finnish painter (born 1949)

Henry John Carl Wuorila-Stenberg (born February 6, 1949) is a Finnish Swedish artist, who in many of his works has tones of expressionism and surrealism.

Wuorila-Stenberg was born in Helsinki. He began his art studies in Finland 1967–1969 in the School of the Finnish Academy of Art as a private pupil and then in the Free Art School under the guidance of Tor Arne and Unto Pusa. He continued his studies in Accademia di Belle Arti di Roma 1970-71 and moved then to West Berlin, where in 1974 he earned his academic degree in the Berlin State School of Fine Arts. In 1978 he studied anatomy in Hochschule für Bildende Künste Dresden in the class of Gottfried Bammes.

Wuorila-Stenberg has been a long-time teacher of painting. He worked in the University of Art and Design 1984-98 and in the Academy of Fine Arts in 1996-2005 first as a part-time teacher and then as a professor and the head of the department of painting.

Wuorila-Stenberg has been awarded with the Finland Prize in 1996, an honorary diploma of the World Cultural Council in 2003 and the Pro Finlandia Medal in 2004.

In 2013 he published his autobiography Hämärän näkijä (in Finnish).
