= Marcus Collin =

Finnish painter (1882–1966)

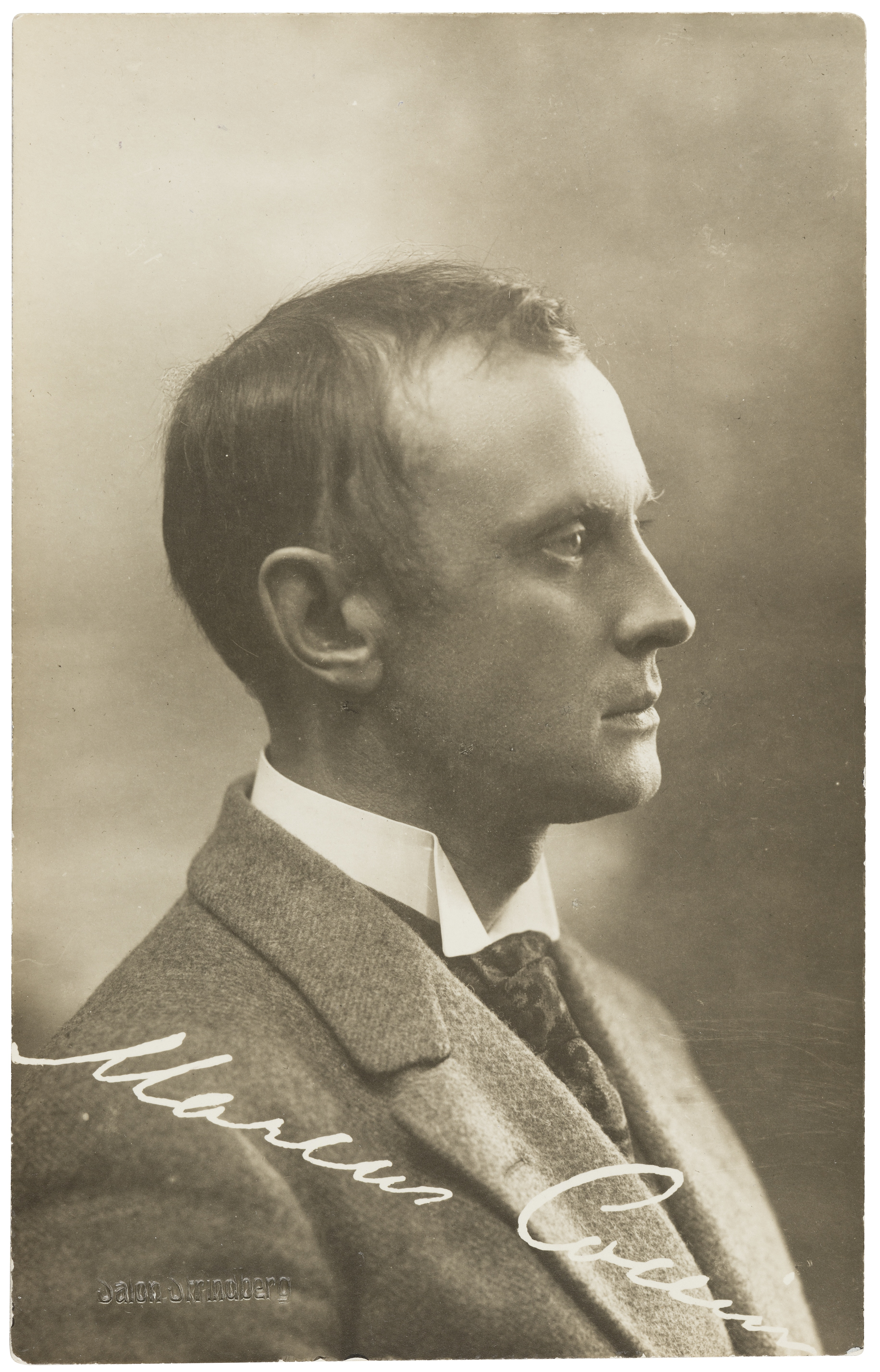
Marcus Collin

Gustaf Marcus Collin (18 November 1882, Helsinki – 22 September 1966, Kauniainen) was an artist from Finland. He was one of the central members of the Novemberists, a group of Finnish expressionists.

Collin was born in Helsinki to an educated, Swedish-speaking family. His father was a civil servant. His future as an artist was not at first obvious. He studied law, but did not want to become a civil servant in the Finland as A Grand Duchy ruled by Russia. He worked as a journalist, and tried to study architecture, but found the mathematics classes too challenging. Then he changed his studies to study art, first in Helsinki, later in Paris. He made four extended trips in continental Europe, and on his fourth visit to Paris he enrolled in Académie Ranson, where he was taught by Paul Sérusier. Sérusier drew his attention to composition, and for a while even the use of colour in Collin's work showed the influence of Sérusier. The paintings of life in the Finnish archipelago, painted in bright colours, were Collin's final breakthrough as an artist.

Collin became a member of group of artists led by Tyko Sallinen. The group later took the name November Group. In middle of the 1910-decade the group started to use more ascetic palettes, and Collin's colour palette was the most minimal of them all. He only used a few dark shades.

After 1921, Collin gradually abandoned his gray and brown palette by adding more bright colours. When he became older, his style became more realistic.

Collin is known for his paintings of people. Many of these illustrate literature, such as the Aleksis Kivi novel Seitsemän veljestä or the Miguel de Cervantes novel Don Quixote. He portrayed factory workers and farmhands as faceless representatives of their social class.

Collin was given an honorary title of professor in 1953. He received the Swedish Prince Eugen Medal in 1957.
