= Jalmari Ruokokoski =

Finnish painter (1886–1936)

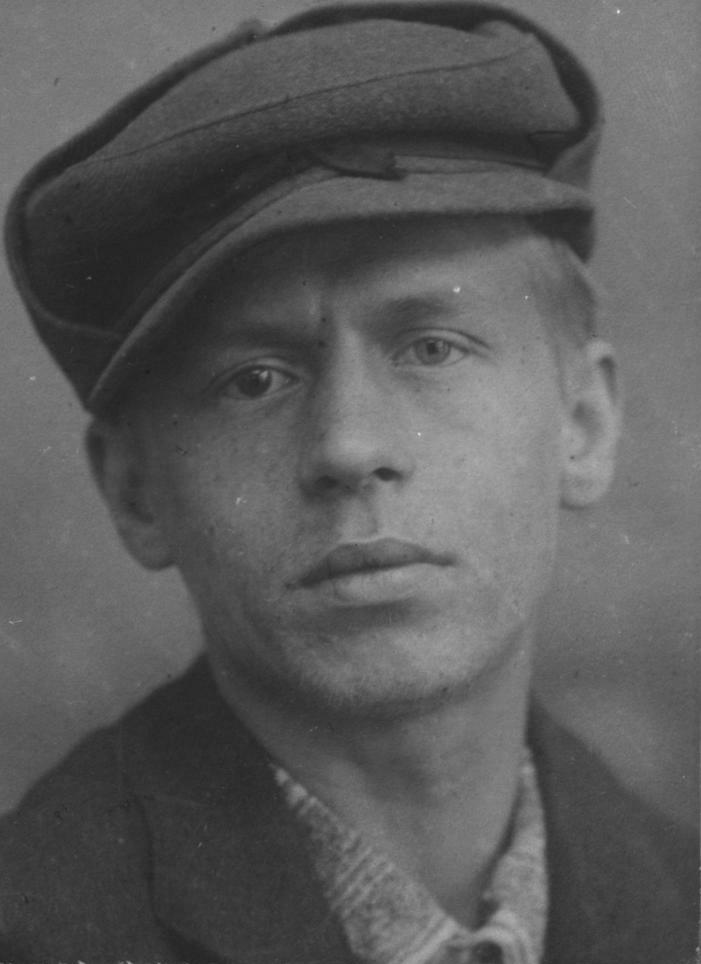
- Ruokokoski in 1912
- Born: 3 December 1886; Saint Petersburg
- Died: 1 April 1936 (aged 49); Helsinki
- Known for: Painting
- Movement: Expressionism

Joel Jalmari Ruokokoski, known as Jali (1886-1936) was a Finnish Expressionist painter. Although most of his works were landscapes and still-lifes, he is probably best known for a series of portraits (including numerous self-portraits) painted mostly during the 1910s. Although Ruokokoski never officially joined the November Group, (Marraskuun ryhmä), he participated in the galleries set up by the group.

== Biography ==
His father was a shoemaker from Savonia. The family returned to Finland when he was thirteen and settled in Helsinki. He studied at the "Central School of Art and Design" from 1902 to 1904 and at the "Art Society Drawing School" from 1903 to 1906. There he met Tyko Sallinen. His first public showing came in 1905. Until his first artistic breakthrough came four years later, he earned extra money by drawing advertisements and cartoons. In 1907 he was engaged with a girl named Olga, whom he had encountered in a cafe that he frequently visited. The engagement was broken after a short while the same year.

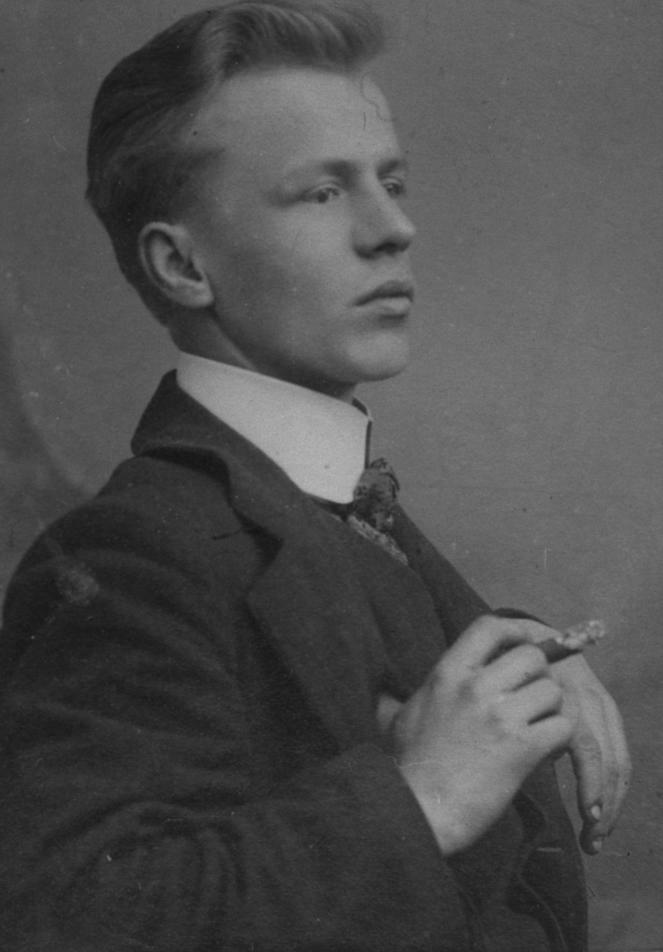
Ruokokoski with a Cigar (1912)

He was very fond of public festivities; especially the circus. In 1909 he married a Swedish-Italian tightrope walker named Elvira Bono. In 1910, they were able to take a trip to Paris, courtesy of a scholarship, and he was introduced to the work of the Impressionists.

In 1912, he spent some time in Helsingør, Denmark, with the family of Niels-Peder Rydeng (1880-1949), a tailor and art collector who had once employed Tyko Sallinen. Word had gotten about that Rydeng was a generous man who would offer free room and board in return for paintings. He stayed for several weeks, producing sixty paintings, including portraits of Rydeng's family. They developed a lasting friendship and Ruokokoski returned there many times for brief visits.

Back in Helsinki, he was able to sell all the paintings he had brought with him at an exhibition in the Ateneum, but spent most of the money on a drinking and partying binge. This (and a possible flirtation while he was in Helsingør) created a rift between him and his wife, which widened, so they separated. He attempted to emigrate to America in 1914, but the police removed him from the ship due to unpaid debts.

=== Second marriage and more difficulties ===
In 1915, he settled in Hyvinkää, where he and Sallinen opened adjacent studios called "Humala ja Krapula" (Drunk and Hungover). Ruokokoski lived in "Drunk", painting what he saw from his windows, with an occasional trip to do landscapes. He stayed there until 1918, when he divorced Elvira and married Saima Forsström, a model, despite his studio's financial failure. They stayed together for ten years, then separated, although they never divorced and he continued to visit their five children.

He was always successful as an artist, exhibiting throughout Scandinavia as well as Rome and Milan, but continued to squander most of his money and was never far from financial ruin. He began producing quickly sketched pictures of simple things such as leaves, food and sunsets to earn extra income. An antique shop that he opened in 1924 failed after only a year. By 1931, he was barely eking out a living from a small tenement apartment.

His last exhibition was in 1935. Toward the end of that year, he was hospitalized for alcohol abuse, which had damaged his liver and given him throat cancer. He died the following spring.

== Works ==
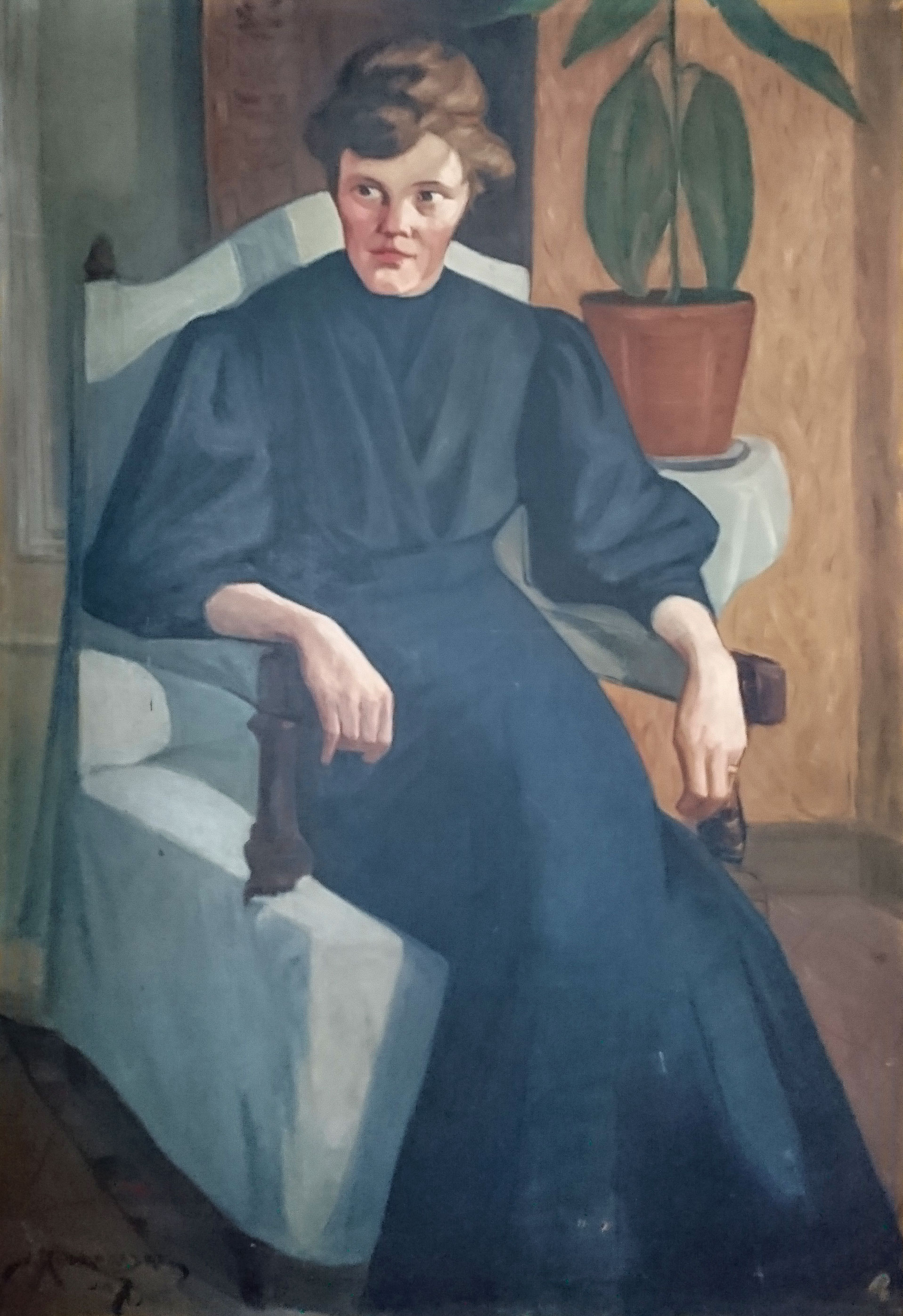
Portrait of Olga, 1907, his fiancée

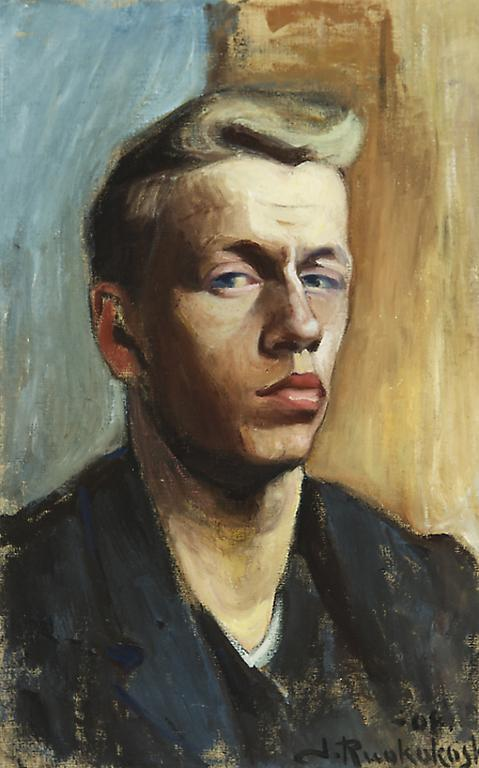
Self-Portrait, 1908

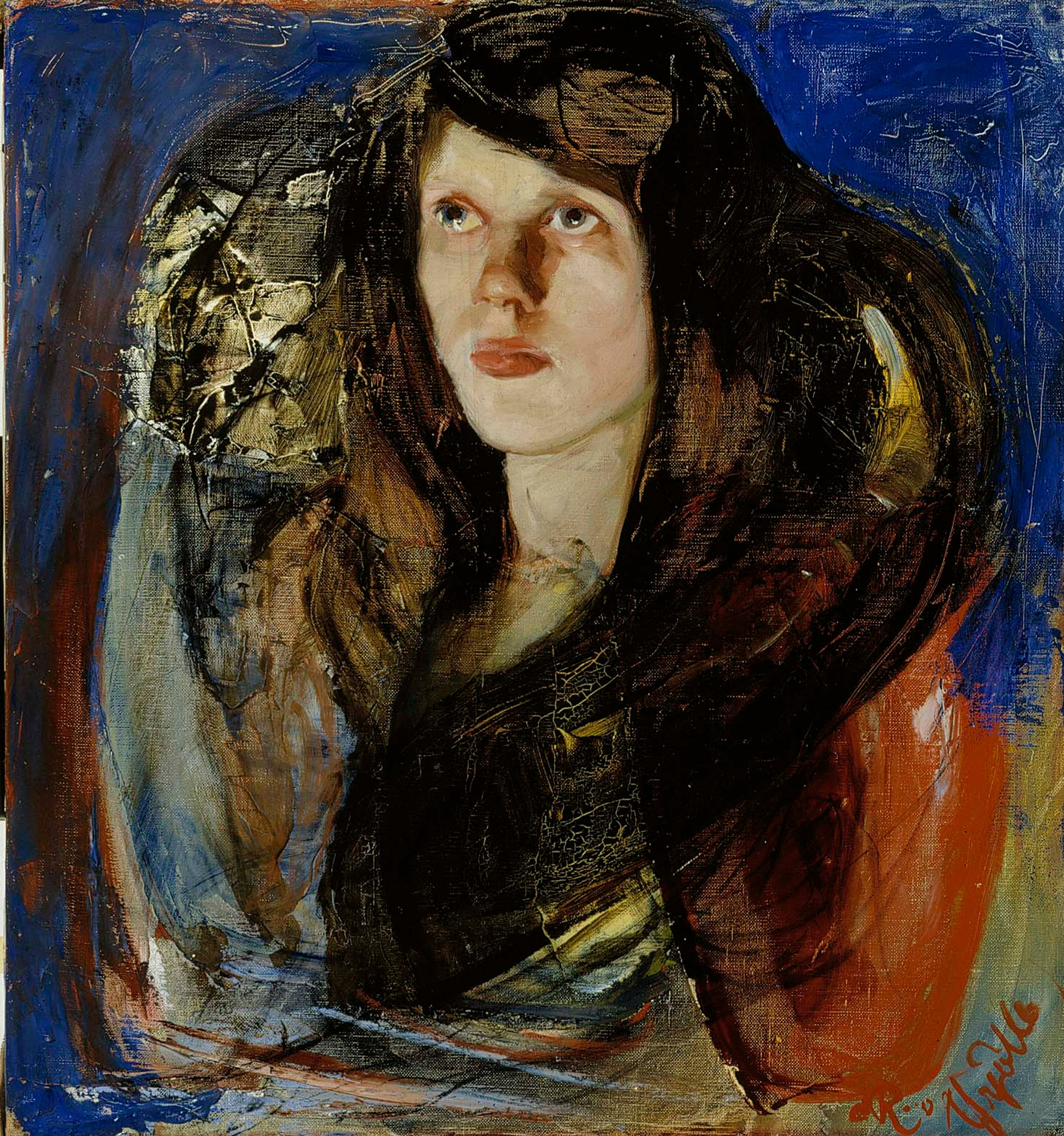
Love (Elvira Bono), 1910

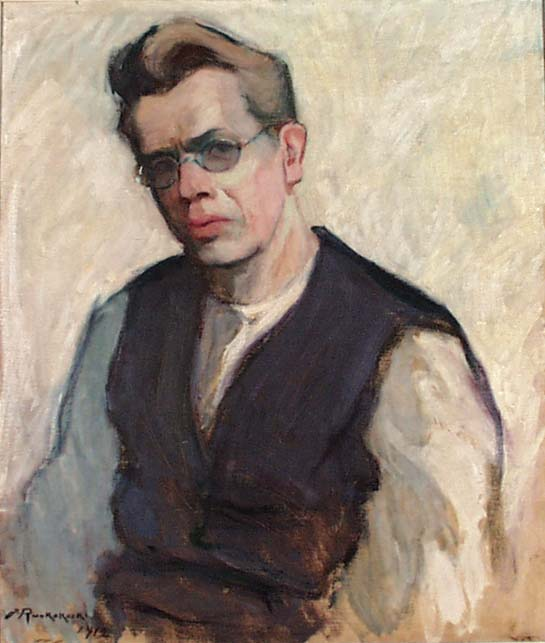
Self-Portrait, 1912

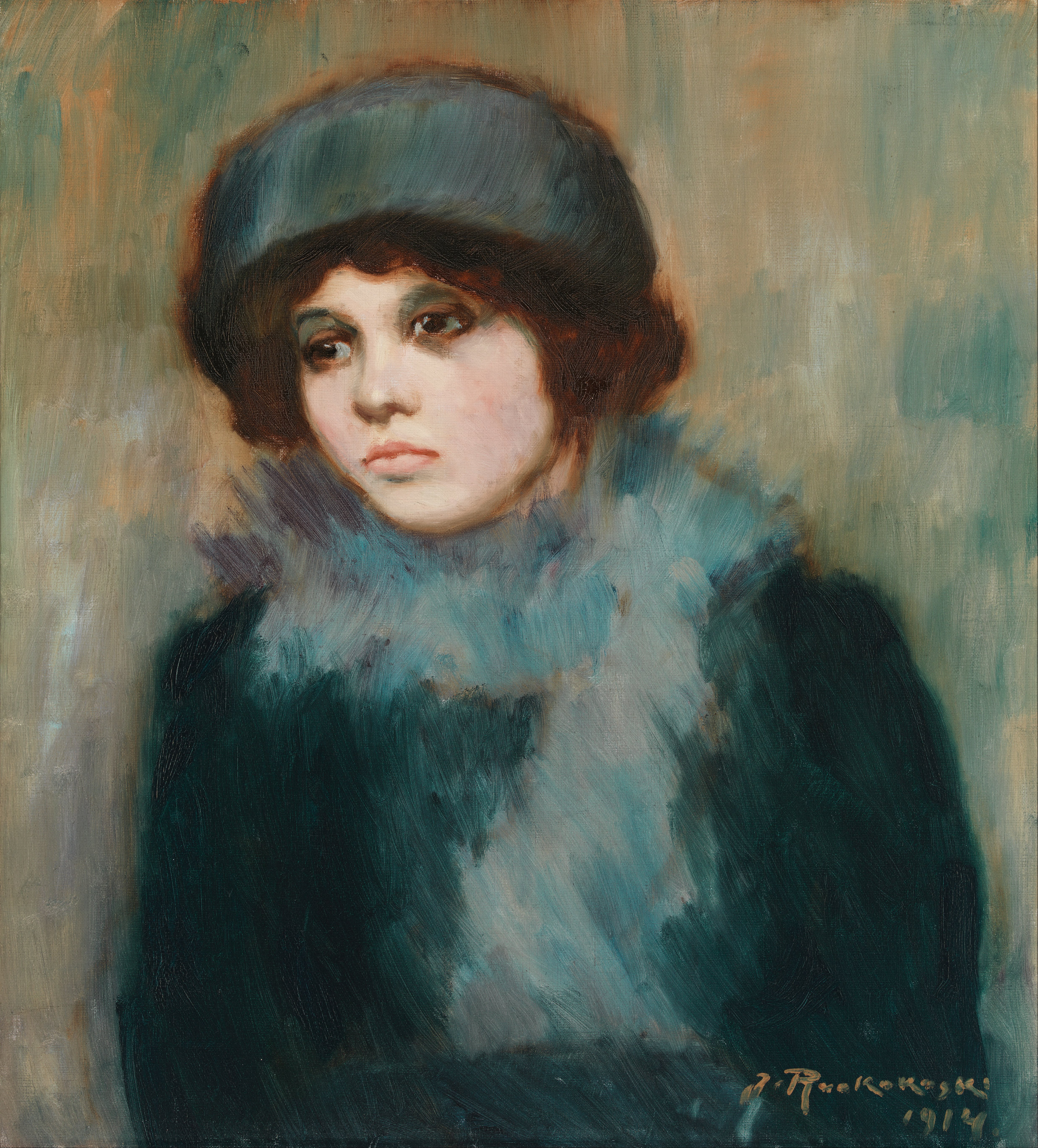
Woman, 1914

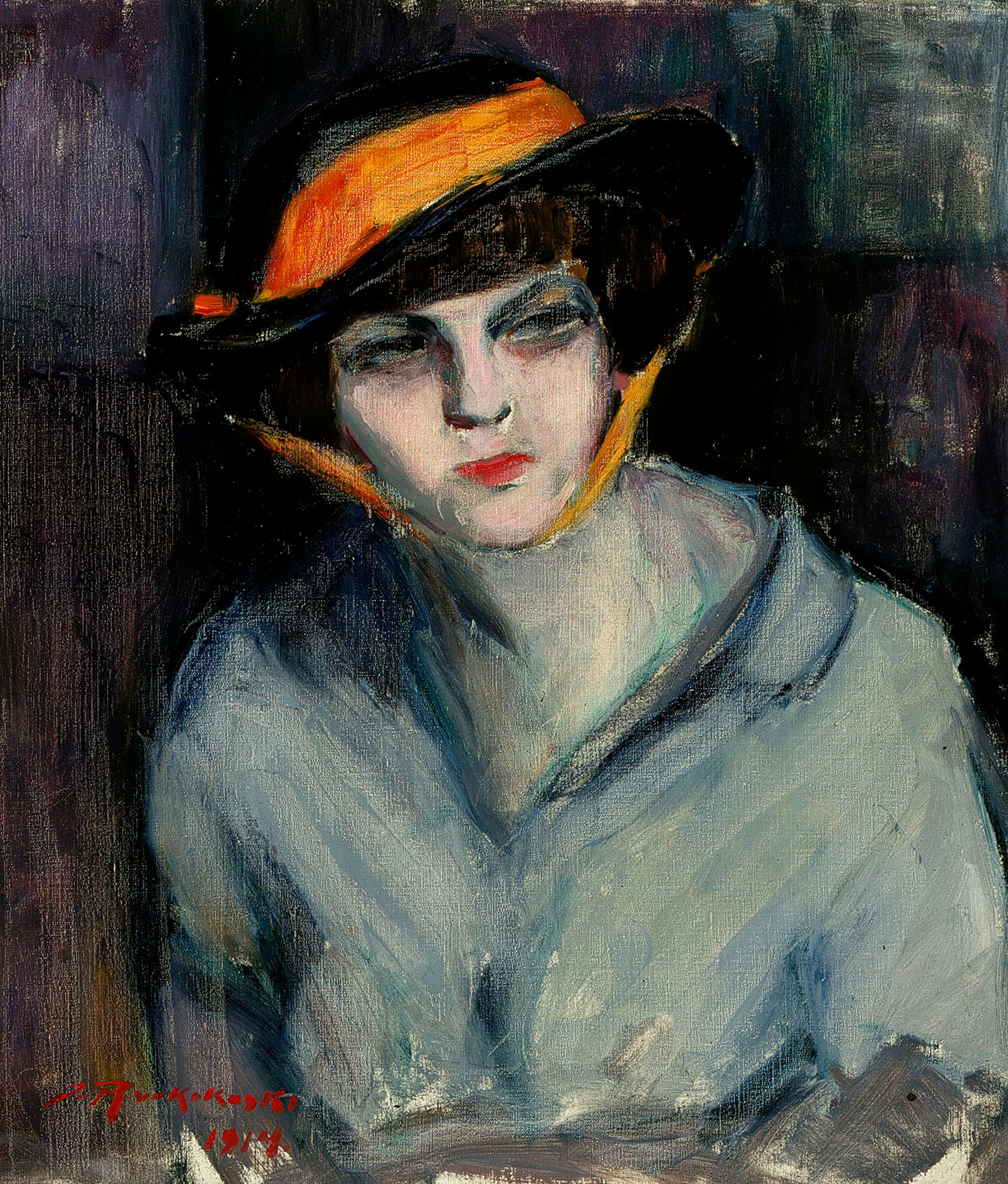
Woman with a Hat, 1914

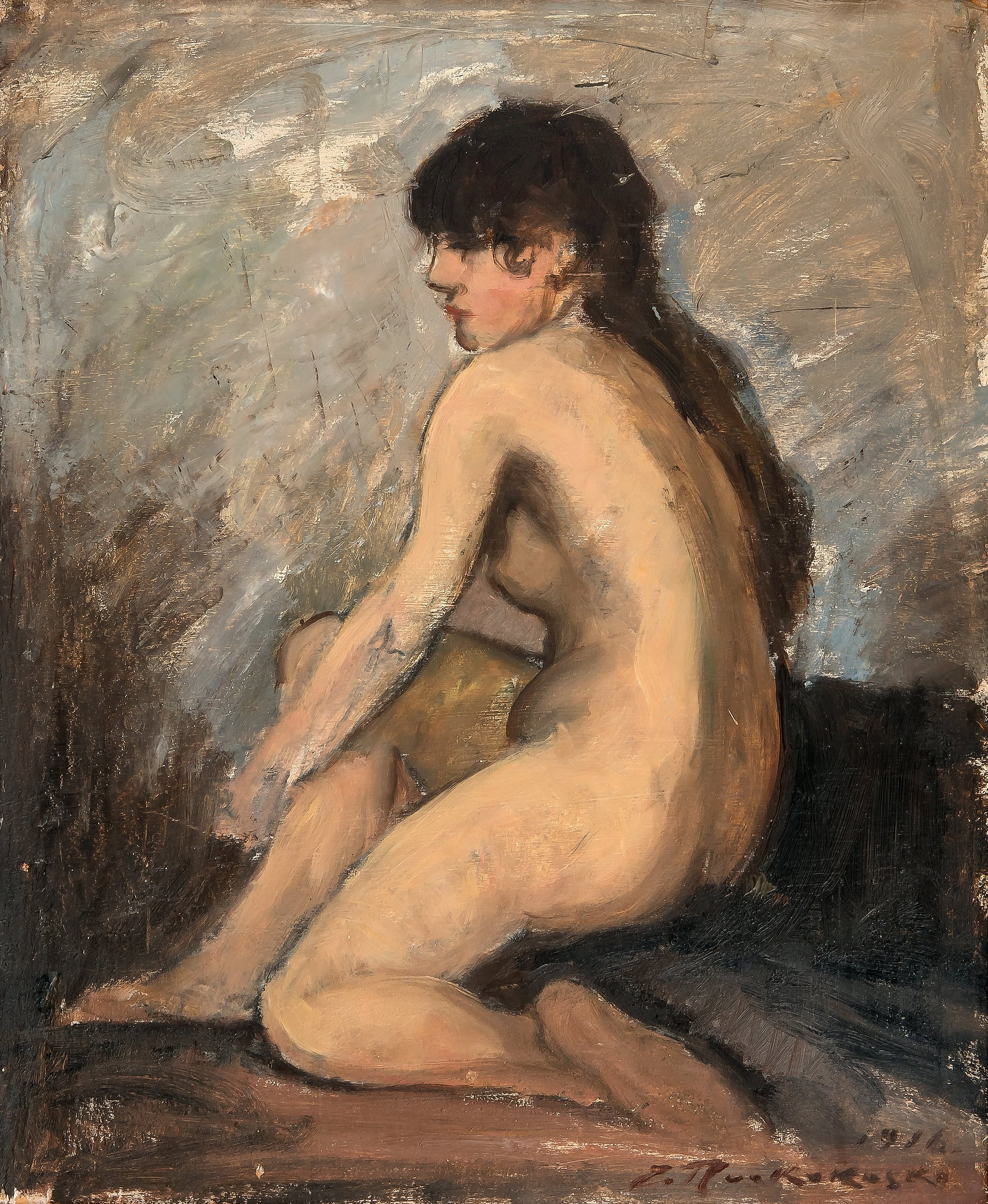
Sitting Model, 1916

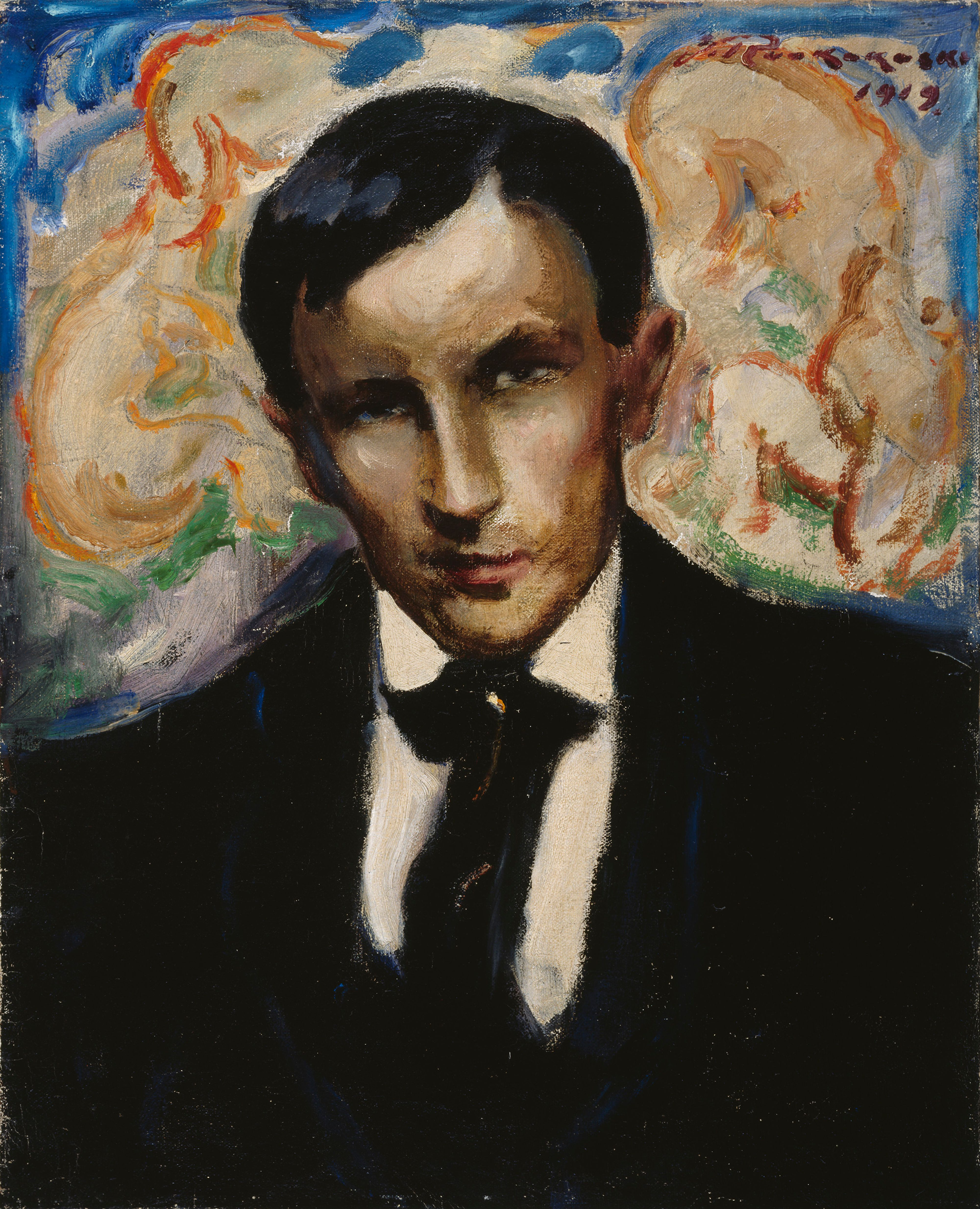
Portrait of Tyko Sallinen, 1919

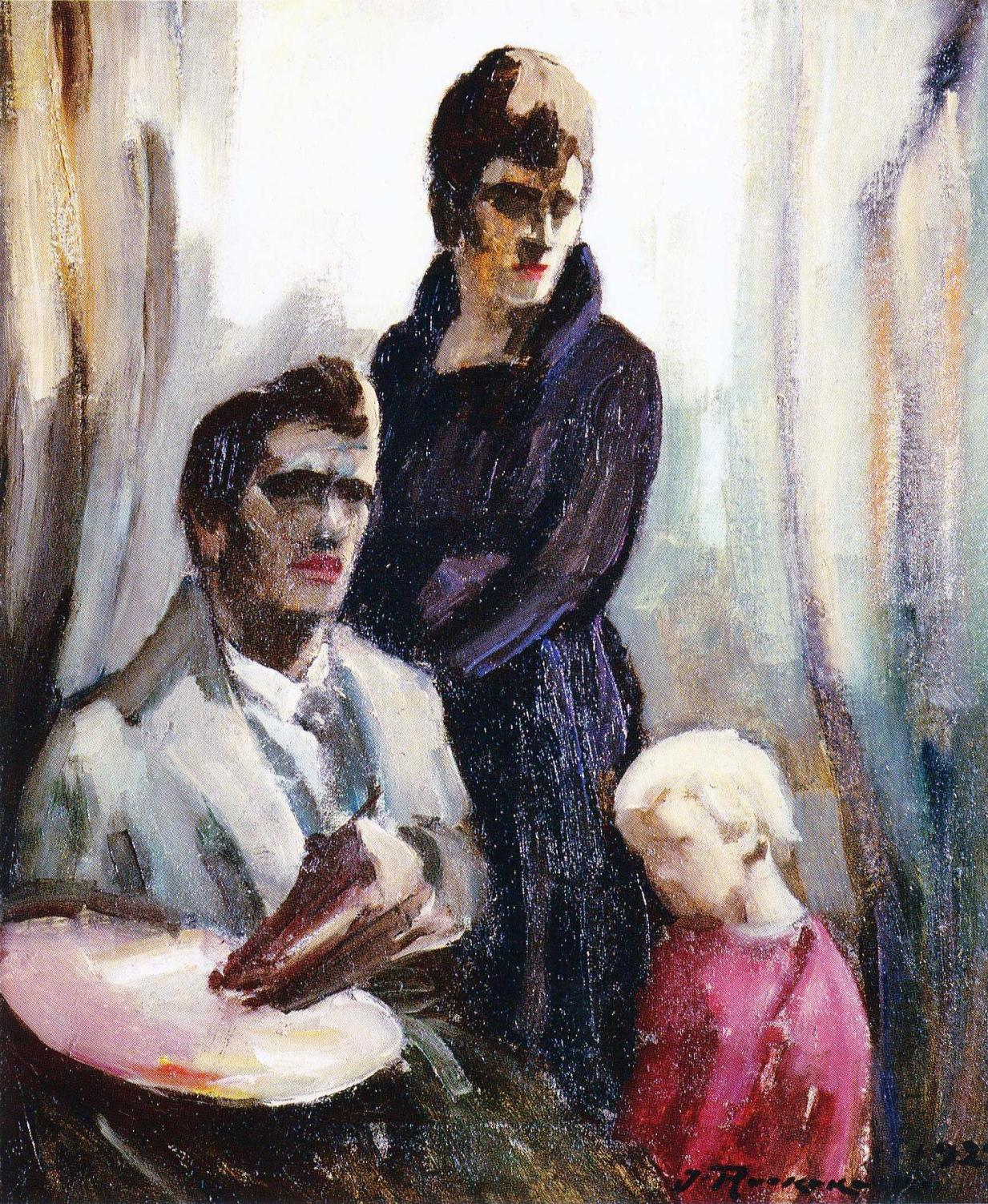
Artist's Family, 1922

== See also ==
- Finnish art
