= Cris af Enehielm =

Finnish artist (born 1954)

Cristina Marianne (Cris) af Enehielm (born March 24, 1954, Helsinki) is a Finnish artist.

Af Enehielm graduated as a visual artist from Fria konstskolan in Helsinki in 1977, and as an actress from the Theatre Academy in Helsinki in 1981. She is the mother of two sons: Andreas and Theodore.

Af Enehielm has worked as an actress in radio, television and film, as a visual artist, performance artist, singer, director, costume designer, set designer, educator and lecturer, and as teacher in acting at the Theatre Academy in Helsinki. She has also participated in a number of dance productions. She has worked at the Raivoisat Ruusut (Raging Roses) theatre, Swedish Theatre, Klockriketeatern and the Lilla teatern in Helsinki, Wasa Teater, Printing Theatre in Karis, the Royal Dramatic Theatre in Stockholm, Sweden. In 2004, she directed a play at the Bellman's Festival.

She has had several solo exhibitions, in Gallerie Pelin, Gallerie Anhava, Gallerie Forsblom, and Titanik Gallerie in Helsinki. She has also exhibited in Paris and Stockholm, and participated in several group exhibitions in Finland, Russia, Cuba, Sweden and Denmark. Her art is represented in several art collections, and her work has sold internationally. She has undertaken study tours in Asia and worked as an artist-in-residence at Cité internationale des arts in Paris.

She has been a member of several performance art and music groups: Homo$, Jack Hellen Brut, Sarje ääni, Joan Bennet and the Museo och Transistors. As a member of performance and music groups, she has appeared on numeral international festivals and events (Sweden, Iceland, Denmark, Belgium, Egypt, Switzerland, Austria, Spain, Italy, Portugal, Macedonia, Poland, Russia and Hungary).

She sees herself primary as a multi-artist, and is interested in experimental performance arts. Her special interests involve humans and their destiny. She has studied various therapy methods, among them body therapy. She has also taken lectures at the University of Helsinki in psychoanalysis and philosophy. She claims to be an eternal student always learning something new.
