= Martta Wendelin =

Finnish artist (1893–1986)

Martta Maria Wendelin
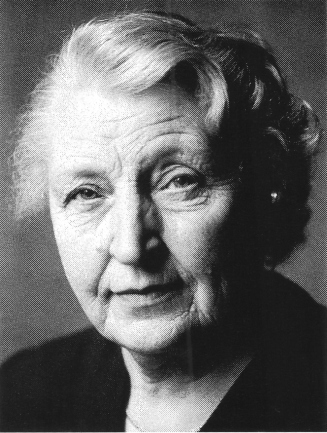
- Martta Wendelin in 1963
- Born: 23 November 1893; Kymi, Finland
- Died: 1 March 1986 (aged 92); Tuusula, Finland

Martta Maria Wendelin (23 November 1893 in Kymi — 1 March 1986 in Tuusula) was a Finnish painter.

She illustrated fairy tales and school books, and drew postcards and magazine covers. The high time of her career was in 1930s, when magazines were able to use good quality images, but use of photographs was not yet that common.
