= Jochim Neiman =

Jochim Neiman (1600-1673) was a German-born traveling painter who primarily worked in Finland which was then part of Sweden.

After being born in Germany, Neiman moved to Stockholm during Gustavus Adolphus of Sweden's reign, and trained as a painter there. A work boom for artists in Finland lured him in 1631 to work in Turku. He participated in restorations at the Turku Cathedral. In the early 1650s he was a pioneer of portrait painting as Finland's first portrait painter. He produces works of a large number of the Royal Academy of Turku's professors, but almost all were destroyed in the Turku fire of 1738 and the Great Fire of Turku in 1827. Neiman also painted the portraits of a number of clergy, including the vicar of the church in Rauma (1640), and the bishop of Gripsholm Castle (1652). A portrait of Gustav Horn, Count of Pori by Neiman now resides at the Nordic Museum. Neiman was also a teacher, and apprenticed a number of painters including Abraham Myra and Didrik Möllerum.
