= Nikolai Lehto =

Finnish painter (1905–1994)

Nikolai Lehto (1905 Halikko - 1994 Turku) was a Finnish painter. He was interested in art when he moved to Turku in the 1920s. At a beginning, productions were traditional, realistic and paintings of humans. In time, artist went more to naivistic and surrealistic -style. Most popular works included humans and animals.
