= Alvar Cawén =

Painter

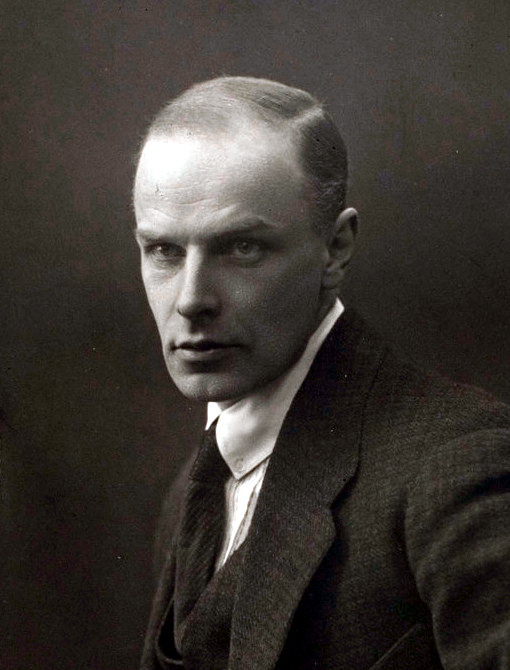
- Alvar Cawén in the 1910s
- Born: Frans Alvar Alfred Cawén; 8 June 1886; Korpilahti, Grand Duchy of Finland
- Died: 3 March 1935 (aged 48); Helsinki, Finland
- Known for: Painter
- Movement: Expressionism

Frans Alvar Alfred Cawén (8 June 1886, Korpilahti – 3 March 1935 Helsinki) was a Finnish expressionist painter.

== Biography ==
Frans Alvar Alfred Cawen was born in central Finland on 8 June 1886 at Korpilahti, the son of the Revd. Frans Cawen and Eleanora Cawen (née Boije af Gennas), both of whom were interested in music and art. Several well-known artists were friends of his parents. As a young man Cawen studied at the Academy of Fine Arts (Finland) between 1905 and 1907, and in Paris between 1908 and 1909 at the studio of Simon Cottet. He had his first exhibition in Finland in 1910, but in 1912 he returned to Paris, from where he traveled to Brittany and Spain.

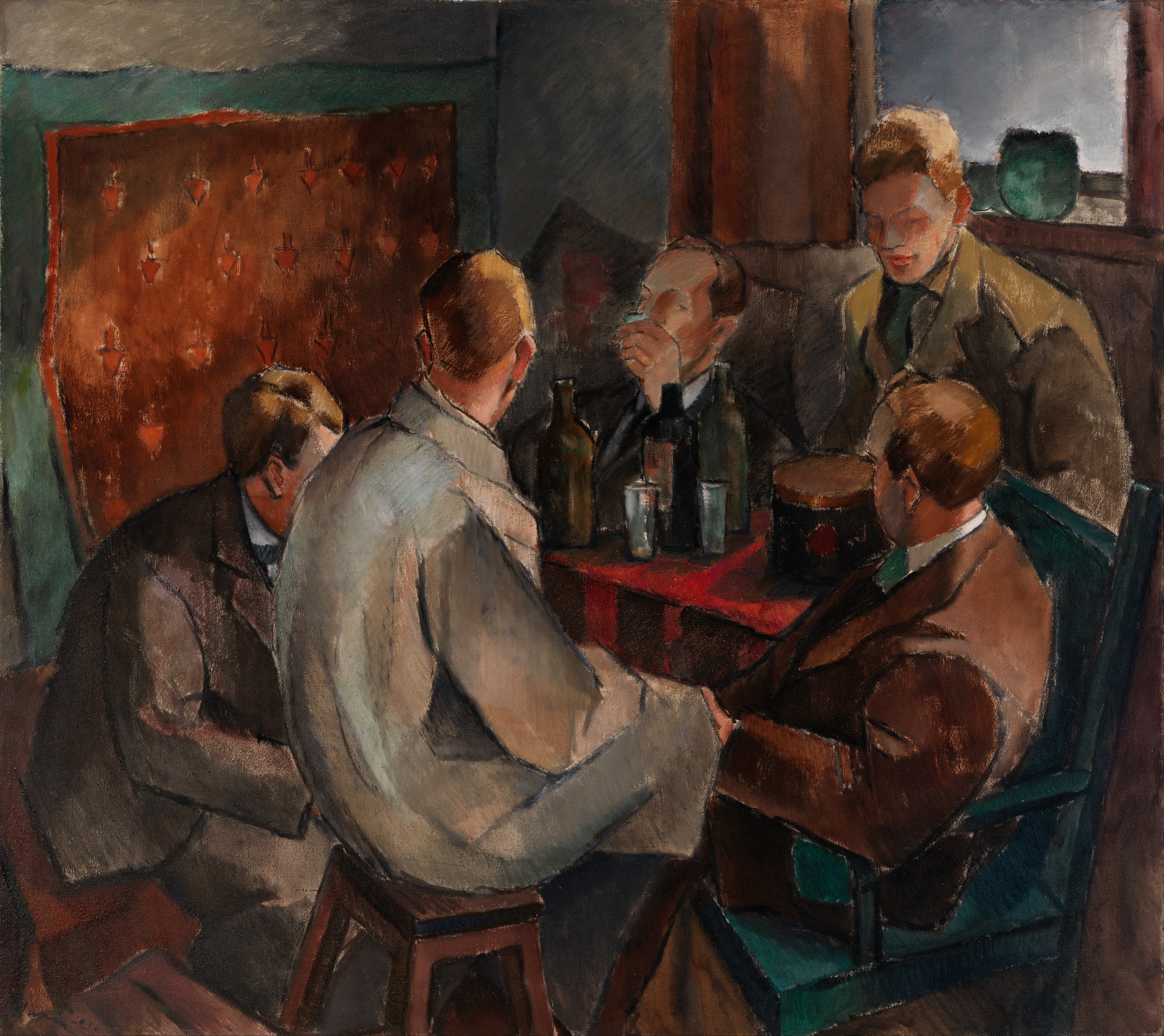
Members of the November Group, 1921

In late 1916 Cawen became a founder member of the November Group, which was a Finnish group of expressionists and cubists. After the first World War he travelled in 1919 to Denmark, Italy, Spain and France; and in that year became a teacher at the Drawing School of the Finnish Art Society, where he continued to teach until 1921.

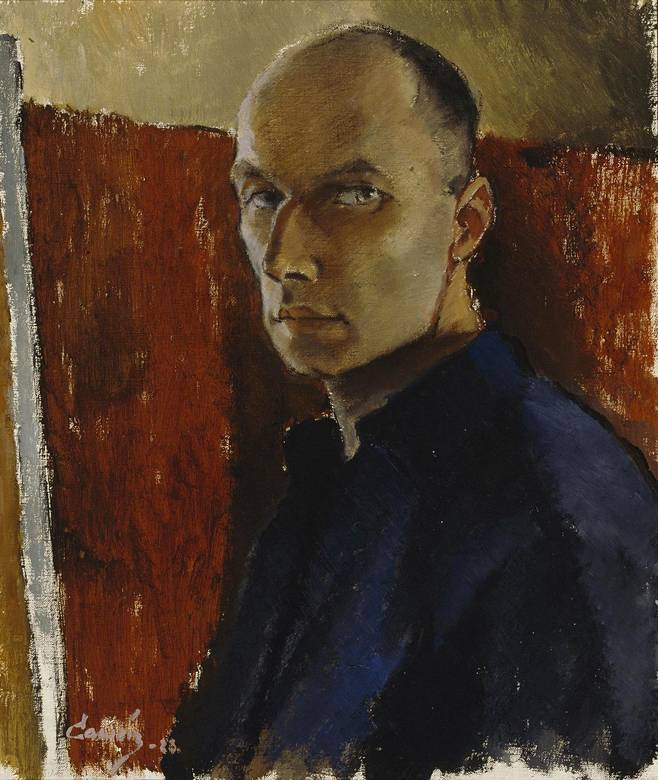
Self-Portrait, 1923

In 1924 he travelled again in Italy, France, Belgium and the Netherlands. In 1929 he became a member of the Fine Art Academy of Finland; and from then until 1935 he was chairman of the Artists' Association of Finland. In Finland Cawen lived near Porvoo at Ilola (his mother's childhood home). Among his works are altarpieces for churches in Mänttä, Kuusankoski, Lapinlahti, and Simpele.

He died at Helsinki on 3 March 1935. He is buried in the Hietaniemi Cemetery in Helsinki.

He married Ragni Cawén (1891–1981), a painter, who following his death continued to paint; the Didrichsen Art Museum owns works by both artists.

== Gallery ==
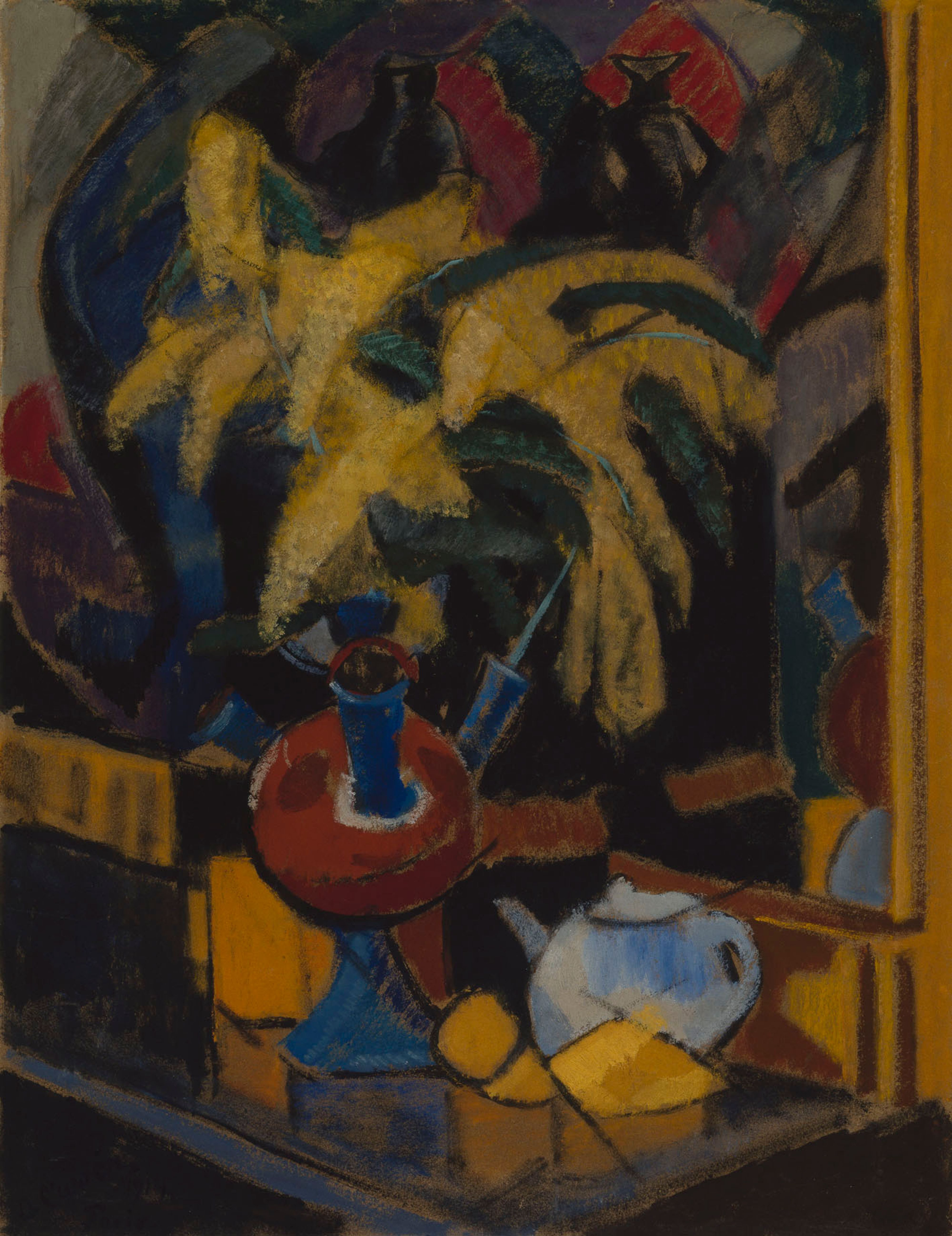
Mimosa, 1914

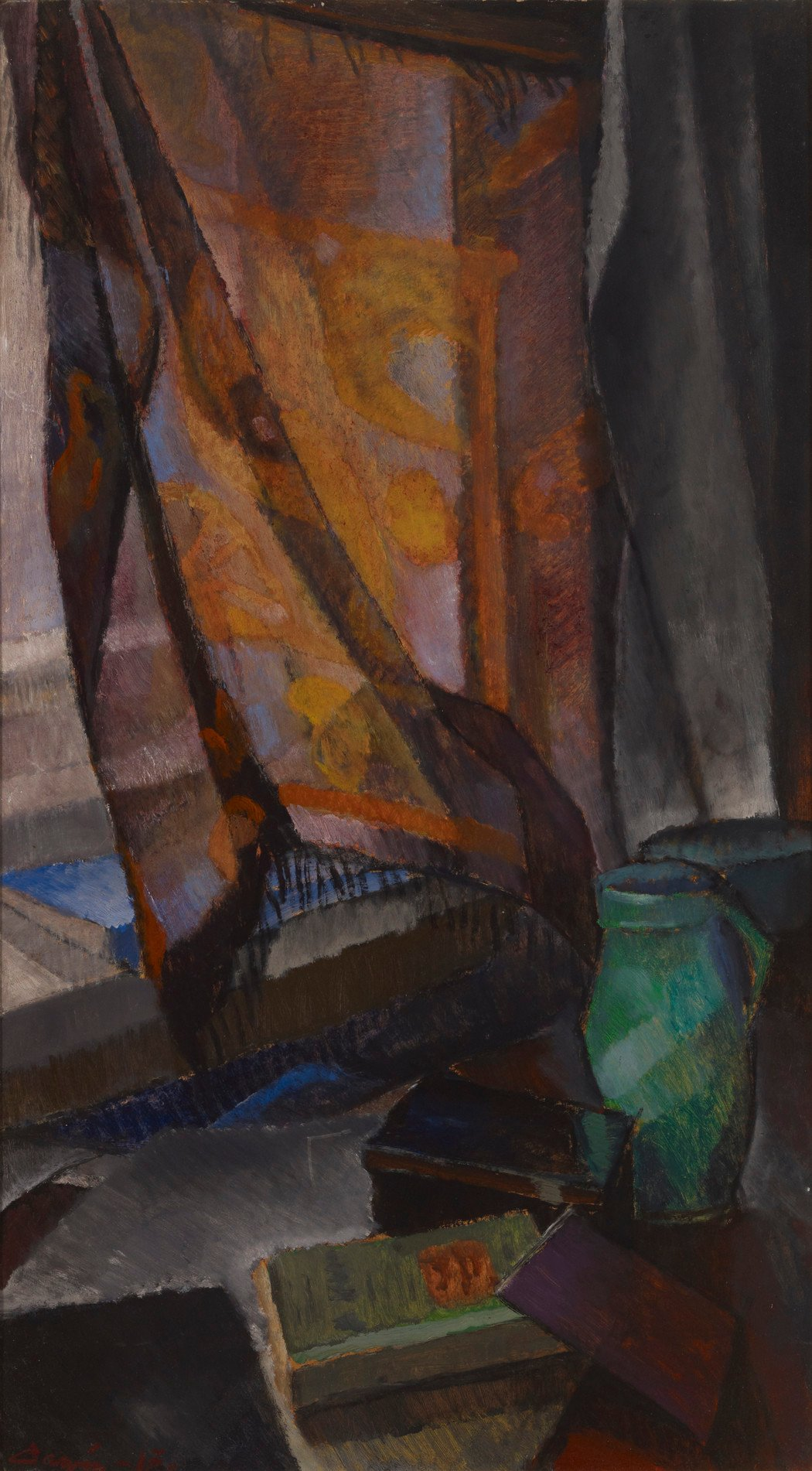
Window, 1917

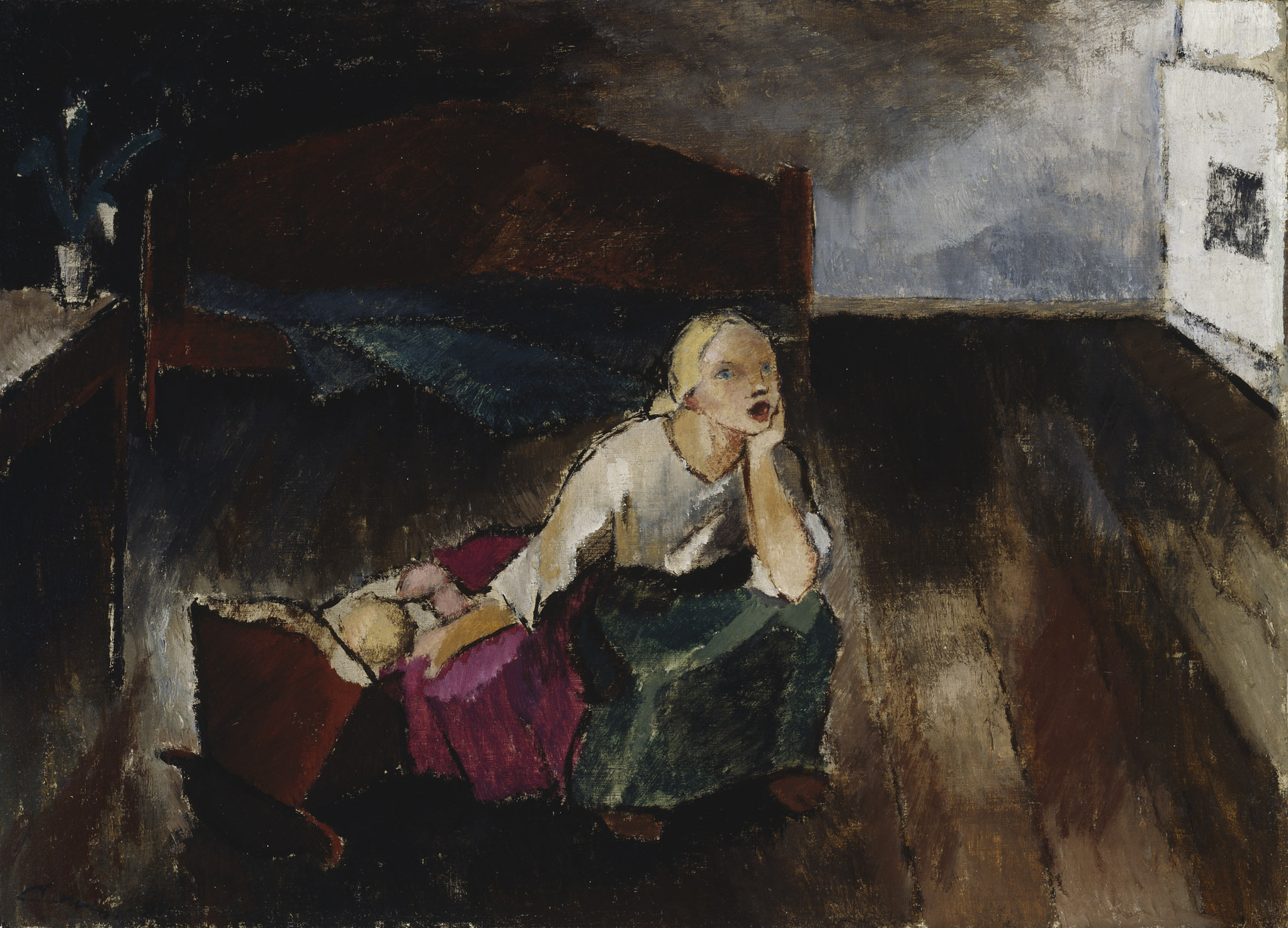
Lullaby, 1921

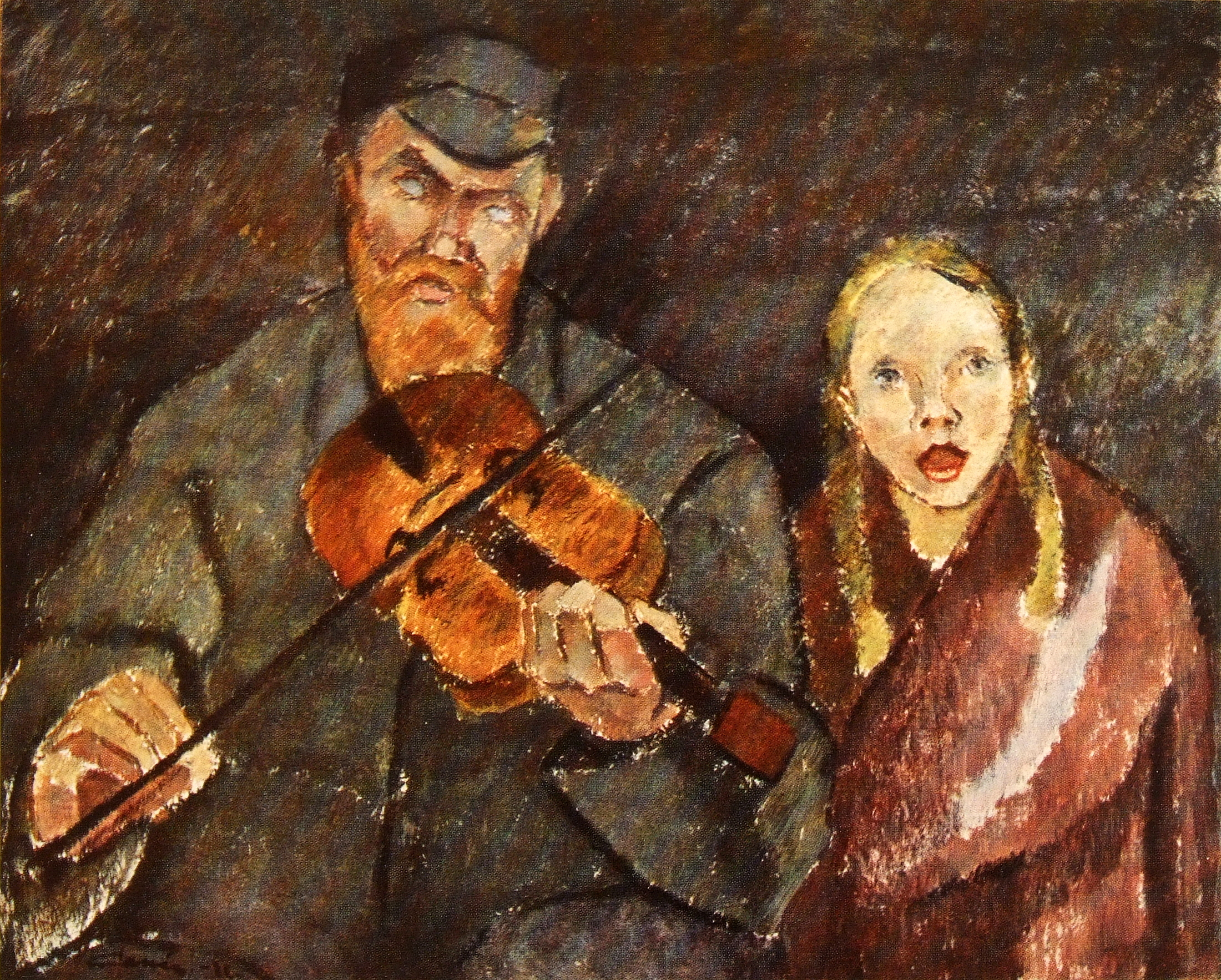
Blind Musician, 1922

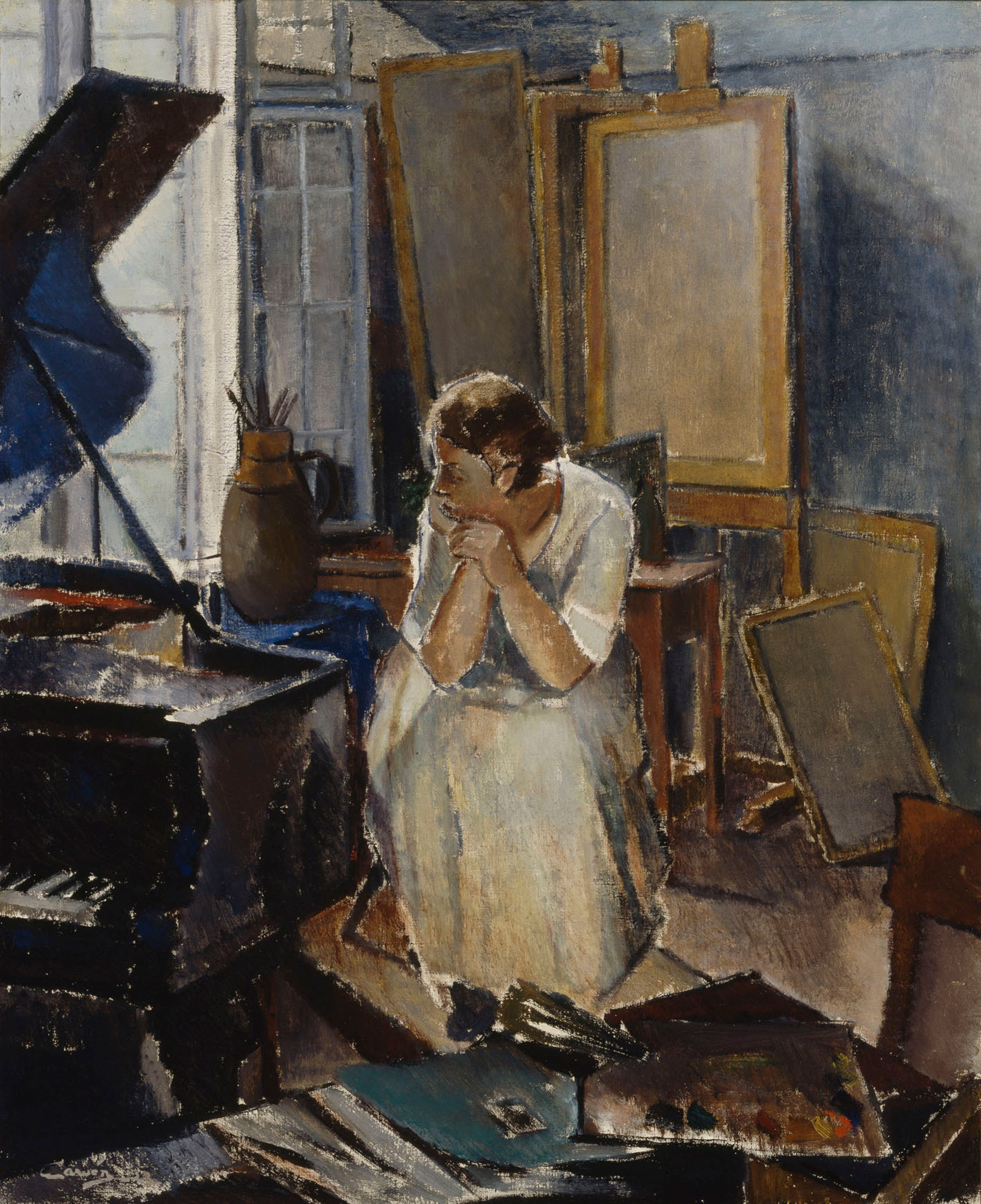
Studio Interior, 1923

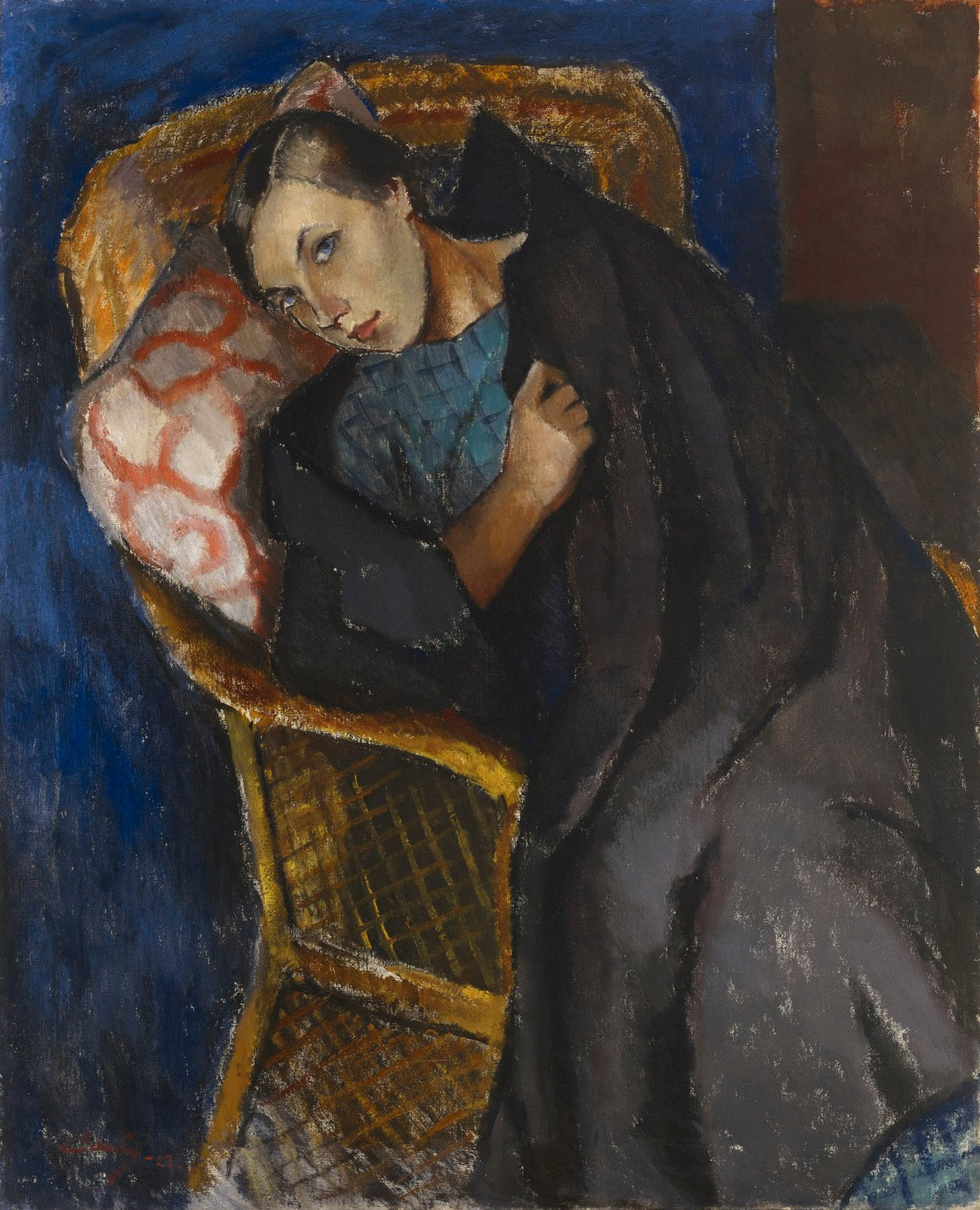
The Convalescent, 1923

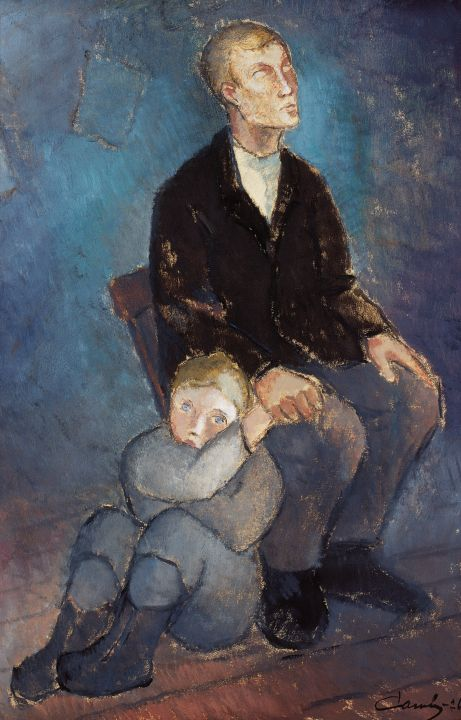
Blind, 1926
