= Totte Mannes =

Finnish painter (1933–2025)

- Born: 15 March 1933; Kajaani, Finland
- Died: 19 July 2025 (aged 92); Madrid, Spain

Totte Mannes (15 March 1933 – 19 July 2025) was a Finnish visual artist. Her oil paintings are on display in many museums and collections. She lived in Madrid, Spain. She had nearly 90 solo exhibitions and over 80 collective exhibitions in 17 countries.

== Recent work ==
Totte Mannes was invited in May 2007, to exhibit her paintings from the past twenty years in two exhibitions in Seinäjoki, Finland: one at the Municipal Art Hall and the other at the Varikko Gallery.

Mannes' works were displayed at the Galleria Uusitalo in Helsinki in July 2007.

Mannes worked on a new series of oil paintings called "Dismantled Sculptures". Mannes described this new series as "de-structivist", in contrast to "con-structivist". The first of the "Dismantled Sculptures" was shown at the Finnish Institute in Madrid from 14 February to 13 March, and then at the Uusitalo Gallery in Helsinki from 2 July 2008. The series (about 40 paintings) toured Mexican art museums in 2008–2009, including San Pedro Museum, Puebla, Tlaxcala Art Museum and Querétaro Municipal Museum, Gumbostrand konst o. Form, Finland (2013–2014) Art Madrid Fair 2014.
