= Sirkka-Liisa Lonka =

Finnish artist (born 1943)

- Born: 1943; Kouvola, Finland

Sirkka-Liisa Lonka (born 27 January 1943, in Kouvola) is a Finnish painter and graphic artist. She studied in Finnish Academy of Fine Arts 1963–67 and department of graphic art 1968.

Lonka debuted in Jyväskylä, (The Museum of Central Finland) in 1969 and in New York City, USA (Young Artists International) 1973. Her works can be seen at Ateneum (Finnish National Gallery), Helsinki Museum of Art, Alvar Aalto Museum, Wäinö Aaltonen Museum and in various other locations all over the world.

She is an honorary member of the Kouvola Artists Association, Artists Association of Amazon, Nicaraguan Artists Union and Solentiname Art and Craft Union.

== Publications ==
- Nip of Love – Rakkauden puraisu 1983
- Sirkka-Liisa Lonka, Parvs Publishing 2012 Sirkka-Liisa Lonka
