= Didrik Möllerum =

Finnish painter

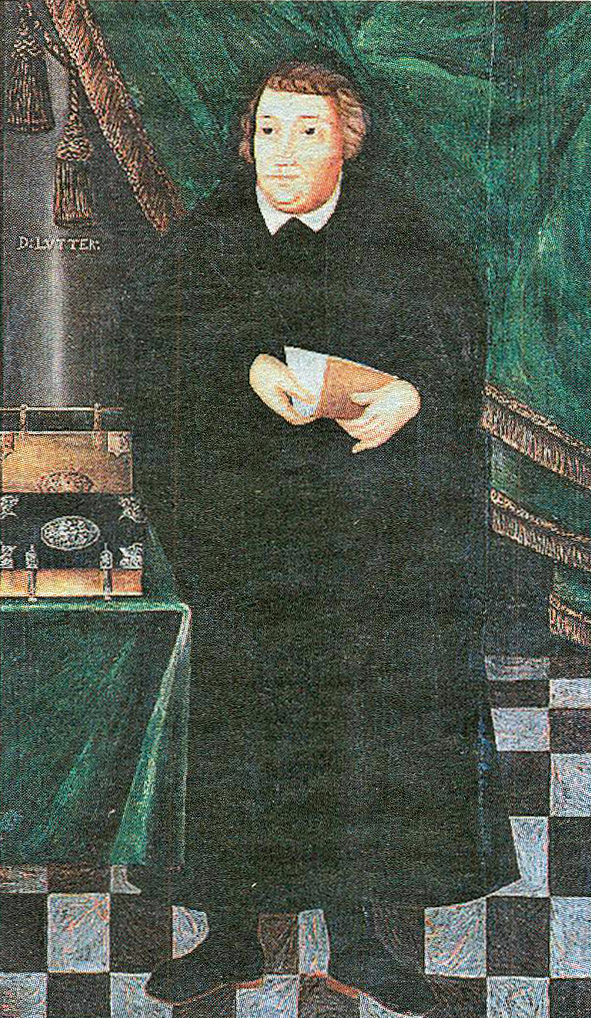
Martin Luther by Didrik Möllerum, from Kyrkpressen No 4

Didrik Möllerum, also Diedrich Möllerum, (1642 – c. 1702) was a Finnish painter.

Möllerum may have been born in Denmark, then later moved to Turku. He initially studied as an apprentice under the painter Jochim Neiman. He primarily painted religious-themed works and altarpieces for church commissions. One of his early documented jobs was restoration work for the Turku Cathedral after a fire in 1681. He is also known to have done some painting for the church in Raahe (1691), and the pulpit and altarpiece painting for the church in Tornio (1701). Möllerum also painted portraits of some of the church vicars. Much of his time was spent working and living in Ostrobothnia and Tornio.
