= Erik Westzynthius the Younger =

Erik Westzynthius the Younger (1743–1787) was a Finnish church painter.

Westzynthius was born in Oulu. His father Erik Westzynthius the Elder was also a painter. He studied painting with Johan Backman and Emanuel Granberg. His only known work is several wall and ceiling paintings between 1779 and 1782 for the Oulainen church.
