= Erik Westzynthius the Elder =

Finnish painter

Erik Westzynthius the Elder (1711 – 1757, in Dublin) was a Finnish painter.

Westzynthius was a religious-themed painter for church commissions, primarily active between 1730 and 1749. He painted some works for the Raahe church in 1746, the Alavieska church, and altarpieces for churches in Paavola, Paltamo, and Pielavesi, which are now in the National Museum of Finland. His son Erik Westzynthius the Younger also became a painter.
