= Isak Wacklin =

Finnish painter (1720–1758)

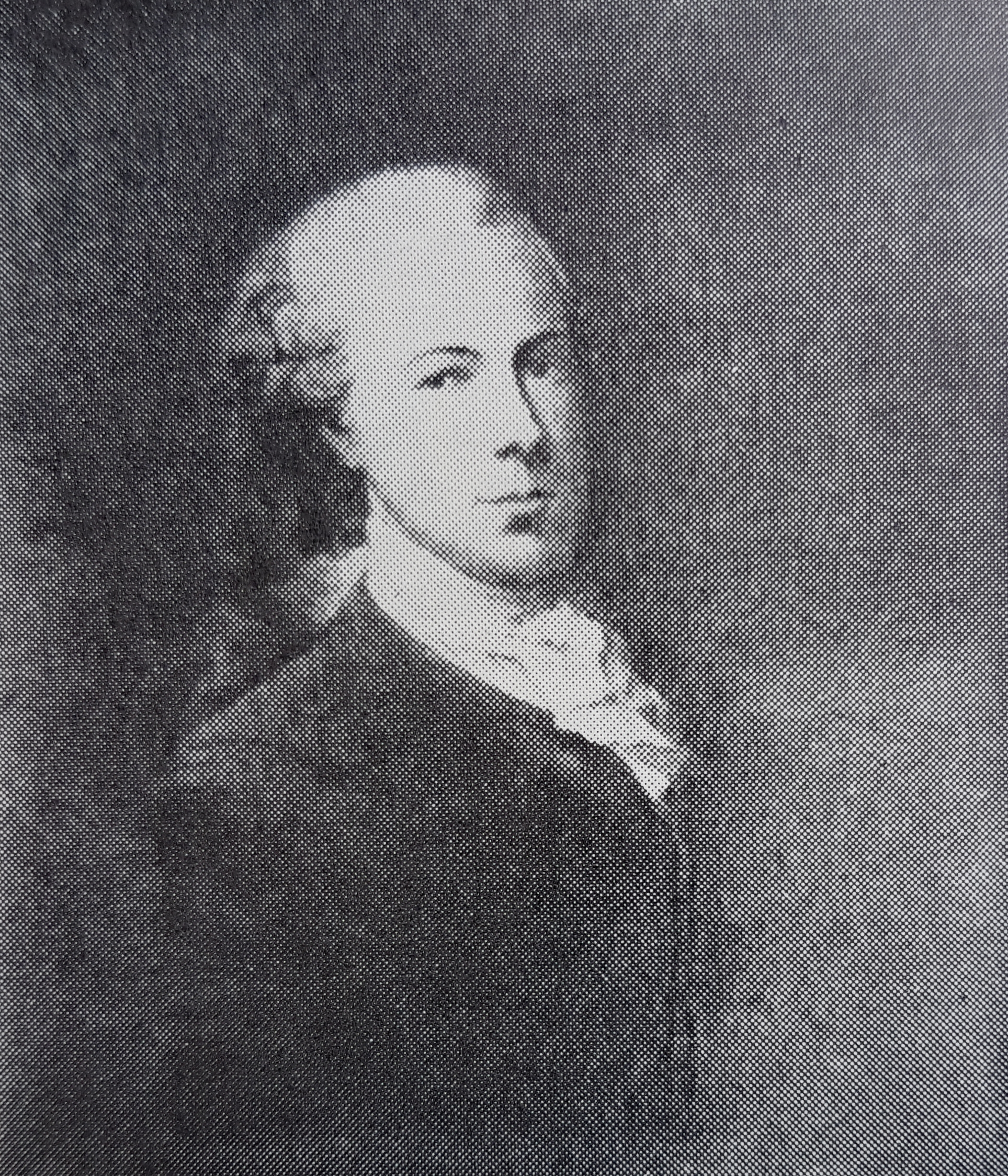
Wacklin's self-portrait

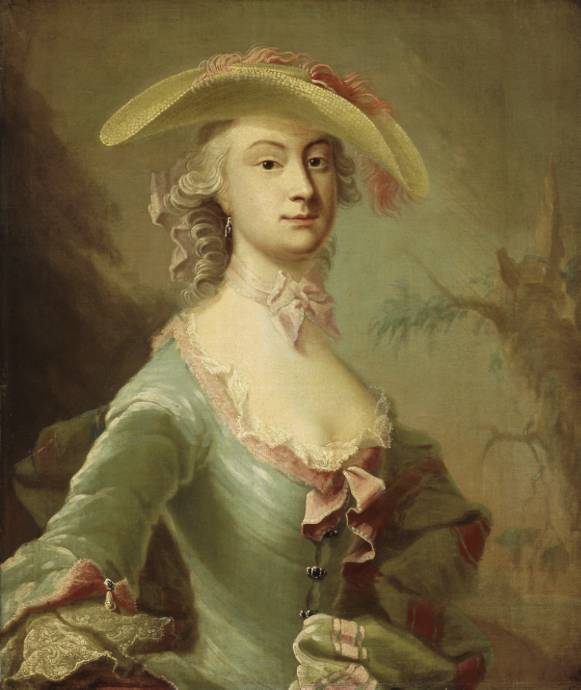
Portrait of Miss Heckford by Isak Wacklin, Finnish National Gallery, 1757

Isak Wacklin, also Isaac Wacklin, (1720 – 9 September 1758) was a Finnish and Swedish painter.

== Life ==
Wacklin was born in Oulu when Finland was under Swedish rule. He has long been a mystery to scientists and art historians. Atheneum conservation-led research team has since 2005 studied the fate of the artist. Wacklin's parents were postmaster Wacklin Mikael and Helena Paldani. His wife was Magdalena Losch. In 1743 he applied for a passport to travel to St. Petersburg. As an artist there he was able to provide for his family, which he was unable to do in Finland. He died in Stockholm, aged 38.

== Career ==
Wacklin studied portrait painting Royal Swedish Academy of Arts between 1731 and 1734, wallpaper painting in Saint Petersburg, and he is also to have studied in Copenhagen. Wacklin was the first professional artist in Finland. He painted portraits, especially in the late 1750s, and along with Nils Schillmark was one of the early Finnish landscape artists. Wacklin was also the only representative of the Finnish rococo movement. Wacklin rococo paintings used dark colors. Wacklin portrait paintings often depict the figures with an ovaloid head, narrow eyes and a long nose. As with most professional artists at that time, he used layer coating techniques in his paintings.

== Works ==
Wacklin is known from 36 known surviving painting, but there may still be unidentified works as well in Sweden. Of the known works there are 27 where current whereabouts of the painting and the owner is known. His paintings can be found in Finnish museums and private collections such as the Atheneum Museum of Art, Gyllenberg Foundation, and the Finnish National Gallery which has 19 paintings. Abroad paintings is the Nationalmuseum in Stockholm and Denmark's Frederiksborg Palace.
