= Abraham Myra =

Finnish painter (1639–1684)

- Born: 1639
- Died: 1684 (aged 44–45)
- Known for: Painting

Abraham Myra (1639–1684) was a Finnish painter.

Myra studied under Jochim Neiman as an apprentice in 1656. He primarily painted religious-themed works and altarpieces for church commissions. Myra was in high demand around Turku during the 1670s. He painted an altarpiece for the church of Houtskär (1670), murals for the church in Korpo (1667–1673), portraits and the organ for the church in Sund, Åland (1671), and a number of works and restorations for the cathedral in Turku (1676). His son Lars Myra also became a painter.
