= Carl Bengts =

Finnish painter

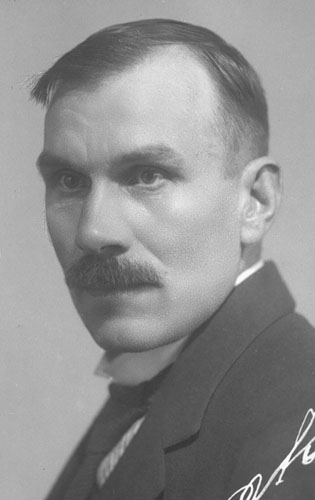
Carl Bengts (date unknown)

Carl Johan Bengts (2 April 1876 – 10 October 1934) was a Finnish painter in the Modernist style who specialized in rural themes.

== Biography ==
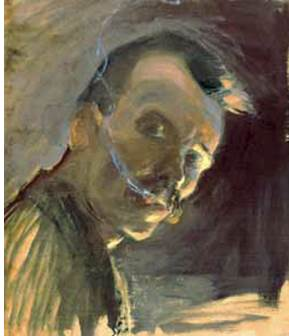
Self-portrait (1904)

He was born in Närpes, was a Swedish-speaking Finn, and came from a family of farmers; his father was an innkeeper. His first art lessons were taken in Helsinki from a decorative artist named Karl Hellsten. From 1895 to 1896 he continued his studies at the "Finnish Art Society Drawing School" (now the Academy of Fine Arts), then attended a similar school in Turku from 1897 to 1898 where he also took private lessons from Victor Westerholm.

He became a student assistant to Akseli Gallen-Kallela after 1899 and helped him to produce frescoes for the Finnish pavilion at the Exposition Universelle (1900). In addition to his paintings and drawings, he designed furniture, rugs, book covers and small buildings. Among the buildings he designed are a cabin and wooden storehouse in Lempäälä (1900); the "Villa Helkavuori" in Kauniainen (1907, designed together with the sculptor, Alpo Sailo) and a residence for the ski manufacturer Julius Uusitupa (1878-1950) on Salmi Beach, near Jyväskylä (1929).

Despite being of Swedish ancestry, he was a great admirer and promoter of Finnish folk-culture. He was also associated with "Septem", a group of artists who introduced French Impressionism to Finland.

After 1900, he became an activist against the administration of Governor-General Nikolay Bobrikov, a time known as the "Ensimmäinen sortokausi" (First Period of Oppression). During this time, he helped thwart Russian censorship by helping to smuggle in banned literature from Sweden.

Later, he acquired an estate in Ekenäs, which he planned to cultivate with his brother Oscar, who was also a painter, but they had to give up the property at the outbreak of World War I. In 1914, he and his wife went to Jyväskylä, where he painted cityscapes and interiors. After the war (from 1918 to 1927), they lived in Kristinestad, then returned to Jyväskylä, where he died in 1934.

== Selected paintings ==
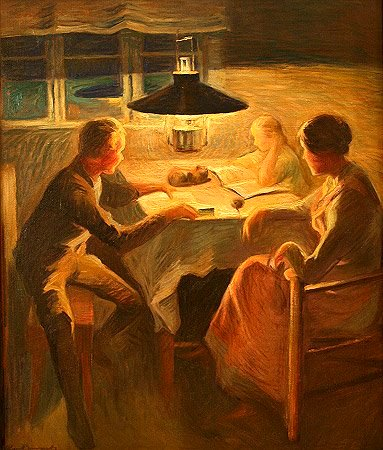
A Family Reading

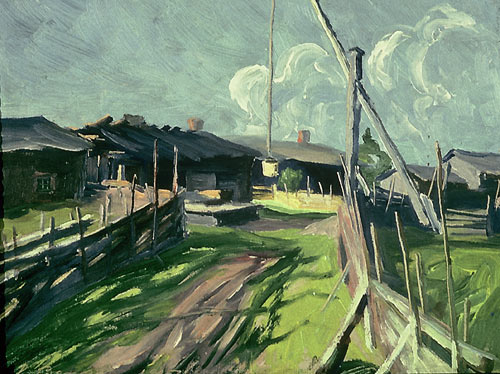
"Rossini's Alley"

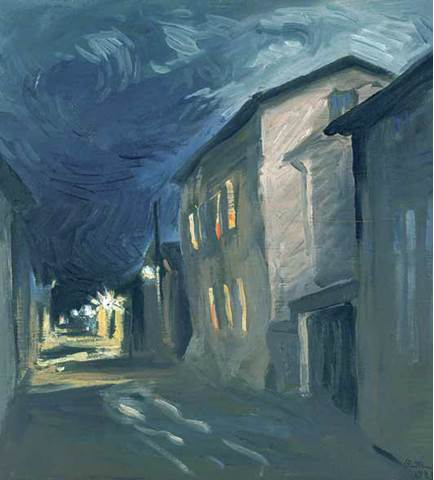
A Street at Night

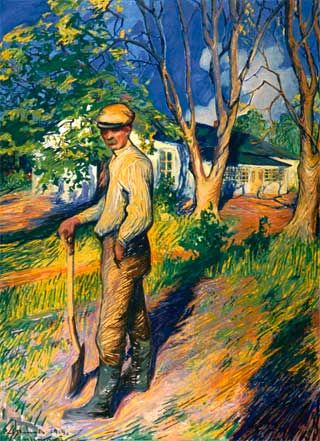
Oscar Leaning on a Shovel

== External links/sources ==
- Photograph of Carl Bengts (1934) by Päijänne Studios (probably still copyrighted)
