= Gottfried Bammes =

German artist

Gottfried Bammes (26 April 1920 – 14 May 2007) was a professor of art at the Dresden Academy of Fine Arts, Germany. His anatomic drawing textbooks have become standard reference works; several have been translated into English.

== Partial bibliography ==
- Die Gestalt des Menschen
- Die neue große Zeichenschule
- Menschen zeichnen
- Der nackte Mensch
- Figürliches Gestalten
- Tiere zeichnen
- Künstleranatomie und bildnerischer Ausdruck
- Körper und Gewand
- Studien zur Gestalt des Menschen
- Wir zeichnen den Menschen - 1989
- Landschaften (Ein Ausdruck zu bildnerischem und künstlerischem Ausdruck)

== Awards ==
- National Prize of East Germany for science and technology (1974)
- Culture and Art Award of the city of Freital (2000)
- Honorary citizenship of Freital (2004)
