= Lars Myra =

Finnish painter

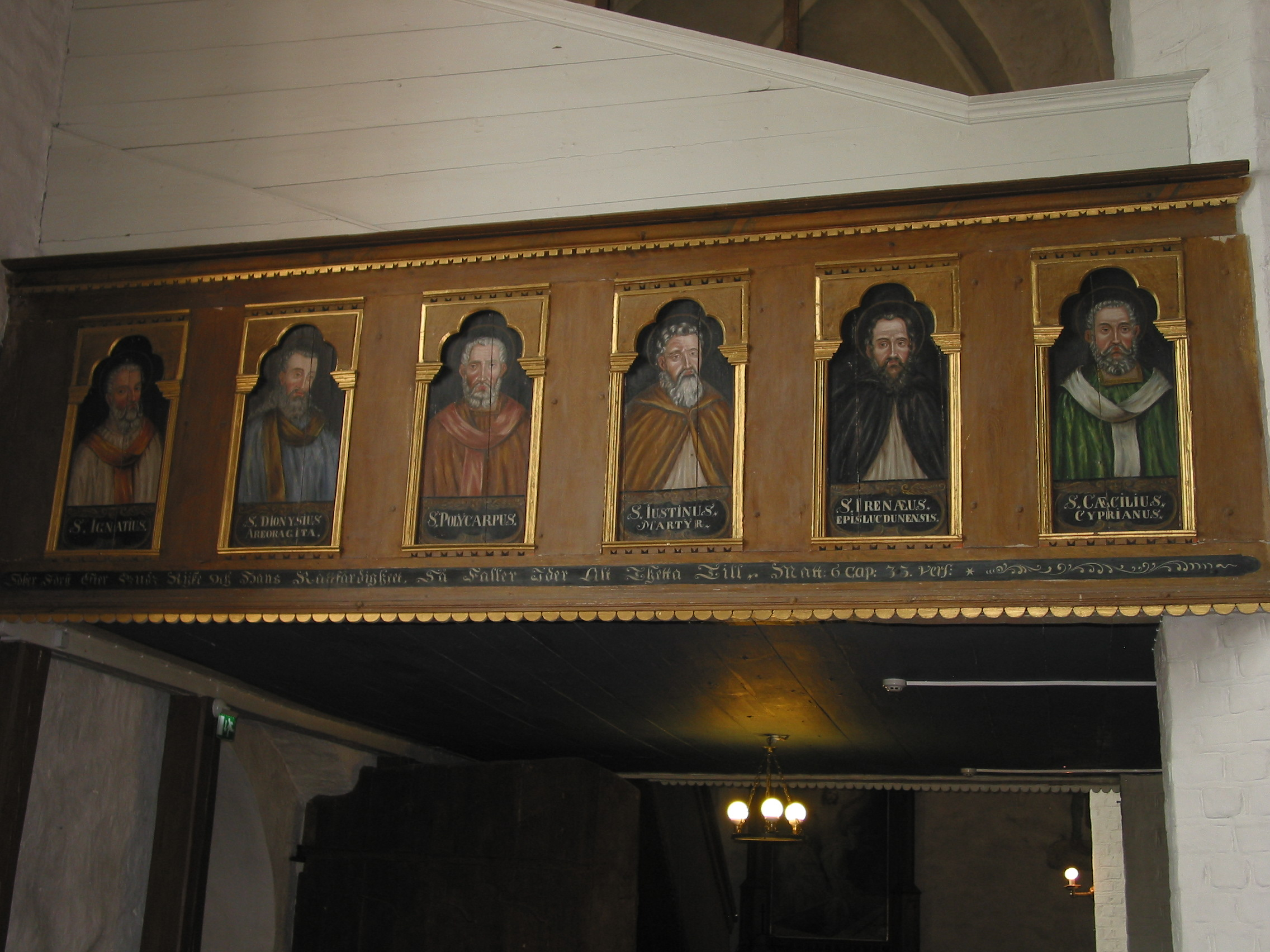
Paintings in the gallery by Lars Myra in 1695 at the 15th-century stone church in Sauvo

Lars Myra (died 1712) was a Finnish painter. His date of birth is not known.

Myra's father was the painter Abraham Myra, whom he trained under. He primarily painted religious-themed works and altarpieces for church commissions. Myra worked on the Turku Cathedral and painted the altar for the Perniön church in 1703. He also painted portraits, most notably ones of Charles XI of Sweden and his wife Ulrika Eleonora.
