= Nils Schillmark =

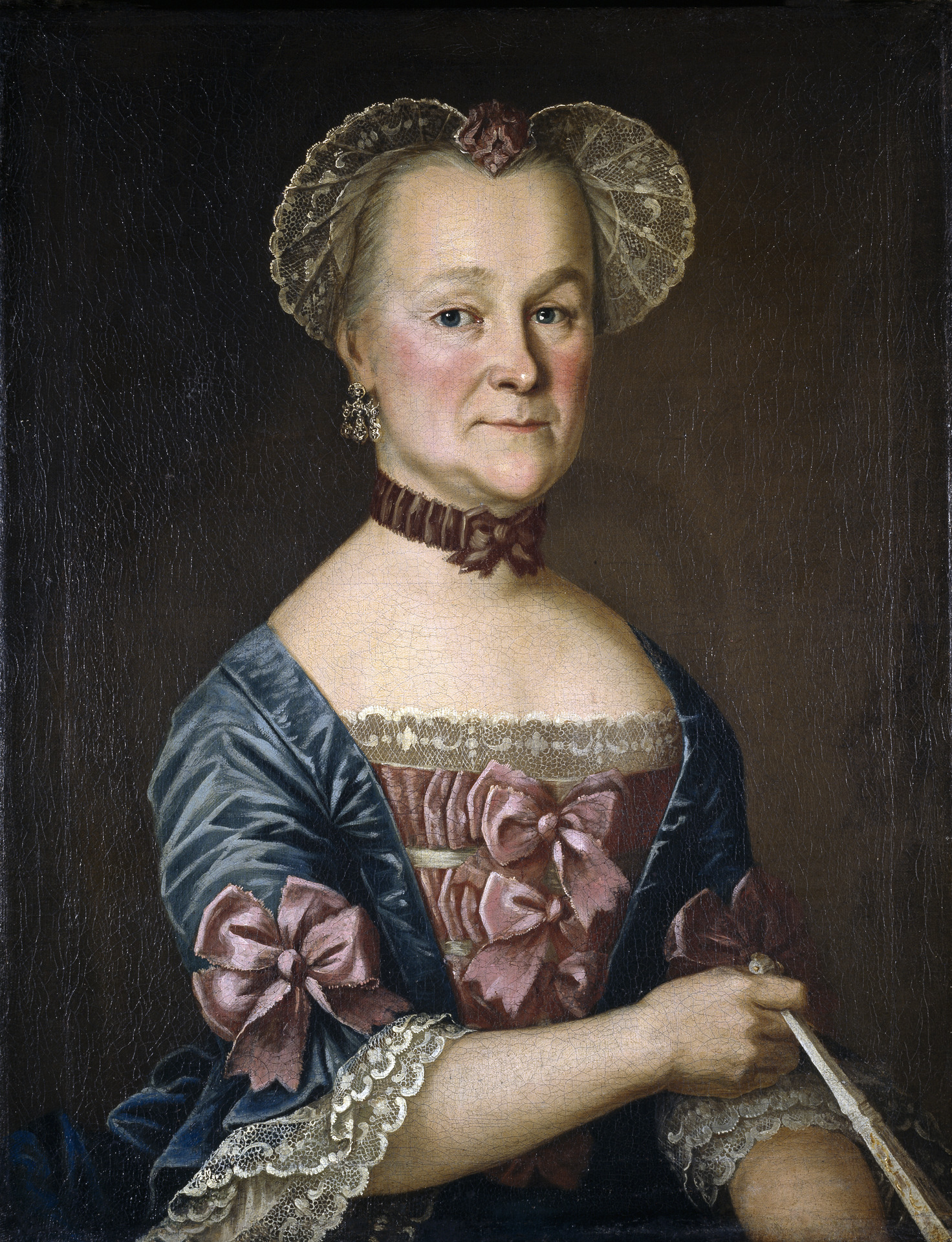
Portrait of Ulrika Bockista by Nils Schillmark, 1780

Nils Schillmark (26 September 1745 – 28 January 1804) was a Swedish painter who lived and worked in the part of Sweden that later would be Finland.

Schillmark was born in Skellefteå as the youngest son in a farmer's family. He initially studied in Stockholm and then moved to Sveaborg (Suomenlinna) in the eastern part of Sweden (now Finland) in 1773. He painted portraits, still lifes, and landscapes, particularly river landscapes. Schillmark along with Isak Wacklin were early Finnish landscape painters. He also painted nature works similar to the Von Wright brothers, such as hunting and fishing scenes. In Helsinki he painted portraits of officers and non-socialists. In 1776 he traveled and worked in Loviisa and Heinola, eventually settling at the provincial governor's residence in Kymenkartano. In 1782 he painted portraits of the bishop of Porvoo and a merchant and his wife in Loviisa. Some of his works can be found at the Ateneum and the City Museum of Heinola. He died in Loviisa.
