= Johannes Nevala =

Finnish artist (born 1966)

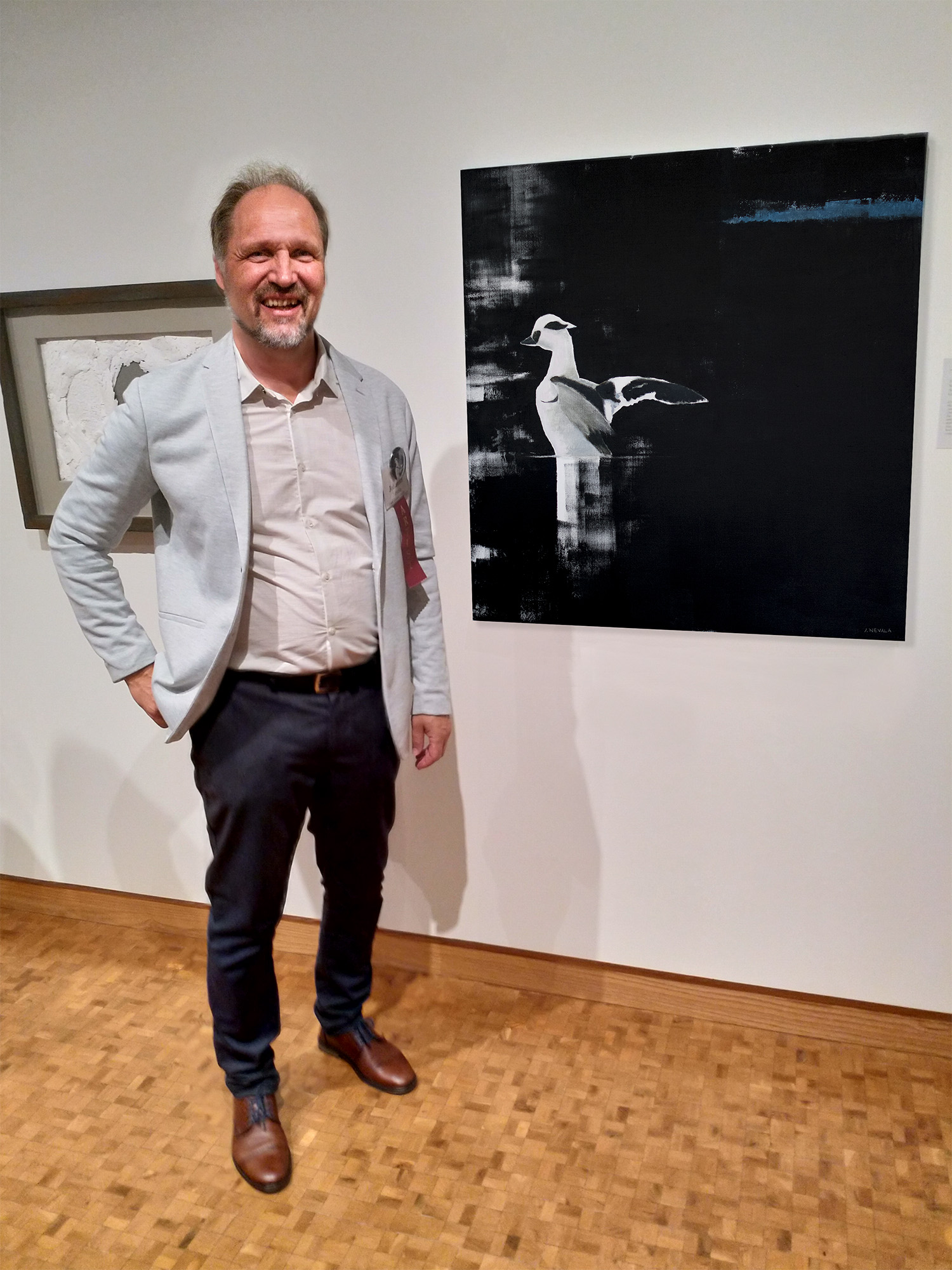
Johannes Nevala at his painting Blueline. Leigh Yawkey Woodson Art Museum, 2019.

Johannes Nevala, born 1966 in Finland, is an artist who paints birds, especially on the seashore where he captures the birds in oils, watercolors and other techniques. His art is inspired by the Nordic light and the artists von Wright, Bruno Liljefors, Gunnar Brusewitz and Lars Jonsson, who specialized in nature and birds.

== Exhibitions ==
Nevala debuted in 1993 with a watercolor exhibition on Gotland. In 1998, Nevala showed an exhibition, Birds in Light, at Galleri Ridelius in Visby. This exhibition, which included both watercolors and oil paintings, shaped his artistry since then. Nevala has participated in several international exhibitions. In 2003, he became one of the first artists from the Nordic countries, and the first from Finland to be accepted into the Birds in Art exhibition, organized by the Leigh Yawkey Woodson Art Museum. The following year he participated in the exhibition IV Centuries of Birds, organized by Clarke Galleries, which was held in several places, including in New York City, Stowe, and Palm Beach. This was followed by exhibitions at Mall Galleries, London and Kunsthuis van het Oosten, the Netherlands. 2011 he held a major exhibition at Tobaksmagasinet, Jakobstads Museum, in Finland. This was followed by other exhibitions in Finland; Luontotalo Arkki, Satakunnan Museum; Galleri Karaija, Inkoo and Gumbostrand konst & form, Sibbo. In 2021 he returned for the 10th time to Woodson Art Museum's Birds in Art with his work Persona. The painting was selected for display at the following art venues in the US:

- Newington-Cropsey Foundation, New York (2022).
- Arizona-Sonora Desert Museum, Tucson, Arizona (2022).
- Bozeman Art Museum, Montana (2022).
- Rockport Center for the Arts, Texas (2023).
