= Tyko Sallinen =

Finnish painter (1879–1955)

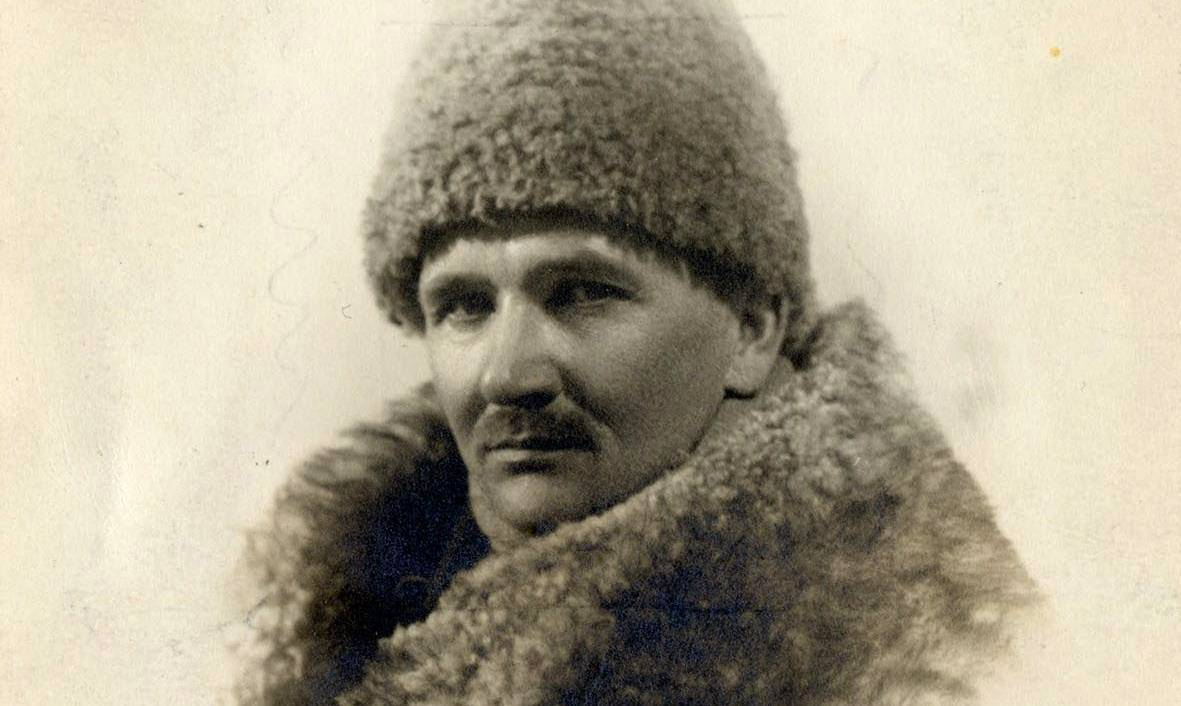
- Born: March 14, 1879; Nurmes
- Died: September 18, 1955 (aged 76); Helsinki
- Style: expressionism

Tyko Konstantin Sallinen (March 14, 1879 in Nurmes – September 18, 1955 in Helsinki) was a Finnish expressionism style painter.

In late 1916 Sallinen became a founder member of the November Group, which was a Finnish group of expressionists and cubists.

== Life ==
Tyko's parents were tailor Antti Sallinen and Johanna Sallinen. He spent his childhood in Haparanda. The family was strictly committed to Laestadianism. Sallinen ran away from home in age of 14, and supported himself as taylor journeyman.

Sallinen was married twice. His first wife Helmi Vartiainen ("Mirri") was the model of many of Sallinen's early paintings in style of fauvism. They were married 1909-1916 and got two daughters, Eva and Taju. Taju lived with her father after her parents' divorce. As an adult she became an author and wrote about her father. Sallinen married Katarina Tschepurnoff in 1924, and they got a daughter, Tirsi, in 1928.

== Style ==
Sallinen was one of the first Finnish Modernists to emphasise the power of emotion and the importance of individuality. He became the most visible member of the younger generation who depicted the Finnish landscape and people with unprecedented candour.

== Works ==
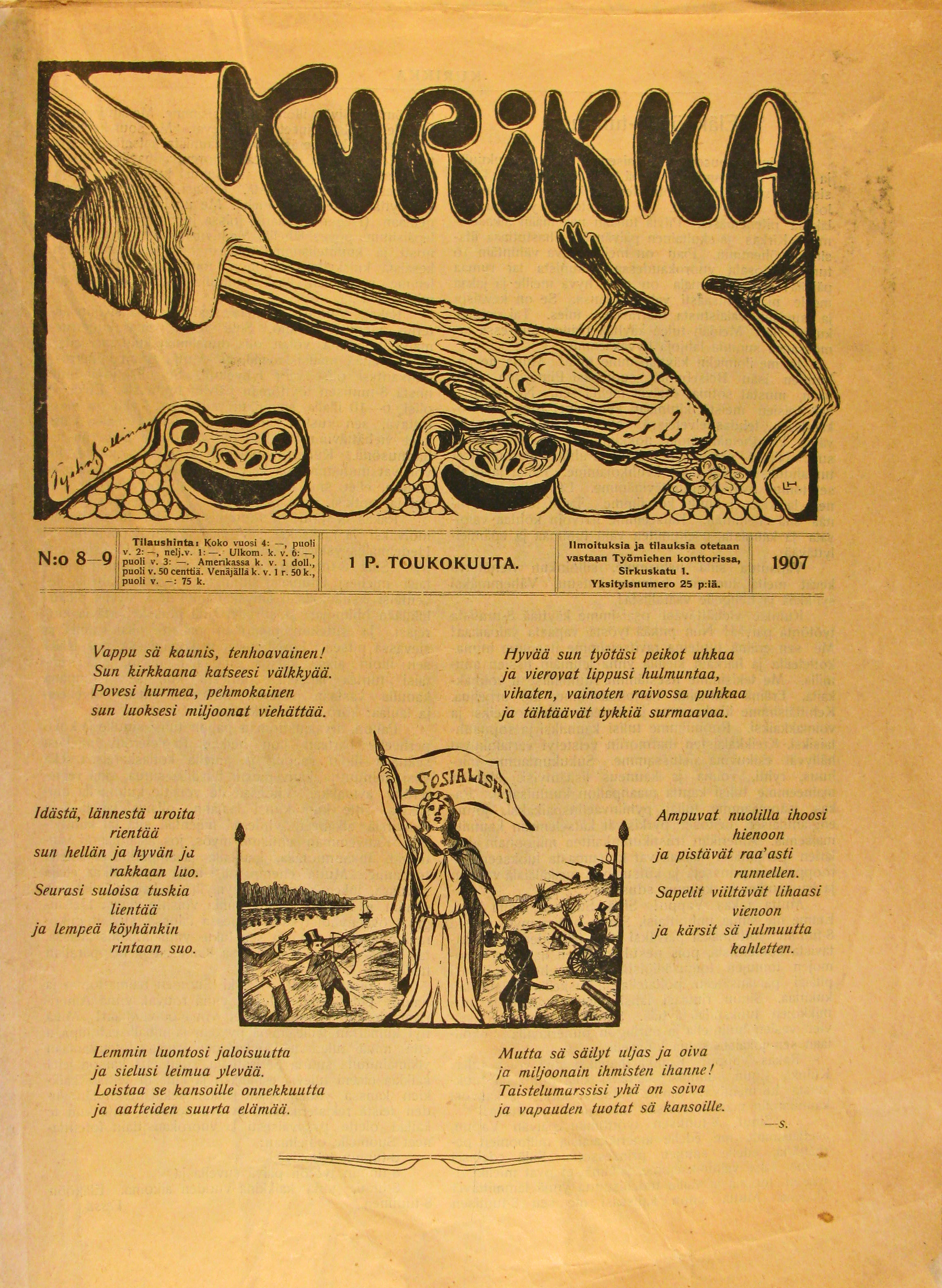
Journal Paddle 1907, issue 8–9.

- The Nude (Alaston, 1910)
- Nude (Alaston, 1911)
- Mirri in Black (Mirri mustassa puvussa, 1911)
- The Washerwomen (Pyykkärit, 1911)
- Early Spring (Kevättalvi, 1914)
- Self-Portrait (Omakuva, 1914)
- The "Ducat" Girl (Tukaattityttö, 1914)
- Ruokokoski Painting (Ruokokoski maalaa, 1916)
- The Tradesman's Daughters (Kauppiaan tyttäret, 1917)
- Kilpajuoksu, 1917
- Puunhakkaaja, 1917
- Rouva Kallion muotokuva, 1917
- Vådö, 1917
- The Fanatics' or The Religious Fanatics (Hihhulit, 1918)
- The Barn Dance (Jytkyt, 1918)
- Study for The Fight III (Tutkielma Tappeluun III, 1920)
