= List of Finnish women artists =

This is a list of women artists who were born in Finland or whose artworks are closely associated with that country.

== A ==
- Erna Aaltonen (born 1951), ceramist
- Eva Acke (1855–1929), painter
- Nina Ahlstedt (1853–1907), painter
- Claire Aho (1925-2015), photographer
- Eija-Liisa Ahtila (born 1959), photographer, video artist
- Miina Äkkijyrkkä (born 1949), painter, sculptor
- Helena Arnell (1697–1751), painter

== B ==
- Edla Blommér (1817–1908), painter
- Heidi Blomstedt (1911–1982), ceramist
- Elina Brotherus (born 1972), photographer and video artist
- Rut Bryk (1916–1999), ceramist

== C ==
- Margareta Capsia (1682–1759), painter
- Fanny Churberg (1845–1892), landscape painter

== D ==
- Elin Danielson-Gambogi (1861–1919), painter

== E ==
- Anna Eriksson (born 1977), filmmaker

== F ==
- Ellen Favorin (1853–1919), painter
- Hilda Flodin (1877–1958), sculptor, etcher and painter
- Alina Forsman (1845–1899), sculptor
- Alexandra Frosterus-Såltin (1837–1916), painter, illustrator

== G ==
- Viola Gråsten (1910–1994), textile designer

== H ==
- Greta Hällfors-Sipilä (1899–1974), painter
- Liisa Hallamaa (1925–2008), ceramist
- Nanna Hänninen (born 1973), photographic artist
- Ilona Harima (1911–1986), painter
- Helena Hietanen (born 1963), textile artist
- Eila Hiltunen (1922–2003), sculptor
- Sasha Huber (born 1975), contemporary artist
- Tuuli Hypén (born 1983), cartoonist

== J ==
- Tove Jansson (1914–2001), painter, illustrator, cartoonist

== K ==
- Meeri Koutaniemi (born 1987), photographer and journalist
- Sinikka Kurkinen (born 1935), painter

== L ==
- Gun Lanciai (1920–2013), sculptor
- Kaisa Leka (born 1978), cartoonist, politician
- Rakel Liekki (born 1979), filmmaker, journalist and writer
- Heljä Liukko-Sundström (1938–2024), ceramic artist and writer
- Marita Liulia (born 1957), media artist
- Sirkka-Liisa Lonka (born 1943), painter, graphic artist
- Amélie Lundahl (1850–1914), painter
- Leena Luostarinen (1949–2013), painter
- Kiba Lumberg (born 1956), artist, writer

== M ==
- Tea Mäkipää (born 1973), contemporary artist
- Charlotta Malm-Reuterholm (1768–1845), painter, writer
- Totte Mannes (born 1933), painter
- Marjatta Metsovaara (1927–2014), textile artist
- Marja Mikkonen (born 1979), filmmaker
- Helvi Mustonen (1947–2025), painter

== N ==
- Elena Näsänen (born 1968), visual artist working with film and video installations
- Elin Alfhild Nordlund (1861–1941), painter
- Gunnel Nyman (1909–1948), glass and metal artist

== P ==
- Outi Pieski (born 1973), Sámi visual artist
- Tuulikki Pietilä (1917–2009), graphic artist
- Ulla Procopé (1921–1968), ceramist
- Laila Pullinen (1933–2015), artist, sculptor
- Ritva Puotila (born 1935), artist, textile designer

== R ==
- Essi Renvall (1911–1979), sculptor
- Diana Ringo (born 1992), filmmaker, visual artist
- Nastja Säde Rönkkö (born 1985), performance artist
- Hanna Rönnberg (1862–1946), painter and writer
- Mathilda Rotkirch (1813–1842), painter
- Johanna Rytkölä (born 1956), sculptor, ceramic artist

== S ==
- Nina Sailo (1906–1998), sculptor
- Sigrid Schauman (1877–1979), artist, art critic
- Helene Schjerfbeck (1862–1946), painter
- Ida Silfverberg (1834–1899), painter
- Helmi Sjöstrand (1864–1957), painter
- Anita Snellman (1924–2006), painter
- Venny Soldan-Brofeldt (1863–1945), painter, illustrator, graphic artist and jewellery designer
- Minna Sundberg (born 1990), illustrator, cartoonist

== T ==
- Marjatta Tapiola (born 1951), painter
- Sophie Taxell (1911–1996), painter
- Ellen Thesleff (1869–1954), expressionist painter
- Hilkka Toivola (1909–2002), stained-glass artist
- Salla Tykkä (born 1973), video artist
- Katja Tukiainen (born 1969), painter, comics artist

== V ==
- Marja Vallila (1950–2018), sculptor

== W ==
- Dora Wahlroos (1870–1947), painter
- Martta Wendelin (1893–1986), painter
- Helena Westermarck (1857–1938), painter, writer
- Maria Wiik (1853–1928), painter
- Maria Wolfram (born 1961), painter and installation artist

== Z ==
- Margaretha Zetterberg (1773–1803), textile and crafts artist
