= Hänninen =

Hänninen is a Finnish surname. Notable people with the surname include:

- Elina Hänninen, Finnish figure skater
- Hannu-Pekka Hänninen (born 1952), Finnish sports commentator
- Harri Hänninen (born 1963), Finnish long-distance runner
- Janne Hänninen (born 1975), Finnish short track speedskater
- Juho Hänninen (born 1981), Finnish rally driver
- Kauko Hänninen (1930–2013), Finnish rower
- Kirsi Hänninen (born 1976), Finnish ice hockey player
- Nanna Hänninen (born 1973), photographic artist
- Olavi Hänninen (1920–1992), Finnish designer
- Osmo Hänninen (born 1939), Finnish scientist and physiologist
- Veikko Hänninen (1929–1981), Finnish chess master and writer
