= Nils Segerstråle =

Swedish-speaking Finnish military officer, chief executive and author (1893–1979)

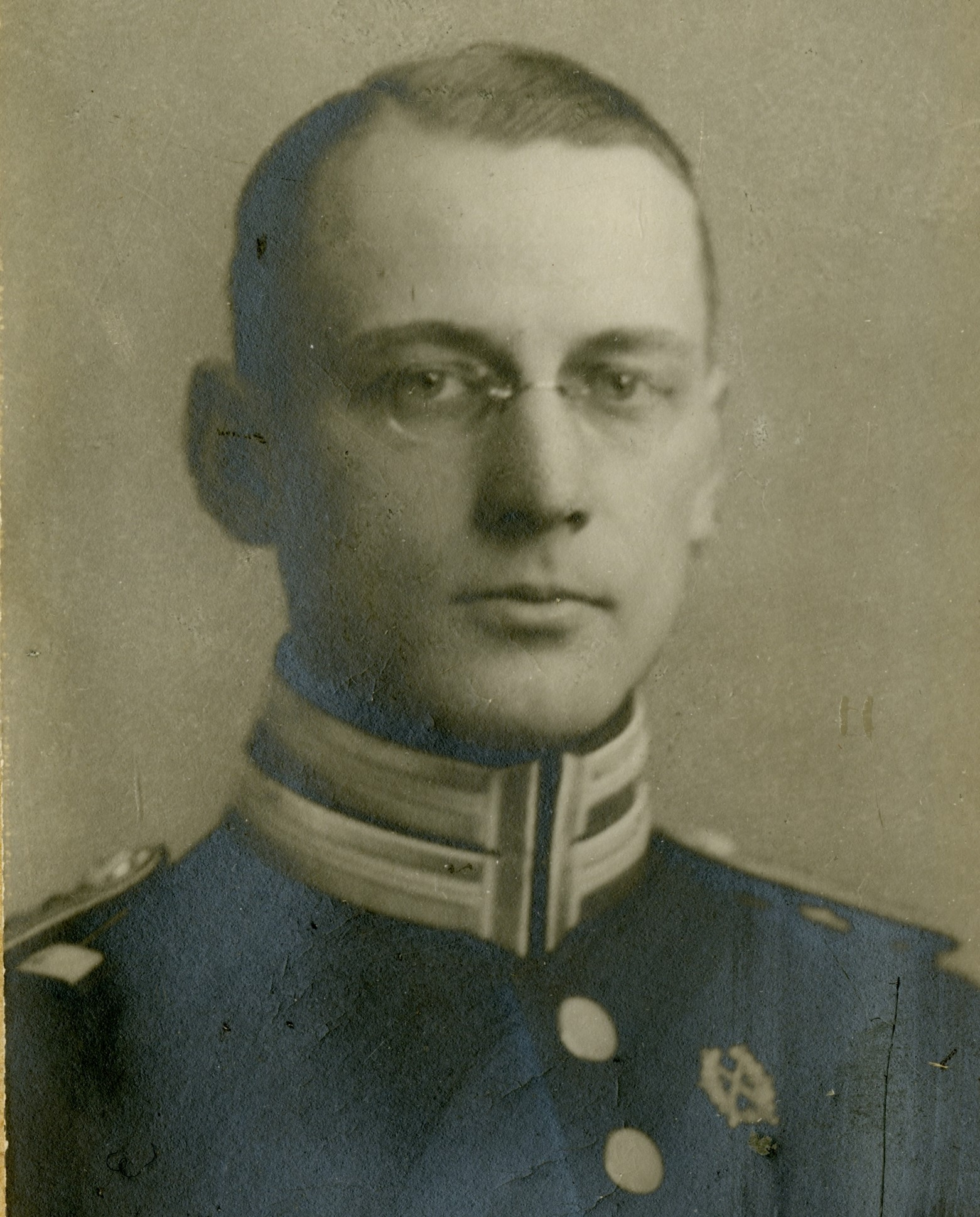
- Photograph c. 1914–1924
- Born: Nils Georg Casper Segerstråle; 31 May 1893; Turku, Finland
- Died: 20 September 1979 (aged 86); Stockholm, Sweden
- Occupations: Military officer, author
- Spouse(s): Ebba Disa Tora Funck Greta Hamilton (m. 1952) Ebba Bonde af Björnö; Anna Ebba Lætitia Tisell
- Children: 3
- Relatives: Lennart Segerstråle (cousin); Solveig von Schoultz (cousin)

Nils Georg Casper Segerstråle (31 May 1893 – 20 September 1979) was a Finnish-born Swedish military officer, chief executive, and author.

== Early life ==
Nils was born into the noble Segerstråle family in Turku, Finland, on 31 May 1893. He was the son of vice district judge (vice häradshövding) Georg Segerstråle and his wife, Karin Tawaststierna. His brothers were military officer and business executive Torsten Segerstråle (1889–1946) and lawyer Carl-Georg Segerstråle (1900–1988). He was a cousin of painter and graphic artist Lennart Segerstråle and writer and teacher Solveig von Schoultz.

== Career ==
While serving in the military, Segerstråle was commissioned as a underlöjtnant in the Göta Life Guards (I 2) in 1914 and promoted to lieutenant in 1917 and captain in 1929. He served as a military attaché in Helsinki from 1920 to 1922 and as an adjutant at the Swedish Infantry Gunnery School from 1924 to 1925. From 1933, he was the chief executive officer of Stockholmshus AB. In 1954, he became a board member of the Stockholm City Fire Insurance Office.

Throughout his lifetime, he published several notable works, including Hamiltonian Castles and Manors of Sweden (1976) and Swedish Entitled Estates (1979).

== Personal life ==
In 1952, Segerstråle married Countess Greta Hamilton (born 1903), the daughter of Lieutenant Colonel Count John Hamilton and Vera Berg von Linde. He had three children from his first marriage: Margareta (born 1917), Ebba (born 1919), and Elisabeth (born 1919).

== Awards and decorations ==
- (Sweden) Knight of the Order of the Sword
- Knight 1st Class of the Order of the White Rose of Finland
- (Finland) Cross of Merit of the Finnish Civil Guard
- (Sweden) Army Shooting Medal (SkytteM)

== Publications ==
- Bondeska slott och gårdar genom tiderna [Castles and Manors of Bonde Through the Ages] (1947)
- Hamiltonska slott och gårdar i Sverige [Hamiltonian Castles and Manors of Sweden] (1976)
- Svenska fideikommiss [Swedish Entitled Estates] (1979)
