= Ritva (given name) =

Ritva is a Finnish female given name.

== People with the given name Ritva ==
- Ritva Hannele Lauri (born 1952), Finnish actress
- Ritva Lemettinen-Melender (born 1960), Finnish long-distance runner
- Ritva Puotila (born 1935), Finnish textile designer, artist

== See also ==
- Ritva (disambiguation)
