= Segerstråle =

Segerstråle is a surname. Notable people with the surname include:

- Lennart Segerstråle (1892–1975), Finnish painter
- Martin Segerstråle (born 1984), Finnish music director
- Nils Segerstråle (1893–1979), Finnish military officer and writer
- Ullica Segerstråle (born 1945), Finnish sociologist of science

== See also ==
- Hanna Frosterus-Segerstråle, Finnish artist
