= Puotila =

Puotila may refer to:

- Puotila, Helsinki, a neighborhood
- Puotila metro station, a Helsinki Metro station

== People with the surname Puotila ==
- Jukka Puotila (born 1955), Finnish actor
- Ritva Puotila (born 1935), Finnish textile designer and artist
