= Taxell =

Taxell is a surname. Notable people with the surname include:

- Christoffer Taxell (born 1948), Finland Swedish politician and business leader
- Lars Erik Taxell (1913–2013), Finnish legal scholar and politician
- Sophie Taxell (1911–1986), Finnish painter
