= Marjatta Metsovaara =

Finnish textile artist (1927–2014)

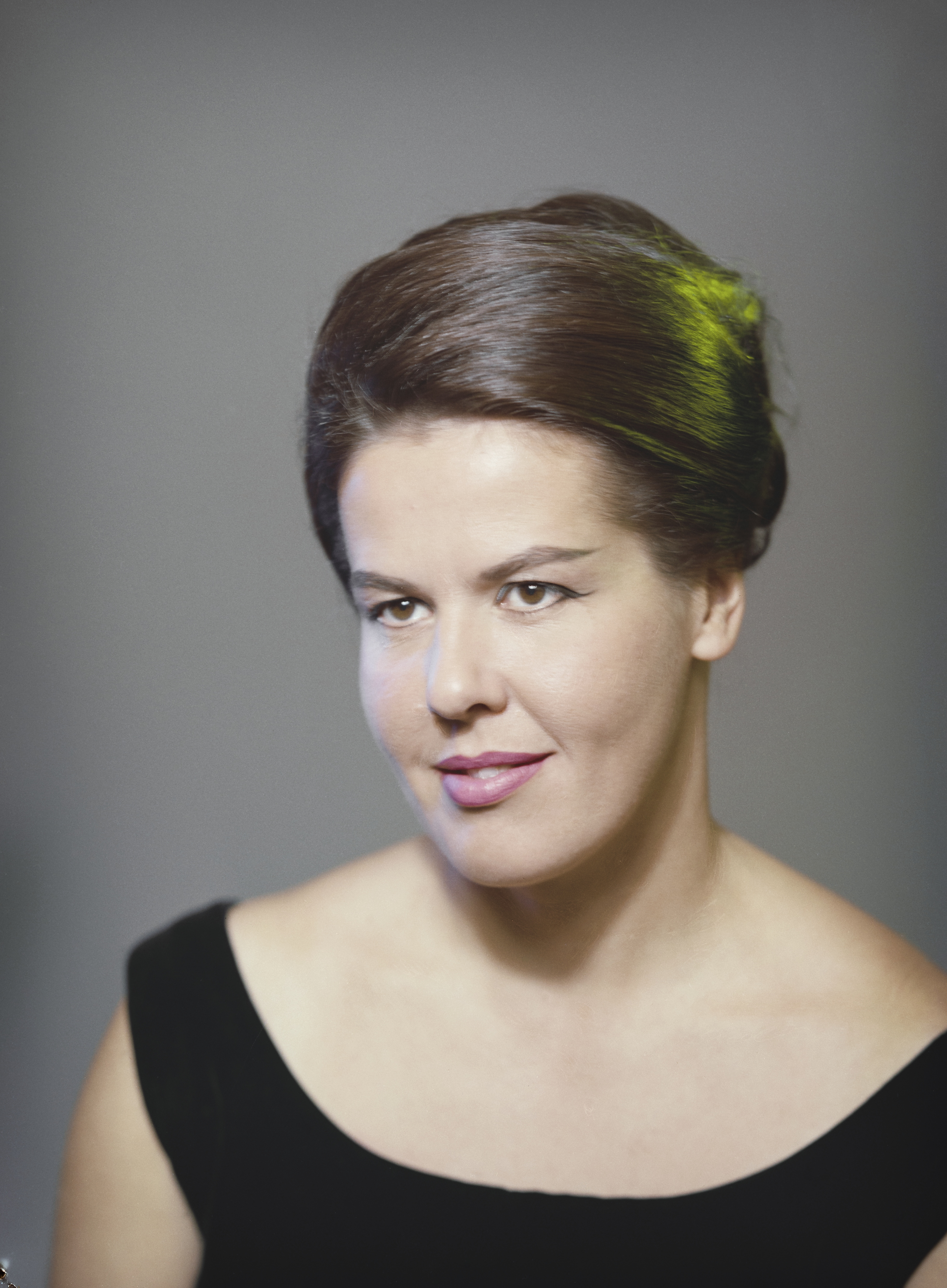
Marjatta Metsovaara (1963)

Marjatta Metsovaara (29 November 1927 – 11 December 2014) was a Finnish textile artist. After graduating from the Finnish School of Art and Design in 1949, she went on to design colourful printed and woven fabrics for a variety of textile producers in Finland and beyond. Based in Urala, she established her own weaving factory Metsovaara Oy which she ran until 1980. In parallel, with her second husband Albert Van Havere she developed a weaving mill in Sint-Niklaas, Belgium, where fabrics were produced for the furniture industry. Her creations included fashion fabrics, upholstery, table cloths, carpets and curtains. In 1970 Metsovaara was honoured with the Pro Finlandia Medal.

== Early life and family ==
Born on 29 November 1927 in Turku, Marjatta Metsovaara was the daughter of the industrialist Aleksander Metsovaara (1890–1959) and his American-born wife Milja née Peltonen (1903–1990). The family moved to Urjala in the 1930s, where her father ran a textile factory. After attending the girls' school in Tampere, she studied textile design at the Finnish School of Art and Design in Helsinki, graduating in 1949. In 1947, she married Kaj Erik Gunnar Nyström, with whom she had a son and a daughter. The marriage was dissolved in 1965. In 1966 she married the Belgian Albert Van Havere with whom she had two children.

== Career ==
On graduating in 1949, Metsovaara first worked in her father's factory which produced carpets. In 1954, she founded her own company Metsovaara Oy with a weaving mill in Urjala, first serving as artistic director and later as CEO. She created designs for a number of companies, both in Finland and abroad. Her designs for printed and woven textiles ranged from vividly coloured creations to more neutral work. She is remembered in particular for her frequently vividly coloured furnishing fabrics, sometimes produced in coordinated series. They included a variety of fabrics from flat weaves to tweeds or jacquards. Patterns could be abstract or floral, as in her 1967 Primavera range. From 1966, after her second marriage, Metsovaara lived in Belgium where she ran the Van Havere factory.

Marjatta Metsovaara died in Italy on 11 December 2014.

== Awards ==
In 1960, Metsovaaran received a gold medal at the Milan Triennial XII and in 1970 she was honoured with the Pro Finlandia Medal.
