= Pekka Sassi =

Finnish media artist (born 1969)

Pekka Sassi (born 1969) is a Finnish media artist whose works include dozens of experimental sound and video pieces, short films, installations and music.

Pekka Sassi studied in the Department of Time and Space-based Art at the Academy of Fine Arts, Helsinki, receiving a master's degree in 2000. He has additionally studied at the Slade School of Fine Art in London. He lives and works in Helsinki, Finland, and is married to the Finnish visual artist Elena Näsänen.

In 1995 Pekka Sassi received the Ducat Prize, the oldest art award in Finland, presented annually by the Finnish Art Society to a young artist in recognition of special merit. At the Tampere film festival of 2000 he was awarded as the most promising young artist of the year. In 2006 he received the AVEK award, the most significant recognition for media art in Finland. In 2010 at the 23rd European Media Art Festival in Osnabrück, Germany, he received the EMAF Award for a trend-setting work in media art for the experimental film "The Suburb Within." The jury found the piece "refreshingly minimalistic, but with an extraordinary sense of humor". "The Suburb Within" (2009) was seen to stand out from the usual flood of images while not leaving out "classic narration or a well-structured setup."

In 2020 Pekka Sassi was awarded the Maire Gullichsen Prize for contemporary art. The Prize Committee said in its statement:

"Sassi is a versatile artist, who has been making art in an avant-garde spirit for twenty years. Experimental moving images and sound form the core of his art. Sassi has an ability to condense his observations into unadorned fragments that contain multifaceted layers which hint at different meanings and times."

== A varied body of work ==
Pekka Sassi has been considered one of the most notable Finnish creators of experimental film and media art of his generation.

Pekka Sassi has been described as being "a wide-ranging, yet uncompromising artist". His working method involves traits of collage or bricolage. He constantly produces music and collects all kinds of images and sounds, integrating self-produced material and found footage to create sound pieces and audio installations or videos that combine sound with moving image. For him, "sound is half of the film/video or maybe even more." He limits the amount of image material and tries to use just the basic effects: cut, dissolve, brightness, contrast. Structurally, Sassi's works are "simple and vibrant".

"When examined separately, the structure of the video track and sound is often very simple. But glued together by Sassi, these elements generate a magic, cathartic experience in the viewer – as if rock lyrics found just the right melody."

Pekka Sassi’s works range from short films that tell a story to strictly abstract pieces. According to him the two facets of his work – the story, the narrative and the non-story, the abstraction – act as a counterbalance to each other.

=== Scripted stories ===
Some of Pekka Sassi's works take the form of scripted stories that range from dystopian horror films to small comic impressions of the everyday.

"Sassi does not actually describe the world but reconstitutes fragmented images into basic narratives accompanied by his commentary – serious and sometimes even fervent, however, often laced with irony." "Pekka Sassi's films show viewers ordinary surroundings that open up into self-contained universes which exist within and parallel to the real world. His subtly humorous stories often deal with the relationship between an individual and his surroundings."

For example, the "Kolya saga", screened at the AAVE festival (Alternative AudioVisual Event) of 2016 in Helsinki, Finland, consists of loosely connected experimental films that address deep themes with a surreal twist. "Kolya and I" (2006) is a black comedy about the relationship between human and God. In "Bad News from Heaven" (2007), the "metaphysical hooligans" Kolya and Yuri are faced with the concept of heaven. "The Suburb Within" (2009) is, according to Sassi, about "communication, narration and presence". It is also a horror film where escalating anguish is created through the soundtrack while the abstract image has a supporting role.

The fourth film of the series, "After Everything" (2014) emphasises visual narrative and is long (28 minutes) compared with Sassi's usually very short videos. The film was produced with support from the Finnish Film Foundation and premiered at the Tampere film festival of 2014. "After Everything" shows a dystopian world where brutality and inhumanity are part of everyday routine. The atmosphere of doom is emphasised by the combination of black and white footage, harsh settings and industrial noise music.

Sassi taps into the conventions and phenomena of contemporary media culture and moves beyond. "Sassi's moving images work like modern poetry or jazz; flirting with existing, recognizable structures and genres – and simultaneously constructing something new in an intuitive way."

The approach is explicit in "The Dead House" (2003), a horror film constructed following the clichés of the genre but shot in a dollhouse. According to Sassi, "The Dead House" is a "make-believe movie." In another piece of work, "It's All Around Us Now, Frank" (2006), a Western created in the spirit of Twin Peaks and emphasising narrative through sound, two male characters are forced to face the unknown and their own fears.

=== Abstract moving image ===
A parallel strand in Sassi's work combines optical, kinetic and constructivist art with the tradition of abstract experimental film. Some of his works show creative integration of simple, and sometimes random, auditory and visual elements detected in the surrounding world. In a series of experimental films called "Domestic Studies in Cosmology" a new planet is discovered at the bottom of a paper coffee cup ("Void", 2004), a seagull circling around a pier creates a new galaxy ("Bird", 2004) and a black hole is found pulsating in a kitchen sink ("Schwarzschild Radius", 2004).

"Pekka Sassi builds in a meaningful way a bridge between experimental modernism and contemporary art. In a certain manner, he is a formalist whose roots go back to the early days of experimental film in the beginning of the last century, but at the same time he is a filmmaker who reacts to the present and its themes and who puts together his material out of the congestion on offer."

In "A Friend" (2016) an explicitly kinetic and constructivist work, the moving image is composed of black and white lines and grids. In contrast, the video installations "Colours" (2016) and "Moving Colours" (2020) are focussed on dialogue between colours, light, movement and sound.

The minimalist/constructivist work "Colours" (2016) is a video installation where large geometric surfaces changing colour are projected on three walls in a 20-minute loop accompanied by a soundscape. The work can be seen both as a painting and as moving image. Sassi explains: "I explored what happens when the element of time is integrated into the examination of an abstract painting by cropping and synchronising images by means of moving image." The immersive work has been seen to push “the traditional boundaries of concrete art towards that of a holistic and spiritual experience.”

In 2024, Pekka Sassi’s “Colours” (2016) was included in “Experiments in Concretism,” a collection exhibition of the Espoo Museum of Modern Art EMMA. Timo Valjakka, writing for Helsingin Sanomat, the leading newspaper in Finland, considered Pekka Sassi’s three-channel video installation “Colours” the most striking work in the exhibition in the sense that, while being immersive and meditative, it called to pay attention to the meticulous design.

From the meticulous shapes of constructivist art Sassi has moved towards increasingly abstract expression and intuitively variable use of colour.

Pekka Sassi's "Moving Colours" (2020) is an abstract video projection where oval surfaces slowly move and change. Afterimages in inverted colours make it difficult to determine where any given image begins or what colour it actually is. The video is accompanied by a soundscape and a series of still photos taken from the video. “Moving Colours” has been said to bring forth previously unnoticed facets at repeated viewings. Both the video projection and the series “Still Colours” have been seen to “project a sense of fleetingness and embody a host of subtleties that hinder memory recall and the accurate reproduction by use of image capture technology.”

== Festivals and exhibitions ==
Pekka Sassi’s abstract video projections Colours (2016) and Moving Colours (2020) were first shown in solo exhibitions in Galleria Heino in Helsinki. In 2024 “Colours” (2016) was included in “Experiments in Concretism,” a collection exhibition of the Espoo Museum of Modern Art EMMA. In 2023, Pekka Sassi participated in the invitational exhibition “Filaments of Image and Space” set up in Paimio Sanatorium designed by Alvar Aalto.

A retrospective of Pekka Sassi's work was shown in the Tampere Film Festival of 2014 as part of the 25 year celebratory programme of the Distribution Centre for Finnish Media Art, AV-Arkki. The retrospective screening "Messages from Pekka Sassi" included 18 experimental sound and video pieces produced in the years 1999–2009.

Pekka Sassi's works have been shown repeatedly at the Tampere Film Festival in Finland, at the International Film Festival in Rotterdam, at the International Festival of New Film in Split and at the European Media Art Festival in Osnabrück. In 2017, for example, Sassi’s films were screened both at the Stuttgarter Filmwinter (2017) and the Kassel Dokfest (2017).

Sassi's works have been screened frequently in domestic new media art events. In 2018, Sassi's works were included in two gallery exhibitions of audio art as part of the Tampere Biennale, focused on contemporary Finnish art music. Sassi's works have also been showcased in events to promote contemporary Finnish art abroad, such as an event to present experimental Finnish music in Madrid (2017) and an exhibition of Finnish media art at the International New Media Festival in Seoul (2016).

Sassi is among the artists whose works are included in the VILKE collection that brings together Finnish electronic art works created since the 1970s that were pivotal in their time. The collection, maintained by the FixC artist cooperative, was first shown in Kerava Art Museum in 2013.

== Works in collections ==
The Finnish National Gallery has Pekka Sassi's experimental films "Pass" (2014) and "The Duplicate" (2001) and also the sound installation "A lonely house on a hill" (2009), a pop music style "garage opera" comprising 14 pieces where the story presented by Sassi is accompanied by music played, recorded, mixed and mastered by Sassi.

In 2021, Pekka Sassi's video installation entitled "The Third Colour", commissioned by the State Art Commission, was deposited in the building of the National Agency for Education in Helsinki. The work consists of abstract shapes in shifting colours and is projected on opposite walls of the lobby, accompanied by an archaic soundscape.

Helsinki Art Museum holds the installations "The Balcony" (2002) and "Stories About Light" (2000, re-created in 2002). "Stories about light," inspired by a soviet recording of Yuri Gagarin speaking, found in a flea market, is about space, heroic travelling and distances between people and the planets. A nostalgic living room resembling a movie set invites the visitor to listen to recordings of stories. In one of the pieces, named "12-IV 1961", also screened as a self-standing work in various events, Youri Gagarin calls his mother from the orbit around the Earth to discuss mundane issues.
