= Gun Lanciai =

Finnish sculptor (1920–2013)

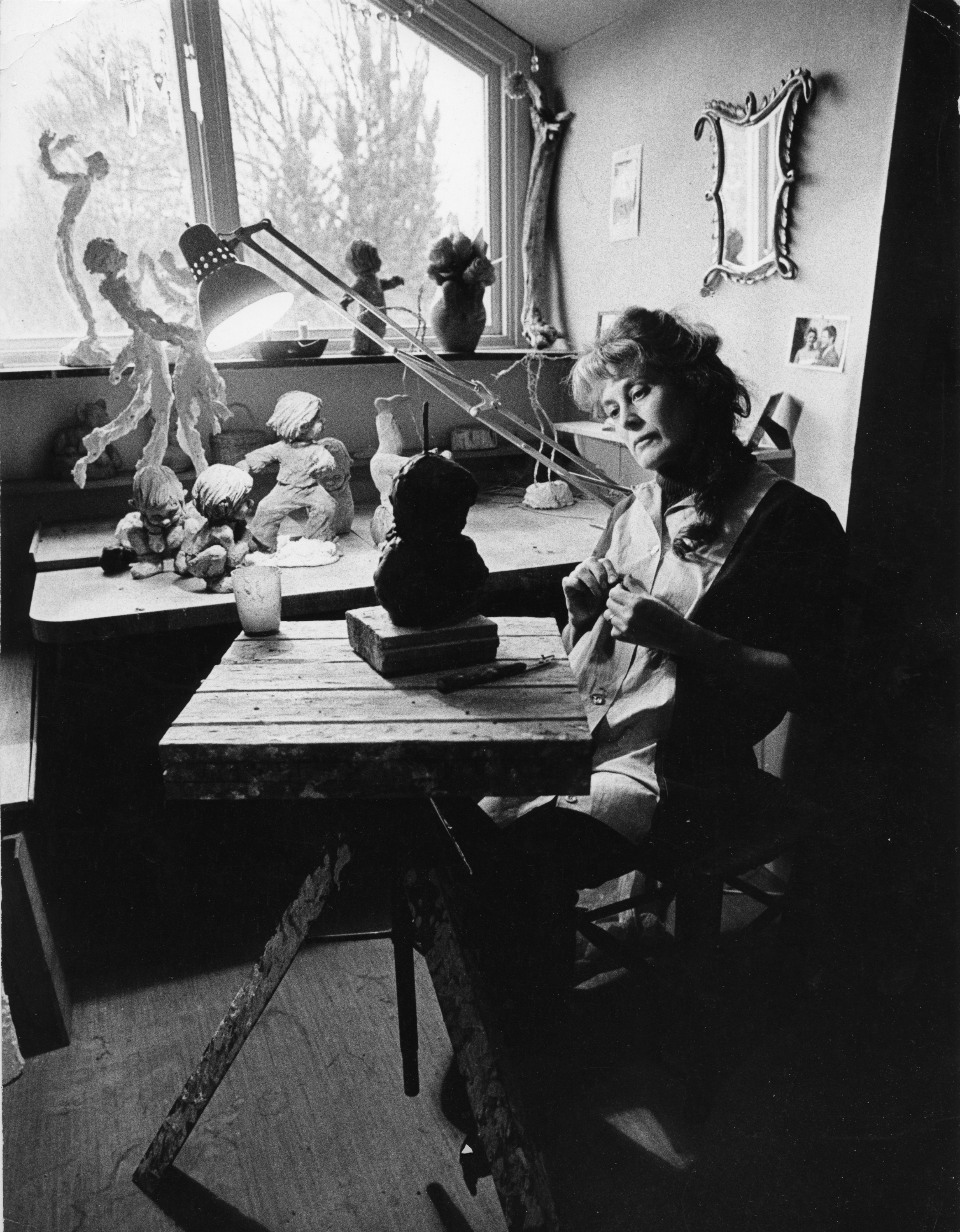
- Lanciai in her workshop in Gothenburg, 1970
- Born: Gunvor Westerberg; 10 November 1920; Borgå, Finland
- Died: 15 March 2013 (aged 92); Helsingør, Denmark

Gun Lanciai (born Gunvor Westerberg; 10 November 1920 – 15 March 2013), was a Swedish-Finnish sculptor. She was also the illustrator of the Swedish-language school book Vi på Solgård, for reading for the lower levels in Finland by the suggestion of her lifelong friend the writer Solveig von Schoultz. Gun Lanciai lived most of her life in Sweden (1955–2004), was a Finnish citizen until 1965, and from then on a Swedish citizen.

== Biography ==
Gunvor Westerberg was born on 10 November 1920, in Borgå (Porvoo), Finland. She made her first sculpture, a faun in clay at the age of 13 in 1934. She was accepted at the art academy of Ateneum in Helsinki in 1939 for further education in sculpture and ceramics, which progress was interrupted by the Winter War.

She married the half-Italian Aurelio Lanciai in 1942, Finnish junior champion in tennis, and in 1952 moved with him and four children to San Isidro in Argentine, where she found a new teacher in the sculptor Esdras Gianella (1916–2010). At the same time another Swedish sculptor lived in San Isidro, the prima ballerina of Paris Carina Ari, who left dancing at the age of 42 to instead commit herself to sculpturing.

Gun Lanciai resumed sculpturing in Gothenburg upon her return to Scandinavia in 1955 after the fall of Perón. She specialised in children's figures (terracotta), portraits in plaster, some bronze sculptures, musicians in plaster and steel wiring, sown applications and paintings.

She gave regular exhibitions from 1968 in Sweden, Finland, Canada and Denmark, in 1972 in both Finland and Canada. In 1976 she had a solo exhibition in Ottawa where she exhibited both sculptures, graphics and water colours. She moved to Stockholm with her husband in 1977 but lived her last nine years in the home of her son Michael close to Elsinore in Denmark. In 2013 she gave her last exhibition one week before her sudden death from heart failure and pneumonia on 5 March 2013 in Helsingør, Denmark.

She was the niece of the architect and artist Harry Röneholm of Finland.
