= Ritva =

Ritva may refer to:

- Yom Tov Asevilli, a medieval rabbi and rosh yeshiva of the Yeshiva of Seville (c. 1260 – 1320)
- Ritva, a Finnish female given name
- May 27, name day
