= Rovaniemi Church =

Church in Lapland, Finland

Rovaniemi Mother Church Rovaniemen kirkko
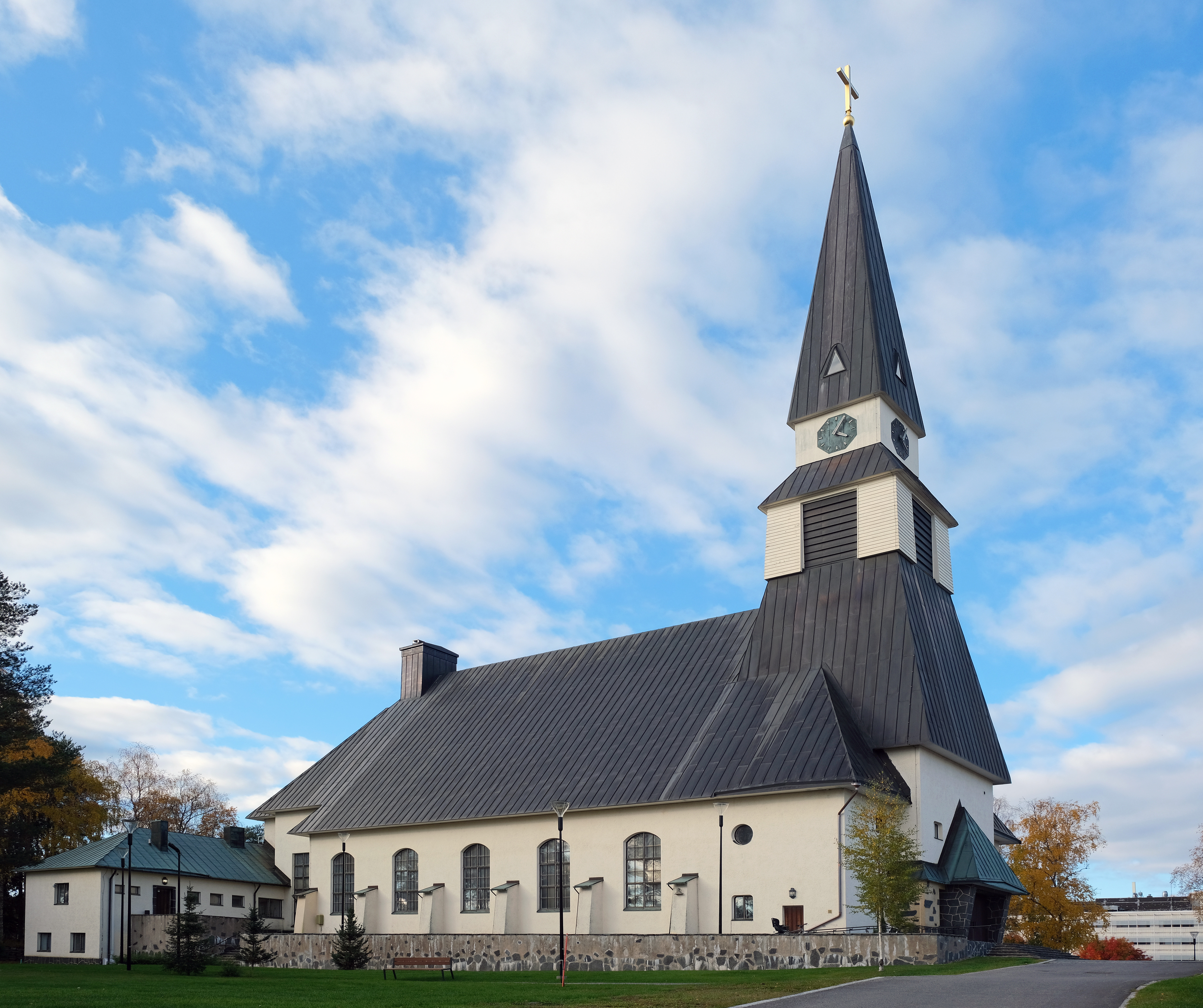

Religion
- Affiliation: Evangelical Lutheran Church of Finland
- Ecclesiastical or organizational status: Church (building)

Location
- Location: Rovaniemi, Finland
- Interactive map of Rovaniemi Mother Church; Rovaniemen kirkko
- Coordinates: 66°29′40.81″N 025°43′43.75″E

Architecture
- Architect: Bertel Liljequist
- Style: Reconstruction
- Completed: 1950

Specifications
- Capacity: 850
- Materials: Stone

The Rovaniemi Mother Church (Finnish: Rovaniemen kirkko) is a church located in the city center of Rovaniemi in Lapland, Finland. The 850-seat church, designed by architect Bertel Liljequist, was completed in 1950. The earlier church building, completed in 1817, was burnt down by the Germans during the Lapland War on October 16, 1944.

The specialties of the church include a Christian cross on the roof, which is lit with a red neon light (only visible at night). The choice of color once sparked widespread debate. The color of the cross is red because of its symbolic meaning: "Bloody Cross on top of the Promissory Note." During 2005, Rovaniemi Church was renovated. The most visible change was the renewal of the water cover made copper.

The large altar fresco (14 meters high and 11 meters wide) was made by Professor Lennart Segerstråle in 1951. The work is called Elämän lähde ("The Source of Life").
