= Bror-Erik Wallenius =

Finnish sports commentator

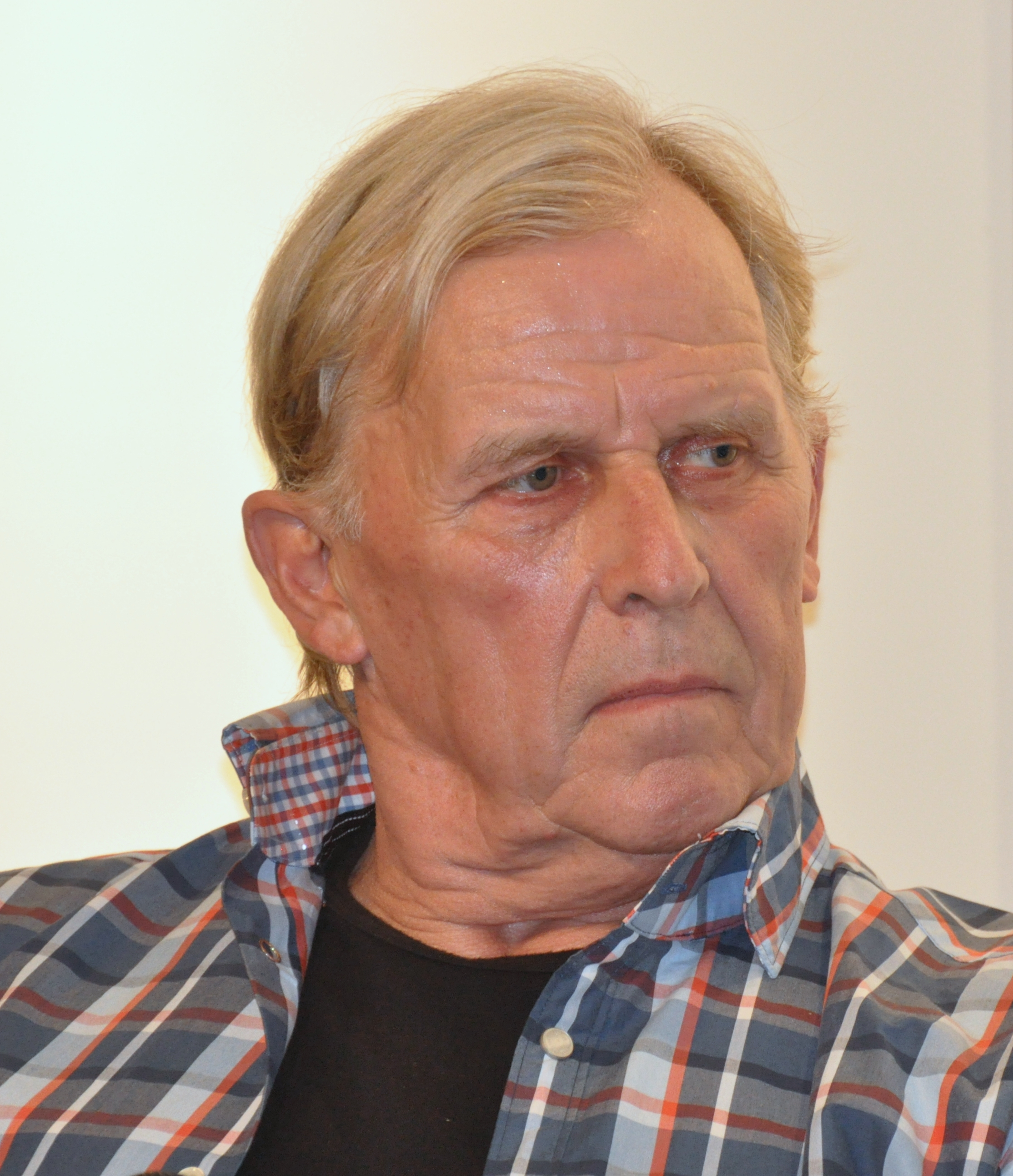
Bror-Erik Wallenius in 2011.

Bror-Erik "Bubi" Wallenius (born 1943) is a retired Finnish sports commentator who still occasionally works for Finland's National Broadcasting Company YLE.

Wallenius had a great passion for sports since his childhood. When he was a little boy he organized sports competitions in Kruununhaka, Helsinki, the neighbourhood where he lived, and collected entrance fees from the adults who came to attend. Wallenius learned to read when he was four years old, and practised speaking. He recited poetry in front of the class. In the 1960s he studied languages and social sciences in the University of Helsinki. At the end of the 1970s Wallenius got job with the Swedish sports editorial staff of YLE. Before that he had worked ten years as a salesman for IBM. Wallenius' first play-by-play sportscast was the women's 60 meters hurdles, which he watched from videotape, for radio.

In the 1980s Wallenius worked mainly in the Swedish language sports staff, but also did some newsflashes for Finnish language sports news Urheiluruutu. In Swedish he sportscasted the 1988 Winter Olympics in Calgary, among others. In the beginning of the 1990s he made a permanent move to the Finnish side of sport staff. The first sportscasts were mainly cross-country skiing competitions. Nowadays Wallenius commentates every sport. He usually commentates athletics together with Antero Mertaranta, basketball with a colour commentator (Jukka Toijala and Henrik Dettman in the 2000s), and skiing with color commentator too (Juha Mieto, Pekka Vähäsöyrinki and Kari Ristanen in the 2000s). In the skiing season 2006/2007 Wallenius himself had made a move to a colour commentator, and the main play-by-play commentator was a young Jussi Eskola. In the 1990s Wallenius also commentated ice hockey, and football so far as the second half of the 2000s. He was one of the main commentators in FIFA World Cups and UEFA European Football Championship. In the 2006 FIFA World Cup he wasn't anymore a play-by-play commentator, but had his own intermission show Bubin vaihtopenkki ("Bubi's substitution bench") where he discussed about the events in football with many celebrity guests and football personalities. "Bubi" has also commentated many other kind of sports, like strong man competitions.

The commentating style of Wallenius is very restful, genial and philosophic. This arouses many kinds of opinions among sports fans. Many people consider him a "walking sport encyclopedia", but others think he is a boring chatterer. The integral part of his style is to tell simple things in quite complex ways and fall into very deep philosophic contemplation. He has spoken up for his calm analytic style by saying that shouting should only be done in the army and by the police. Wallenius had been married twice, but has been a bachelor for the last 20 years. He retired in December 2008.
