= Urheiluruutu =

Finnish sports news show

Urheiluruutu is a daily sports news show produced and broadcast by the Finnish Broadcasting Company, Yle.

The programme originally launched on 18 August 1963. The sportsreader was Anssi Kukkonen and the programme was gathered up by Seppo Kannas. Kukkonen is also the father of the name Urheiluruutu ("sports screen") which was inspired by Swedish Sportspegeln. Before Urheiluruutu, the sports news was read in the end of normal news broadcast. In the beginning, Urheiluruutu was broadcast only once in a week: 15 minutes at Sunday evenings. Later it was broadcast also on Thursdays and Saturdays. In 1993, the daily broadcasting began.

The audiovisual appearance of Urheiluruutu has changed many times during the years, previously in February 2013. The first opening sequence from 1963 included an animated rooster, originating from a pun of Anssi Kukkonen's name ("kukko" being the Finnish word for rooster). The most well-known theme music is the Leevi and the Leavings song "Tuhannen markan seteli", used from 1983 to 1993.

Nowadays the broadcasting times of Urheiluruutu are 7:16 p.m. in YLE TV2 and 8:55 p.m. in YLE TV1 (the main broadcast). Also a short sports segment is included after the 9:50 p.m. news bulletin in YLE TV2, often clashing with the beginning of rival station MTV3's Kymmenen uutiset ("Ten O'Clock News").

== Sportreaders ==
=== Current ===
- Laura Arffman
- Antti Ennekari
- Inka Henelius
- Maija Kautto
- Kristiina Kekäläinen
- Manu Myllyaho
- Petra Manner
- Jere Nurminen
- Antti-Jussi Sipilä
- Riikka Smolander
- Riku Salminen
- Tapio Suominen

=== Former ===
- Hannu-Pekka Hänninen
- Juha Jokinen
- Niki Juusela
- Ville Klinga
- Anssi Kukkonen
- Riku Riihilahti
- Pentti Salmi
- Laura Ruohola
- Marko Terva-aho
- Bror-Erik Wallenius
