= Osmo Hänninen =

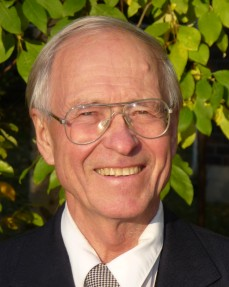
- Hänninen in 2009
- Born: Osmo Otto Päiviö Hänninen; 30 April 1939 (age 86); Lahti, Finland
- Occupation: Scientist

Osmo Otto Päiviö Hänninen (born 30 April 1939) is a Finnish scientist and physiologist, a non-fiction writer, opinion-maker, a supporter of the folk medicine, culture and a humanist. He served as rector of the University of Kuopio, 1981–1984, Vice Rector 1973-78, and was appointed to the first permanent professor post of the university as the Professor of Physiology and acted as the head of the institute 1972-2004. Hänninen also served as an adjunct professor at the University of Turku and the University of Joensuu, (1967–2004 and 1981–2004) and research professor of the Academy of Finland 1980-81.

He has published more than 400 scientific journal articles in physiology, toxicology, biochemistry, sports medicine, environmental sciences and pharmacology and numerous textbooks and books of cultural history in Finnish, English, Swedish and Estonian. He is also the current editor-in-chief of the journal Pathophysiology, and was also the president of the 3rd International Congress on Pathophysiology. The most noteworthy of the text books is the one on human physiology and anatomy (in Finnish), which in 2014 becomes the oldest continuously used textbook in Finland. In 2009 he won the Finnish Association of Non-fiction Writers's price for textbook writers.
