= Tuuli Hypén =

Finnish comics artist (born 1983)

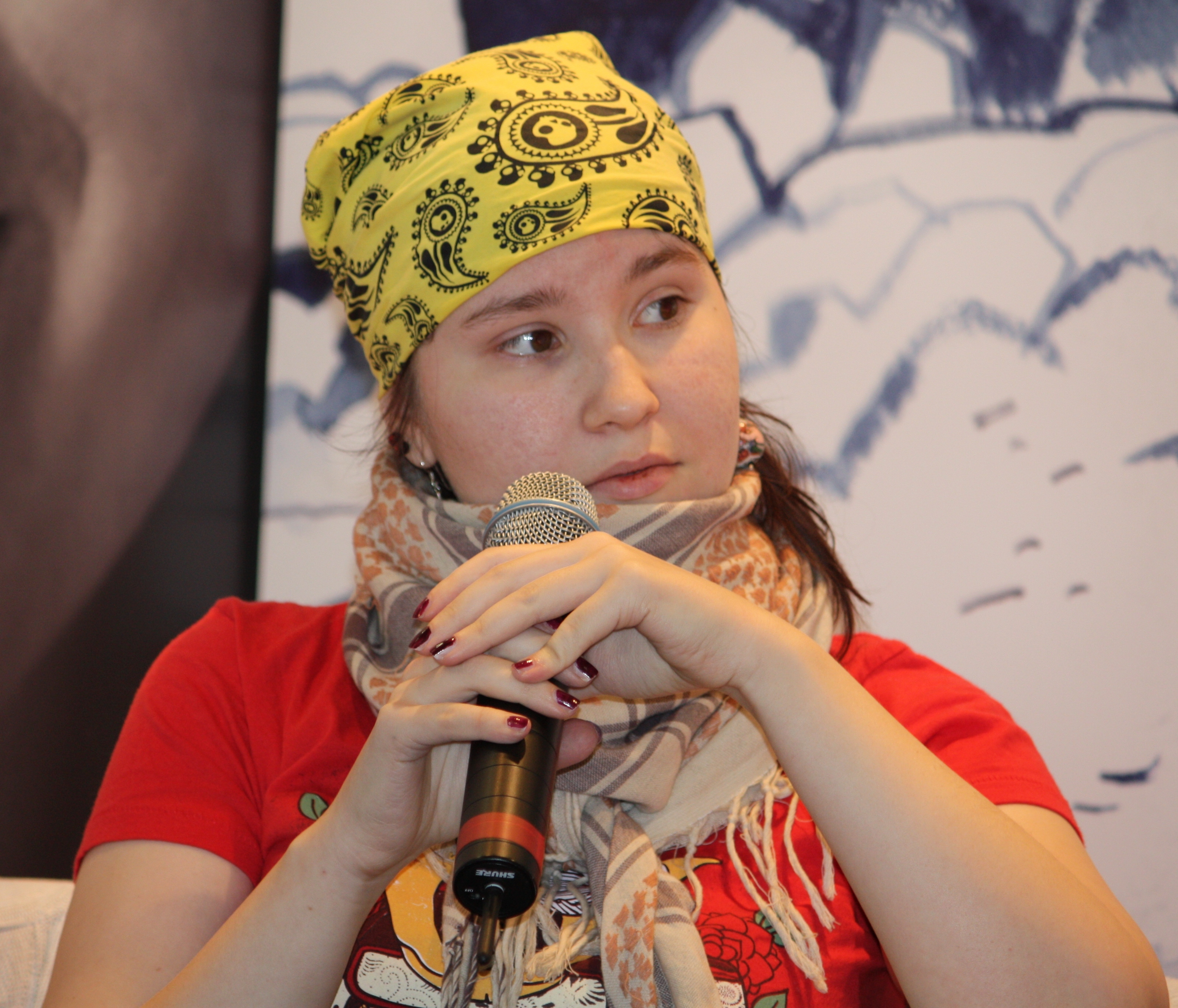
Tuuli Hypén at Helsinki Book Fair, 2011

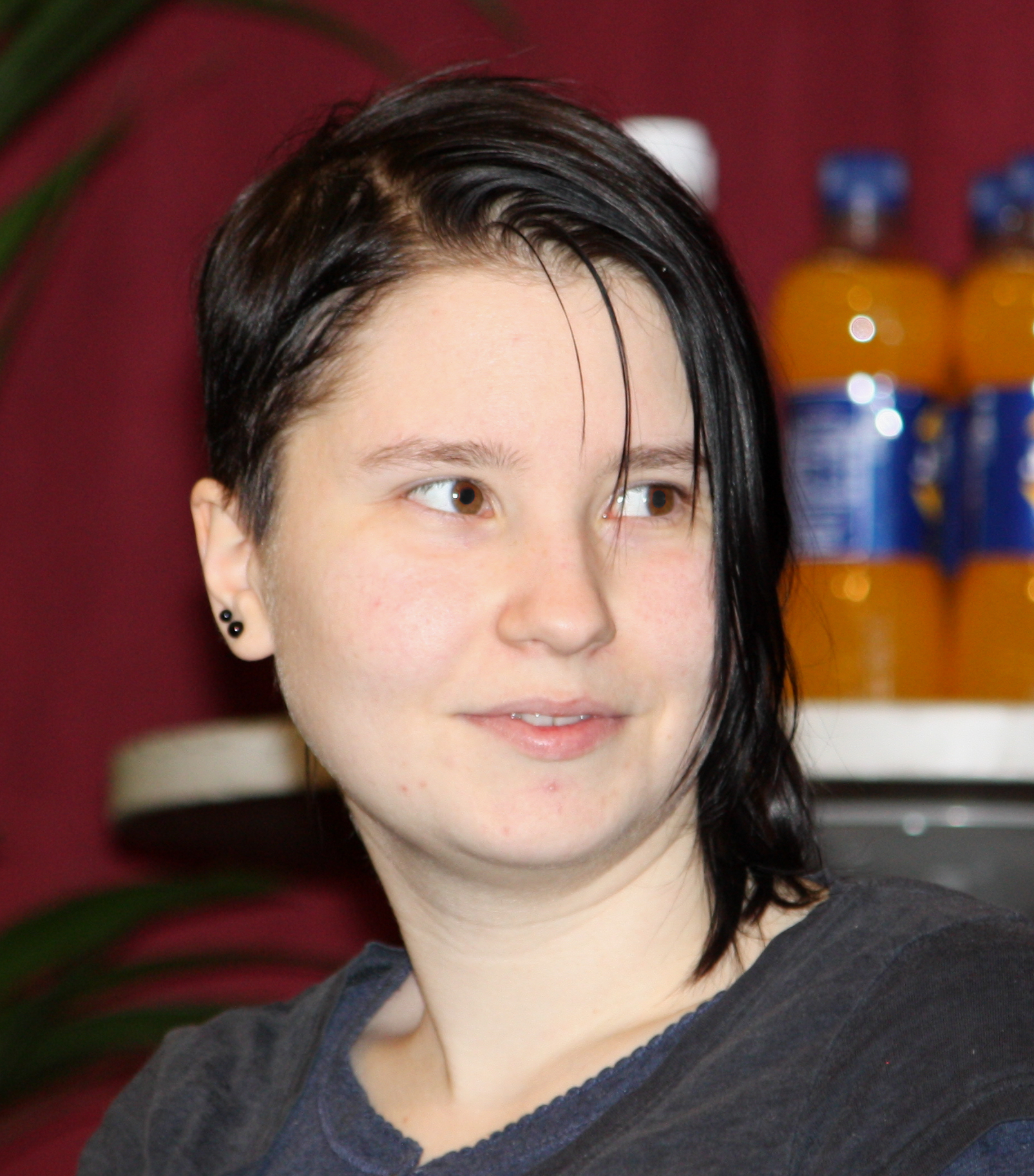
Tuuli Hypén at the Turku Book Fair, 2012

Tuuli Hypén (born 1983, Turku) is a Finnish comics artist known especially for her Nanna comics. Nanna cartoons have been published in several albums and in newspapers such as Turun Sanomat and Helsingin Sanomat, and was a candidate for the Sarjakuva-Finlandia prize in 2011. In addition to comics, Hypén has published two children's books, Veikan metsäretki (Arktinen Banaani, 2014) and Veikka ja talvi (Arktinen Banaani, 2016). Hypén also makes illustrations for games and teaches cartoon drawing, among other things.

Hypén graduated with a Master of Philosophy in Cultural History in 2012.

== Selected works ==
=== Comics albums ===
- Kas, kissa
- Kuoleman pidot
- Nanna
  - Nanna - Cityeläinkirja
  - Nanna 3
  - Nanna 2
  - Nanna - Eläimen pelikirja
  - Nanna - Ketun koko kuva

=== Books ===
- Veikan metsäretki (Arktinen banaani, 2014) ISBN 9789522701626
- Veikka ja talvi (Arktinen banaani, 2016) ISBN 9789522703002
- Karu kissakirja (poetry collection)

=== Board games ===
- Mule (M.U.L.E. The Board Game) (2015); Heikki Harju (designer); Ossi Hiekkala, Tuuli Hypén, Jere Kasanen (artists)
