= Elena Näsänen =

Finnish visual artist (born 1968)

- Born: 1968 (age 57–58)
- Website: www.elenanasanen.com

Elena Näsänen (born 1968) is a Finnish visual artist who works with film and video installations. She studied in the Department of Time and Space-based Art at the Academy of Fine Arts, Helsinki, receiving a master's degree in 1998. She has also studied at the Slade School of Fine Art in London and in the first edition of the Feature Expanded training programme.

In 2004–2007 she chaired the Artists' Association of Finland, being the first woman and the first video artist to hold that position. In 2000–2003 she chaired the interdisciplinary Artists’ Association MUU, founded in 1987 to represent new and experimental forms of art. In 2012–2016 she served as the film commissioner for media art at the Promotion Centre for Audiovisual Culture AVEK. Starting from 2018 she is working on a three-year grant from the Kone Foundation on a project to explore the effects of climate change using different formats of moving image. In 2021 Elena Näsänen was awarded a five-year Artist Professor grant for media art by the Arts Promotion Centre Finland.

Näsänen has participated in the work of international multidisciplinary artist groups in artists’ residencies. She is among the founders of the co-operative film and media art production house Kenno Filmi based in Helsinki, Finland.

Elana Näsänen lives and works in Helsinki, Finland and is married to the Finnish media artist Pekka Sassi.

== Art work ==
Elena Näsänen works with video installations and elements of narrative cinema. She works with familiar elements of narrative film, deconstructing and reconstructing scenes to tell a new kind of story where the action often takes place outside the space or time depicted and is left for the viewer to fill in.

Sound is always an essential component in her works. Works involving narrative storytelling typically feature female characters often at a crossroads, faced with the challenge to choose, or reaching for a goal that seems far away. For example, in "Before Rain" (1998) short sequences in ‘film noir’ style are used to create suspense that stays unresolved, in "Night" (2007) a female character follows an urge to leave the house at night to follow a path deep into a forest, and in "Wasteland" (2009) a group of women are on their way to an unknown task and destiny. In "Drive" (2003) action movie elements accompany a young woman speeding through a snowy landscape. "Drive" has been seen to highlight the surreal in the Finnish reality while depicting survival in a world constructed by men. Näsänen has characterized some of her works as ‘feminist road movies‘.

Time and nature are key elements in her works. Time is strictly connected with images and the works seem to have an autonomous time dimension. "The Spell" and "Round", premiered in the same exhibition in 2011, have been seen to reflect two different approaches to time. In "The Spell" a group of people have fallen asleep in the middle of a party while “time ticks by slowly but surely, like the timeline of modern western society”. The two-channel video installation "Round" shows the same series of events experienced in parallel by a female and a male actor. Time seems to stand still and the recurring sequence of events “corresponds to the cyclic concept of time of many early and eastern religions and cultures”. Despite the scant action there is ”strong cinematic tension” where “time becomes condensed”.

Nature has more than a secondary role in her works and sometimes seems to dominate the image and the characters. In non-narrative works nature has a central role or the focus is on the relationship between humans and the nature.

“Maybe Elena Näsänen here revives a contemporary view onto the sublime other: Nature as it has become the unfamiliar other for us city dwellers. Only virtually controlled by infrastructure as in "Drive" and exploited by tourism as in "The Mountain", or endangered by industrial exploitation ("Wasteland"), nature still holds a mystery. This mystery may be contained by the Australian outback, the Chinese yellow mountains, or the Finnish landscape.”

== Works in exhibitions, screenings and collections ==
Elena Näsänen's works have been widely shown in Finland and internationally, lately at film festivals in France (2017), Spain (2017), Germany (2017), Korea (2015) and Turkey (2014), in screenings of Finnish video art in Uruguay (2018), United Kingdom (2016), USA (2016), Norway (2013) and Brazil (2013), in a group exhibition in Korea (2014) and on a tour of five countries of the exhibition “Bodies, Borders, Crossings” (2011–2014). In Finland her videos have been shown for example in a selective retrospective of media art projects funded by the Promotion Centre for Audiovisual Culture Finland AVEK over 30 years (2017), in a premiere held in the gallery of the Alvar Alto Museum (2013) and in a joint exhibition of three Finnish video artists in Helsinki Kunstahalle (2007). Her videos have also been broadcast by The Finnish Public Service Media Company Yle, on ARTE as well as on TV channels in Sweden and Spain.

Works by Näsänen are held in the Finnish National Gallery: "Matka"/"Journey" (1996) in the Museum of Contemporary Art Kiasma and "Kantama"/"Range" (2007) in the Collection of the State Art Commission.
