= Hannu-Pekka Hänninen =

Finnish sports commentator (born 1952)

- Born: 27 July 1952; Helsinki, Finland
- Other names: Hoopi
- Occupation: Sports Broadcaster

Hannu-Pekka "Hoopi" Hänninen (born 27 July 1952) is a Finnish sports commentator who works for Finland's National Broadcasting Company, Yle. He serves both as the real-time play-by-play commentator and as a sports reader on Yle's sports news program, Urheiluruutu. His career as a sportscaster started in 1977. Before that, he had a short spell as entertainment staff on the radio. He was born in Helsinki, and trained as a telecommunications engineer.

Hänninen is a multi-skilled sportscaster who can comment on almost every sport. Nowadays he usually commentates only on football, ski jumping, and Nordic combined. In the 1990s, he frequently covered athletics, often alongside Kari Hiltunen. Among others, he commentated on Kimmo Kinnunen's World Championship-winning javelin throw in 1991 Tokyo, Sari Essayah's World Championship-winning 10 km walk in 1993 Stuttgart, and Aki Parviainen's World Championship-winning javelin throw in 1999 Sevilla. He has also commentated on every Olympic Games on television since 1984 in Los Angeles. One of his main moments in the Olympic games is the commentation of Matti Nykänen's gold-winning jump in the 1988 Winter Olympics in Calgary. He has also been the main commentator of swimming in Yle for a long time.

"Hoopi" has also been one of the main commentators in the Football World Cup and European Championships since 1986 Mexico, but had his first football World Cup commentation almost ten years earlier in Argentina 1978, when he commentated a couple of the first-round matches from the studio in Pasila, Helsinki, because the main commentators Anssi Kukkonen and Pentti Salmi were unable to do so because of the number of games and traveling. The greatest moments of his football commentating career among others are the Euro 92 final in Sweden and the 2002 FIFA World Cup final. He is the main football commentator in YLE together with Tapio Suominen.
