= Johanna Rytkölä =

Finnish sculptor (born 1956)

- Born: 1956 (age 68–69)

Johanna Rytkölä (née Johanna Näsänen; born 1956) is a Finnish sculptor who works in stoneware ceramics. She studied at the University of Art and Design (now part of Aalto University) in Helsinki, Finland, receiving a Master of Arts degree in the Department of Art Education in 1982, and in 1986, a Master of Arts degree in the Department of Ceramics and Glass Design. She received the state artist grant for a five-year period in 2008 and for one year in 2015. In 2023 she was granted the national artist pension. She lives and works in Vantaa, Finland, in her studio house renovated from a former grocery store building.

Johanna Rytkölä had her first solo exhibitions in 1988 in Galleria Bronda in Helsinki, Finland, and in the gallery Blås & Knåda in Stockholm, Sweden. She has since held numerous solo exhibitions and presented her works in joint and group exhibitions in Finland and abroad, for example in Austria, Romania, Ireland, Germany, USA and India.

Johanna Rytkölä’s so far largest solo exhibition, comprising ceramic sculptures from 2013-2023, was hosted by Kymenlaakso Museum in Kotka, Finland.

== Works ==
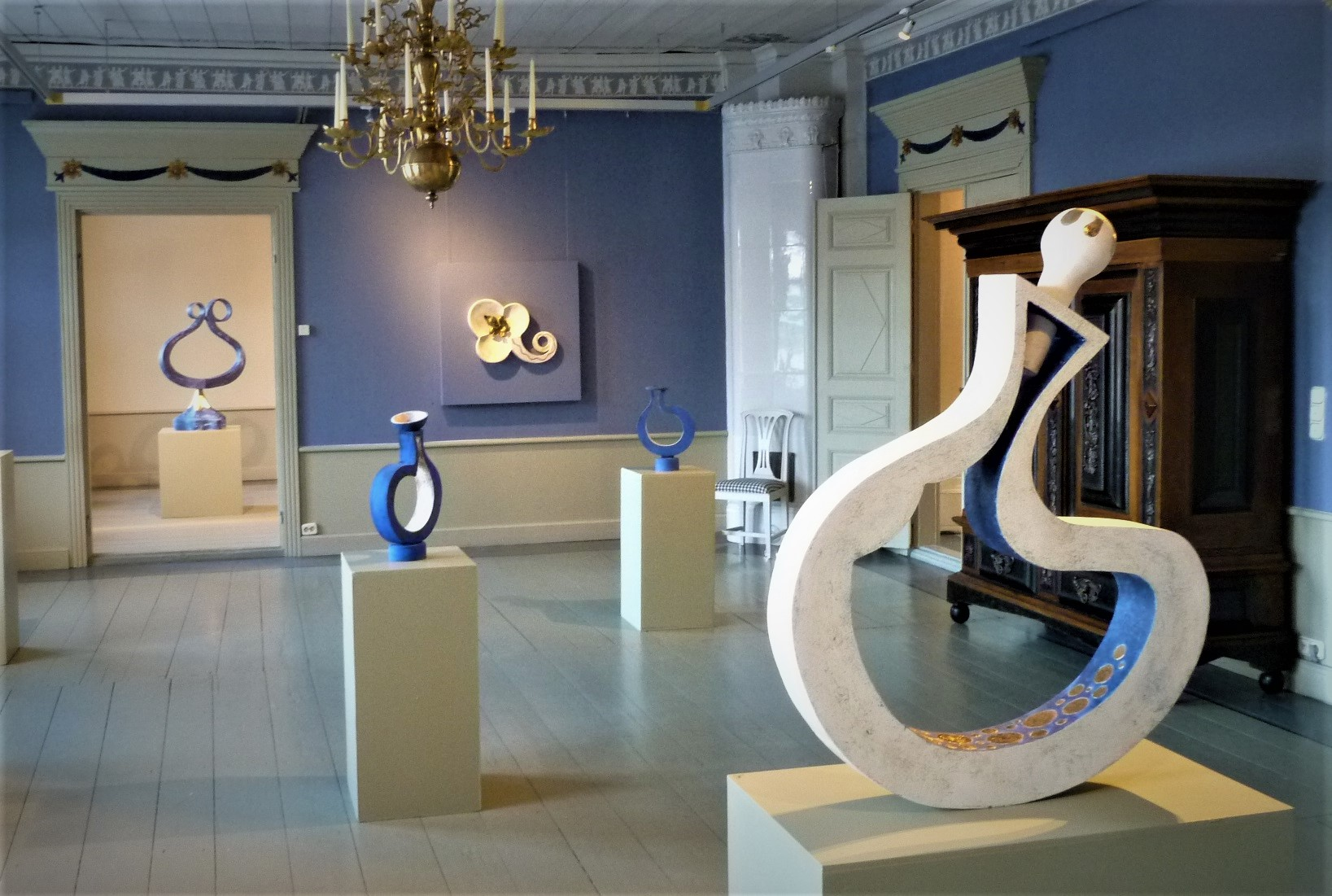
Johanna Rytkölä, solo exhibition 2016, Heinola Art Museum, Finland.

Johanna Rytkölä combines sculpture and ceramic art to create unique artworks. She is primarily a sculptor, having never worked in functional ceramics. Her sculptures are made of stoneware ceramics, with clear forms, bright colors and an interplay of matt and shiny surfaces as characteristic features. According to Jennifer Hawkins Opie, Rytkölä has ”an especially acute sense of color and an ability to create and control colors in her work.”

While the works tend to be impressive in size, curving forms often evoke an impression of movement, suggestive of dance, music, or streaming water. The curved shapes of her works have been described, on the one hand, geometric or architectural or, on the other, organic or biomoprhic. Nevertheless, her works have also been considered “surreal” and not constricted by form.

Åsa Hellman writes in the book Taidekeramiikka Suomessa [Ceramic art in Finland]:

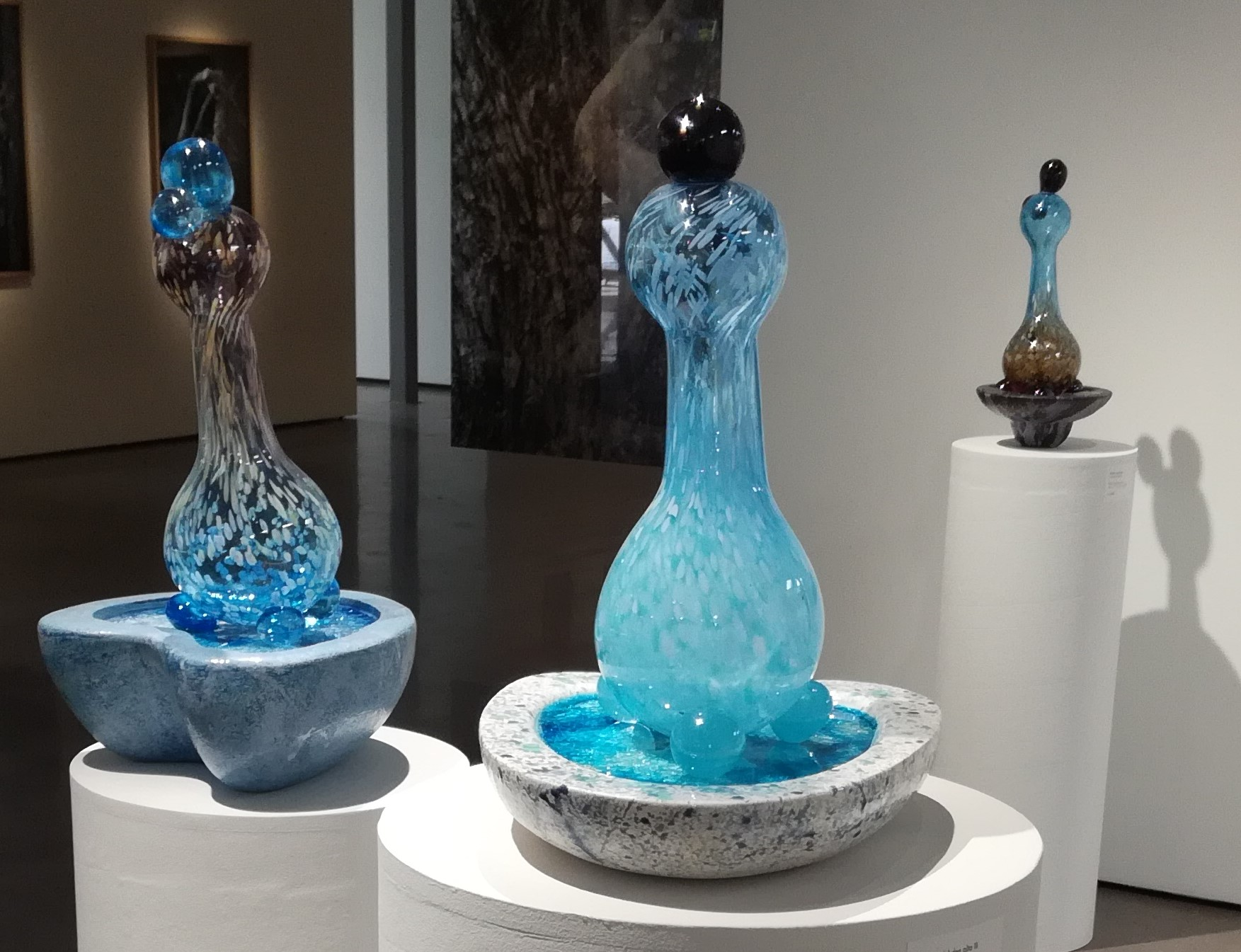
Johanna Rytkölä 2024, exhibition in Gumbostrand Konst & Form, Finland.

"Johanna Rytkölä's works immediately drew attention when she started to participate in exhibitions in the 1980s. The public was used to associating sculpture with stone, bronze, plaster or wood. While clay sculptures had for long been made by Finnish ceramicists they had often had a more industrial design and decorative flavor. Johanna Rytkölä presented completely abstract artworks, closer to traditional sculpture in form and expression but still based on mastery of ceramic techniques."

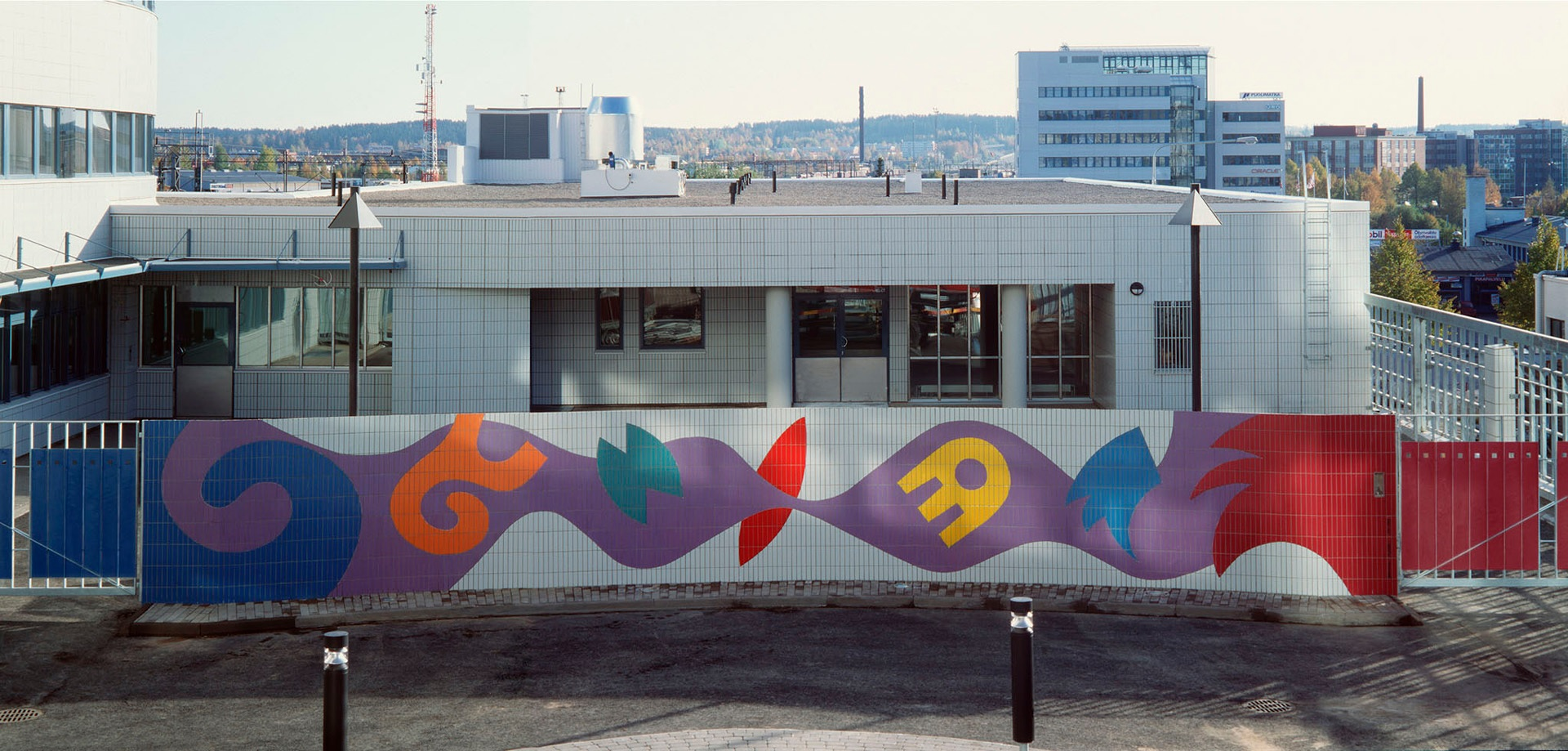
Johanna Rytkölä, Wall of Joy 1993, Tampere, Finland.

With her mastery of the techniques, Rytkölä has been seen to continue the tradition of Finnish ceramic art but also to stand out due to her stance associated with sculpture. She has been considered an innovator both as a sculptor and as a ceramic artist.

For a new housing area under construction in the city of Vantaa she has designed public artworks in which sculptures made of Finnish granite have inlaid details made of ceramics. Sculptures combining granite with ceramics, made in cooperation with a natural stone refinement company, were first presented in her solo exhibition in 2022. Elise Simonsson writes in the booklet accompanying the exhibition:

“At Rytkölä’s exhibition, you're stunned by the stone sculptures in which you find round pink glazed ceramic pieces. The stone surfaces have been polished. As though they had been recently moistened with water.--- A glazed ceramic colour patch changes the colouration of the entire work.”

In 2024 she exhibited sculptures that combine ceramics with blown glass, made in cooperation with two glassblowers.

== Works in collections and in the urban landscape ==
The Finnish National Gallery has a number of works by Johanna Rytkölä, for example, the massive Walking Snail (1987). A number of public and private art collections in Finland have acquired her ceramic sculptures, as well as art and design museums and collections of ceramic art in other countries, for example, Röhsska Museum in Göteborg, Sweden.

The 14 meter long "Wall of Joy" was designed by Johanna Rytkölä for the square of the police headquarters in the city of Tampere in 1993. The colorful ceramic mural is composed of factory made clinker tiles.

In 2005, a 12 meter long wall-like ceramic sculpture was created jointly by three Finnish artists: Päivi Kiuru, Maarit Mäkelä and Johanna Rytkölä. The work is built along a walkway in the residential area Arabianranta in Helsinki. The building blocks of the ceramic wall carry serigraph printed pictures of the Arabia porcelain factory formerly located in the area.

In 2018, Johanna Rytkölä created a series of large relief sculptures for Katriina hospital in Vantaa, Finland. The ceramic reliefs are composed of a number of fragments, with recycled glass details. The artworks were commissioned by Vantaa Art Museum.

== International awards and honours ==
In 1995, Johanna Rytkölä's ceramic sculpture ”On the way to paradise II” received the silver medal of the Presidency of the Republic in the 49th international ceramics competition “Premio Faenza” in Italy.

In 1997, Rytkölä's design for a plate received an Award of Merit in the Kutani International Decorative Ceramics Competition in Komatsu, Japan.

== Memberships ==
Johanna Rytkölä joined the Association of Finnish Sculptors in 1991 and the Finnish Association of Designers Ornamo in 1987. She has frequently served in an expert role, for example on the Finnish State Art Commission in 1996–1998 and in the steering group for the exhibition of contemporary Finnish ceramic art, “Ceramics & Space” in Helsinki in 2014.

Johanna Rytkölä has been a member of the International Academy of Ceramics (IAC-AIC) since 2007. In 2021 she was on the organising committee for the IAC Congress held in Finland together with the Arctic Ceramic Center.

Johanna Rytkölä is founding member in several artists´ groups formed to promote ceramics as art. The group Helsinki Fat Clay was established in 2008 to promote Finnish ceramic art internationally. In 2012 the group was invited to present their works in the International Museum of Ceramics in Faenza, Italy. In 2019 Helsinki Fat Clay had an exhibition in Stockholm, Sweden.
