= Ritva Puotila =

Finnish textile designer

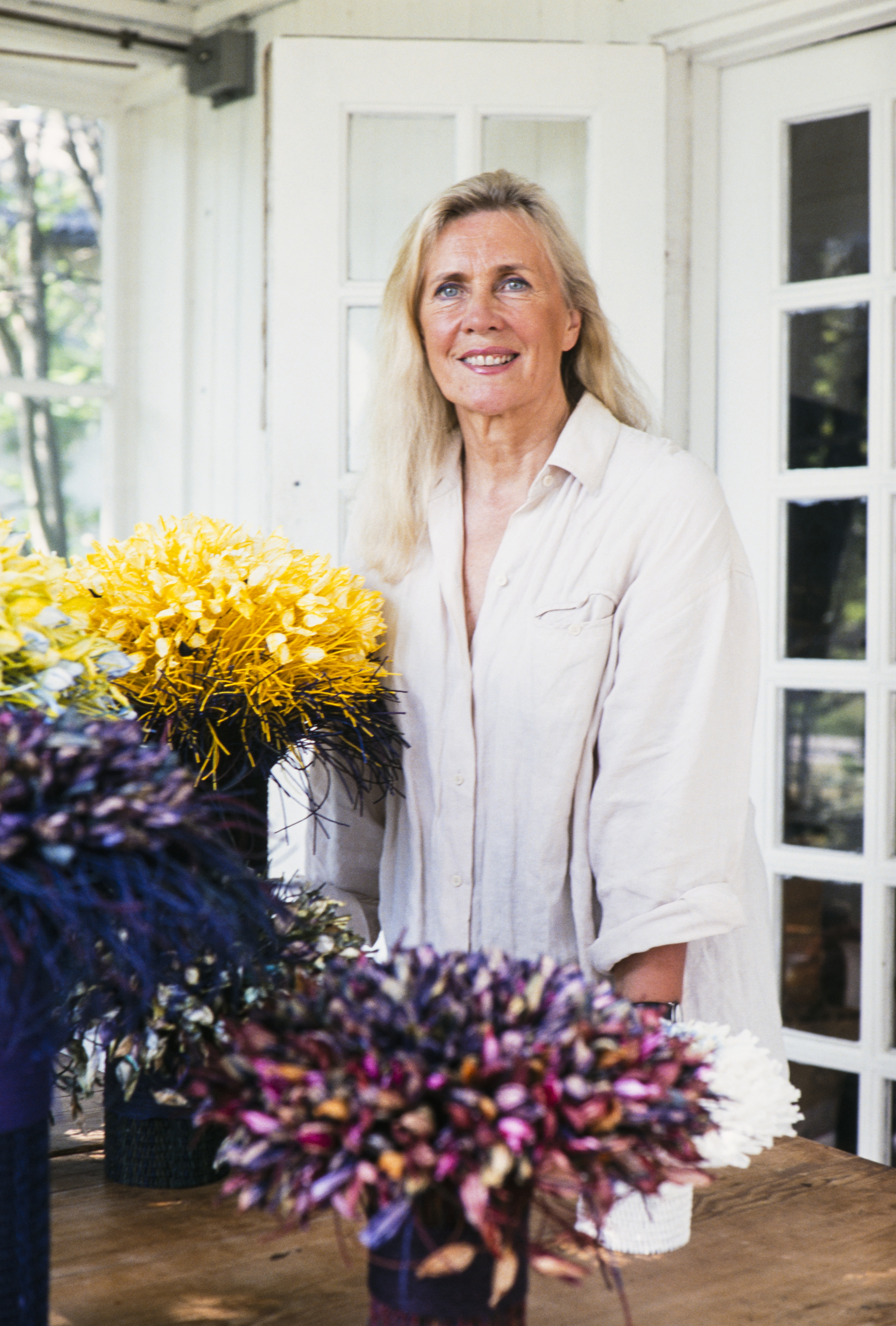
- Ritva Puotila in 1993
- Born: June 7, 1935 (age 90); Vyborg, Finnish Karelia (now Russia)
- Occupations: Textile designer, visual artist
- Children: 3, including Jukka Puotila

Ritva Soilikki Puotila (born 7 June 1935) is a Finnish textile designer and artist. She is the artistic director of the Finnish design company Woodnotes, which she founded in 1987 alongside her son Mikko Puotila. She is known for rugs and carpets, which she typically makes from paper string and linen. The rugs have a clear graphic pattern, and influences from both Japanese and traditional Finnish crafts. She had three sons, including actor Jukka Puotila.

She has received the Suomi Award in 1996, the Kaj Franck Design Award in 2000, the Pro Finlandia Medal in 2003, and the Ornamo award in 2011. Her artwork can be found in the museum collections at the Museum of Modern Art in New York City, the Art Gallery of Western Australia in Perth, National Museum of Art, Architecture and Design in Oslo, and the Baltimore Museum of Art.

== See also ==
- List of Finnish women artists
