= Lennart Segerstråle =

Finnish painter and graphic artist (1892–1975)

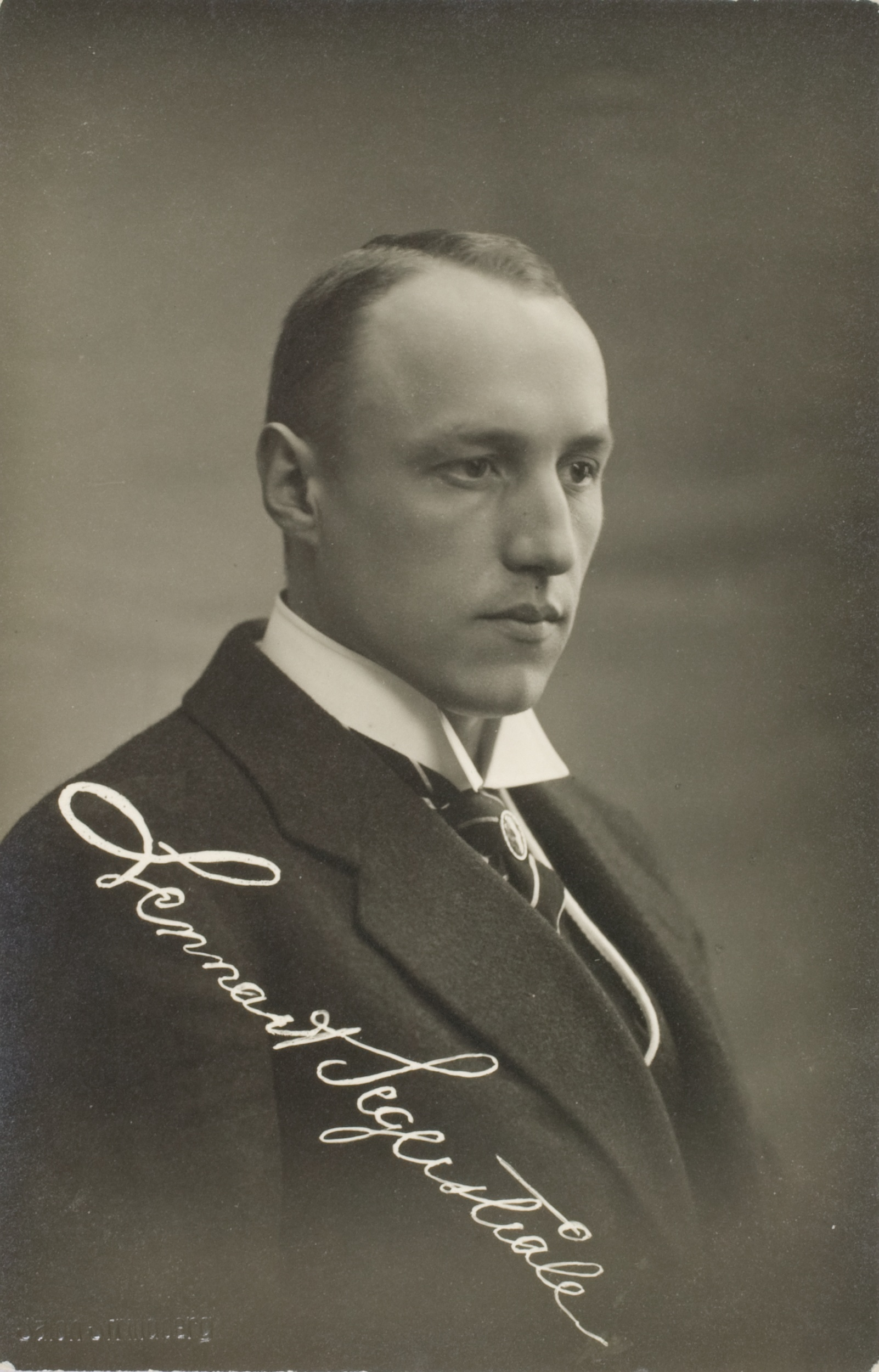
Lennart Rafael Segerstråle (1910)

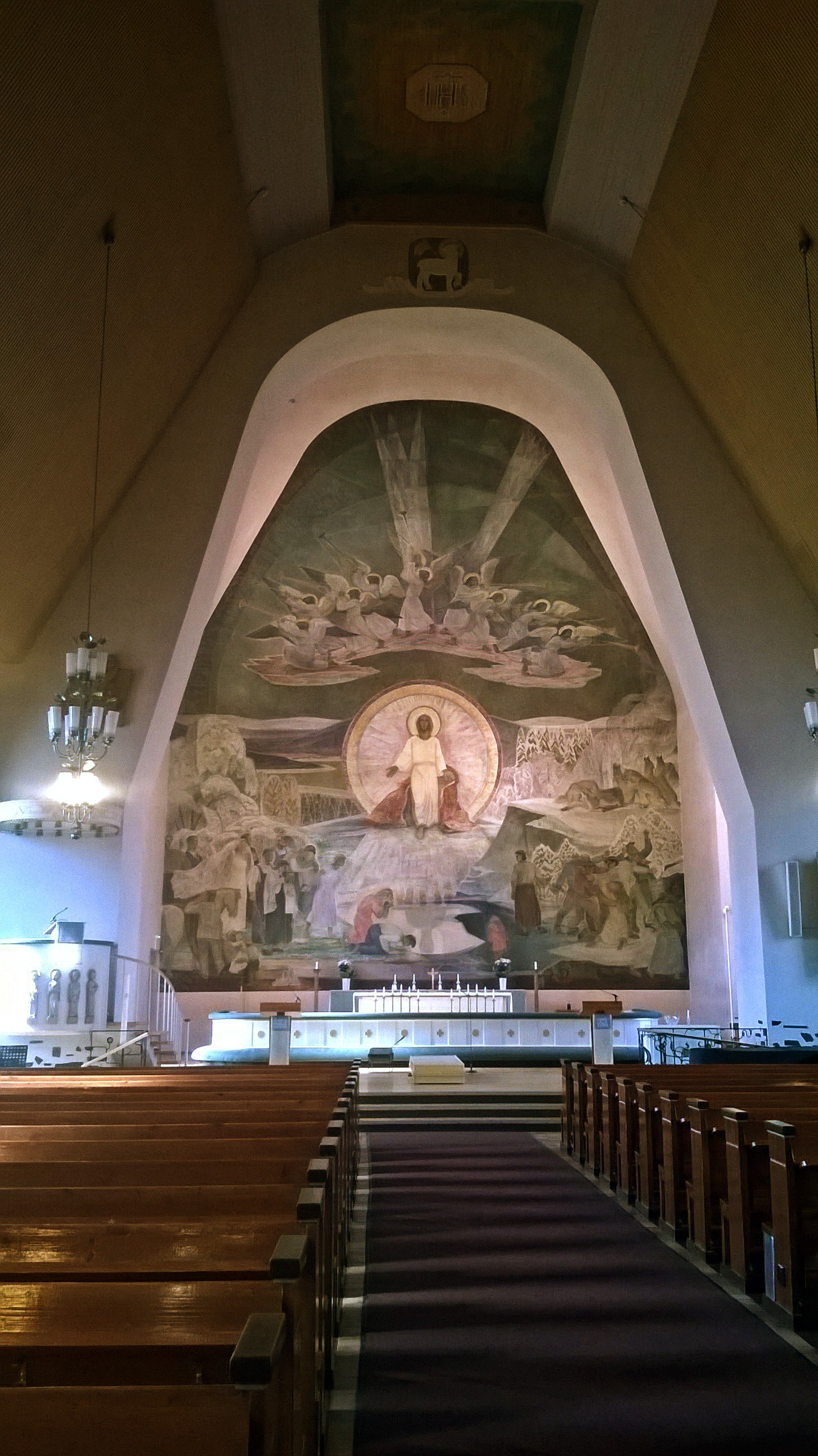
"Livets källa" altar mural by Lennart Segerstråle at Rovaniemi Church

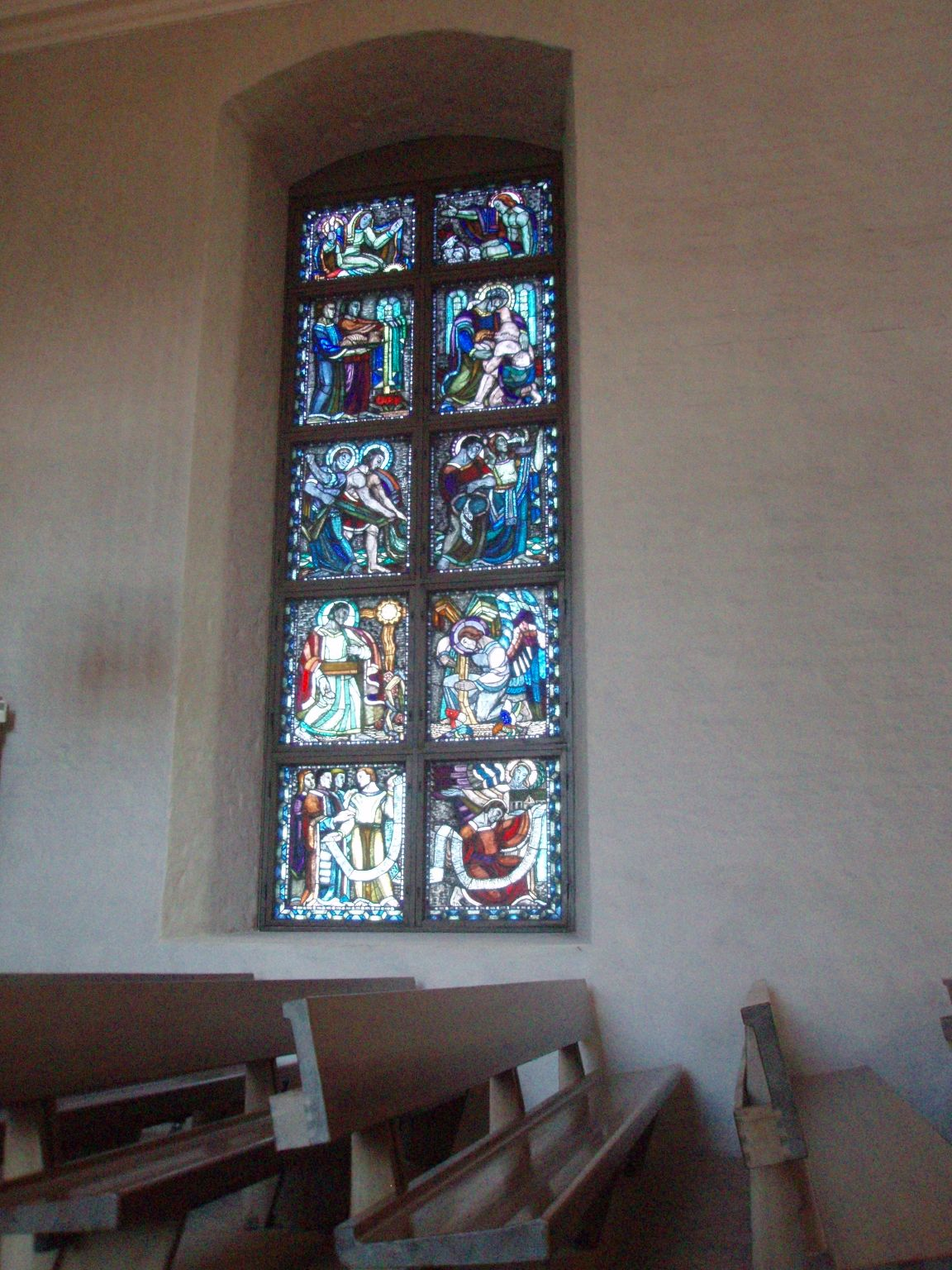
Stained glass window by Lennart Segerstråle at Kirkkonummi Church

Lennart Rafael Segerstråle (17 June 1892 – 11 April 1975) was a Finnish painter and graphic artist. He was best known for his murals and frescoes. Alongside his major works, Segerstråle made woodcuts, etchings, drypoint works, and lithographs.

== Biography ==
Lennart Rafael Segerstråle was born in Helsinki Rural Municipality, now Vantaa, on the outskirts of Helsinki. He was a Swedish-speaking Finn. He is the second child of Knut Albert Segerstråle, a theologian and teacher at the Borgå High School in Porvoo and Hanna Frosterus-Segerstråle, painter. His younger sister, Solveig von Schoultz (1907–1996) became known as a poet and author of news and children's books.

Lennart Segerstråle first attended the Fine Arts at the University of Helsinki, where he studied under the direction of painter and art professor Eero Järnefelt (1863–1937).

From 1919 he devoted himself exclusively to art, especially painting. He began to make himself known by the quality of his images and animal motifs. In the 1920s and 1930s he became the most famous animal painter in Finland. Its aim is to represent a harmonious combination of animals, birds and landscapes.

Proceeding in his artistic career Segerstråle developed an increased interests in monumental art, he also produced several stained-glass windows for churches both in Finland and Sweden. In 1929 he perfected his studies in frescoes and mosaic art at the Royal Academy of Fine Arts in Copenhagen, under the direction of Joakim Skovgaard (1856–1933) one of the most influential Danish artist of his times. Segerstråle worked also with Skovgaard as his assistant in 1927 for the creation of the mosaic in the apse of the Cathedral of Lund.

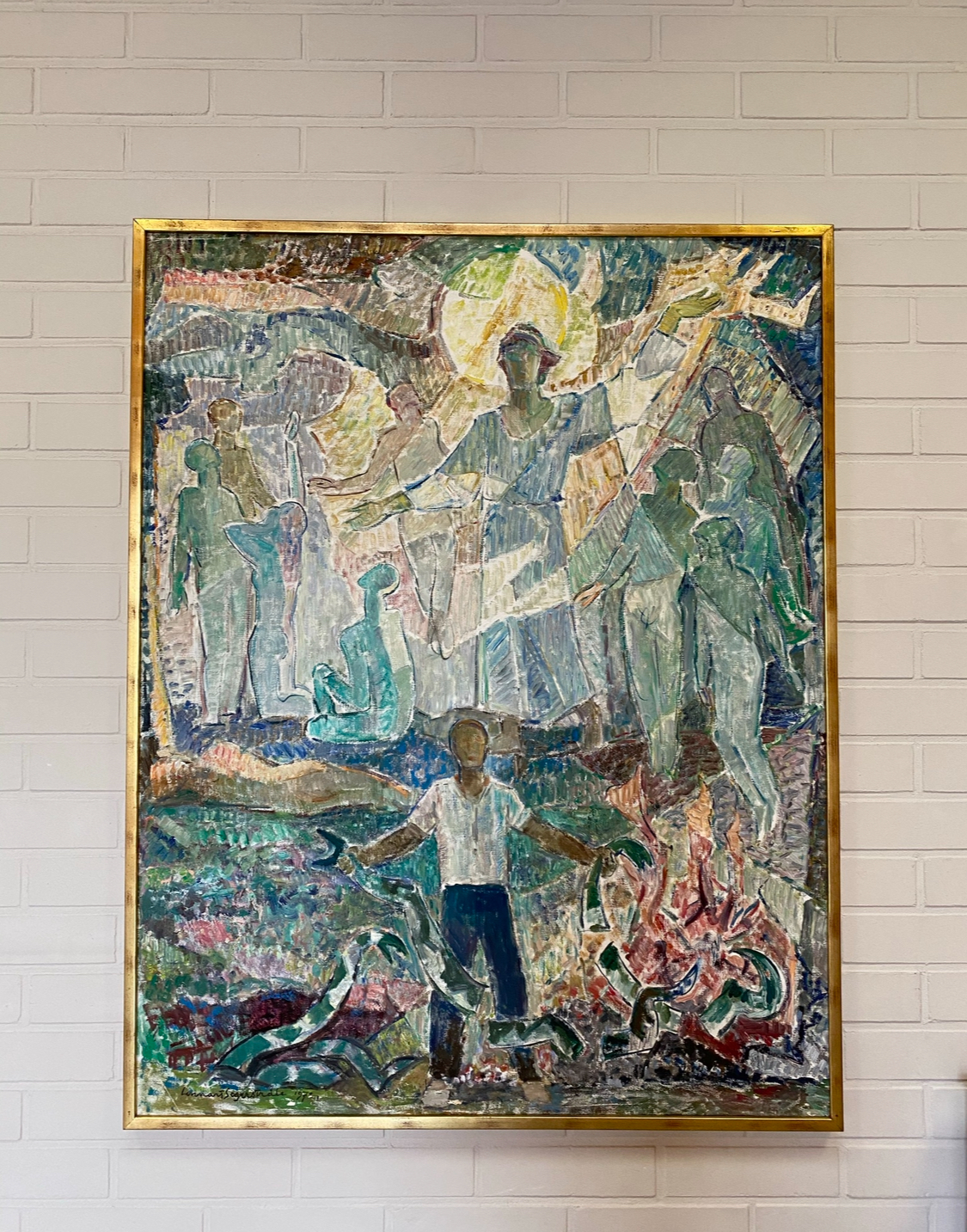
Segerstråle's painting in Siuntio Parish Hall.

This new orientation of his artistic life is strongly underpinned by his Christian and humanist convictions, which lead him later to concentrate on monumental art and religious themes. Segerstråle painted several altarpieces and realized stained glass windows in the churches of Finland and Sweden.

Among his most notable "secular" works it is worth to remember Finlandiafreskerna, the frescoes of the headquarters of the Bank of Finland in Helsinki, which he realized in 1943 and is considered his main masterpiece. In 1959, he created Vid livets källa (1959), a fresco in the dining room of the Caux Palace Hotel in Montreux, Switzerland, as part of his engagement with the international humanist movement Moral Re-Armament (now known as Initiatives of Change), a commitment to which the artist explained in a text published in 1967 ("Why Moral Re-Armament").

Segerstråle exhibited regularly in Helsinki from 1913 to 1967, as well as abroad. He was a member of the Honorary Committee of the International Cultural Center of Royaumont, in Val-d'Oise, France. He died at Kauniainen in suburban Helsinki, Finland.

== Selected works ==
- Kristuskyrkan (Christ Church), Helsinki. "Skapelsens lovsång" ("Praise to Creation"), stained glass window on the tower bell, 1928.
- Reposaari Church, fresco on the arch vault.
- Art Museum Serlachius Gustaf and Gösta (Manor of Joenniemi), plafond of the library, Mänttä-Vilppula, 1935
- Finlandia, frescoes, Bank of Finland, Helsinki. 1943–1944
- Rovaniemi Church, "Livets källa" altar mural, 1951
- Varkaus Church, Apse fresco, 1952–1953
- Uppståndelse (Ascension), Chapel painting, 1954, in Själevad, Sweden
- Paradisfåglarna (Paradise Birds), painting, 1967, Town Hall Wedding Room, Lund, Sweden
- Det nya världshjärtat 'The New World Heart', 1973, painting in a Dunchurch school in Warwickshire, UK
- Taggtråd eller försoning (Reconciliation), painting, 1973 at Westminster Theatre in London, UK

== Bibliography ==
- Tusch: Djurbilder med text af Lennart Segerstråle, Holger Schildts förlag, Borg, (1916)
- Vildmarkssyner, H.Schildt, Helsinki, (1924)
- Kultur och kristendom (Culture and Christianity), Wahlström & Widstrand, (1943)
- Finlandiafreskernas år: Bilder av ett folk i kamp (Finnish Frescoes), Lindfors, Stockholm (1944)
