= Sophie Taxell =

Finnish painter (1911–1996)

- Born: June 20, 1911; Leppävirta
- Died: September 14, 1996 (aged 85)

Sophie Taxell (June 20, 1911 Leppävirta – 14 September 1996) was a Finnish painter. She also lived in Port Charlotte, Florida. Taxell was a member of Group X/10, Ryhmä X/10.

Taxell studied at Vapaa taidekoulu from 1944 to 1948. Her first public showing came in 1950 in Helsinki. Taxell had several exhibitions in Finland, Washington D.C., Annapolis Virginia, Maryland, Bethesda, Chanel in Florida, Punta Gorda and in Venice in Italy. Her works are for instance in Ateneum art museum in Helsinki and in Washington D.C. Public Library. Taxell was a member of Suomen Kuvataiteilijaseniorit and Charlotte County Art Guild (USA). Her parents were Pekka Mykrä and Lyydia Mykrä (Kauhanen). Sophie Taxell was married with typographer Christian Taxell.
