= Solveig von Schoultz =

Swedish-speaking Finnish writer and teacher (1907–1996)

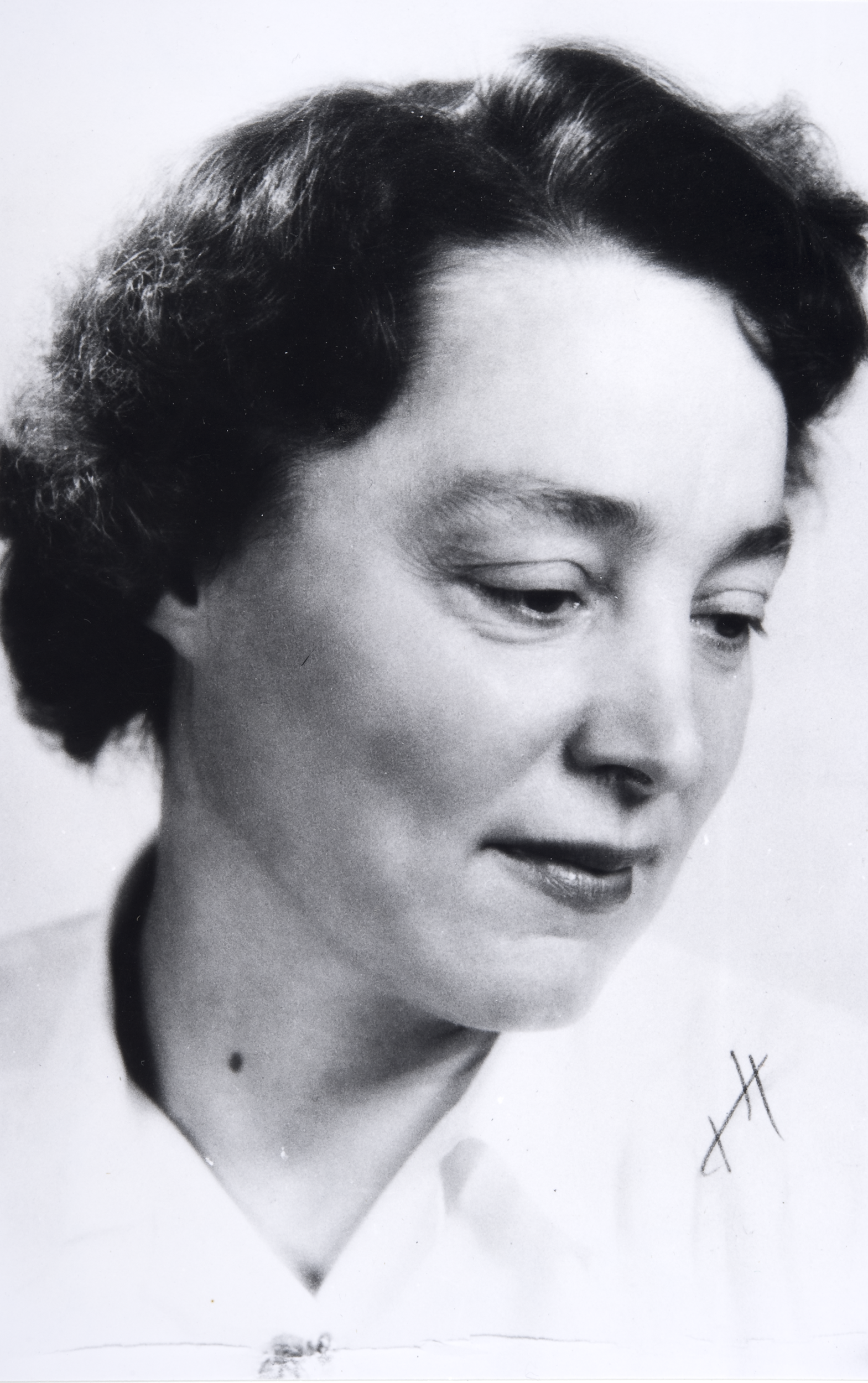
Solveig von Schoultz

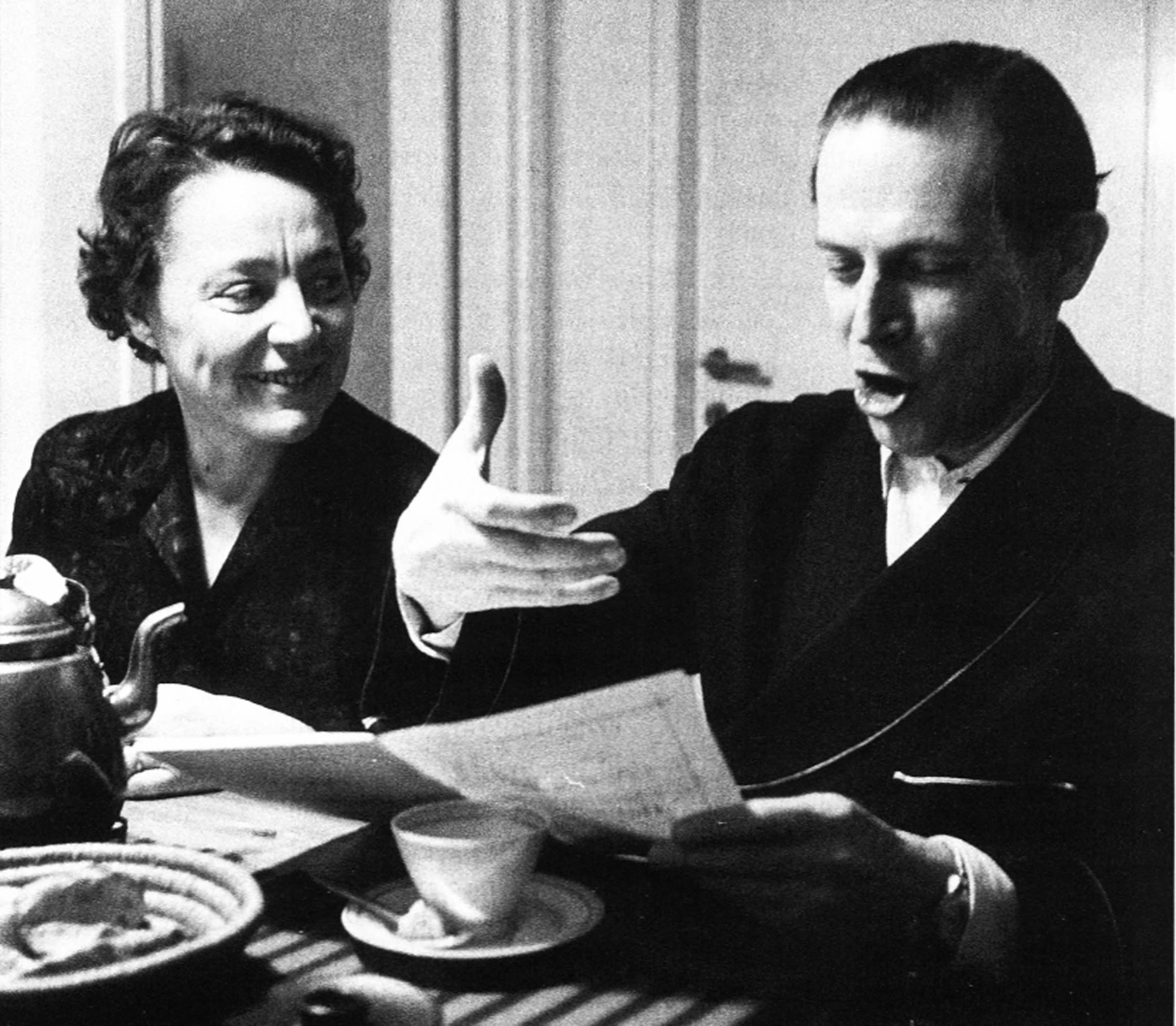
Solveig von Schoultz and her husband Erik Bergman in 1962

Solveig Margareta von Schoultz (5 August 1907 – 3 December 1996) was a Swedish-speaking Finnish writer and teacher. She wrote poetry, children's novels, short stories, plays, and television and radio dramas.

== Biography ==
Solveig von Schoultz was born in Porvoo in 1907 to Albert Segerstråle, a reverend, and Hanna Frosterus-Segerstråle, a painter. She was the youngest of eight children. Her brother was the painter Lennart Segerstråle. She studied at the Nykarleby Seminarium during 1925–26, where she qualified as a primary school teacher. She worked as a freelance journalist for the Swedish-language newspaper Borgåbladet. In 1931, she married Sven von Schoultz, a lawyer, and took his surname under which she would publish for the rest of her career. She worked as a schoolteacher at Laguska Skolan, a private girls' school in Helsinki, from 1937 until 1972. In 1961, she divorced Sven von Schoultz and later married the Finnish composer Erik Bergman. She had two daughters, Ursula and Barbara.

von Schoultz made her writing debut in 1932 with the children's book Petra och silverapan. She was best known, however, for her poetry; she published 15 collections of poems between 1940 and 1996. Her first collection of poems, published in 1940, was titled Min timme, and her final collection, published in 1996, was titled Molnskuggan. The themes addressed in her poetry include existential issues, womanhood and motherhood. She also wrote numerous short stories, dealing mainly with love and relationships, which were published in anthologies including Ingenting ovanligt (1947), Den blomstertid (1958) and Kolteckning ofullbordad (1983). She also wrote fifteen radio plays, four television dramas, three theatrical plays and one novel.

von Schoultz won numerous awards for her writing: the Svenska Dagbladet Literature Prize in 1947, the Swedish Academy of Finland Award in 1970, the Edith Södergran Prize in 1984, the Bellman Prize in 1986, the Nils Ferlin Prize in 1988, the Längmanska Prize in 1993, and the Samfundet De Nio Special Prize in 1996. Additionally, she won the Kirjallisuuden valtionpalkinto (State Literary Award) five times, and was awarded an honorary PhD degree by the University of Helsinki in 1986. She published her memoirs, titled Längs vattenbrynet, in 1996, the same year that she died.

The Solveig von Schoultz competition (Solveig von Schoultz-tävlingen) is organized annually by Svenska Folkskolans Vänner. Short stories are submitted as competition entries every other year, and poems every other year.

== Bibliography ==
=== Children's literature ===
- Petra och silverapan, Helsinki, Schildts, 1932
- Nalleresan (illustrated by Tove Jansson), Stockholm, Wahlström & Widstrand, 1944
- Millaskolan (with photos by Gunilla Falck), Helsinki, Schildt, 1961
  - Milla-tädin koulu (translated by Vappu Vainio and with poems translated by Aale Tynni), Porvoo, W. Söderström, 1961 (Finnish)
  - Tante Millas Waldschule (translation by Sybille Didon), Balve i Westf., Engelbert-Verl., 1963 (German)

==== Teaching material ====
- Vi på Solgård : läsebok för första skolåret (with Margit Cavonius), Helsinki, Söderström, 1949
- Mera om Solgård : läsebok för andra skolåret (with Margit Cavonius), Helsinki, Söderström, 1952
- Vår rättskrivningsbok (with Gunnel Lilius), Helsinki, Söderström, 1956–1957
- Dikturval. 1 (with Magnus Hagelstam and Ragnar Holmerus), Helsinki, Söderström, 1958 (tenth edition revised by Solveig von Schoultz)
- Hos Lisa och Lasse (several books, along with Margit Cavonius), Helsinki, Söderström, 1962–

=== Lyrik ===
- Min timme, Helsinki, Schildt, 1940
- Den bortvända glädjen, Stockholm, Wahlström & Widstrand, 1944
- Eko av ett rop, Stockholm, Wahlström & Widstrand, 1945
- Nattlig äng, Stockholm, Wahlström & Widstrand, 1949
- Allt sker nu, Stockholm, Wahlström & Widstrand, 1952
  - Alles geschieht jetzt : eine dramatische Collage (translated by Gisbert Jänicke and with dramaturgy and direction by Anneli Mäkelä), Teatteri Avoimet ovet, 1997 (German)
- Nätet, Helsinki, Schildt, 1956
- Terrassen : tanka-svit (with drawings by Aina Enckell), Helsinki, Schildt, 1959
- Sänk ditt ljus, Helsinki, Schildt, 1963
- Klippbok : äldre och nya dikter, Helsinki, Schildt, 1968
- De fyra flöjtspelarna, Schildt, 1975, ISBN 951-50-0094-7
- Bortom träden hörs havet, Schildt, 1980, ISBN 951-50-0233-8
  - Puitten takaa kuulee meren : valitut runot 1940–1989 (translated by Helena Anhava), WSOY, 1991, ISBN 951-0-17419-X (Finnish)
- En enda minut : dikter 1940–1980, Schildt, 1981, ISBN 9515002419
- Vattenhjulet, Schildt, 1986, ISBN 951-50-0342-3
- Alla träd väntar fåglar : dikter 1940–1986, Schildt, 1988, ISBN 951-50-0439-X
- Ett sätt att räkna tiden, Schildt, 1988, ISBN 951-50-0449-7
- Snow and summers : (poems 1940–1989) (translated by Anne Born), Forest Books, 1989, ISBN 0-948259-52-3 (English)
- Samtal med en fjäril, Schildt, 1994 ISBN 951500649X
- Molnskuggan, Schildt, 1996, ISBN 951-50-0807-7
  - Pilvenvarjo (translated by Helena Anhava), WSOY, 1997, ISBN 951-0-22220-8
- Den heliga oron, Schildt, 1997, ISBN 951-50-0859-X
  - Den heliga oron : dikter i urval 1940–1996 (with previously unpublished poems from the 1960s), Schildt, 2007, ISBN 978-951-50-1715-4
- Den finlandssvenska dikten (part 9, in selection of Bo Carpelan), Bonnier, 2001, ISBN 9100577324

==== Music printing ====
- Adjö for soprano, flute and guitar (by Kaija Saariaho with text by Solveig von Schoultz), Finnish music information center, 1985
- Den heliga oron (by Erik Bergman, suite for mezzo-soprano and string quartet to texts by Solveig von Schoultz), Fazer, cop. 1996
- Ögonblicket : Op. 128 ; sång och piano (by Erik Bergman,5 songs to lyrics by Solveig von Schoultz), Fazer, 1997, cop. 1996

=== Fictional prose ===
- December (novel), Helsinki, Schildt, 1937
- De sju dagarna : Två barn skapar sin värld (childhood portrayal), Stockholm, Wahlström & Widstrand, 1942
- Ingenting ovanligt : noveller, Stockholm, Wahlström & Widstrand, 1947
  - Heijastus ikkunassa (thirteen short stories in translation by Kyllikki Härkäpää and Kristiina Kivivuori), WSOY, 1987, ISBN 951-0-14277-8 (Finnish)
- Närmare någon : noveller, Helsinki, Schildt, 1951
- Ansa och samvetet (autobiographical childhood stories), Helsinki, Schildt, 1954
- Den blomstertid (short story collection), Helsinki, Schildt, 1958
- Även dina kameler (short story collection), Helsinki, Schildt, 1965
  - Ja juotan kamelisikin (eight short stories, translated by Toini Havu), Porvoo, W. Söderström, 1967 (Finnish)
- Rymdbruden : noveller, Helsinki, Schildt, 1970
- Där står du, Schildt, 1973, ISBN 9515000386
- Somliga mornar : noveller, Schildt, 1976, ISBN 951-50-0123-4
- Porträtt av Hanna (about the author's mother, Hanna Frosterus-Segerstråle), Schildt, 1978, ISBN 9515001773
  - Hanna : äidin muotokuva (translated by Kyllikki Villa), WSOY, 1980, ISBN 951-0-09348-3 (Finnish)
- Kolteckning, ofullbordad, Schildt, 1983, ISBN 9515002818
- Ingen dag förgäves : noveller 1947–1983, Schildt, 1984, ISBN 9515003075
- Nästa dag : noveller i urval, Schildt, 1991, ISBN 951-50-0518-3
- Längs vattenbrynet, Schildt, 1992, ISBN 951-50-0518-3
  - Pitkin vedenviiva (translated by Jaana Koistinen), Söderström, 1993, ISBN 951-0-19016-0 (Finnish)
- Påskebrev og andre finlandssvenske noveller (translated by Bent Søndergaard), Museum Tusculanum, 1997, ISBN 87-7289-410-5
- Det som har varit, det som är : en brevbiografi (selection and commentaries by Inga-Britt Wik), Schildt, 1999, ISBN 9515010225

=== Radio ===
- Systrar (radio play), Yleisradio, 1988

=== Contributions to anthologies and magazines ===
- Barndomshemmet i våra minnen : nitton finlandssvenskar berättar om sin barndom (edited by Gunnar Mårtenson), Helsinki, Schildt, 1948
- Författarna berättar (compiled by Kurt Lobbas and Solveig von Schoultz), Helsinki, Söderström, 1960
- Barn i böcker (teaching materials, selected by Harriet Alfons and Qui Nyström, pedagogical design by Susanna Ekström), Natur och kultur, 1977, ISBN 9127249778
- "Främlingen" i Noveller nu : en svensk antologi från 50-tal till 70-tal (compiled by Vivi Edström and Per-Arne Henricson), Prisma, 1978 ISBN 9151811324
- "Den hösten", sidorna 105–107 i Porträtt av Vilhelm Moberg (editor: Gunnar Eidevall), Carlsson, 1993, ISBN 91-7798-708-X
- "Träsket : en novell" pages 36–40, and "[Självbiografiska anteckningar]" pages 30–31, and the poem "Gäddan" page 21, i Om : Ordfront magasin, Ordfront, ISSN 0284-981X, 1995 (21:4)
- "Det dubbla ljuset" (about Erik Bergmans opera Det sjungande trädet), pages 52–55 i Musik (Stockholm), Svenska rikskonserter, 1994-1998, ISSN 1104-957X, 1995:7
- Kvinnor runt Östersjön (compiled by Meta Ottosson), En bok för alla, 1996, ISBN 9174488953
- "Flyktingtåg", page153–154 i Flykten valde oss : dikter om att fly från sitt land : en antologi (editors: Siv Widerberg and Viveka Heyman), En bok för alla, 1999, ISBN 9172210788

=== Translations by von Schoultz ===
- Yrjö Kokko, Jorden och vingarna (Pessi ja Illuusia satu) (translated with Sven von Schoultz), Schildt, 1945
