= Nanna Hänninen =

- Born: 1973 (age 52–53); Rovaniemi, Finland
- Known for: Photographic art
- Style: Landscapes, Asymmetric Exposure, Plants, Objects
- Website: https://nannahanninen.com/

Nanna Hänninen (born in 1973 in Rovaniemi, Finland) is a photographic artist who has worked as a professional since 1998. She lives and works in Kuopio, Finland.

== Education ==
Hänninen has studied at Lahti Institute of Design in Finland in 1994-1998 and Hochscule für Kunst und Gestaltung in Zürich in 1997–1998. She became Master of Arts (Photography) from University of Art and Design (UIAH) in Helsinki in 2002. She is part of The Helsinki School.

== Series ==
- Fear and security - Psychological and mental mechanisms of the society as well as the 9/11 incident in New York City are the starting point of the series. Aesthetically these works are very simple and silent, even minimalistic.
- The New Landscapes - In the series New Landscapes the photographs are taken from famous metropolises, buildings, factories, cemeteries, airports, towers - mostly strategically important places involving a mixture of lights in the scenery and a long exposure so that they become almost like short movies. The photographs have been re-worked by computer.
- Asymmetric Exposure - series about her admiration of the skyscraper's as well as understanding of the fragility of those and common peace agreements in the society.
- Plants / objects / paint - series about artificiality, alienation and reality.
