= Walter Runeberg =

Finnish sculptor (1838–1920)

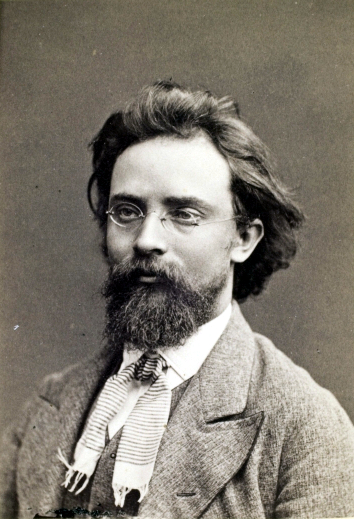
- Portrait photograph, 1870–1875
- Born: Walter Magnus Runeberg; 29 December 1838; Porvoo, Grand Duchy of Finland, Russian Empire
- Died: 23 December 1920 (aged 81); Helsinki, Finland
- Known for: Sculpture
- Movement: Neo-classical
- Spouse: Lina Elfving (m. 1867; died 1916)

Walter Magnus Runeberg (Finland Swedish: [ˈrʉːnebærj]; 29 December 1838 – 23 December 1920) was a Finnish neo-classical sculptor. He was the son of Finnish national epic poet Johan Ludvig Runeberg.

== Biography ==
Runeberg was born in Porvoo as the eldest son of J. L. Runeberg and his wife, Fredrika Tengström. He studied at the Academy of Fine Arts, Helsinki, and with sculptor Carl Eneas Sjöstrand. From 1858 through 1869 he studied at the Royal Danish Academy of Fine Arts in Copenhagen under Herman Wilhelm Bissen, acquiring a clear influence from the neoclassical style of Bissen's master Bertel Thorvaldsen. He married Lina Elfving (1841–1916) in 1867. They had six children.

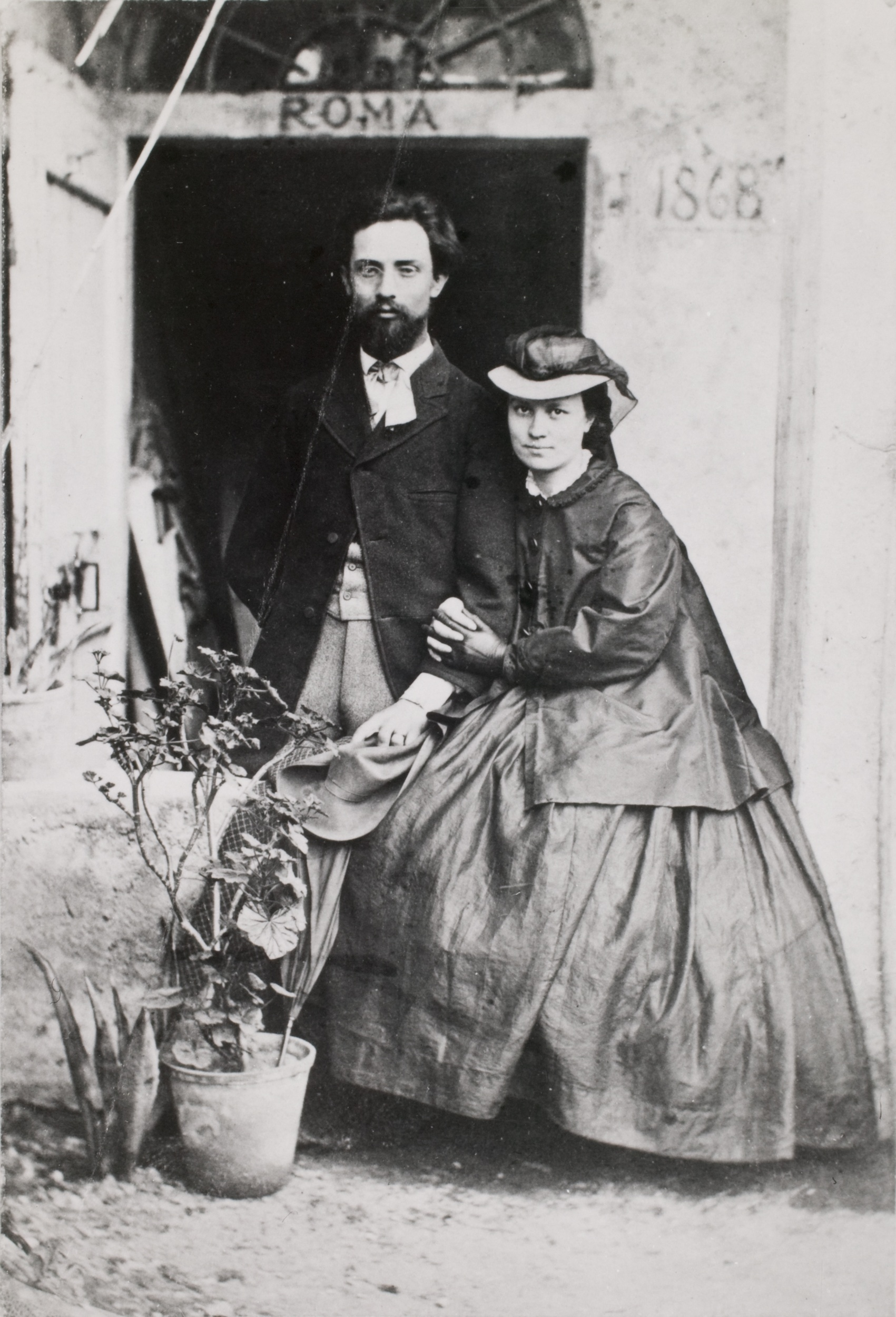
With his wife Lina in Rome, 1868

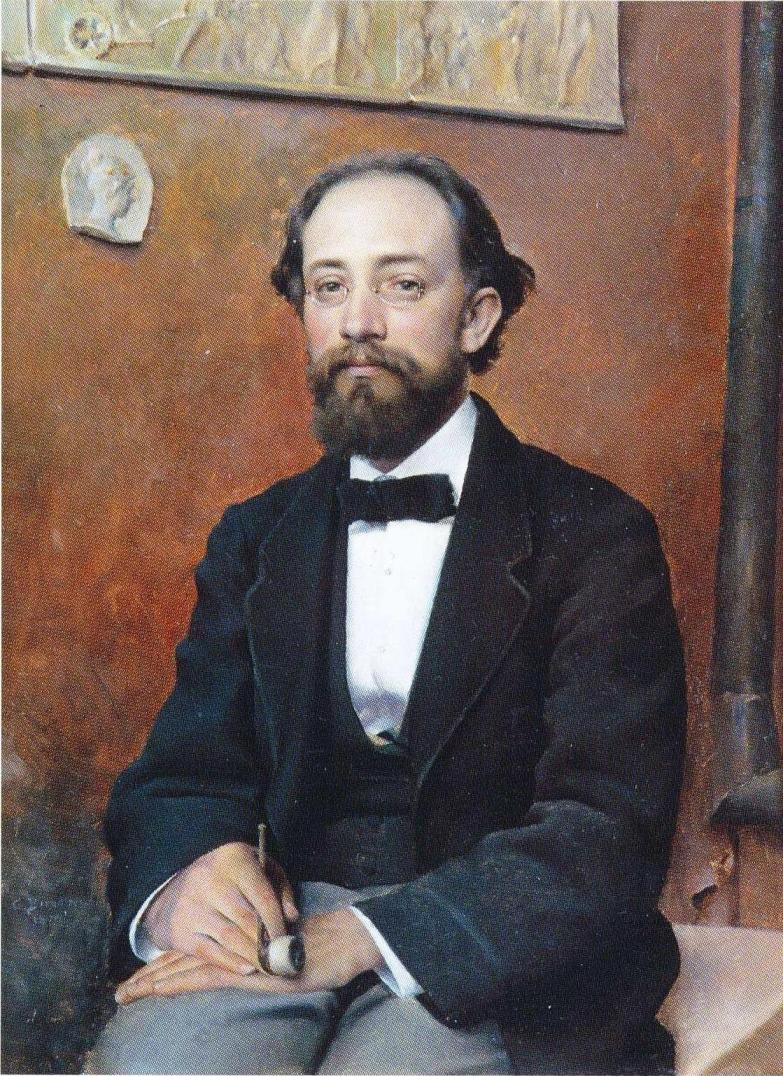
Portrait by Gunnar Berndtson, 1879

After periods living and working in Rome (1862–1876) and Paris (1876–1893), Runeberg produced many of Helsinki's best-known examples of monumental public art. The largest is the Alexander II Monument in Senate Square, a commission awarded jointly to Runeberg and sculptor Johannes Takanen, then completed by Runeberg after Takanen's death in 1885. The pedestal features several allegorical figures. Notably, the figure representing Law is a version of the Suomi-neito, the Finnish maiden, here cloaked in bearskin.

Runeberg was also frequently commissioned for private assignments. These include the bust of Ellan de la Chapelle in Paris in 1880, who became the wife of artist Albert Edelfelt in 1888.

From 1893 to 1896, Runeberg worked in Copenhagen, Denmark.

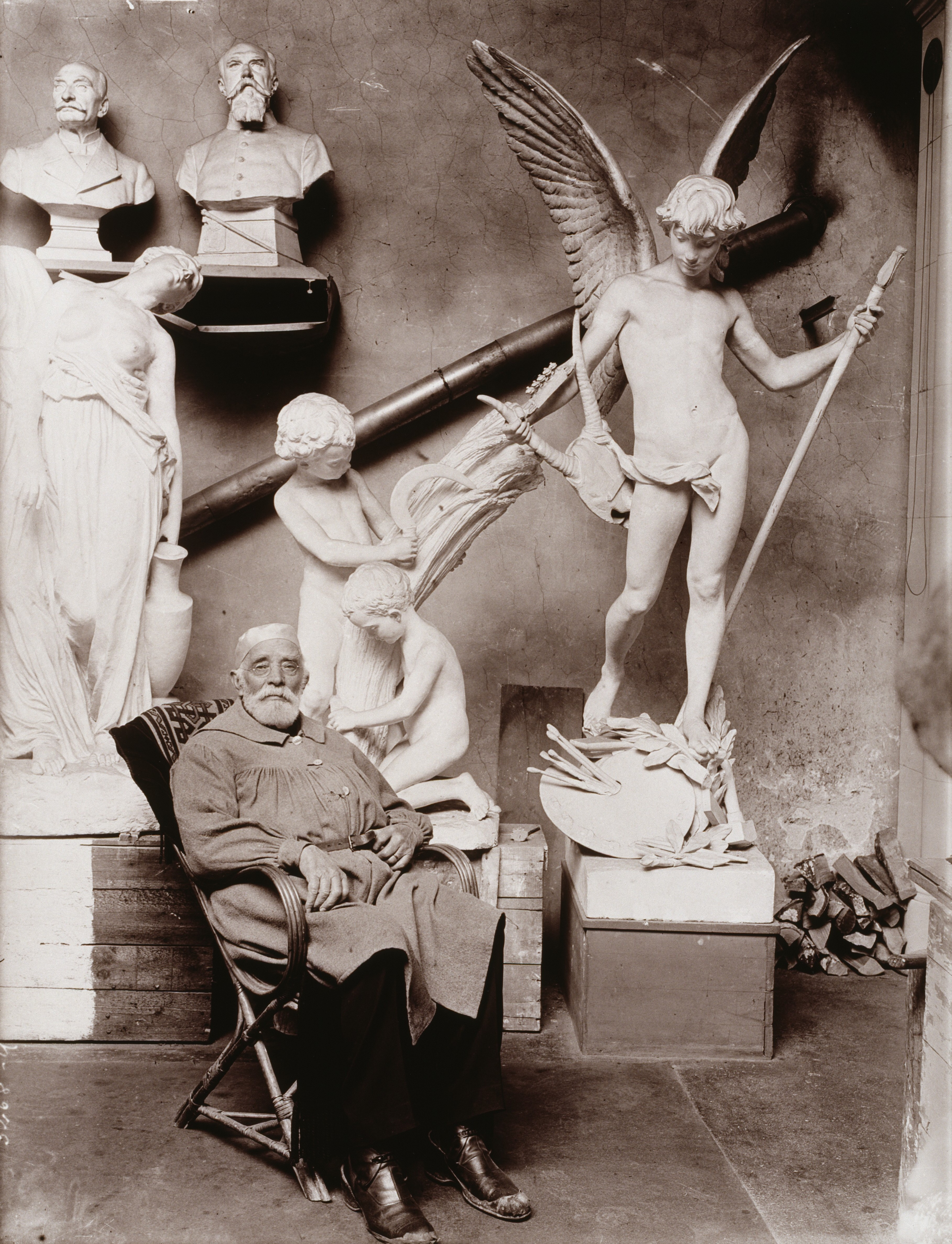
Runeberg in his studio, 1910s

He is buried in the Hietaniemi Cemetery in Helsinki.

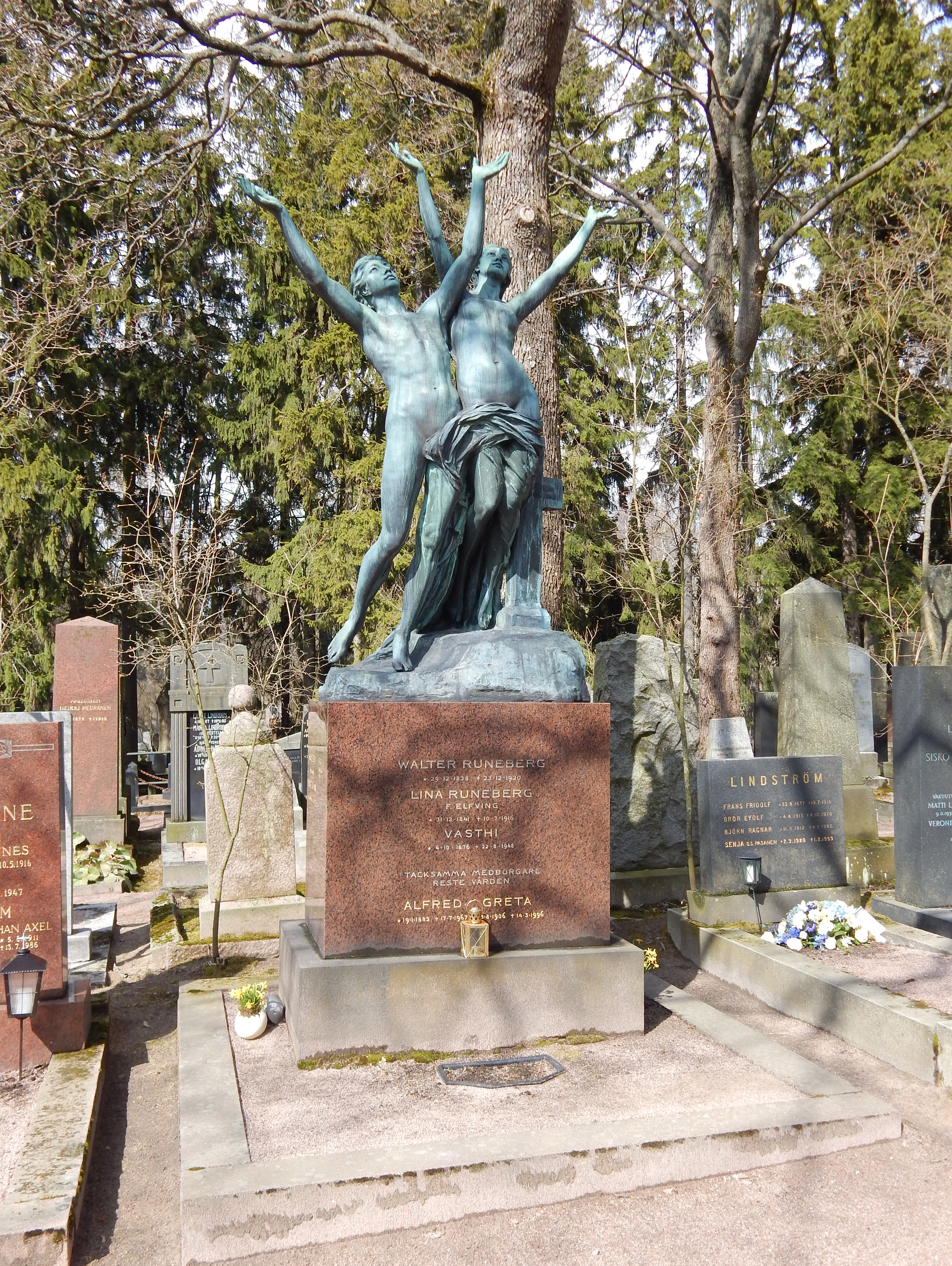
Runeberg family grave, Hietaniemi Cemetery, Helsinki

== Works ==
=== Statue of Alexander II ===
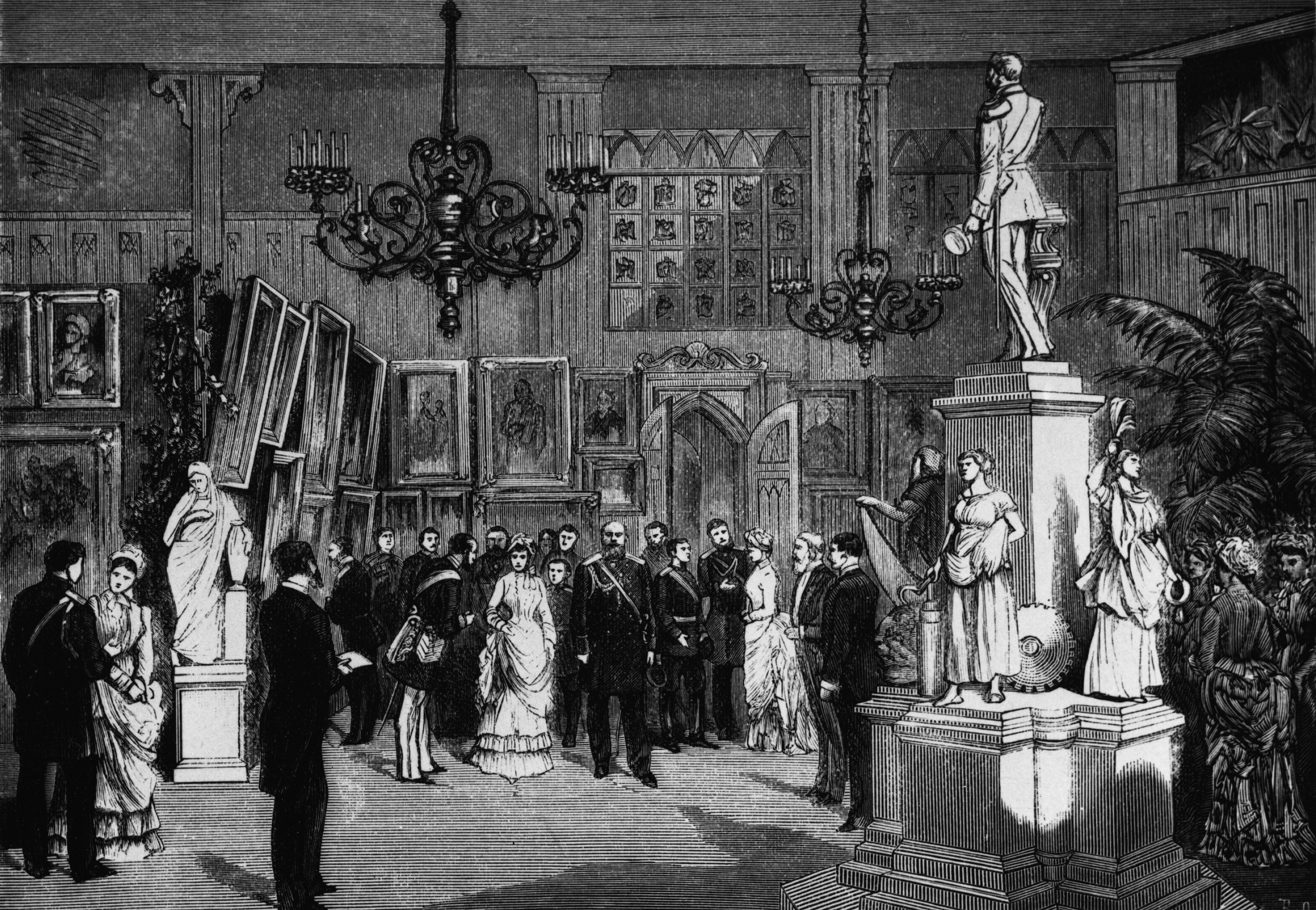
Alexander III being shown a work-in-progress of the statue of Alexander II on 9 August 1885 at House of Nobility

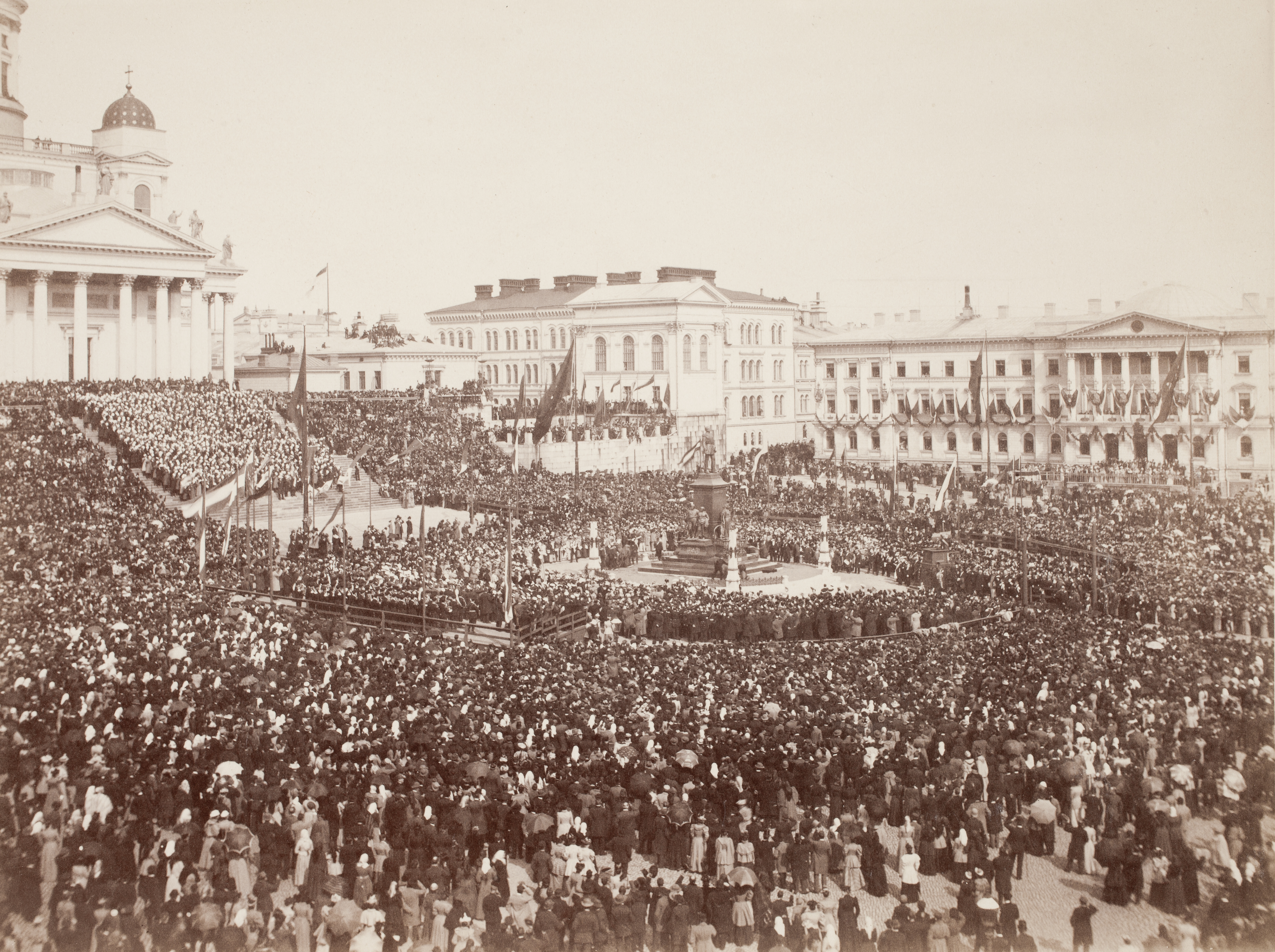
Reveal of the statue of Alexander II on 29 April 1894 at Senate Square

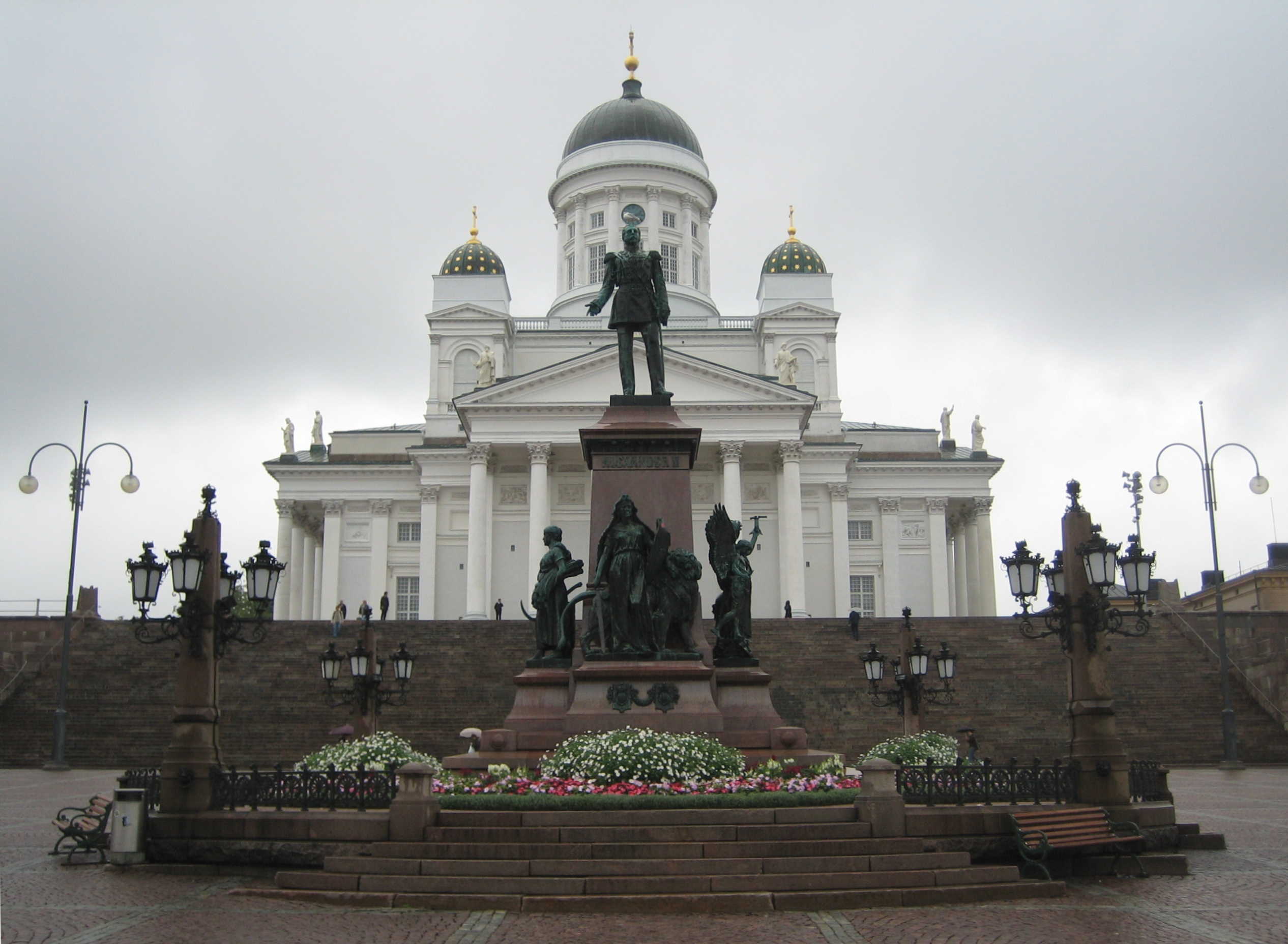
The statue with its accompanying structure

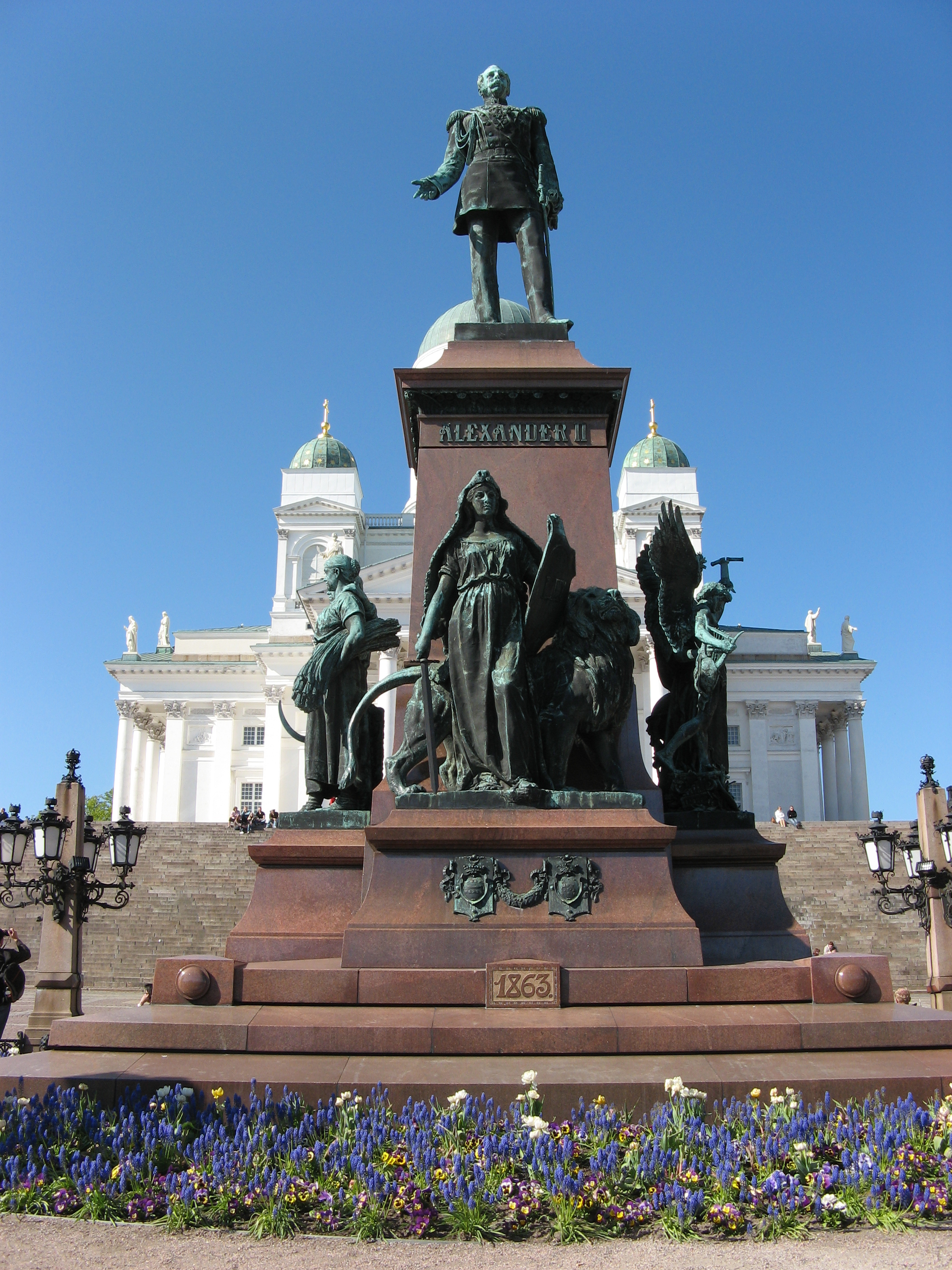
The statue itself up close from the front

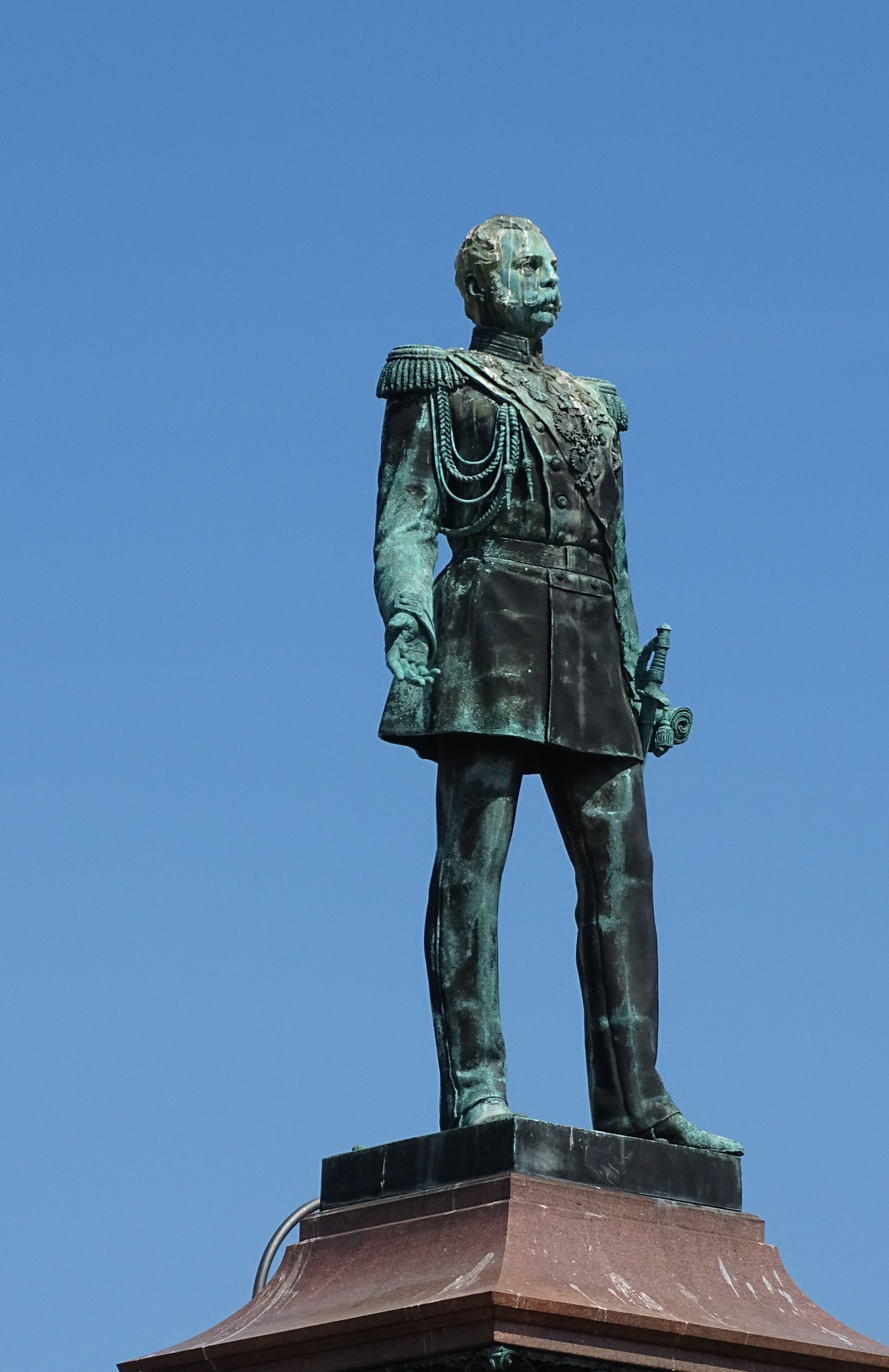
Alexander II from the side

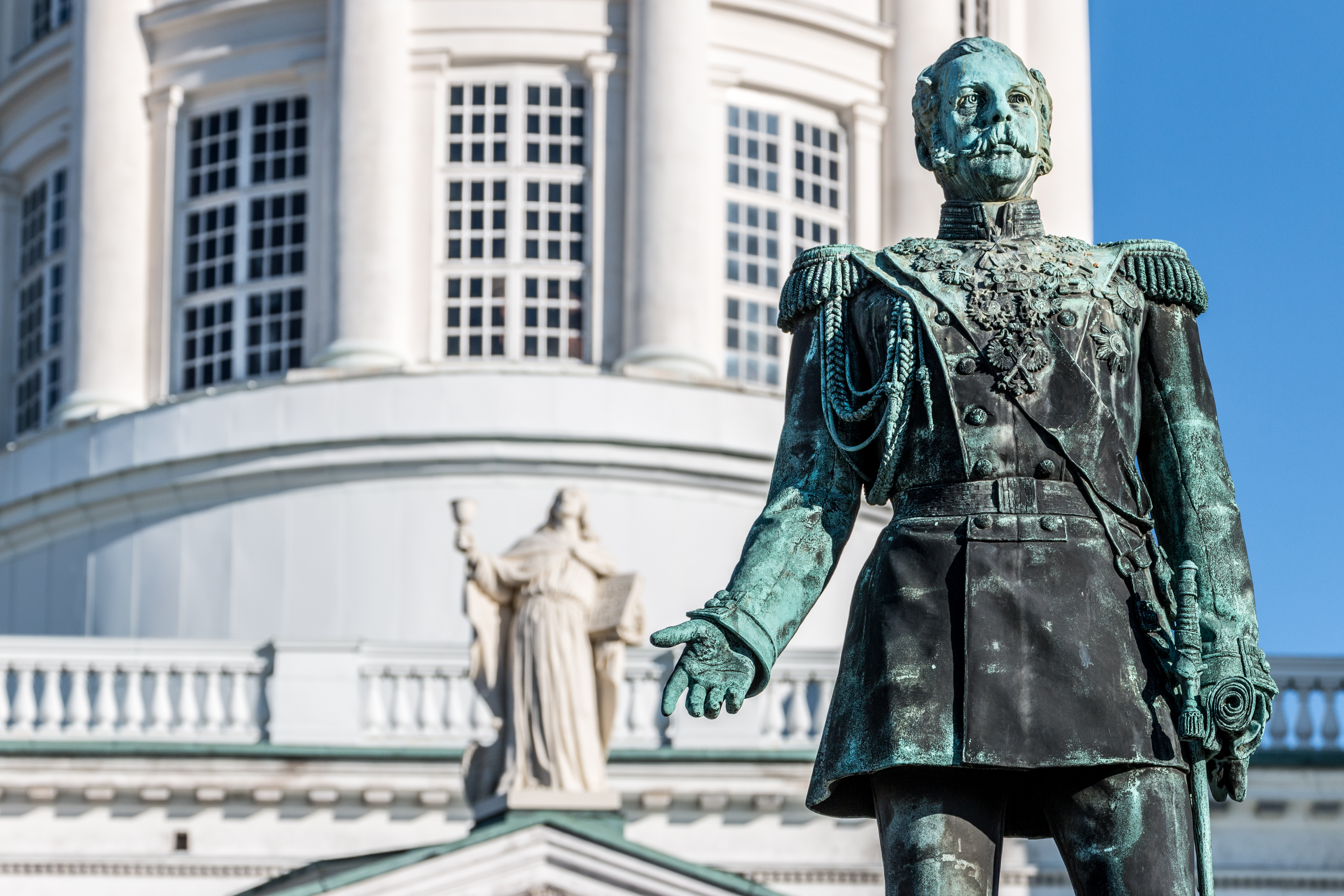
Close-up from the front with Helsinki Cathedral's John the Apostle in the background

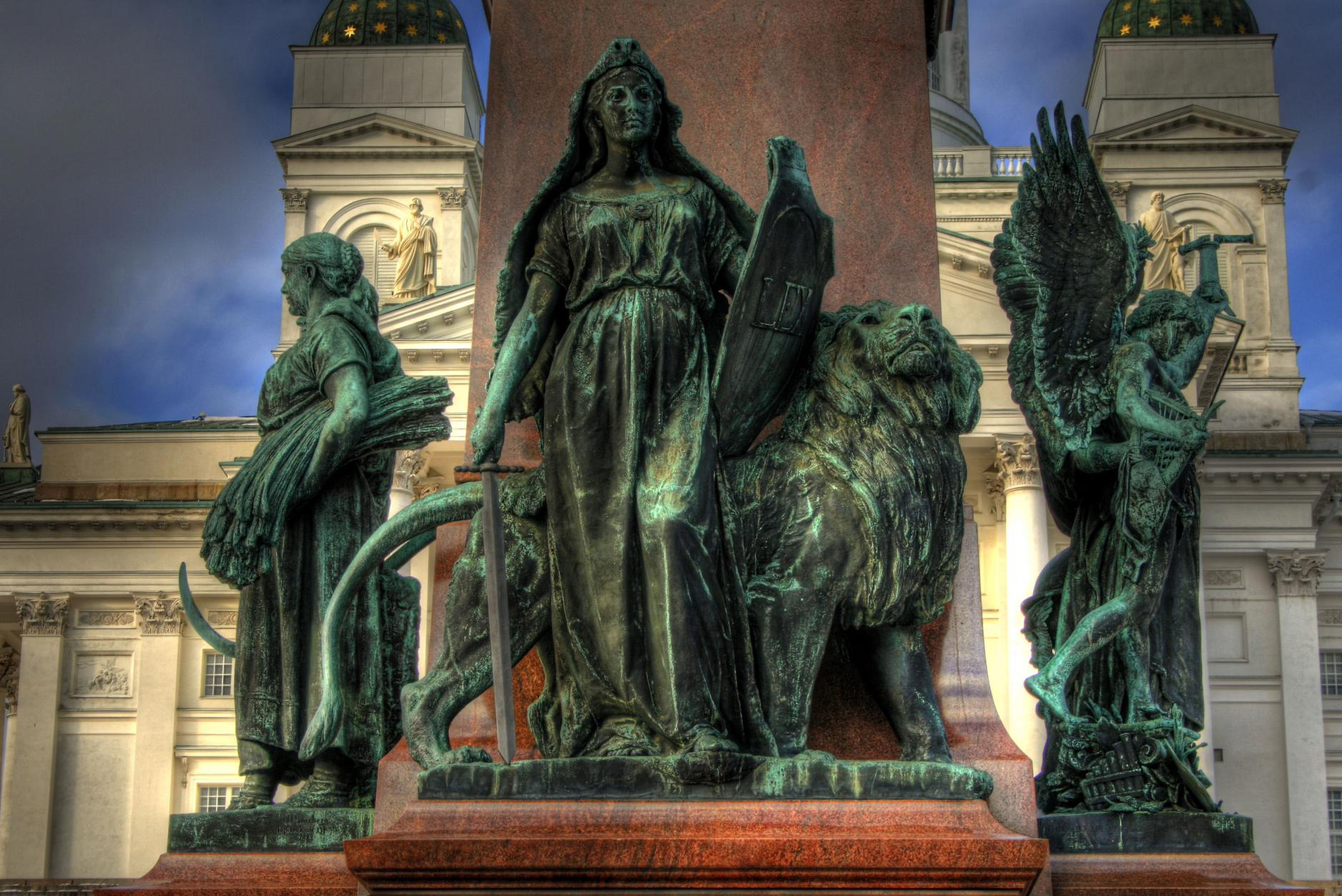
Statues at the bottom, with the four sides representing Law, Trade, Peace and Labor

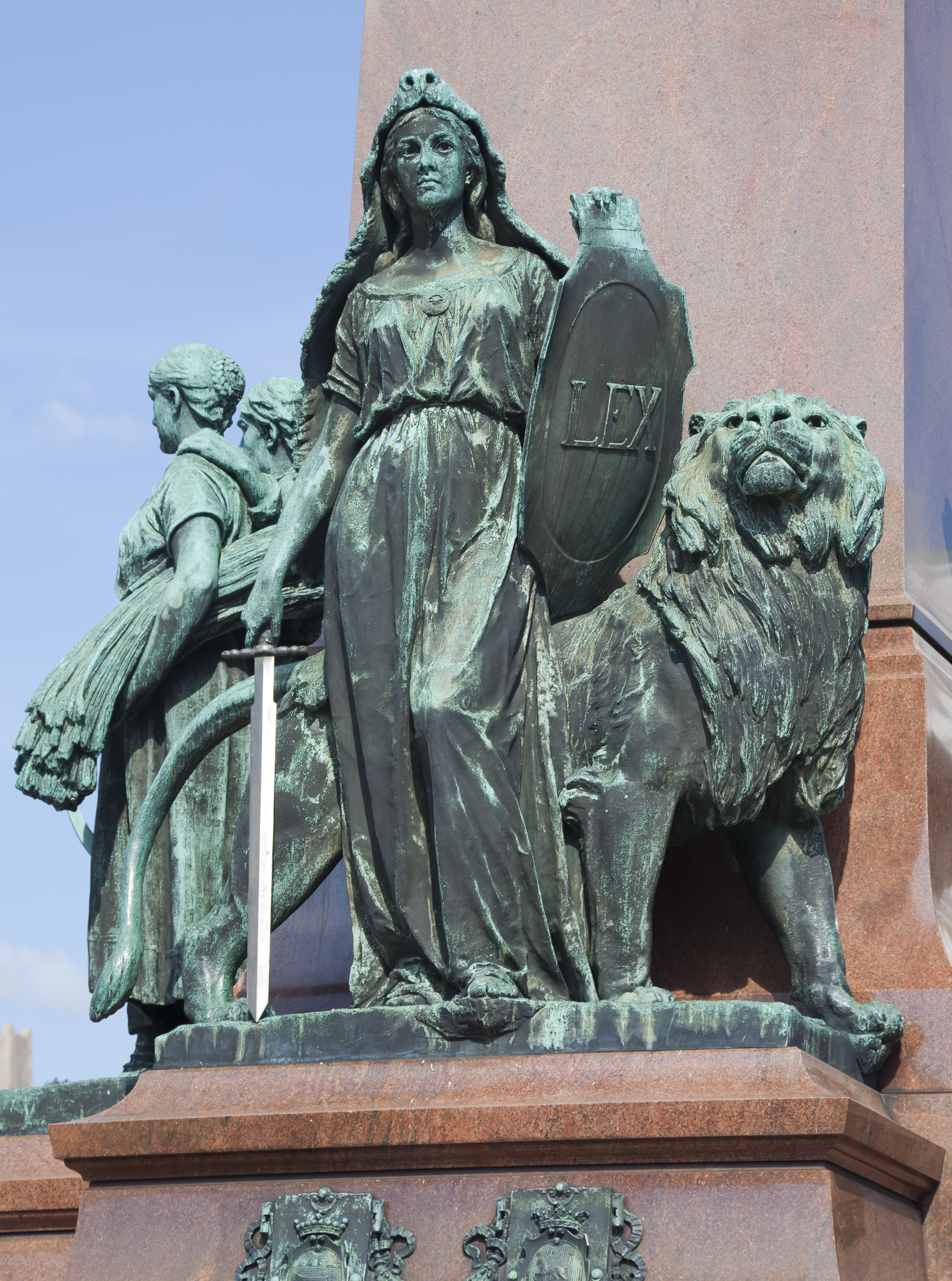
Law

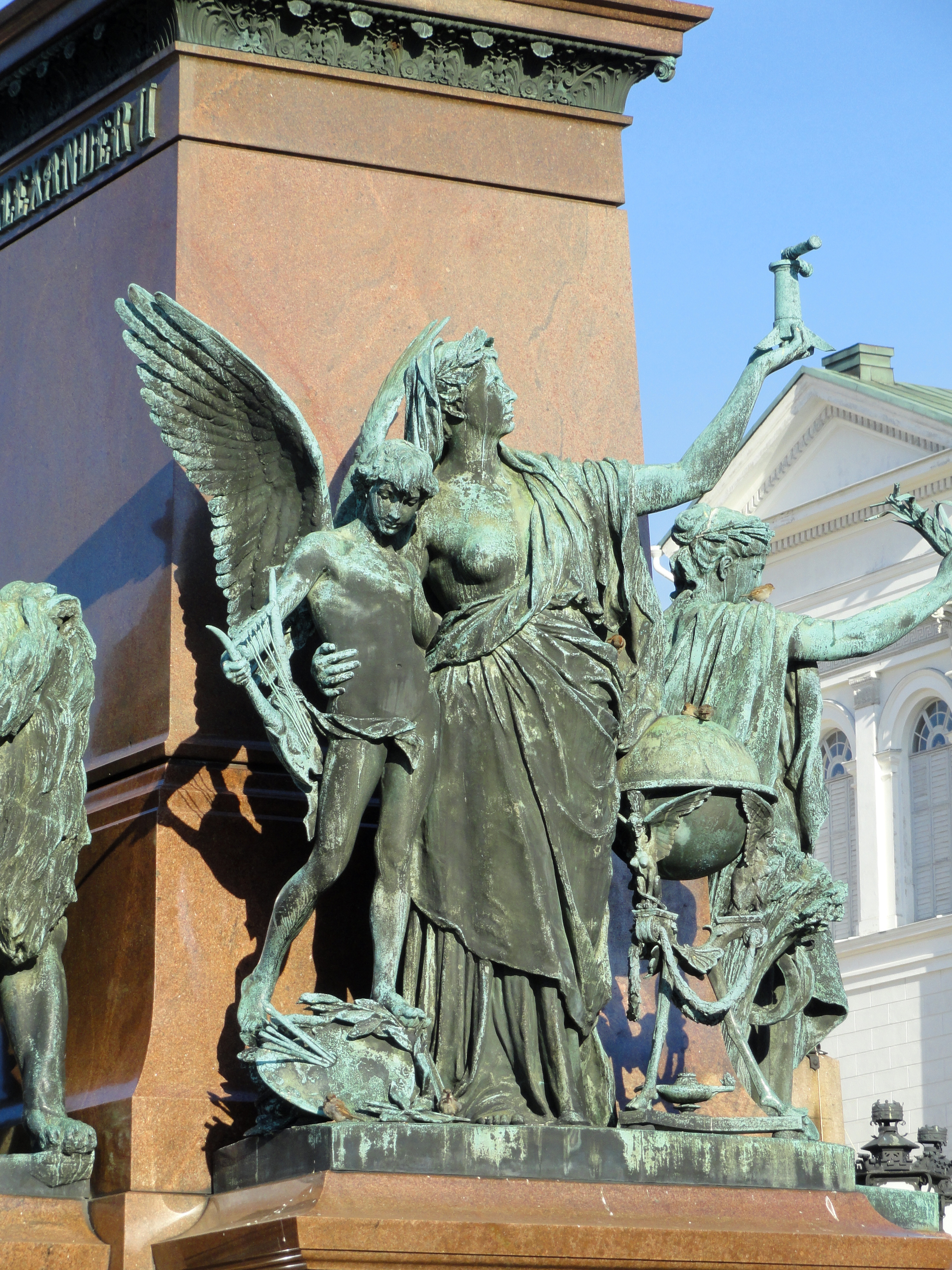
Trade

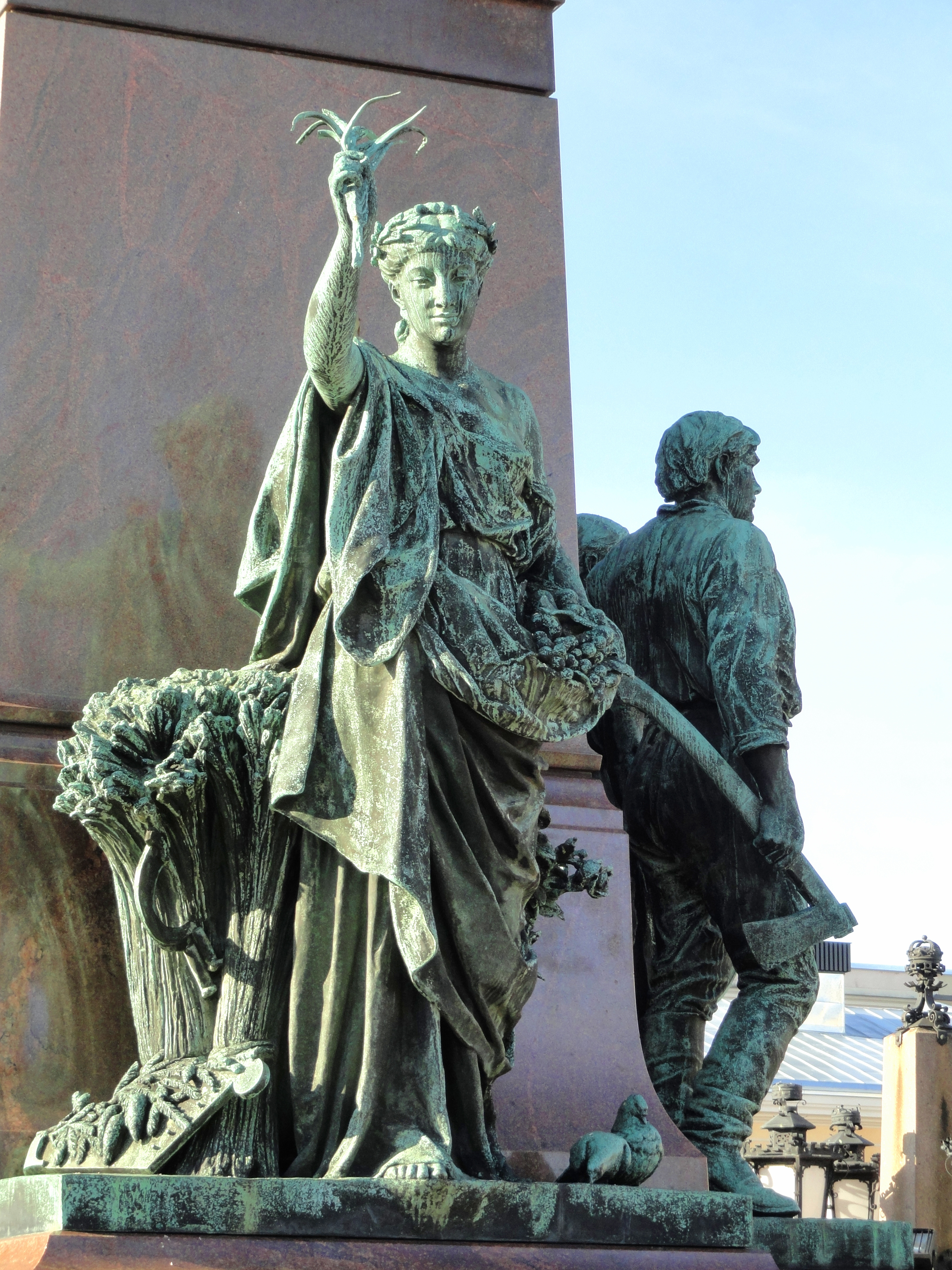
Peace

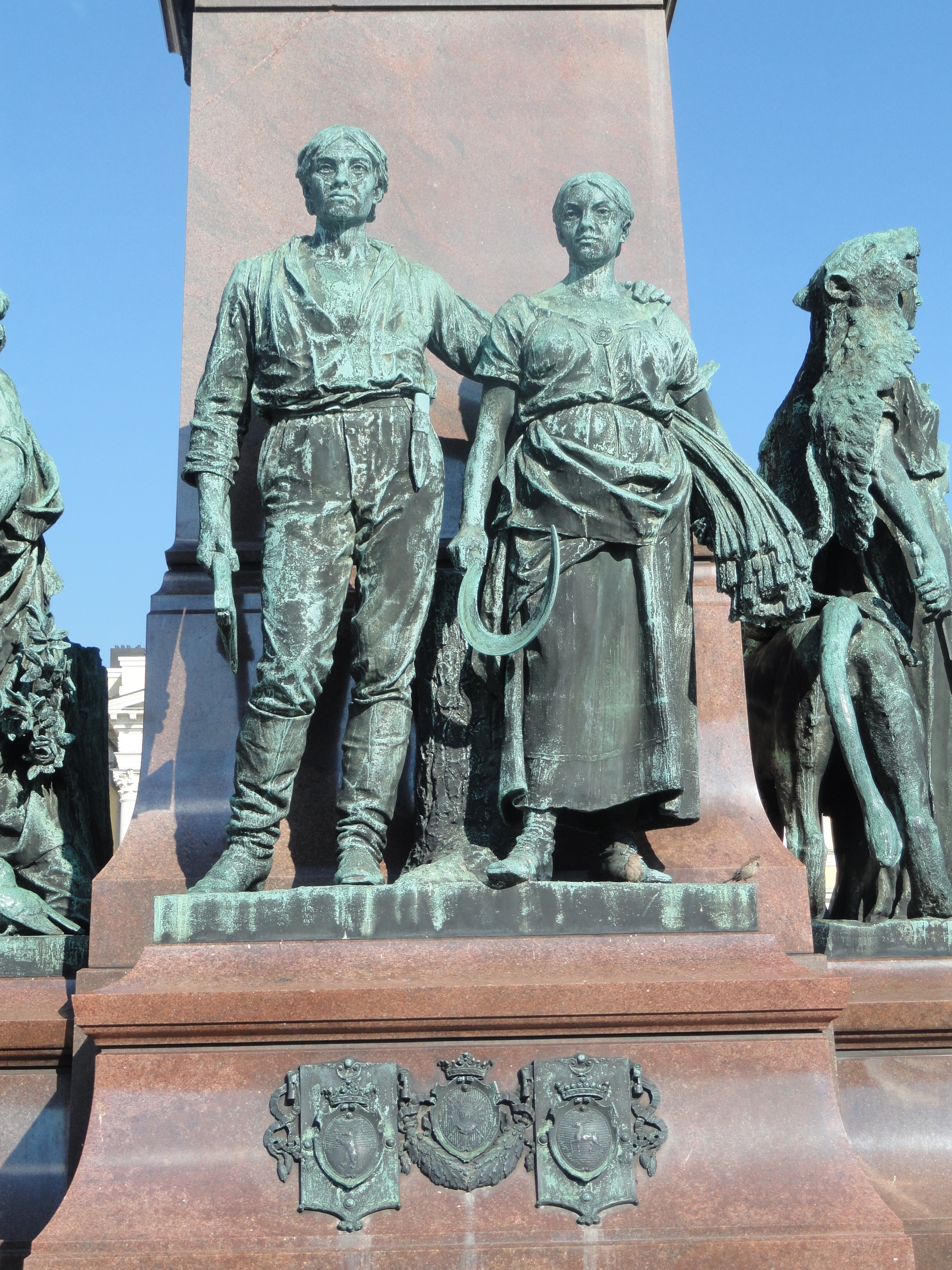
Labor

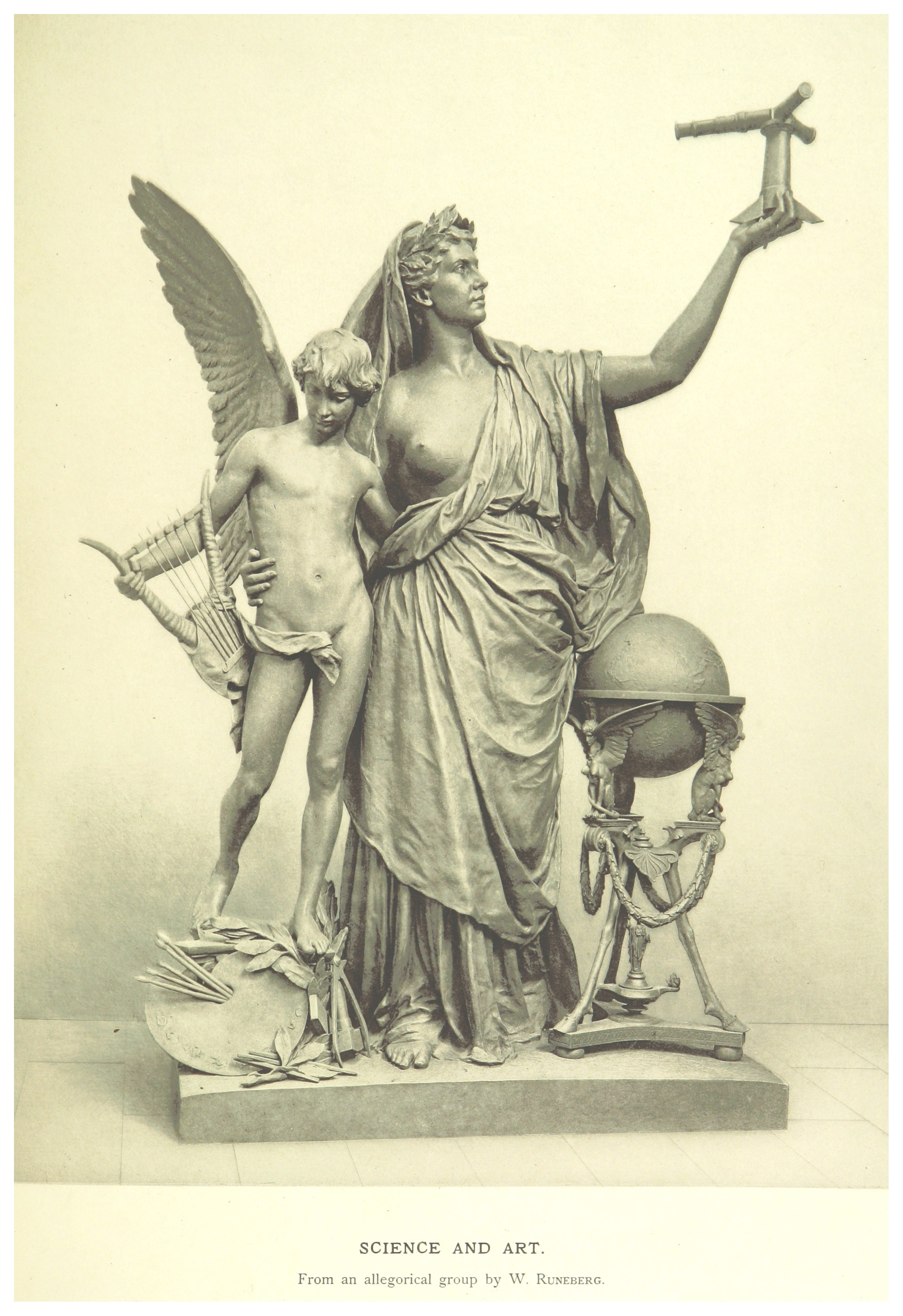
Model for Trade, called Science and Art

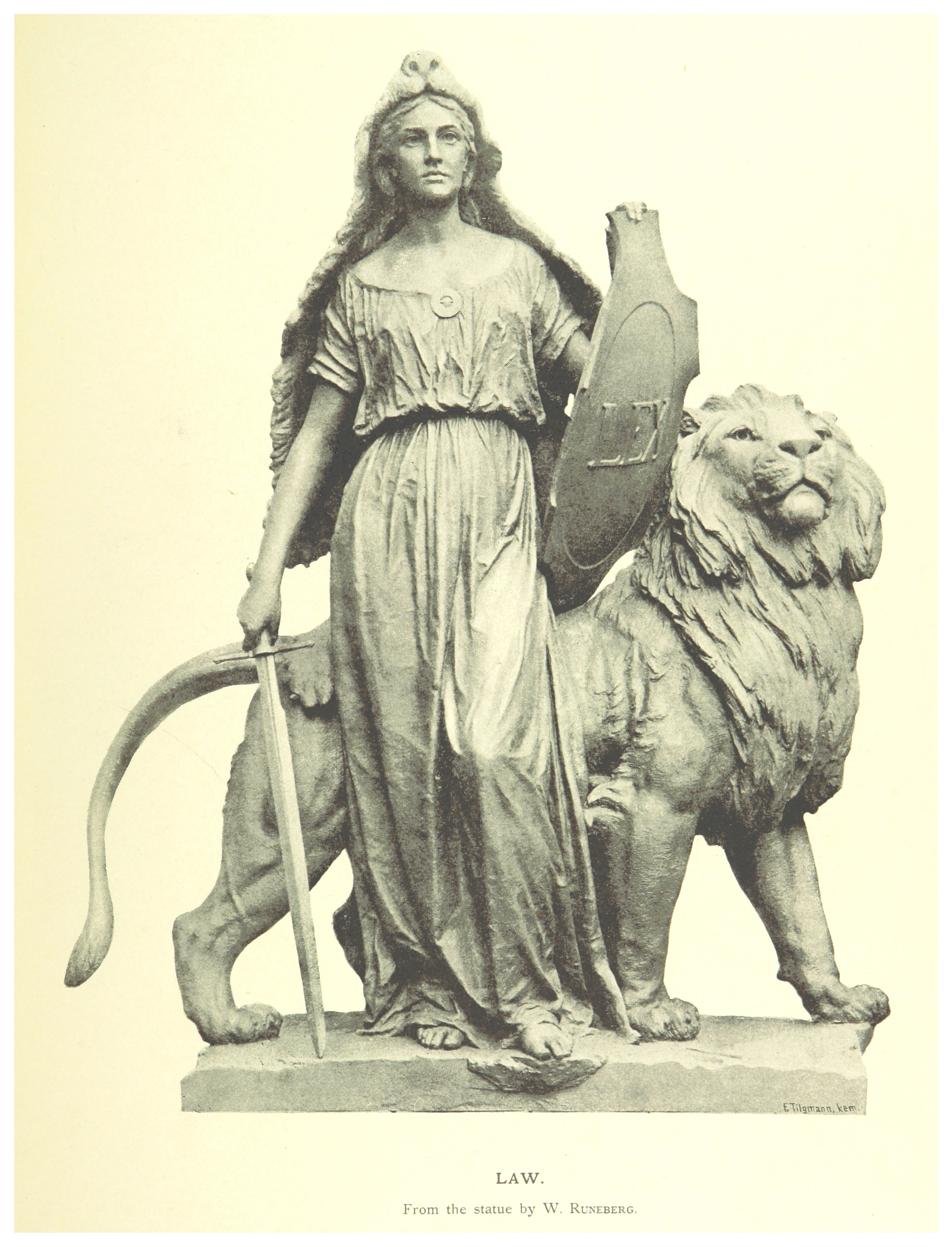
Model for Law

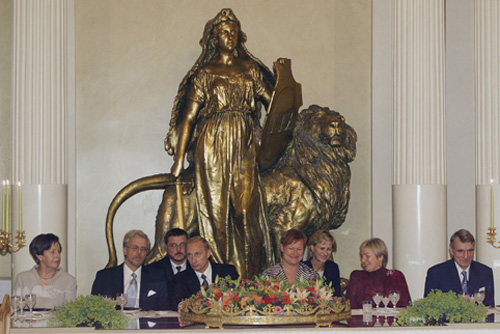
One of the two copies of Law displayed at the Presidential Palace (pictured in 2001)

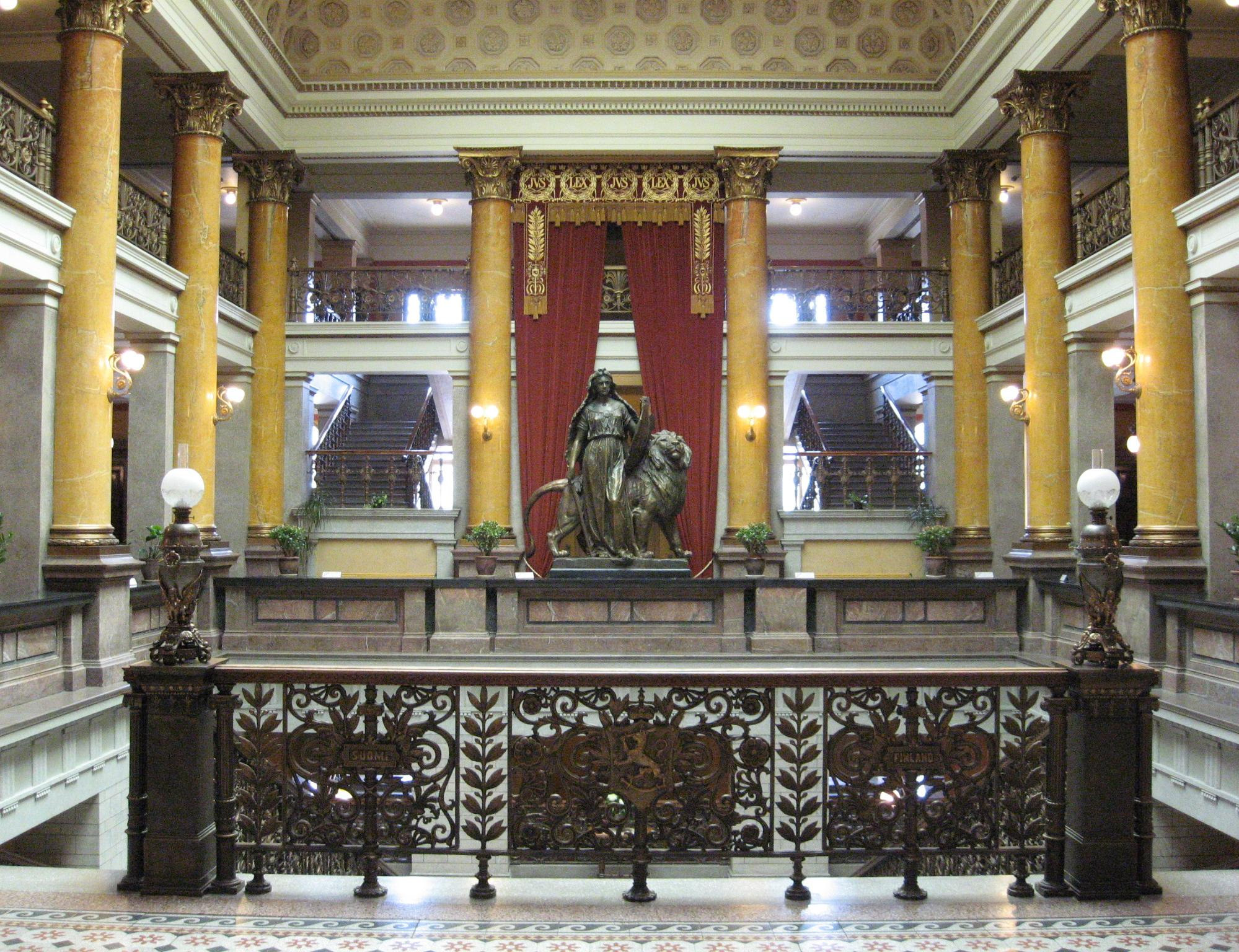
The other copy at the House of the Estates

=== Other notable works ===
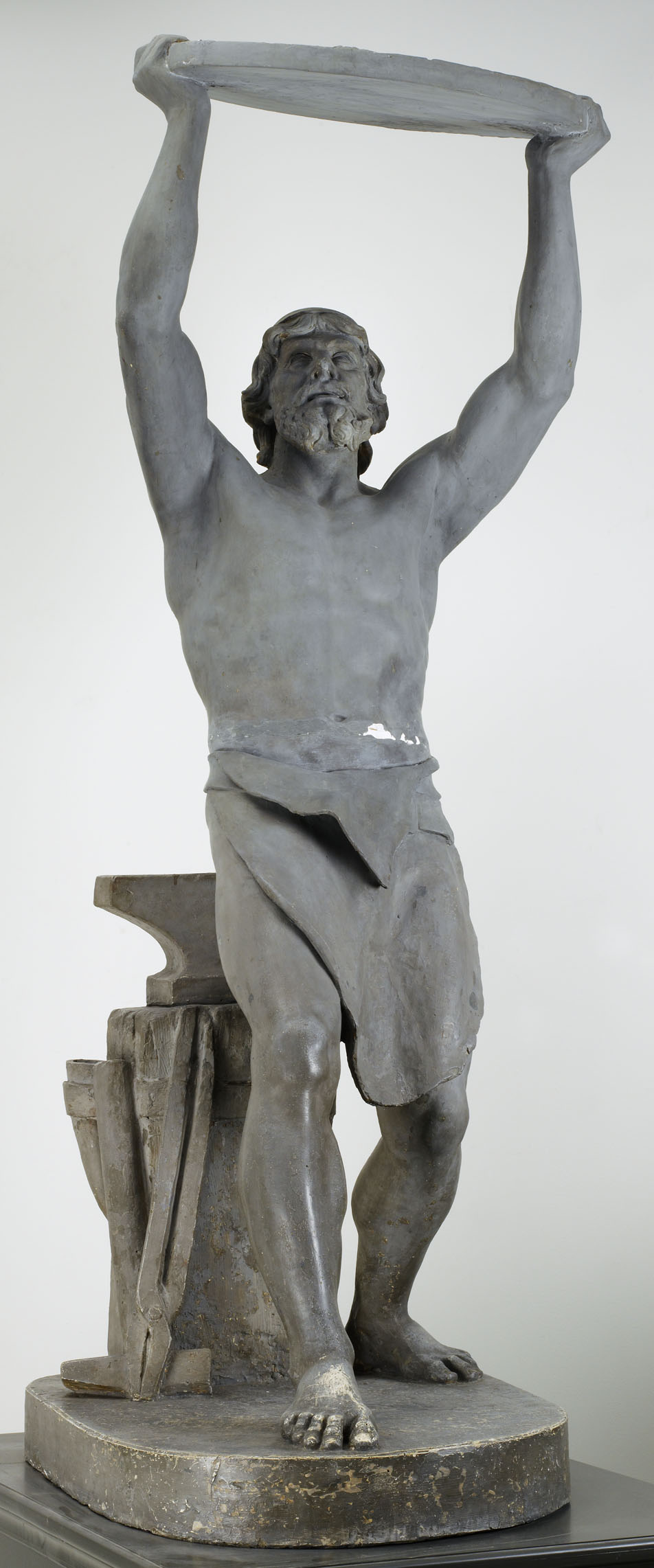
Ilmarinen Forging the Moon, 1866

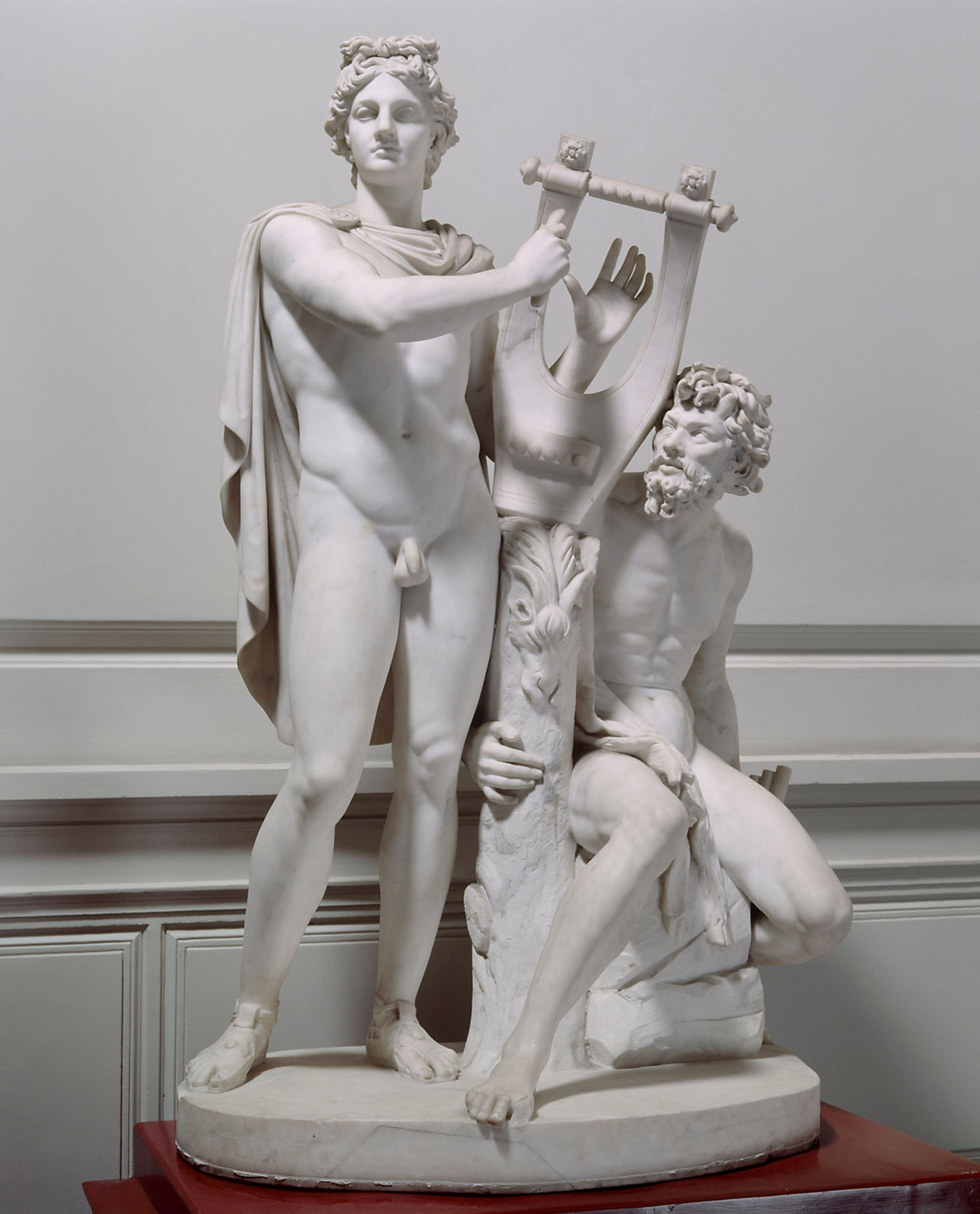
Apollo and Marsyas at the entry lobby of Ateneum, 1874

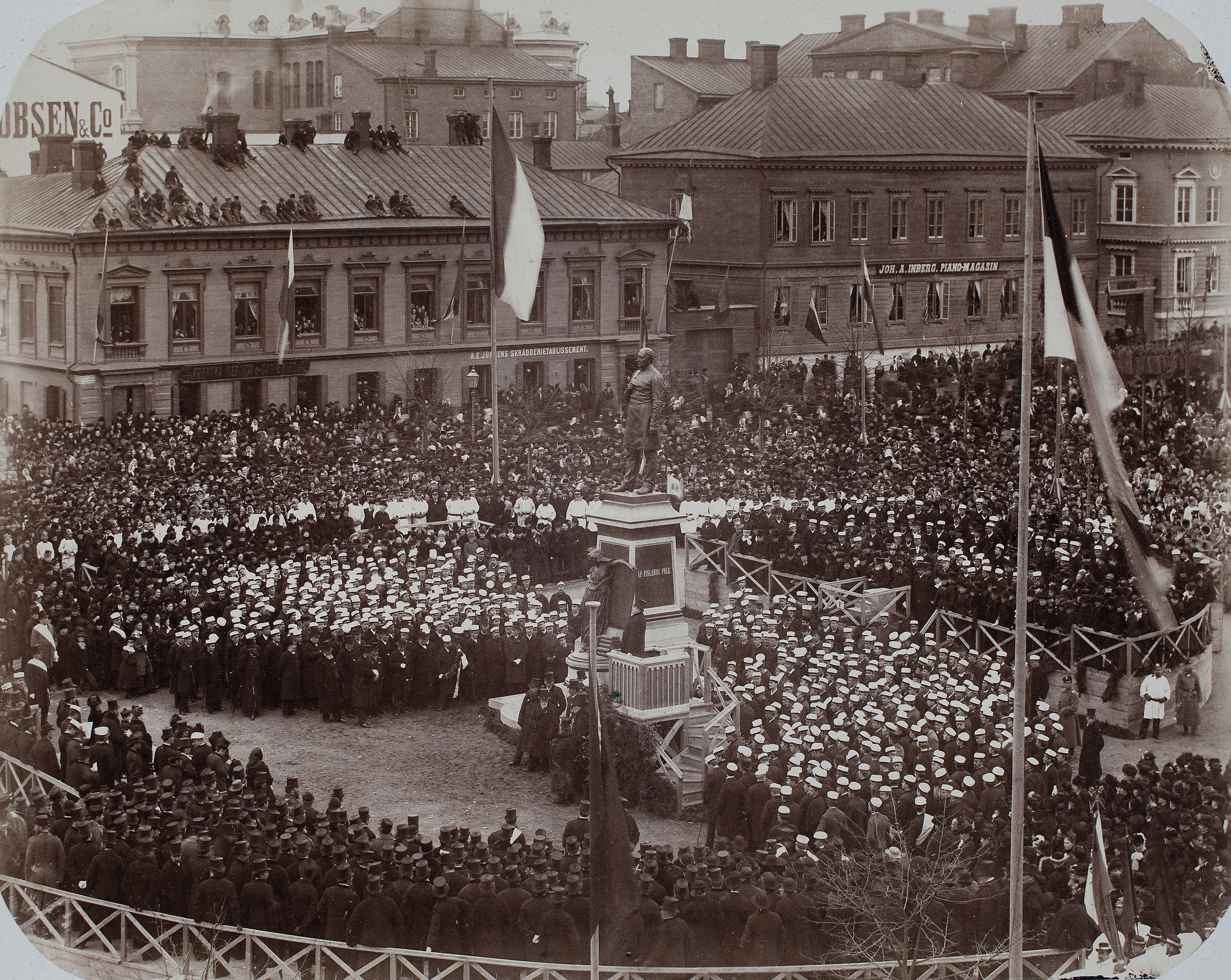
1885 reveal of the statue of Johan Ludvig Runeberg, his father

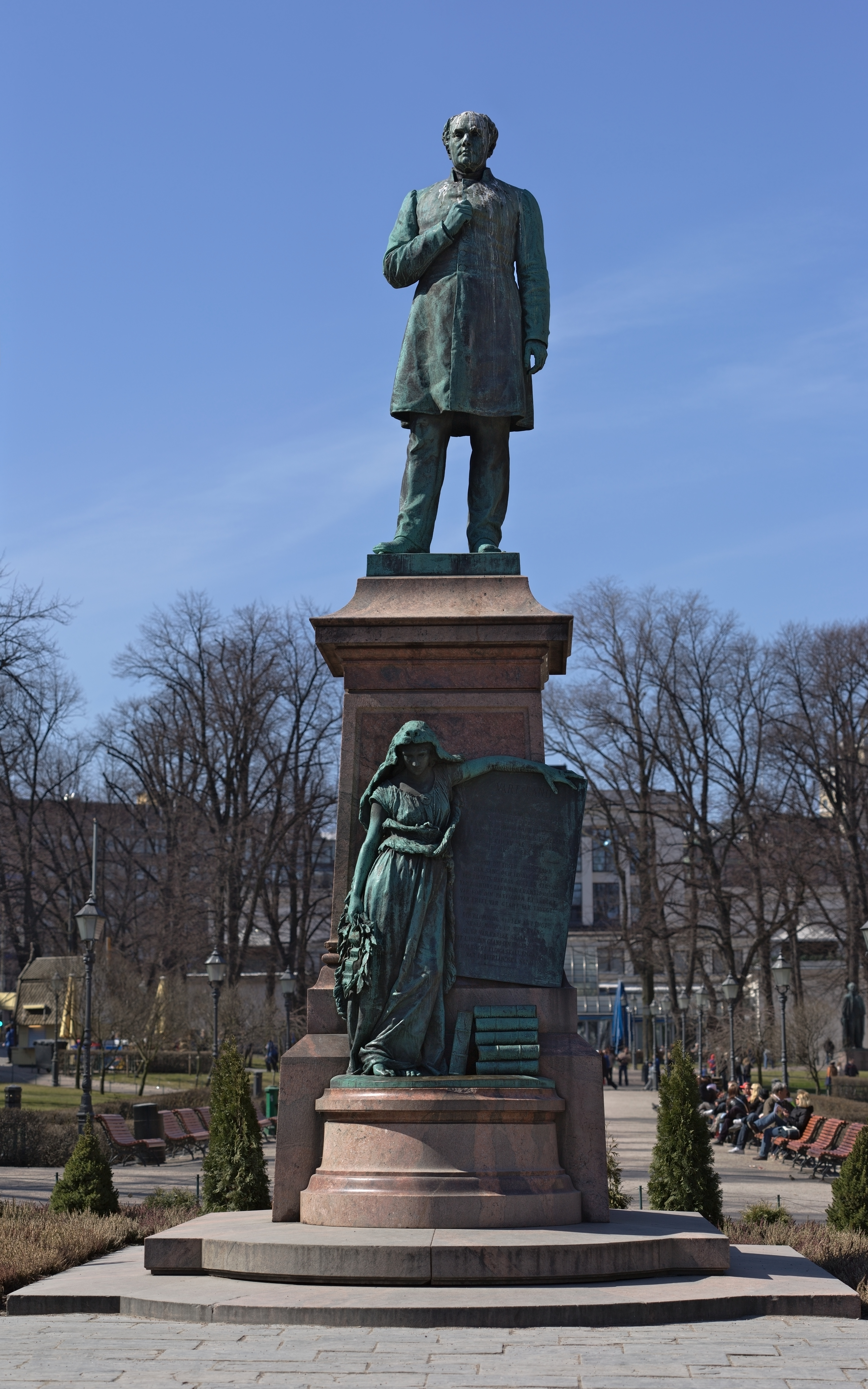
Johan Ludvig Runeberg, with the Finnish national anthem Vårt land by him inscribed at the bottom

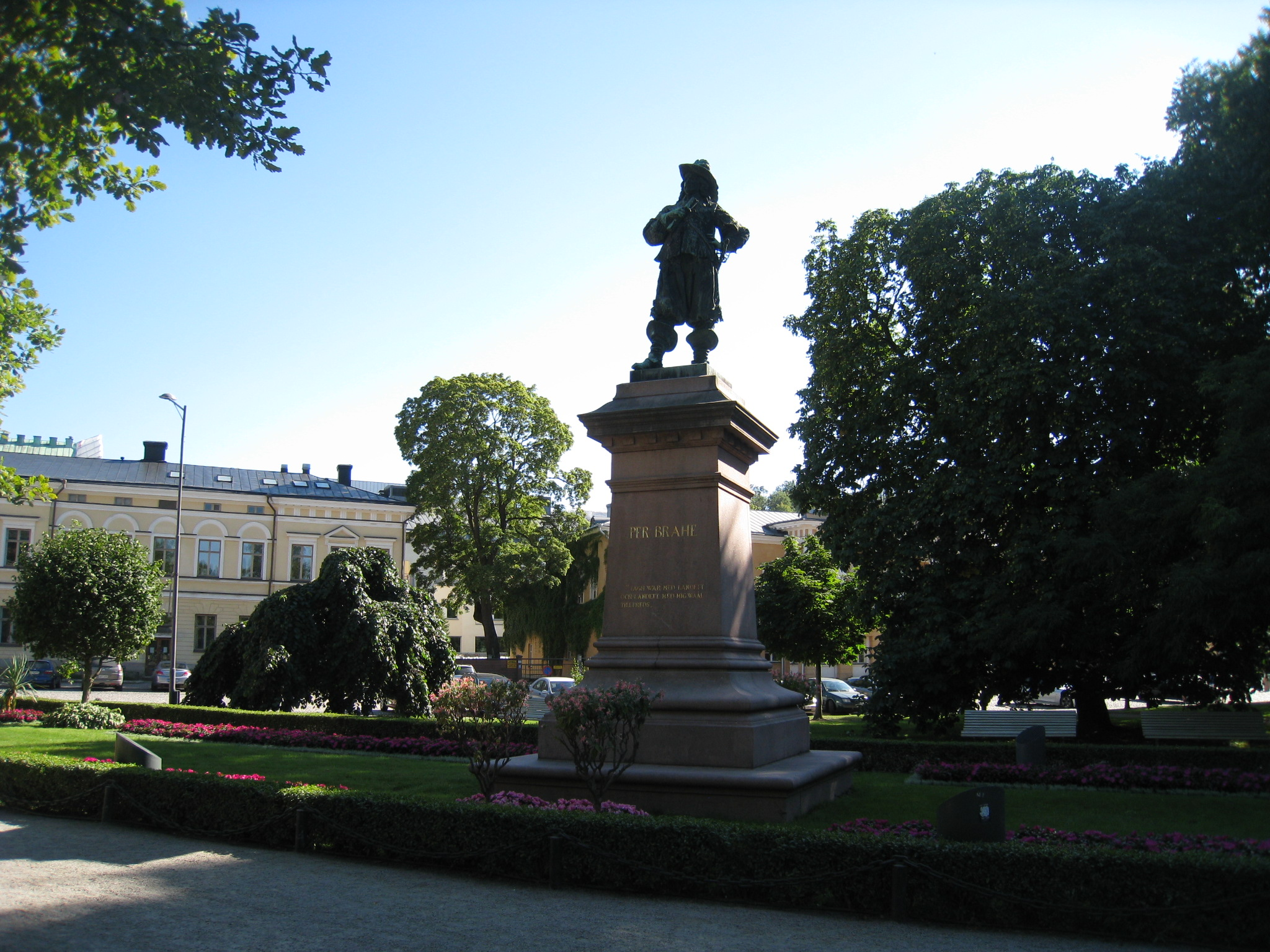
Per Brahe Statue in Turku, 1888

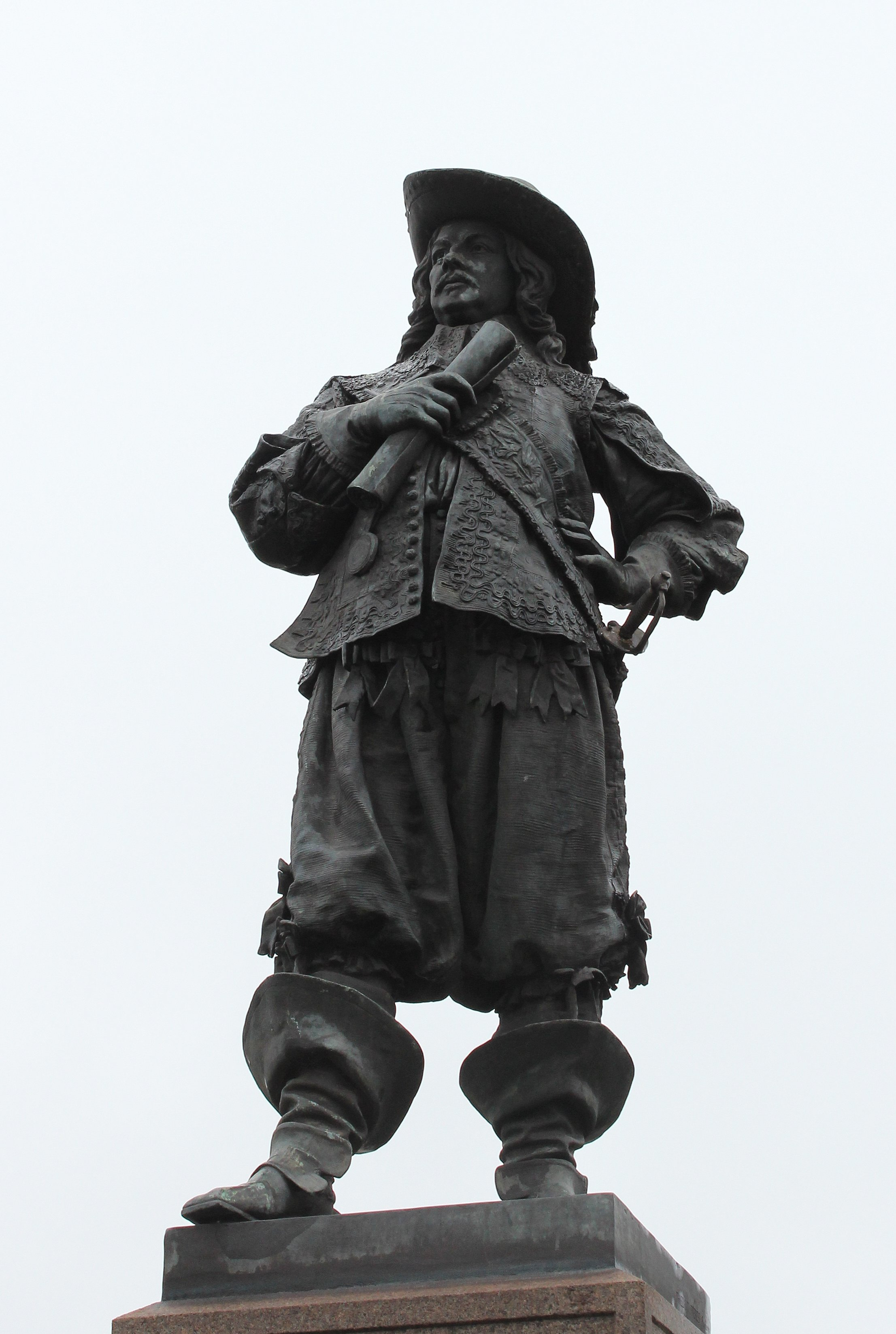
Slightly larger version of the same Per Brahe statue in Raahe from the same year

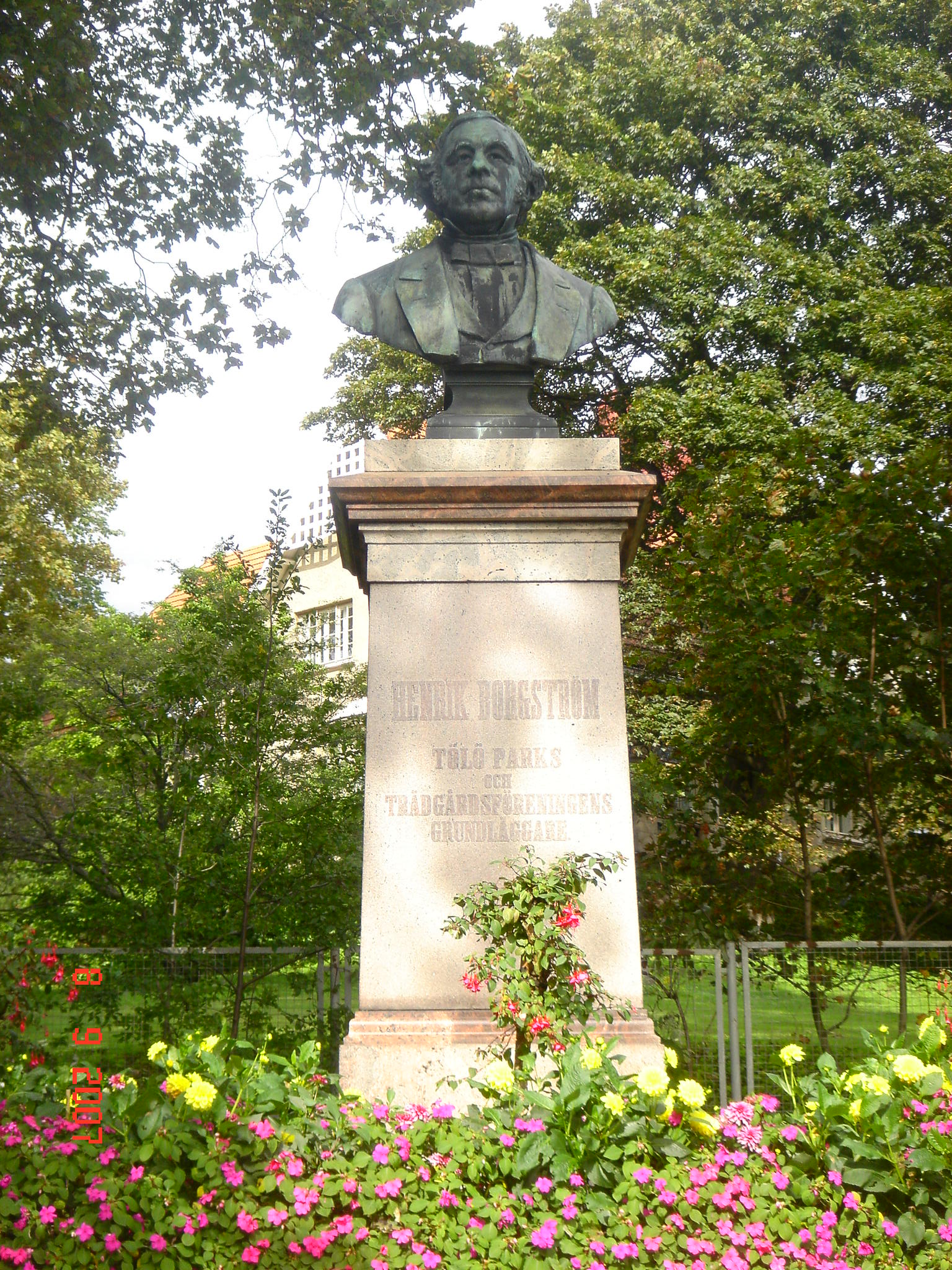
Henrik Borgström monument, Taka-Töölö district of Helsinki, 1888

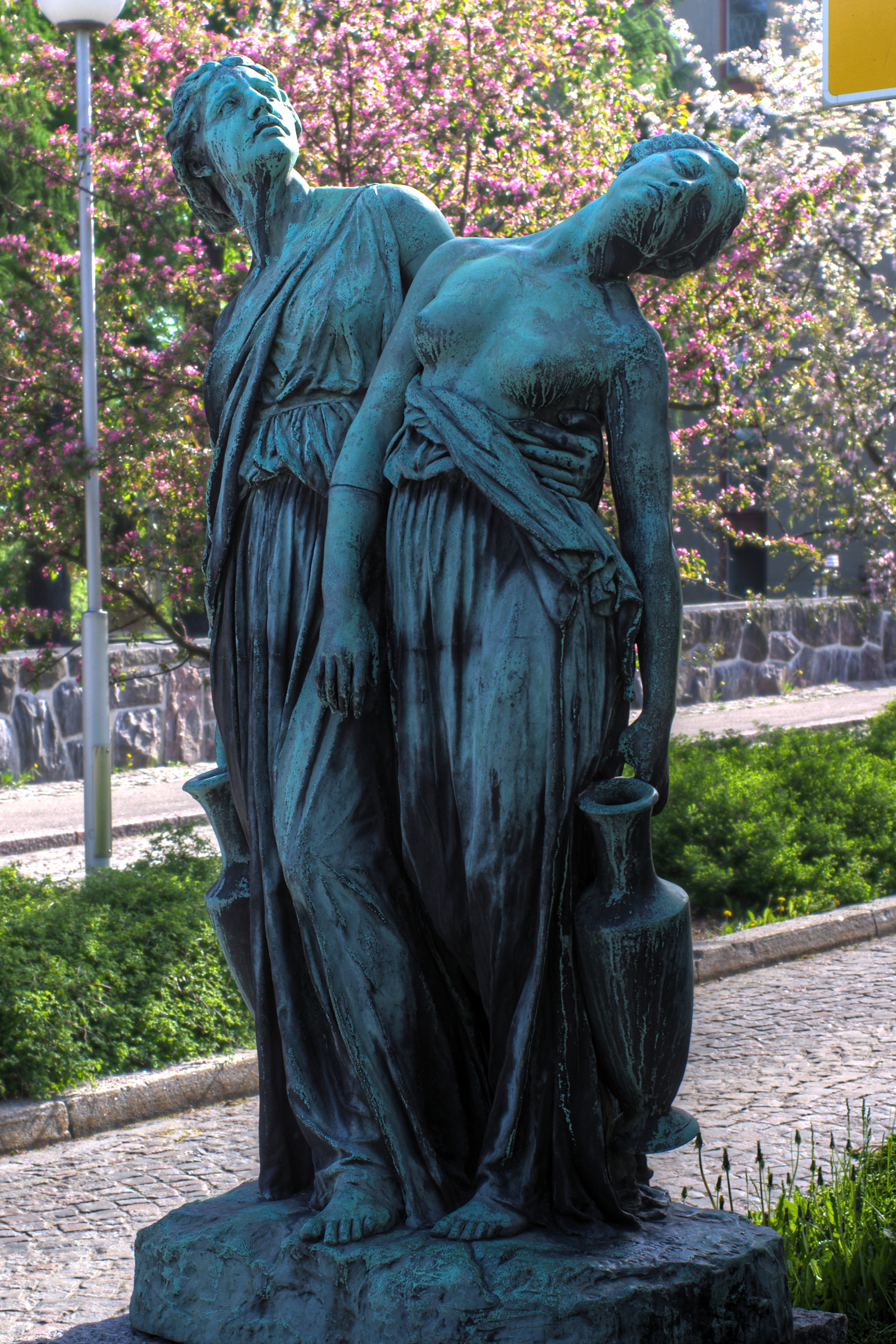
Two bronze Danaids in the Meilahti neighborhood of Helsinki, 1893

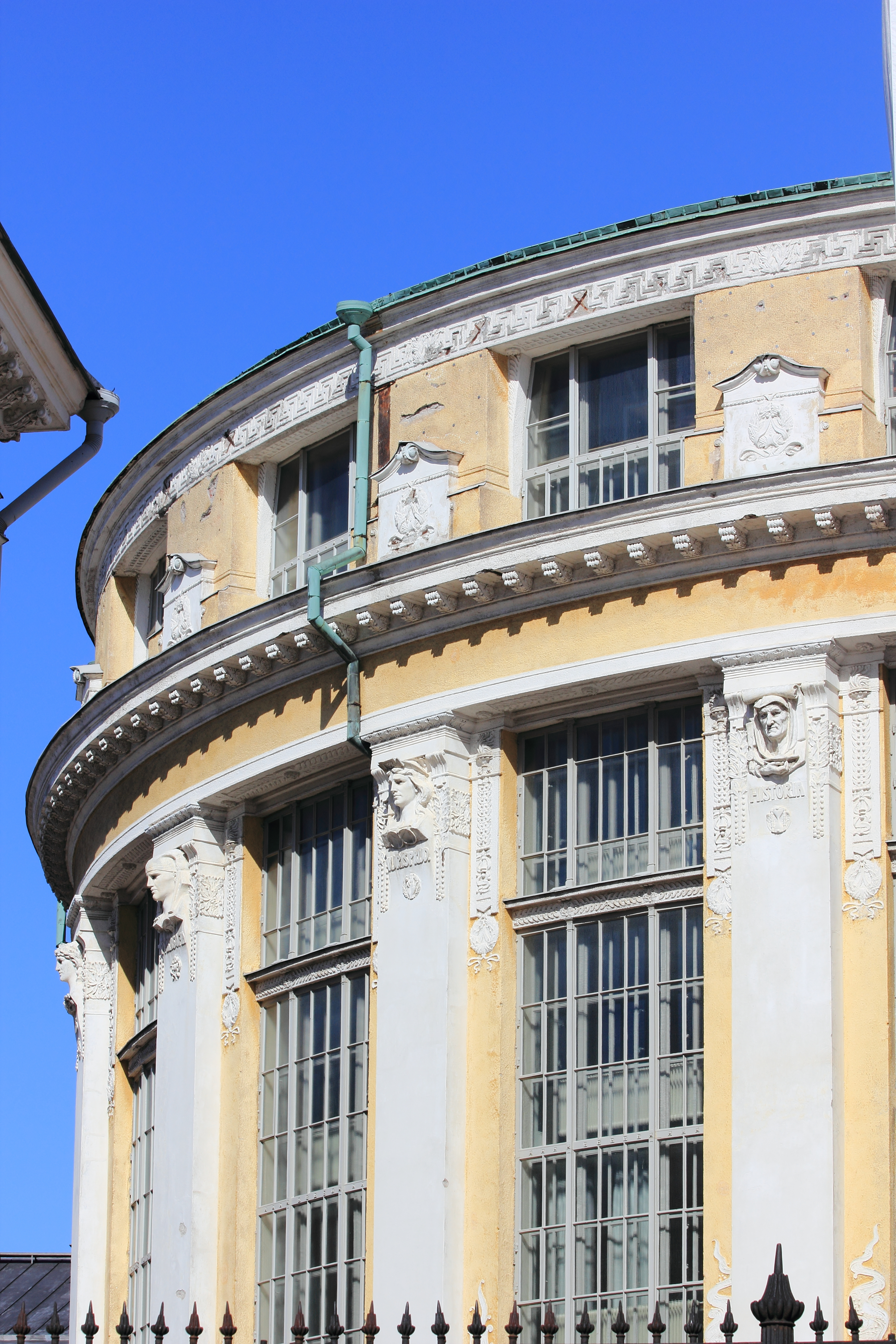
Allegorical figures on the exterior of the rotunda, National Library of Finland, with fellow sculptor Karl Magnus Mellgren, 1905

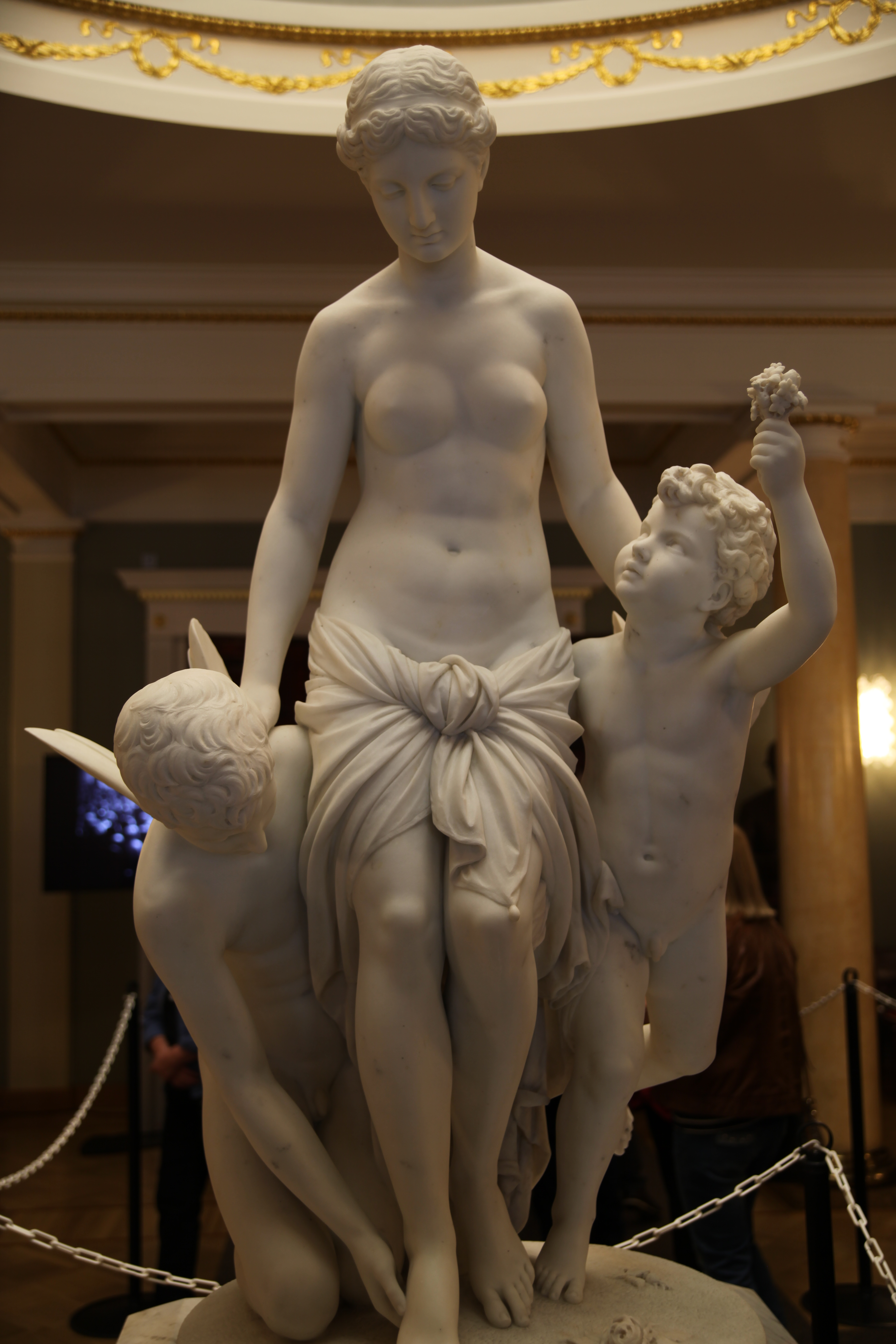
Psyche carried by Zephyrs at the Presidential Palace, 1872

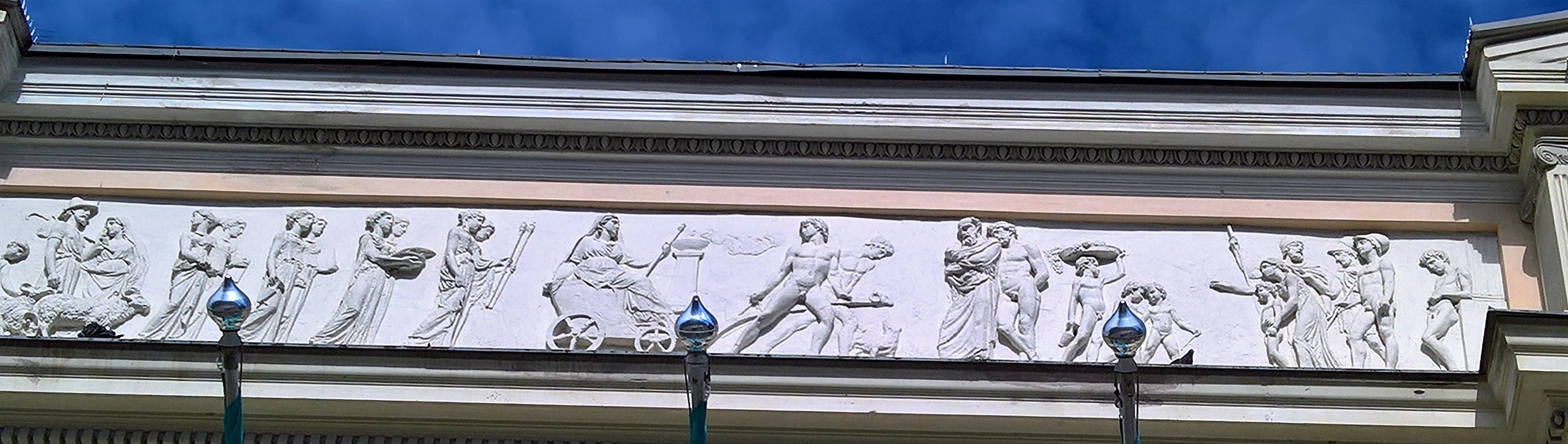
Kleobis and Biton on the facade of the Old Student House, Helsinki, 1878

== See also ==
- Art in Finland
- Golden Age of Finnish Art
