= Grahn =

Grahn is a Swedish surname. It is an ornamental spelling of the Swedish word Gran, meaning “Norway Spruce”. It can be found less commonly in Germany, and worldwide primarily in Swedish diaspora. Notable people with the surname include:

- Anders Grahn (born 1979), Swedish songwriter, multi instrumentalist, vocal coach and producer
- Anders Grahn (curler) (born 1958), Swedish curler
- Arne Grahn (1902–1989), Finnish tennis player
- Anton Grahn (born 2004), Swedish cross-country skier
- Bengt-Erik Grahn (1941–2019), Swedish alpine skier
- Bo Grahn (1947–2018), Finnish shot putter
- Carl Grahn (born 1981), Finnish ice hockey player
- Christian Grahn (born 1978), Swedish drummer
- Dieter Grahn
- Elna Jane Hilliard Grahn
- Henry Grahn Hermunen (born 1963), Finnish contemporary artist
- Judy Grahn
- Karl Gustaf Grahn (1868–1907), Finnish architect who co-founded Grahn, Hedman & Wasastjerna
- Lucile Grahn
- Matilda Grahn
- Nancy Lee Grahn
- Ove Grahn
- Sanni Grahn-Laasonen (née Grahn; born 1983), Finnish politician
- Sara Grahn
- Sören Grahn (born 1962), Swedish curler and coach
- Sture Grahn
- Tobias Grahn
- Ulf Grahn
- Wallis Grahn
