= Eva Anttila =

Finnish painter and textile artist (1894–1993)

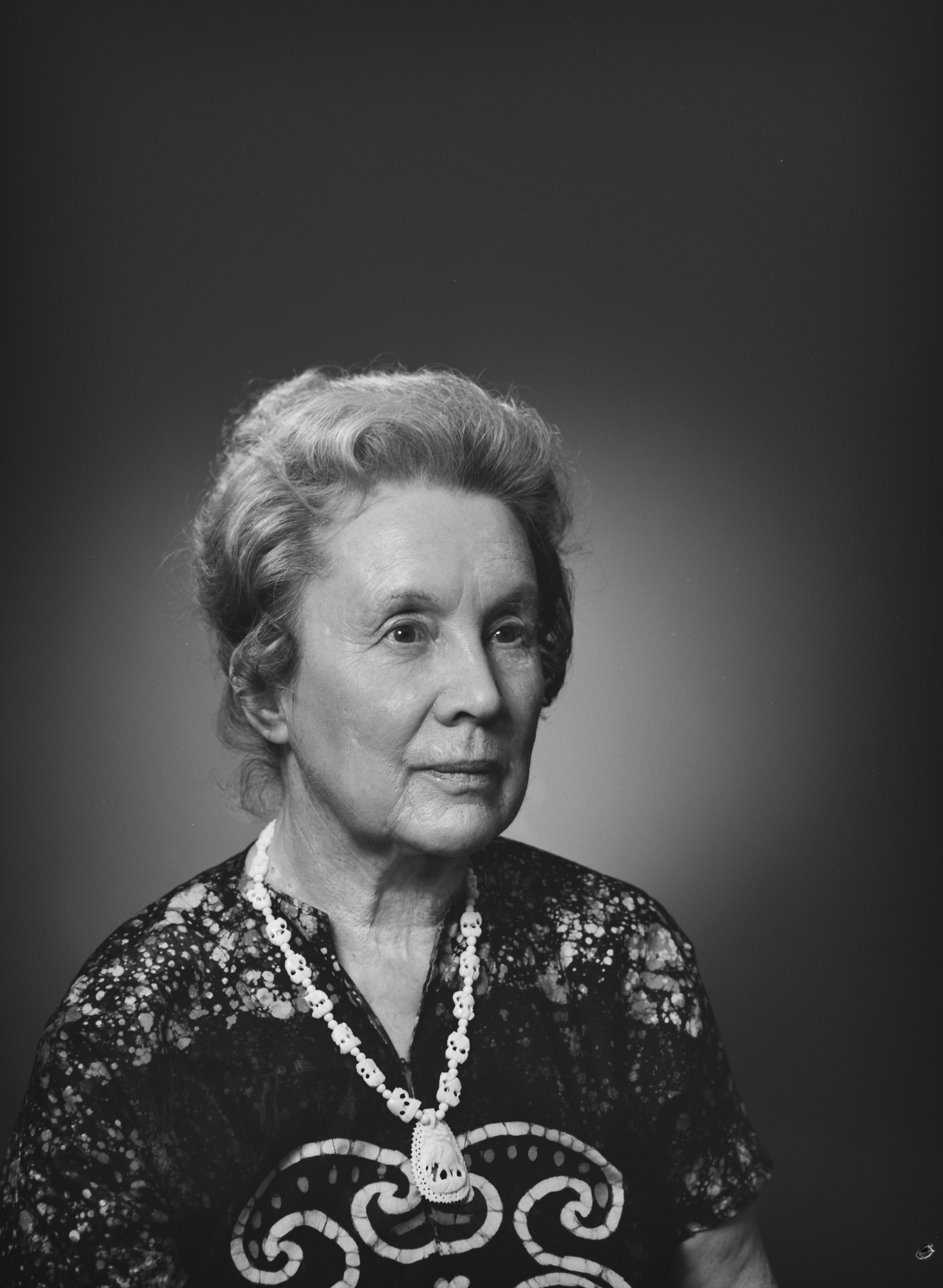
Anttila, 1972

Eva Anttila (March 30, 1894, Tampere – August 1, 1993 Espoo) was a Finnish painter and textile artist. Her work was notable for applying techniques of painting to her textile works and creating pictorial scenes.

== Biography ==
Anttila was born on March 30, 1894, in Tampere, Finland to Selma Anttila (née Helander), a writer, and Werner Anttila, a translator and publisher. Her brother, Leo Anttila (1903-1967) was a writer. She attended the school of the Finnish Art Society from 1913 to 1915 where she studied painting. She later graduated from the Design Department of the School of Art and Design in 1917. Anttila was married to Finnish painter Alexander Paischeff from 1917 to 1918 and Finnish artist Arttu Brummer from 1921 to 1923. She had two children, daughter Eila Pajastie, born in 1918, and son Paavo Anttila, born in 1929. Anttila was one of the first teachers of textile art in Finland, and later taught in Iceland, England, and the United States.

== Art ==
Anttila was a recognized painter in Finland in the 1910s, before later shifting to textile work. In the 1924 she started a private weaving studio where she began creating textiles for interiors, placing an emphasis on practicality.

After World War II, Anttila solely focused on designing tapestries. Her work with tapestries places an emphasis on texture and color, dyeing her own yarn and borrowing shading techniques from painting. She would begin her work with a rough sketch, deciding color and details as she went along.

The Bank of Finland commissioned Anttila to create a tapestry in 1952. She designed Work and Life, a nearly five meter long tapestry that depicted the shift from an agrarian society into a society focused on education and technological advancement that took place in post-war Finland.

In 1983 Anttila was awarded Textile Artist of the Year by TEXO, the Finnish Association for Textile Artists and Designers. Over 70 of her tapestries were displayed in this exhibition.

== Notable works ==
- Evening, 1949
- White Veil, 1950
- Profiles, 1952
- Finnish Forest, 1952
- Work and Life, 1952
