= Sigrid Lehrbäck =

Finnish painter

Sigrid Emilia Lehrbäck (26 October 1876 in Oulu – 20 June 1923 in Oulu) was a Finnish painter.

Lehrbäck's parents were cargo surveyor Anders Lehrbäck and Margareta Suutari. She studied at the Academy of Fine Arts, Helsinki from 1898 to 1899 and at the Aalto University School of Arts, Design and Architecture and abroad in Paris. She participated in the exhibitions of Finnish Artists in 1899, 1900, 1903, 1904, 1905, 1906 and 1907. In the late 1890s, Lehrbäck assisted the painter Albert Edelfelt and assisted in 1897 the portrait of the Governor General, Count P. Suvalov, in 1898 the portrait of Nicholas II and later View of Haiko, painted for the 1900 World's Fair in Paris in 1899, in a painting by Edelfelt.

Lehrbäck was a teacher at the Central School of Art and Design from 1900 to 1918 but had to resign due to illness. She had been married to Gustav Valdemar Lehtinen since 1914.
