= Per Brahe statue =

Bronze statue in Turku, Finland

Pietari Brahen patsas Per Brahes staty
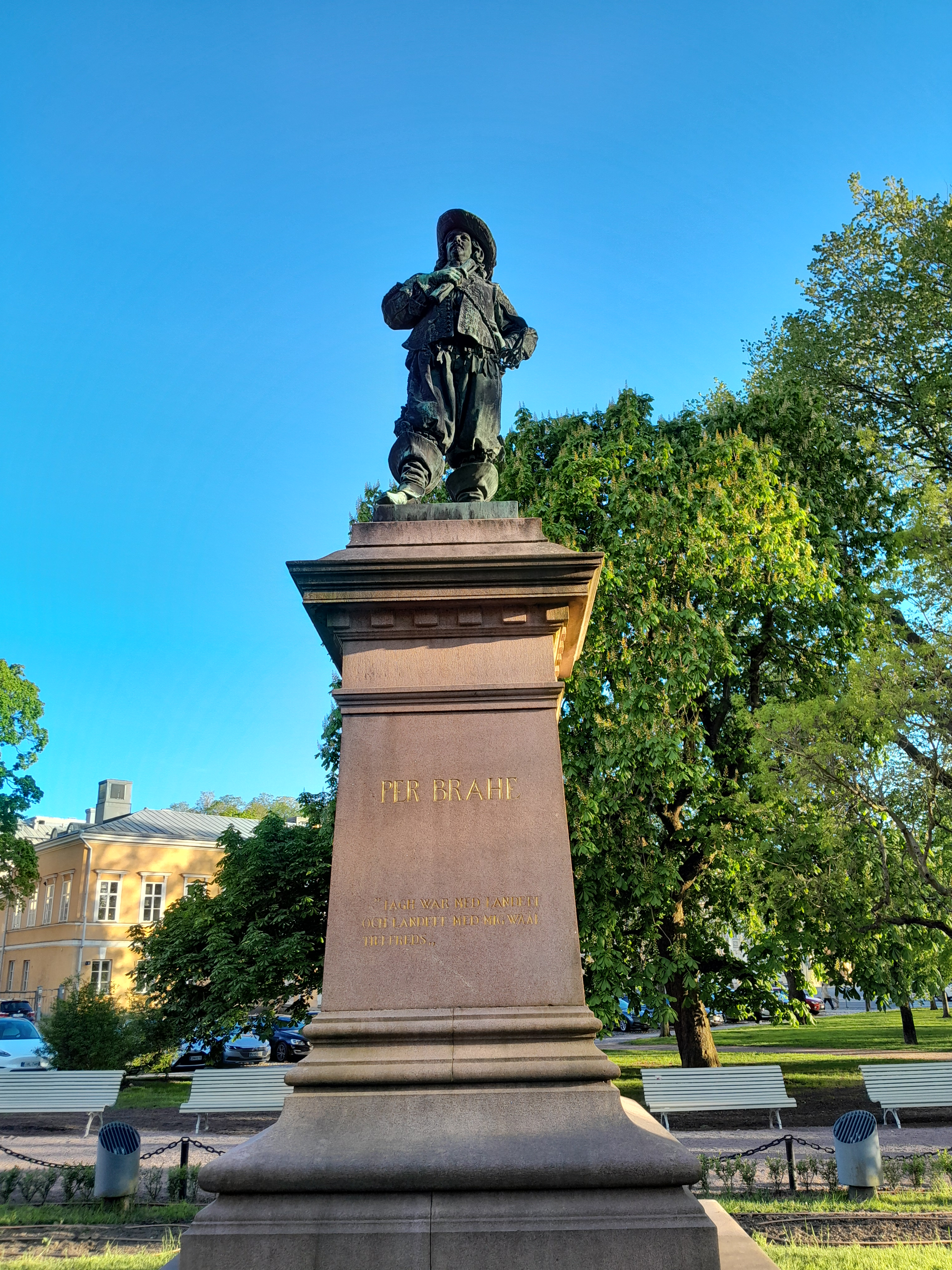
- Artist: Walter Runeberg
- Year: 1888; 138 years ago
- Type: Bronze
- Location: Turku, Finland; 60°27′06″N 22°16′40″E

The Per Brahe statue (Finnish: Pietari Brahen patsas, Swedish: Per Brahes staty) is a monument of Per Brahe the Younger, the Governor-General of Finland and first chancellor of the Academy of Turku, located in Brahenpuisto in Turku, Finland. It was designed by Walter Runeberg and unveiled in 1888.

The statue is made of bronze and stands 2.95 metres (9 ft 8 in) high. The base is made of red granite, standing 4 metres (13 ft) high. The base has the Swedish text Iagh war med landett och landett med mig wääl tillfreds ("I was satisfied with my country and my country satisfied with me").

Runeberg had previously made a statue for the base in Brahenpuisto, but the base was too small; so this earlier statue was sold to Raahe, where it was placed in the Pekkatori square in the city centre. Runeberg sculpted the one seen in Turku later the same year.

Other statues of Brahe are located in Raahe (slightly larger copy of the work by Walter Runeberg also from 1888), Lieksa (1953), and Kajaani (1954) in Finland; in Gränna (1916), Sweden.

== Gallery ==
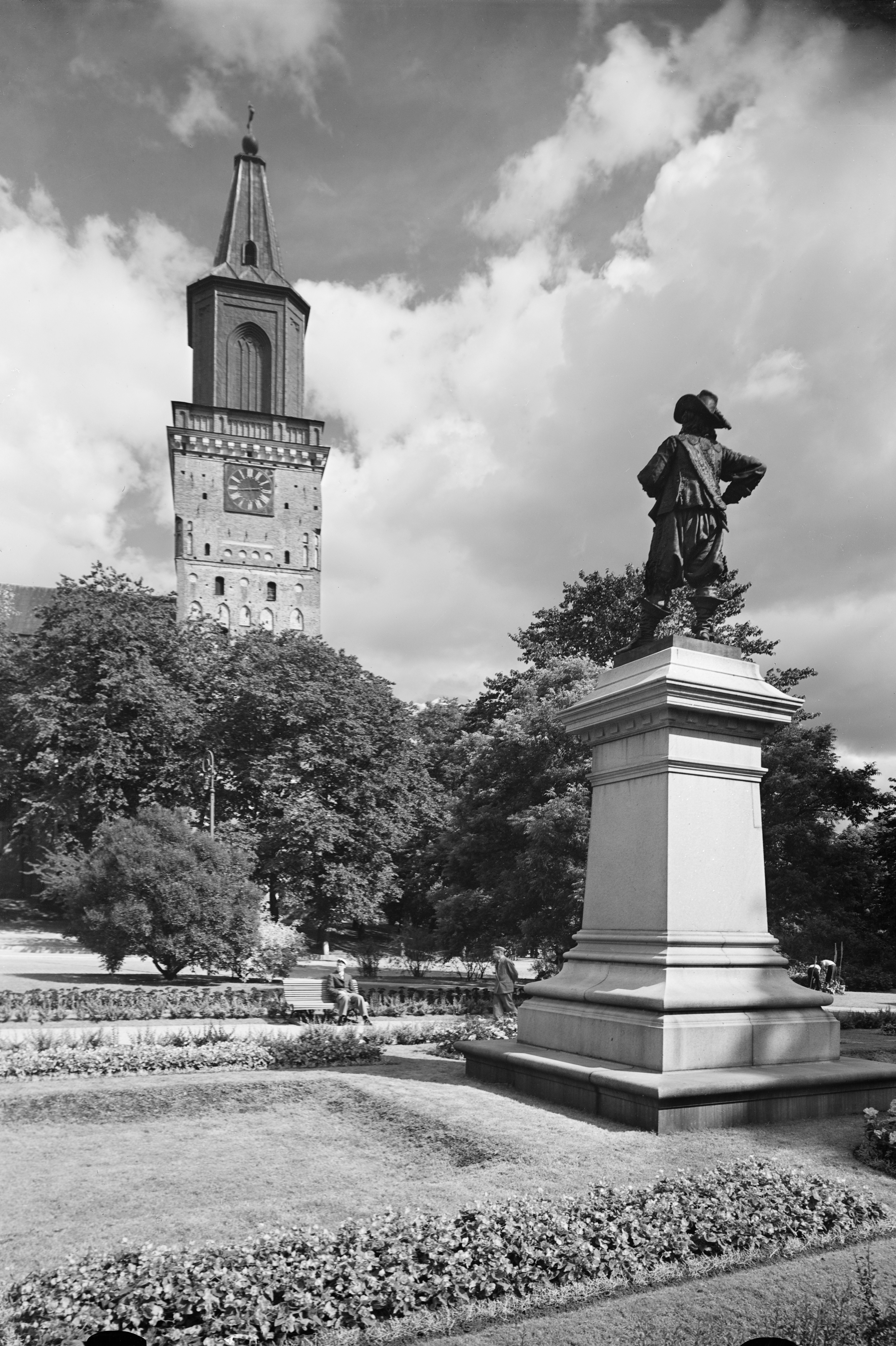
The statue faces the Turku Cathedral.

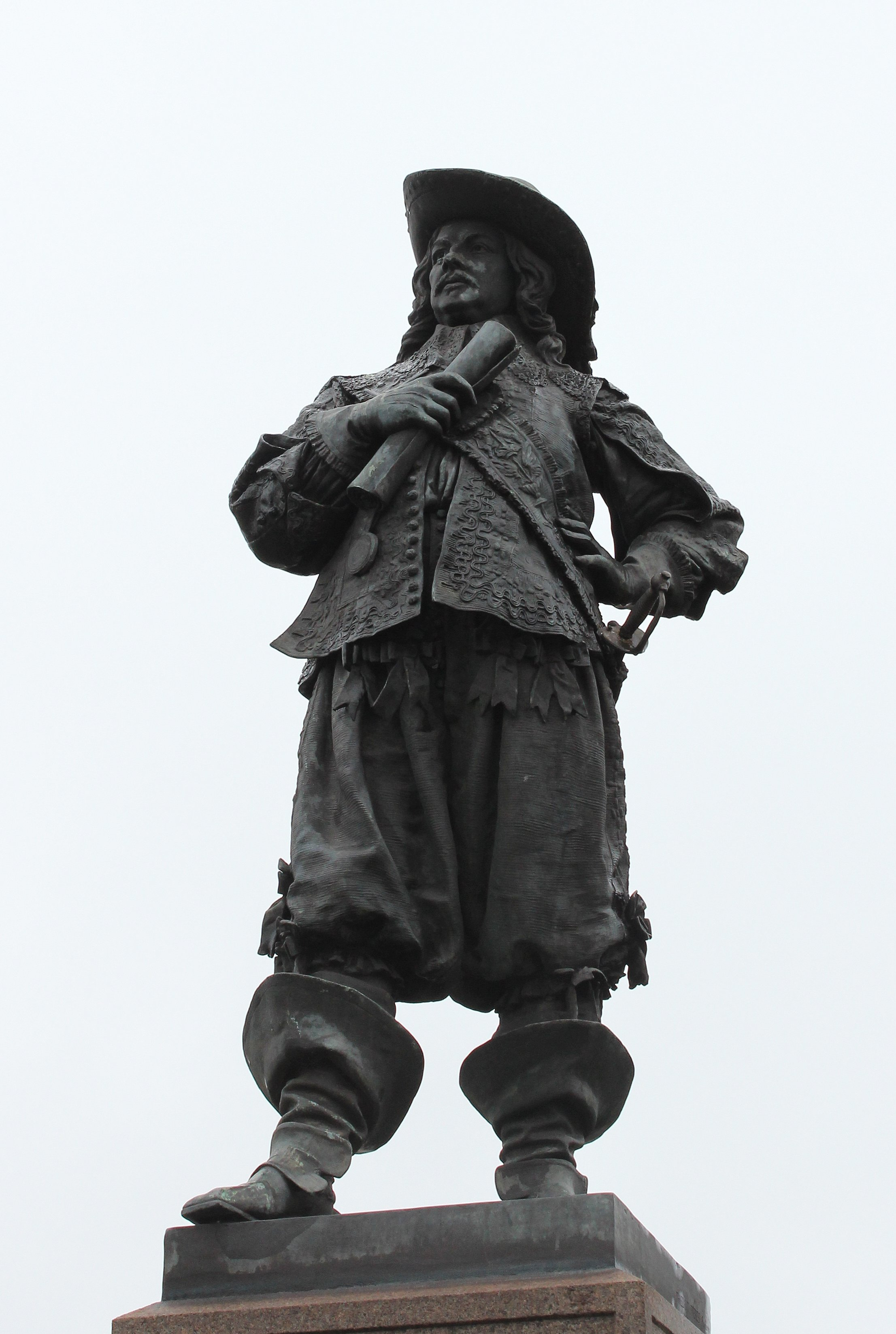
Slightly larger version of the same Per Brahe statue in Raahe
