= Ebba Masalin =

Finnish painter (1873-1942)

- Born: 29 August 1873; Mikkeli, Finland
- Died: 31 March 1942 (aged 68)
- Known for: paintings and illustrations

Ebba Masalin (29 August 1873 – 31 March 1942) was a Finnish painter, draftsman and illustrator.

Masalin's parents were Gabriel Johan and Emilia Masalin. She was born in the town of Mikkeli. Both her parents' families had been civil servants for several generations and her father became Governor of Oulu Province. She did not marry and lived with her sister for much of her life.

Masalin studied at the Art Society of Finland's Drawing School in Helsinki between 1892 and 1898. Her work was included in national exhibitions by Finnish artists between 1898 and 1905.

She worked as a teacher and illustrator. Her best-known paintings were for schools, depicting wild and garden plants and sometimes animals. These paintings show the plants on a black background, as in a school blackboard, and were designed by John Lindén, the husband of her cousin. They were published by the Otava company. It is likely that her sister Hedvig made the engravings needed for printing these illustrations. This type of wall illustration was widely used in schools in Finland from the late 19th to the mid-20th century and was an important educational tool.

Masalin also painted portraits and landscapes.
