= Rikard Larsson-Eng =

Swedish writer

Rikard Larsson-Eng (born Larsson, 1969) is a Swedish internationally active writer and poet.

In his writings, Larsson-Eng often delves in various metaphysical and philosophical ideas and notions. A recurring theme is the concept of 'will' and its implications on the contemporary human being – in particular, regarding the individual subject's (dis)ability to exercise its freedom of will in relation to morality and ethics. This is specifically true considering the notion of time, which in Larsson-Eng's works often exists in a circular manner, making actions and events repeatable, and thus possible to re-investigate and explore from different moral and ethical angles. An example of this is the novel In i labyrinten, dragga i kanalerna [The Idiots] from 2005 which stirred some controversy due to its use of absurdity, and profane language combined with philosophical and existential reflections.

During the 2020s, Larsson-Eng entered a collaboration with the Finnish/Swedish artist Henry Grahn Hermunen. They have developed an art form that draws on their different backgrounds, and let circles, squares and other figures blend together with words and meanings – originating from a variety of languages such as worldwide English, Nahuatl, Latin, Japanese, Braille among others – in intrinsic patterns, creating subtexts and unexpected allusions that refer to existential and philosophical matters. In 2023 they participated in the Tokyo Biennale with the piece "Perspective Lyrique Japonaise", which stands out as an example of this aesthetics. Larsson-Eng has exhibited at various art venues such as Bienal POSVERSO in Buenos Aires, Schriftmuseum Bartlhaus in Pettenbach, Austria, HOK Gallery in The Hague, Netherlands, and the New York Boyer Foundation, among others.

In addition, Larsson-Eng has a career in the field of cultural heritage for theatre, dance and music. He has been the editor of the journal Dokumenterat since 2013. From 2014 to 2023, he was chairman of the Nordic theatre network NCTD.
