= Sini Manninen =

Finnish painter and artist (1944-2012)

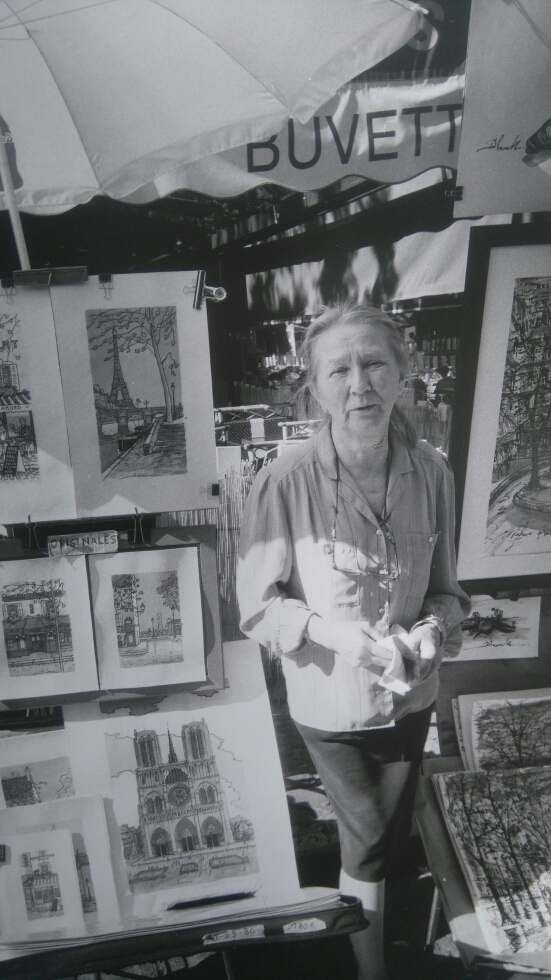
- Sini Manninen at the Place du Tertre in Montmartre in 2012
- Born: August 26, 1944; Joensuu, Finland
- Died: September 23, 2012 (aged 68); Paris, France
- Education: Academy of Fine Arts, Helsinki
- Style: Naïve art

Sini Manninen (26 August 1944, Joensuu, Finland – 23 September 2012, Paris, France) was a Finnish painter and artist, trained at the Académie des Beaux Arts de Helsinki in Finland. She produced the majority of her works in France, to which she moved in 1973, more precisely, to the Montmartre district of Paris. Mastering many painting techniques (oil, acrylic, watercolors, ink, and charcoal) under various disciplines, naïve art remained her fondest style.

== Biography ==
=== Family and childhood ===
A youngest daughter of Elis Olavi Carolus Manninen and Elisabeth Budnik, Sini Manninen grew up in Joensuu, Karelia, where her father officiated as a pastor before becoming a member of Parliament during the 1960s. Later, the family moved several kilometers to the small town of Liperi, where nature and its colors, as well as animals, became an inexhaustible source of artistic inspiration.

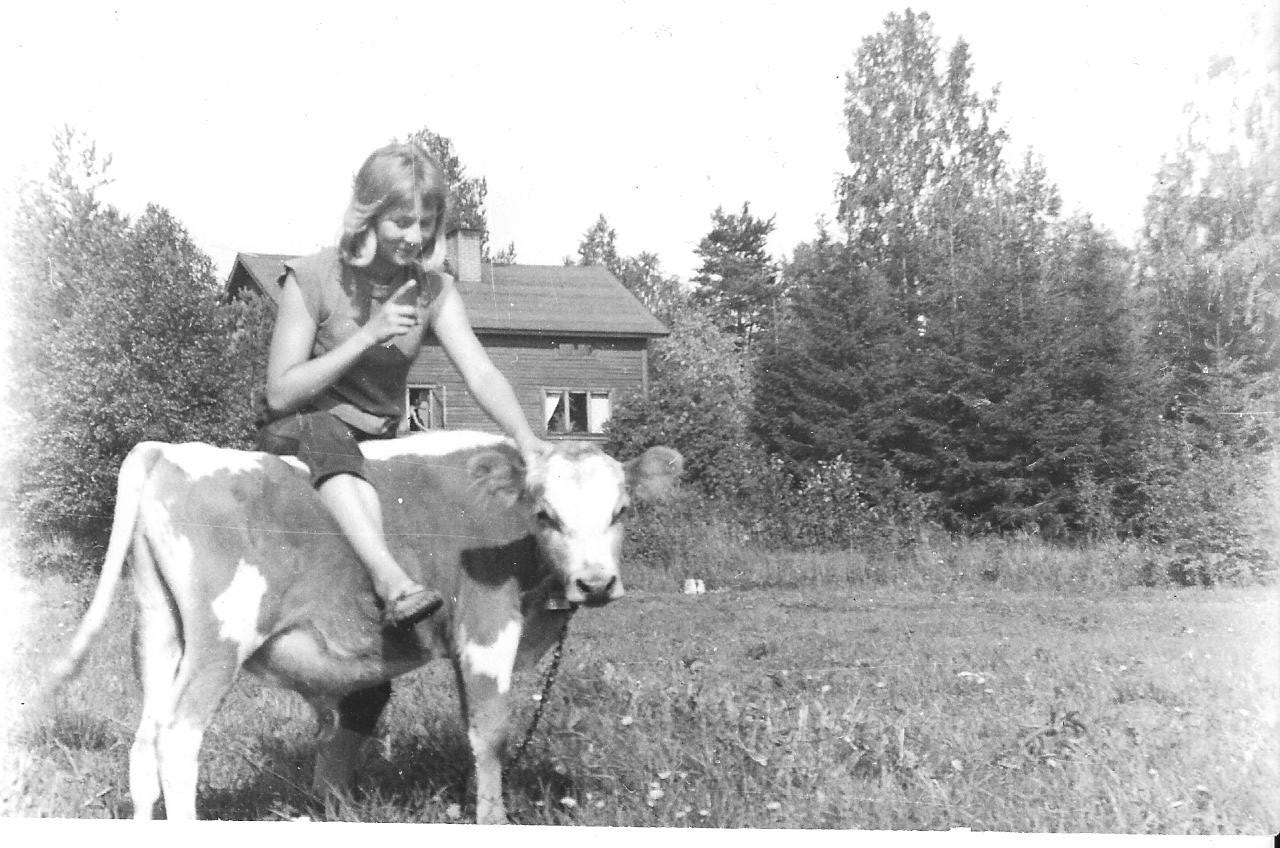
Sini Manninen in 1978, with a calf in front of the family home in Liperi

In 1965, she moved to Helsinki to enter the Academy of Fine Arts (Suomen taideakatemia) until 1969. During this time, she trained with other renowned artists such as Saara Tikka, Inari Krohn, Tarja Unkari, Kari Lindström and Risto Vilhunen. Between 1970 and 1973, she went to work in a herring plant in Norway to earn a living and participated in the Oslo Young Painter's Association in Norway from 1970 to 1977.

=== Parisian life ===
In 1973, she moved to Montmartre, in Paris, to live with her companion Jacques Blank, also a painter, whom she met in Norway. While living in Paris, she showcased numerous exhibitions, as well as elsewhere in the world. Sini and Jacques’ everyday life took place at the Place du Tertre in Montmartre where they painted and sold their artwork. In 1980, Sini Manninen received a grant from the Finnish Foundation to attend the Cité internationale des arts in Paris. That same year their first child was born, Solene, while their second child, Mikko was born shortly thereafter in 1982. Following the death of Jacques' father, Lucien Blank, in 1988, the family decided to seek a life conducive to the development of their children and their art.

=== Provincial life ===
In 1990, the family moved to Confolens, a small town in the northeast Charente region, where they settled permanently. Nonetheless, in order to make a living, the two artists were forced to keep their small apartment in Montmartre, where they went regularly to continue painting on the Place du Tertre. Sini Manninen actively painted for public and private exhibitions. Additionally, some works have been exhibited at the museum of naïve art in Vicq, in Ile de France, as well as at the Art Museum of Matanzas in Cuba.

== Expositions ==
1973–1977

- Gallery II, Stavanger, Norway

- Salon international « Paris Sud »

- Salon d'Automne Paris, France

- Cannes International, France

- XXVe Grand Prix International de Peinture de Deauville, Deauville, France

- Salon International des Beaux Arts, Paris, France

- Salon des Indépendants, Paris

- Art Center, Västeräs, Sweden

1978

- Salon d'automne, Paris, France

- Exhibition à la Mairie du IVe arrondissement de Paris, France

- Grand Prix International de Peinture de Deauville, Deauville, France

- Young Painters Exhibition

- Jeune Expression, Paris

- Solo Exhibition « Docent Duk » Stockholm, Sweden

1979

- Salon des Indépendants, Paris, France

- Salon des Artistes Français, Paris

- Exhibition Jeune Peinture

- Jeune Expression, Paris

- Solo Exhibition à Västeräs et Stockholm, Sweden

1980

- Exposition à la Mairie du XVIIIe arrondissement de Paris, France

- Salon des Indépendants, Paris, France

- Exposition Jeune Peinture

- Jeune Expression, Paris

- Solo Exhibition à Västeräs, Sweden

1981

- Exposition à la Mairie du XVIIIe arrondissement de Paris, France

- Exposition à l'Atelier 74, Paris

- Exposition à la Mairie du XIIIe arrondissement de Paris, France

- Exposition à la Cité Internationale des Arts de Paris, France

- Solo Exhibition, Helsinki, Finland

1982

- Exposition à la Mairie du XVIIe arrondissement de Paris, France

- Salon des Artistes Français, Paris

- Solo Exhibition, Ibi, Spain

1985

- Exhibition Gallery Lawrence Ross, Los Angeles, USA

1986

- Exhibition at Musée d'art Naïf Max Fourny, Paris Montmartre

1988

- Exhibition at the Cité internationale des Arts, à Paris

- XVIIe « Salon », Rueil-Malmaison, Paris

1989

- XVIIIe « Salon », Rueil-Malmaison, Paris, salle Pleyel, Public Show, Paris

1990

- Salon International d'Art Naïf, Marie du IVe arrondissement, Paris

1991

- Exposition des donateurs, Musée de la ville de Matanzas, Cuba

1992

- International Show of Naive Painter Art, Paris

- Private painting Show, Galerie Cheize d'Or, Poitiers

1993

- Exhibition « 3 en 1 », mairie de Confolens, Charente, France

- European Naifs, Holdsworth Galleries, Australia

- IIIe Exposition Internationale de Pontivy, France

1994

- International Show of Naive Painter Art, Paris

- Solo Exhibition, Galerie Cheize d'Or, Poitiers

1995

- Ve Exposition Internationale de Pontivy, France

- Solo Exhibition, Galerie Bröms, Helsinki Finland

1996

- Solo Exhibition, Galerie Cheize d'Or, Poitiers

1997

- Solo Exhibition, Alicante, Spain

- Study Benaiton, Angoulême, France

1998

- Solo Exhibition, Pyysaari, Helsinki, Finland

1999

- Group Exhibition, CNBDI, Angoulême, France

- Solo Exhibition, Alicante, Spain

- Solo Exhibition, Confolens, Charente, France

1999–2002

- Exhibition Gallery Broms, Liperi, Finland

2002

- Group Exhibition d'Art Naïf, Saint Junien, France

2003

- Solo Exhibition, Pyysaari, Helsinki, Finland

2005

- Solo Exhibition, Galerie Broms, Helsinki, Finland 2006

- Festival d'Art Naïf, Saint Junien

- Group Exhibition of Art Naif de Montivilliers, France

- Festival d'Art Naif, Verneuil sur Avre

2011

- Group Exhibition,"La Balade des Naïfs", The Connoisseur's Gallery, Paris VIe arrt

2012

- Group Exhibition, Association Art Montmartre, salle paroissiale de l'église Saint Pierre de Montmartre

2013

- Solo Exhibition, Pyysaari, Helsinki, Finland

2017

- Solo Exhibition, galerie de la Fontorse et Mairie de Confolens
