= Henry Grahn Hermunen =

Finnish artist

Henry Grahn Hermunen (born 1963, Helsinki) is a contemporary artist who lives in Stockholm, Sweden, and Helsinki, Finland.

== Biography ==
Hermunen studied at the Academy of Fine Arts, Helsinki, Finland, between 1996 and 2001 and received a Master of Fine Arts. From 1998 to 2000, he was a scholar at The Royal Institute of Art, Royal University College of Fine Arts in Stockholm, Sweden.

Since the late 1990s, he has created large-scale installations using techniques including photography, drawing, sculpture, painting, light, and sound. Taking a poetic approach to environmental ecology, he has undertaken sociopolitical projects nationally and internationally.

In a text directed to researchers, Hermunen stated: "The freedom when creating art, gives chances and excellent possibilities for broader study and discoveries also in sciences such as philosophy, mathematics and physics."

In an interview with Ny Tid (Finland) news magazine titled "Art about the beauty in Life," Henry Grahn Hermunen said: "We live in the middle of a worldwide renaissance with global education through the internet. But for example, people work too much to have time to consume what they have. Medias role is crucial - they can obviously make people shrink. Joseph Pulitzer, who founded the Pulitzer Prize and who sometimes acted dubiously himself, said a hundred years ago 'that a cynical, mercenary and demagogic press will eventually create a people who are just as shabby as themselves'".

Henry Grahn Hermunen has exhibited at art venues including Art Forum Berlin, ARCO Madrid, and the Whitechapel Gallery in London, as well as holding solo exhibitions at Marina Gisich Gallery and the Hermitage Museum in St. Petersburg. Swedish newspaper Svenska Dagbladet wrote that Grahn Hermunen is the first North European contemporary artist invited to exhibit "Water table in a renaissance garden" in one of the halls of the Hermitage, a museum considered to be one of the world's foremost Institutions.

While visiting the exhibition, Marina Chekmareva of the State Hermitage Museum said in an interview with Alexey Sukhorukov of Russia-Culture National TV, "We have been carrying out these combined exhibition - masterclass projects for three years by the most advanced artists not only from Russia but also from abroad."

During the exhibition Right Here Right Now at the Helsinki City Art Museum Gallery–Kluuvi, the Finnish artist Erkka N. observed: "It is like entering right into a big abstract painting". Grahn Hermunen reflected: “Of course, this may be satisfactory enough, the unknown, beautifully abstract, but there was and still is a binary, minimalistic precise, and limitless mathematical language there, which I have developed over many years”.

At the Tokyo Biennale in 2023, Henry Grahn Hermunen exhibited Diptyque: Perspective Lyrique Japonaise with the Swedish poet and author Rikard Larsson-Eng and revealed some details about his research and artwork:

“In the early 1990s, Grahn Hermunen evaluated how to explain complex connected structures in the most primary minimalistic way, relating only two symbols, the circle and square. Add movement and spin to these symbols in any directions and they become/are equivalent; at the same time, they are opposite, representing (+) and (-), male and female, body and soul, etc. This binary system might be extended to become a sphere and a cube for example, and further achievable connected dimensions, everything also in movement. An allegory for a possible extensive ‘language’, and ‘mindset’ with no limits.”

After years of research, Grahn Hermunen identified similarities between his work and that of the mathematician, philosopher, and scientist Gottfried von Leibniz, as well as similarities with Islamic geometric patterns.

Practically and metaphorically, these fundamental binary code components are used in computers as 0 and 1.

His research through art expanded into many fields: shape of the universe, universes, spacetime, particles, life, death, afterlife, consciousness, entanglement, action at a distance, energy, social structures, ecology, politics, and extrasensory perception (ESP). Some pieces also have a consciously intuitive aspect that is related to the deep knowledge possessed within us, as can be seen in the piece “It is there…in and all around us”.

Works by Grahn Hermunen are held in the collections of Moderna Museet, the Museum of Modern Art in Stockholm, Sweden; Pro Artibus in Finland; Hamburger Bahnhof, Museum of Contemporary Art, in Berlin, Germany; the Museum of Modern Art in New York City; Erarta Museum of Contemporary Art in St. Petersburg, Russia; and the South Karelian Art Museum in Finland.

In 2011, Henry Grahn Hermunen was invited by head curator Larisa Skobkina Golybeva to participate in the 10th International Dialogues Biennale in Manege, the Main Exhibition Hall in St. Petersburg, Russia, and to curate its Northern European section.

The artist is represented by Cath Alexandrine Danneskiold-Samsøe Gallery in Denmark, Marina Gisich Gallery in Russia, and Karin Weber-Galerie Mitte in Germany.
