= Academy of Fine Arts, Helsinki =

Fine arts school of the University of the Arts Helsinki

Coordinates: 60°11′48″N 24°56′52″E

The Academy of Fine Arts (Finnish: Kuvataideakatemia; Swedish: Bildkonstakademin) in Helsinki, Finland is part of the University of the Arts Helsinki and provides the highest university-level theoretical and practical training in the country in fine arts.

The Academy of Fine Arts building in Sörnäinen.

== Academy ==
The Academy was founded in 1848 by a private foundation called The Art Society of Finland (or Finnish Art Society, or Finnish Art Association) (fi: Suomen Taideyhdistys). At that time the academy was called a Drawing School.

In 1939 it became The Finnish Art Academy School (fi: Suomen Taideakatemian koulu).

In 1985 it became The Academy of Fine Arts. In the beginning of 1993 the status of the Academy was raised to university level. 3.5 years of full-time study leads to the degree of Bachelor of Fine Arts, and completing the Master's degree takes two further years.

In the academic year 2012-2013 the number of students was about 280.

The Academy of Fine Arts is located at Sörnäisten rantatie 19 in the neighbourhood of Sörnäinen.

== Former Students ==
- Elin Danielson-Gambogi, painter
- Hilda Flodin, painter, sculptor
- Henry Grahn Hermunen, contemporary artist
- Sini Manninen, painter
- Ebba Masalin, painter, 1892 - 1898
- Eva Ryynänen (1915—2001), sculptor
- Eliel Saarinen, architect, member in 1920
- Tove Jansson, artist, illustrator, and creator of the Moomins
- Heljä Liukko-Sundström, ceramic artist (1938–2024)
- Jerry W Carter, contemporary artist
- Majlis (Maj-Lis) Ingegerd Skaltje Sami film director

== See also ==
- Ateneum
