= March of the Björneborg Regiment =

Painting by Albert Edelfeld

The March of the Björneborg Regiment
- Björneborgarnas marsch (Swedish), Porilaisten marssi (Finnish)
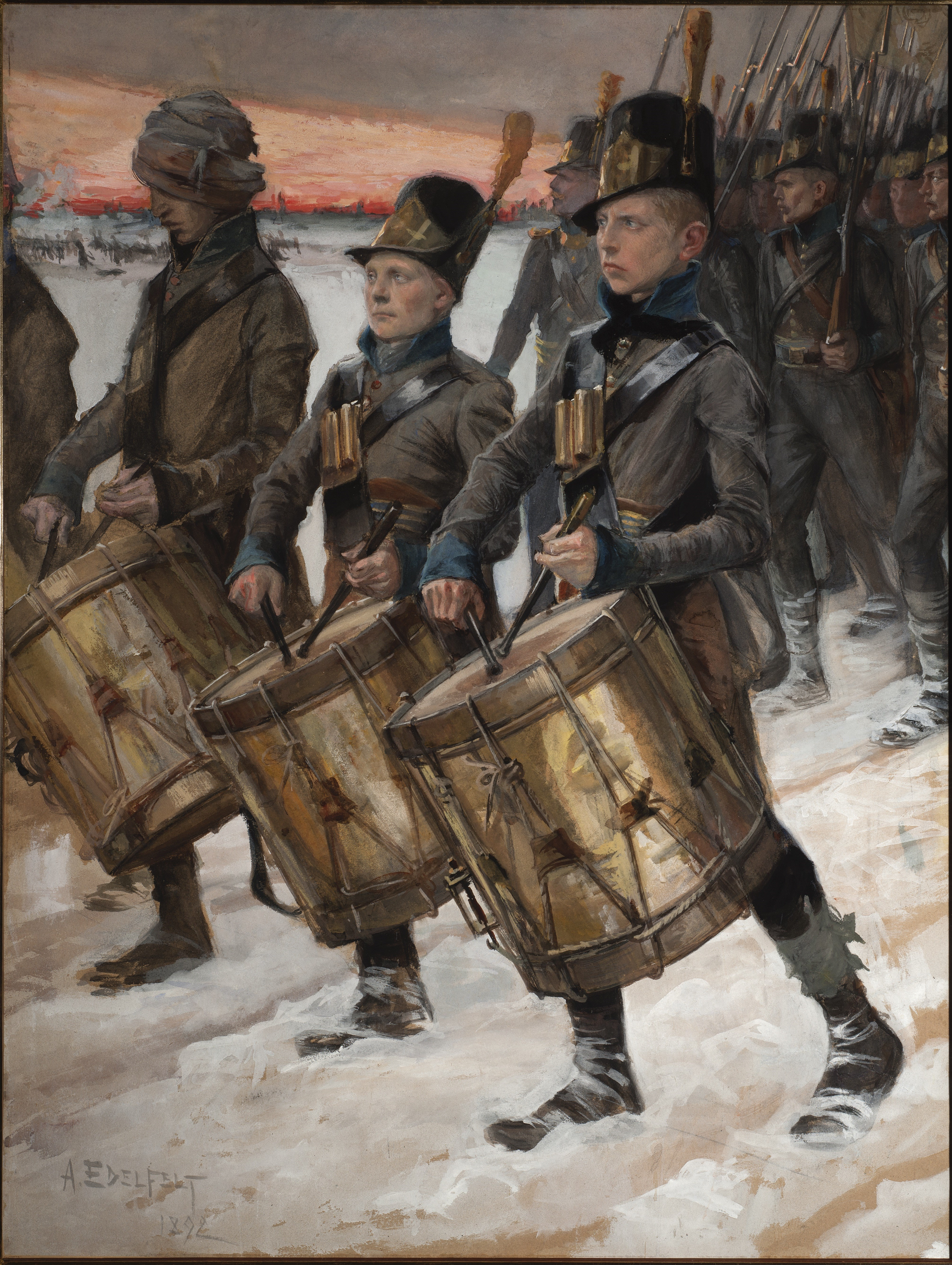
- Artist: Albert Edelfelt
- Year: 1897–1900
- Medium: gouache
- Dimensions: 54 cm × 41 cm (21 in × 16 in)
- Location: Ateneum, Helsinki, Finland
- Owner: Museovirasto
- Website: www.kansallisgalleria.fi/en/object/388595

The March of the Björneborg Regiment (also Finnish Soldiers in the War of 1808 – 1809) is a gouache painting by Finnish painter Albert Edelfelt completed in 1892.

The painting depicts marching Finnish soldiers in a wintry landscape during the Finnish War fought between the Kingdom of Sweden and the Russian Empire from 1808 to 1809. As a result of the war, Finland was separated from the Swedish kingdom and annexed as an autonomous grand duchy of the Russian Empire.

The painting depicts the marching drummer boys of the Pori Brigade, historically known as Björneborgs läns infanteriregemente. The subject of the painting is the poem of the same name included in the second part of J. L. Runeberg's The Tales of Ensign Stål, which was inspired by a piece of music known as Björneborgarnas marsch. Jean Sibelius composed a version of Björneborgarnas marsch for the unveiling of the painting in 1892, but this version was lost.

There are two versions of the painting. The original one from 1892 is owned by the Gösta Serlachius Fine Arts Foundation and found at the Serlachius Museum Gösta in Mänttä, Finland – it was bought in 1928 by Gösta Serlachius from Ida Aspelin-Haapkylä. The second version hangs at the Ateneum in Helsinki, Finland.
