= Albert Edelfelt =

Finnish painter (1854–1905)

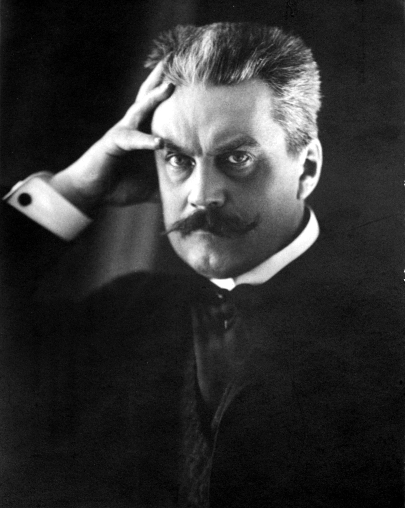
- Edelfelt in 1905
- Born: Albert Gustaf Aristides Edelfelt; 21 July 1854; Porvoo, Grand Duchy of Finland, Russian Empire
- Died: 18 August 1905 (aged 51); Porvoo, Grand Duchy of Finland, Russian Empire
- Education: Finnish Art Society; Royal Academy of Fine Arts; École Nationale des Beaux-Arts
- Known for: Painting
- Notable work: Luxembourg Gardens, Paris; Portrait of Louis Pasteur
- Movement: Realism
- Spouse: Baroness Ellan de la Chapelle (m. 1888)
- Children: 1

Albert Gustaf Aristides Edelfelt (21 July 1854 – 18 August 1905) was a Finnish painter noted for his naturalistic style and Realist approach to art. He lived in the Grand Duchy of Finland and made Finnish culture visible abroad, before Finland gained independence. He was considered the greatest Finnish artist of the second half of 19th and the first half of the 20th centuries, and one of the most prominent contributors to the Golden Age of Finnish Art.

== Early life and education ==
Edelfelt was born 1854 in Porvoo, son of the Swedish architect Carl Albert Edelfelt (1818–1869), who had lived in Finland since his early youth, and Alexandra Edelfeldt (née Brandt 1833–1901). His father died when he was still young, and his mother had to raise him and his younger siblings alone compounded by financial difficulties. He remained very close to his mother throughout his life.

He began his formal studies of art in 1869 at the Drawing School of the Finnish Art Society in Helsinki and continued as a student of Adolf von Becker (1871–73). He then received a scholarship from the Finnish government to study history painting at the Royal Academy of Fine Arts in Antwerp, Belgium. He studied under Nicaise de Keyser for several months in 1873–74, and won an award for excellence for his painting of Alexander the Great on his deathbed. He also began a long-lasting friendship with the Belgian artist Émile Claus.

== Career ==
=== Arrival in Paris – History Painting ===
In the autumn of 1874, at the age of nineteen, following the advice of his teacher Adolf von Becker, he moved to Paris and enrolled at the Ecole des Beaux-Arts. He shared a small studio with a Finnish friend at 24 Rue Bonaparte. Under the instruction of the French painter Jean-Léon Gerome, he continued to focus on history painting, particularly scenes of the long series of wars involving the Russians, Swedes, and Finns.

After a year in Paris, he returned to Helsinki, but came back to Paris in 1876, taking a studio at 81 boulevard du Montparnasse. He became friends with the painter Jules Bastien-Lepage, who introduced him to the techniques of painting in the open air. His major work of this time was Duke Charles IX of Sweden insulting the corpse of his enemy Klaus Fleming (1878). This work, which blended the formal academic style with elements of careful realism, such as the dust on the boots. This painting did not cause a stir in Paris, but it enjoyed a great success in Finland; it was purchased by the Finnish Society of Fine Arts.

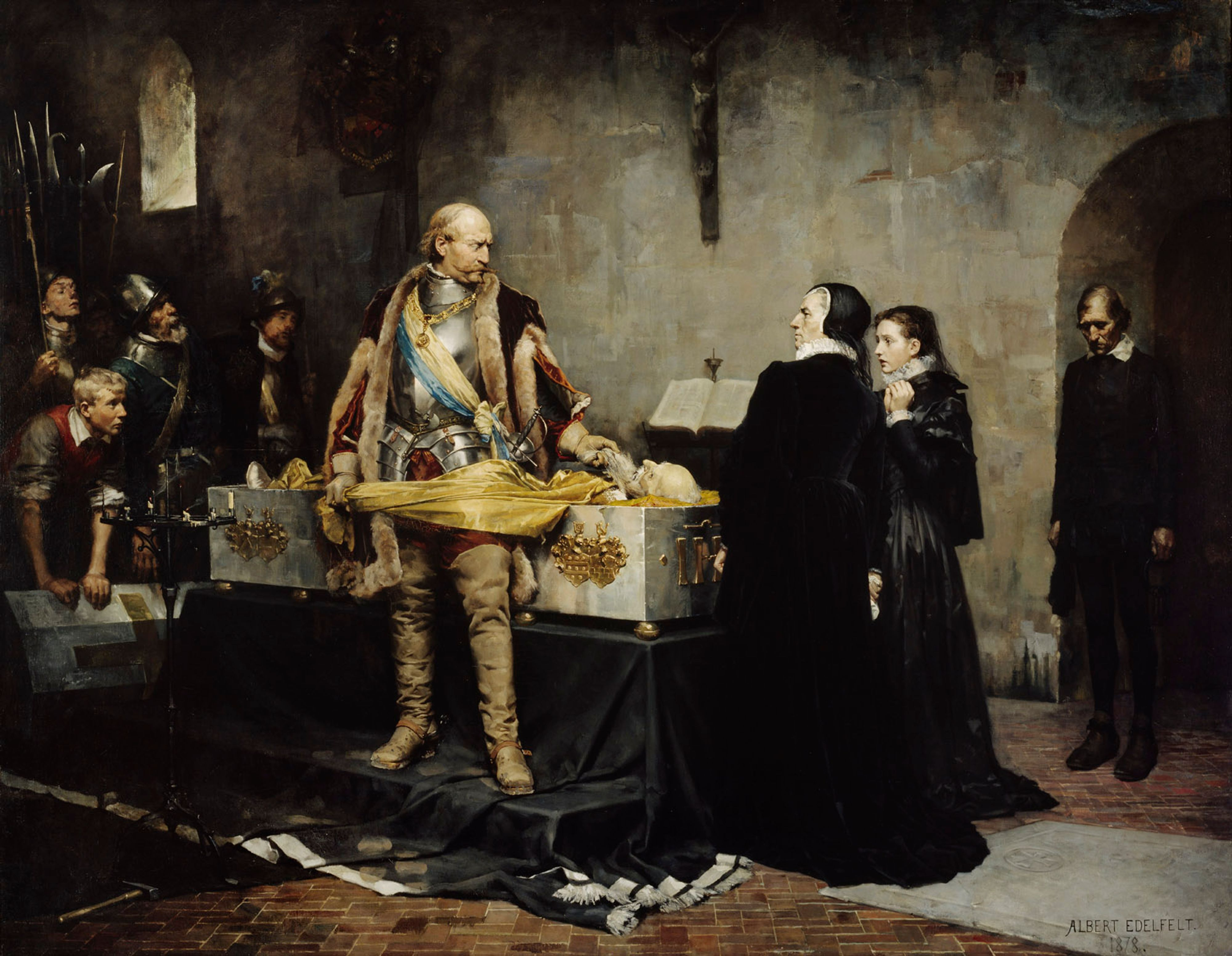
Duke Charles IX of Sweden insulting the corpse of his enemy, Klaus Fleming (1878)

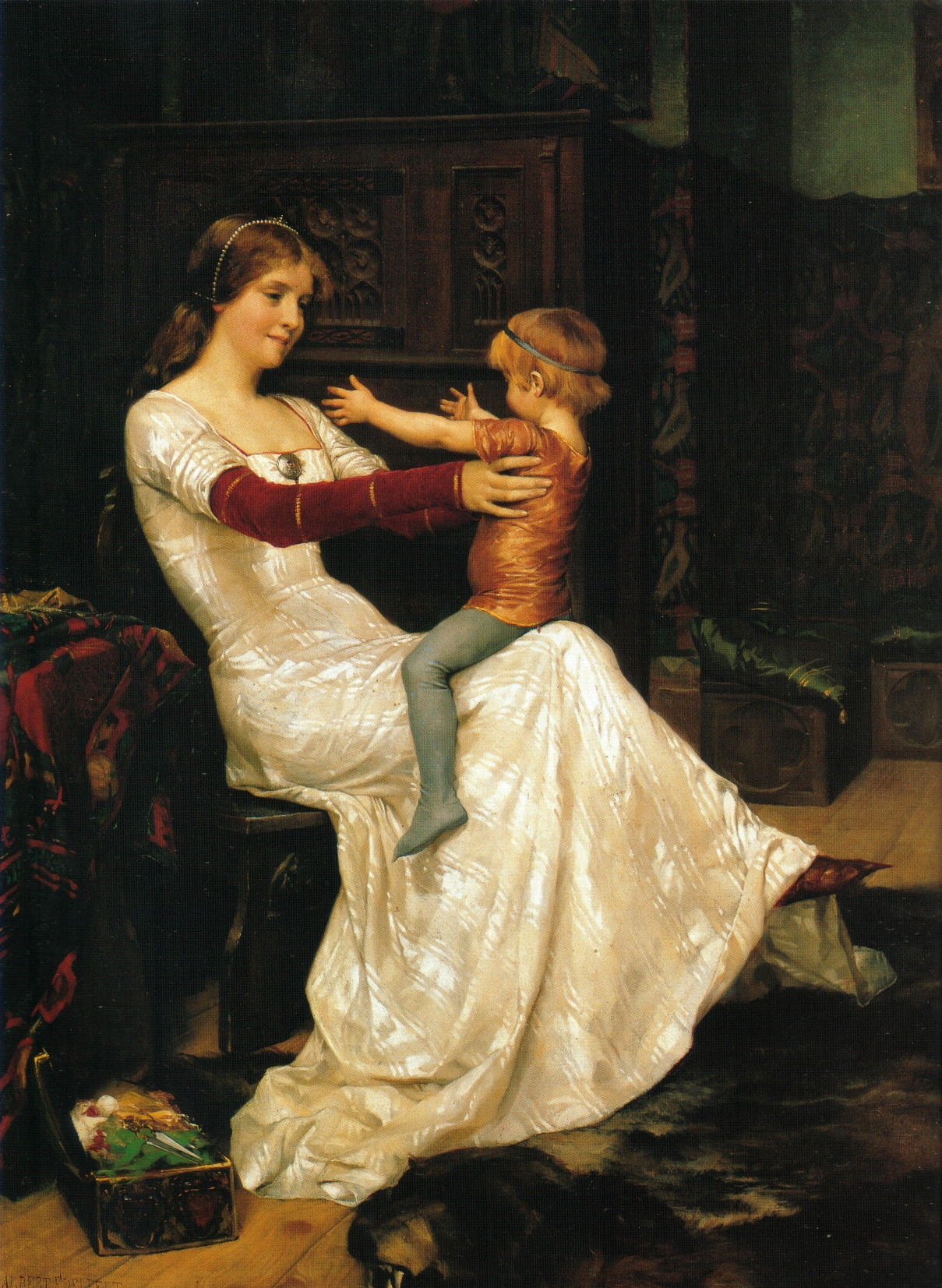
Blanche of Namur, Queen of Sweden, and Prince Haquin (1877)

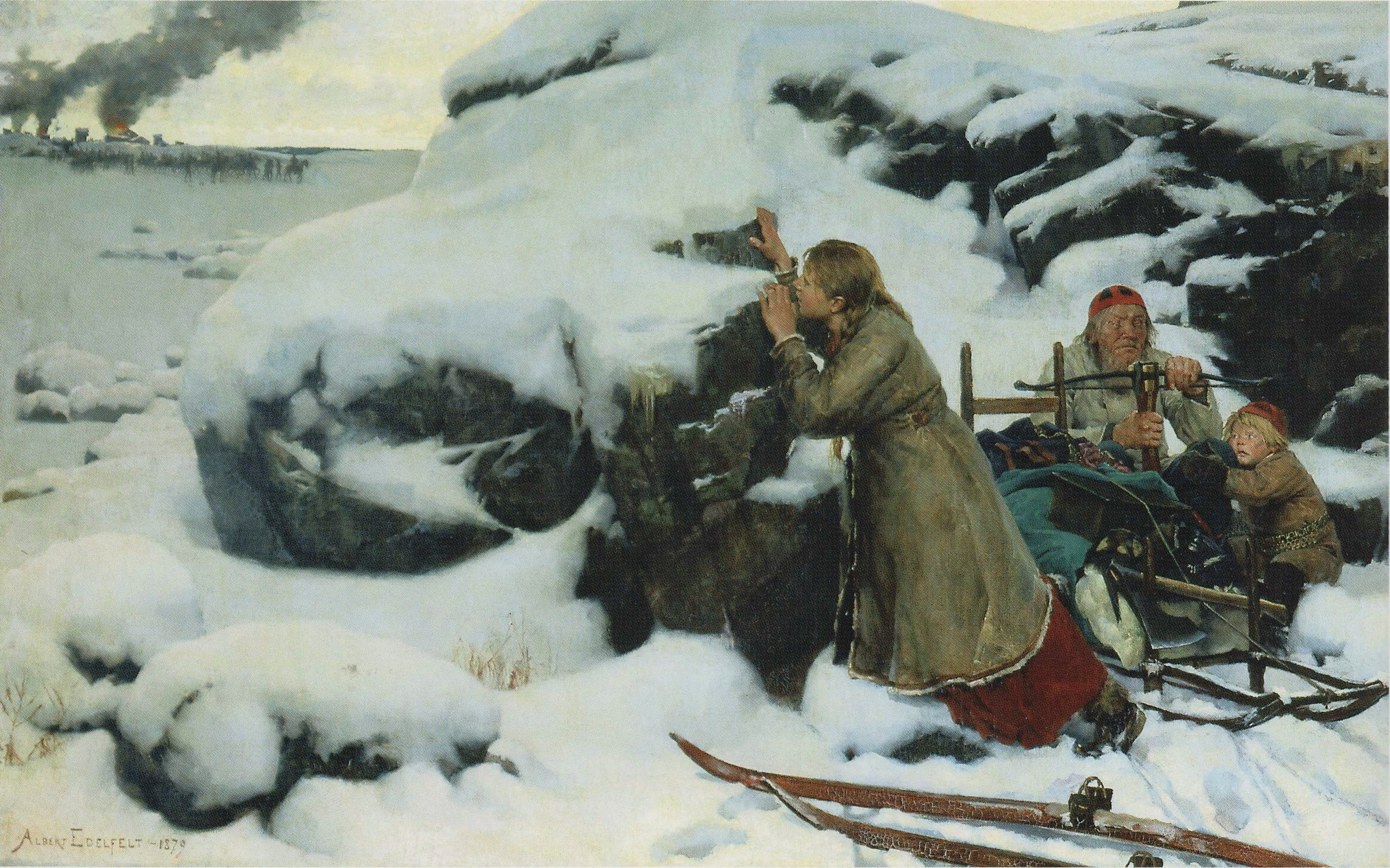
The Burnt Village – scene from the Finnish Peasant Revolt of 1596 (1879)

In 1879, he had his first success at the Paris Salon, with a history painting entitled The Burnt Village - a scene from the Finnish peasant revolt of 1596. The French critics praised the realism of the figures, but Edelfelt noticed the incongruity between the historical figures and the realistic outdoor setting. He wrote, "The problem right with historic subjects is that one cannot render the aspect of reality as in scenes that you have seen yourself." With that judgement, he almost entirely abandoned history painting and concentrated on painting in the open air.

He returned to Finland for a time, then returned to Paris in 1881 and rented a new studio at 147, avenue des Villiers.

=== Impressionism and Painting in Open Air ===
In the early 1880s, Edelfelt began to adapt some of the characteristics of the new Impressionist movement; natural settings, particularly parks and gardens and the seashore; intimate domestic settings; the play of light on the figures; and rapid execution, to capture the sensation of the moment. At the same time, he never became entirely an impressionist, following his realist training to concentrate on precise details and using a broad and complex palette of colors.

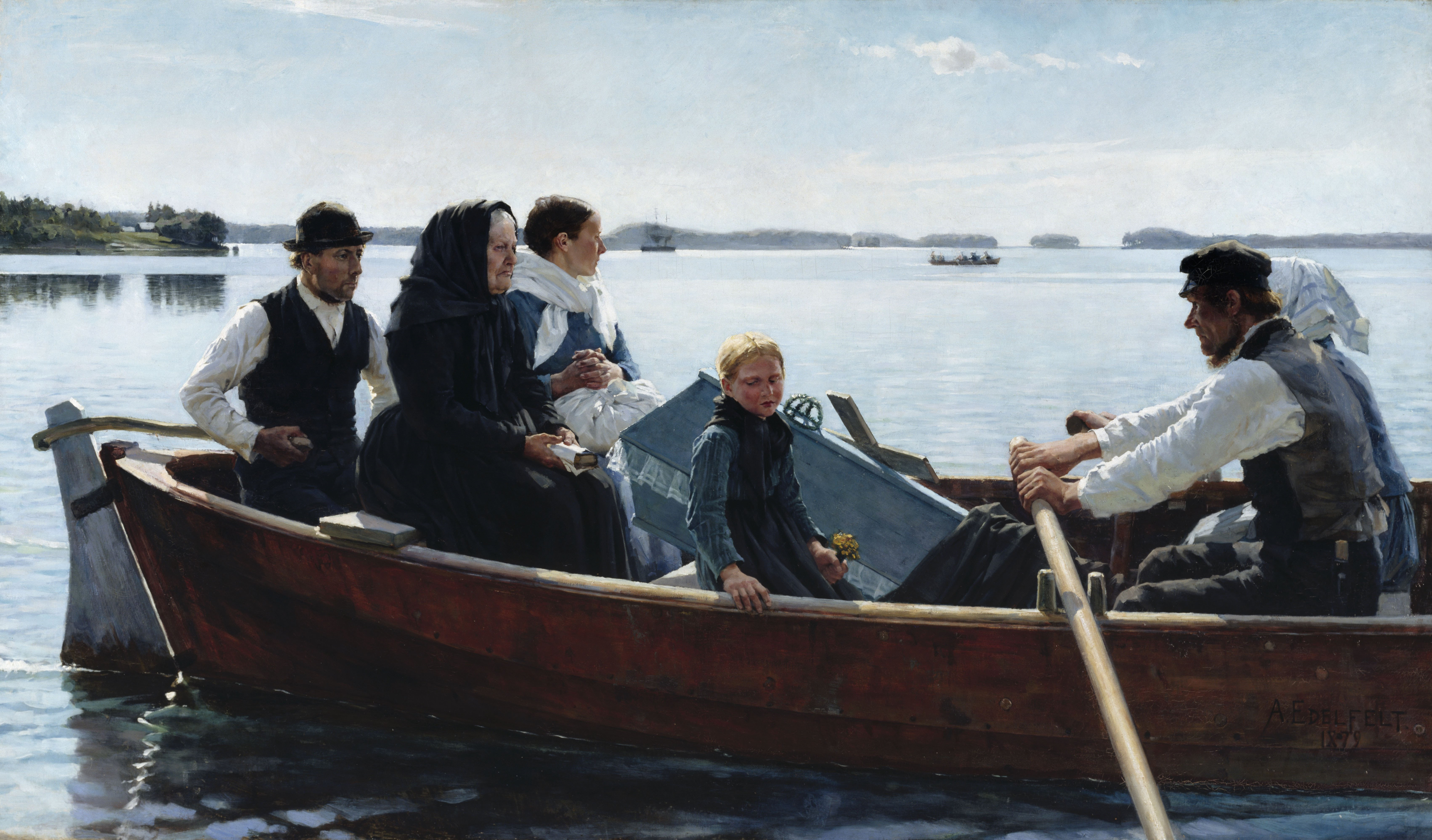
Conveying a Child's Coffin (1879)

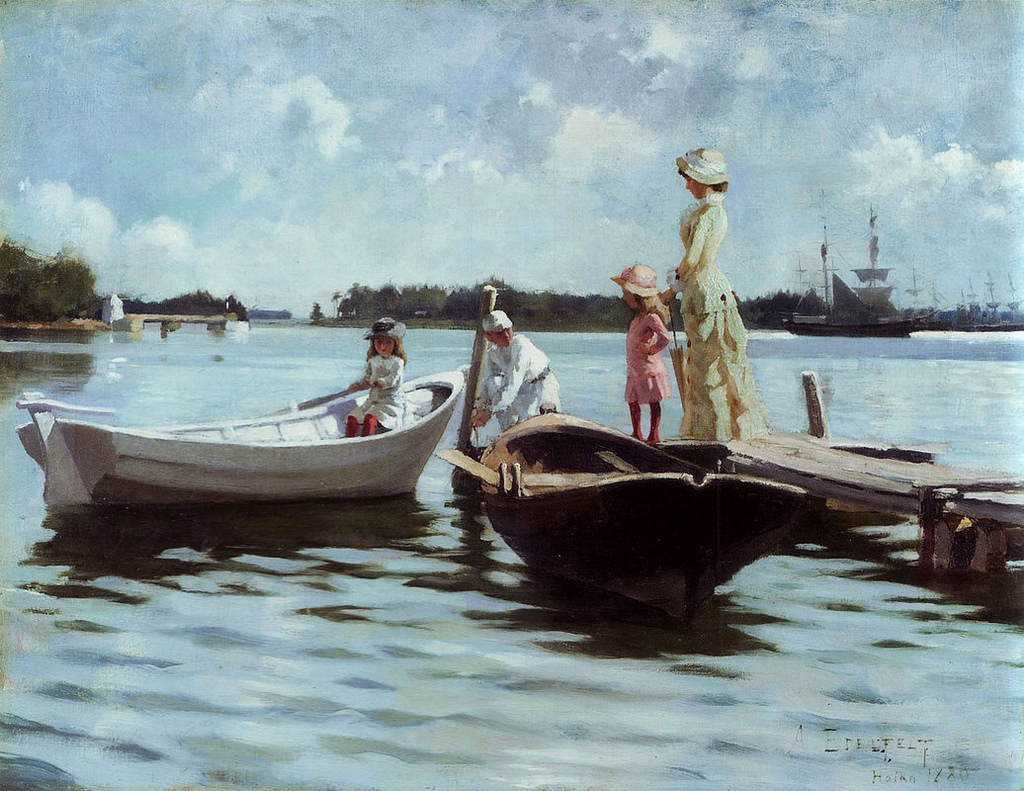
Summer Life in the Islets (1880)

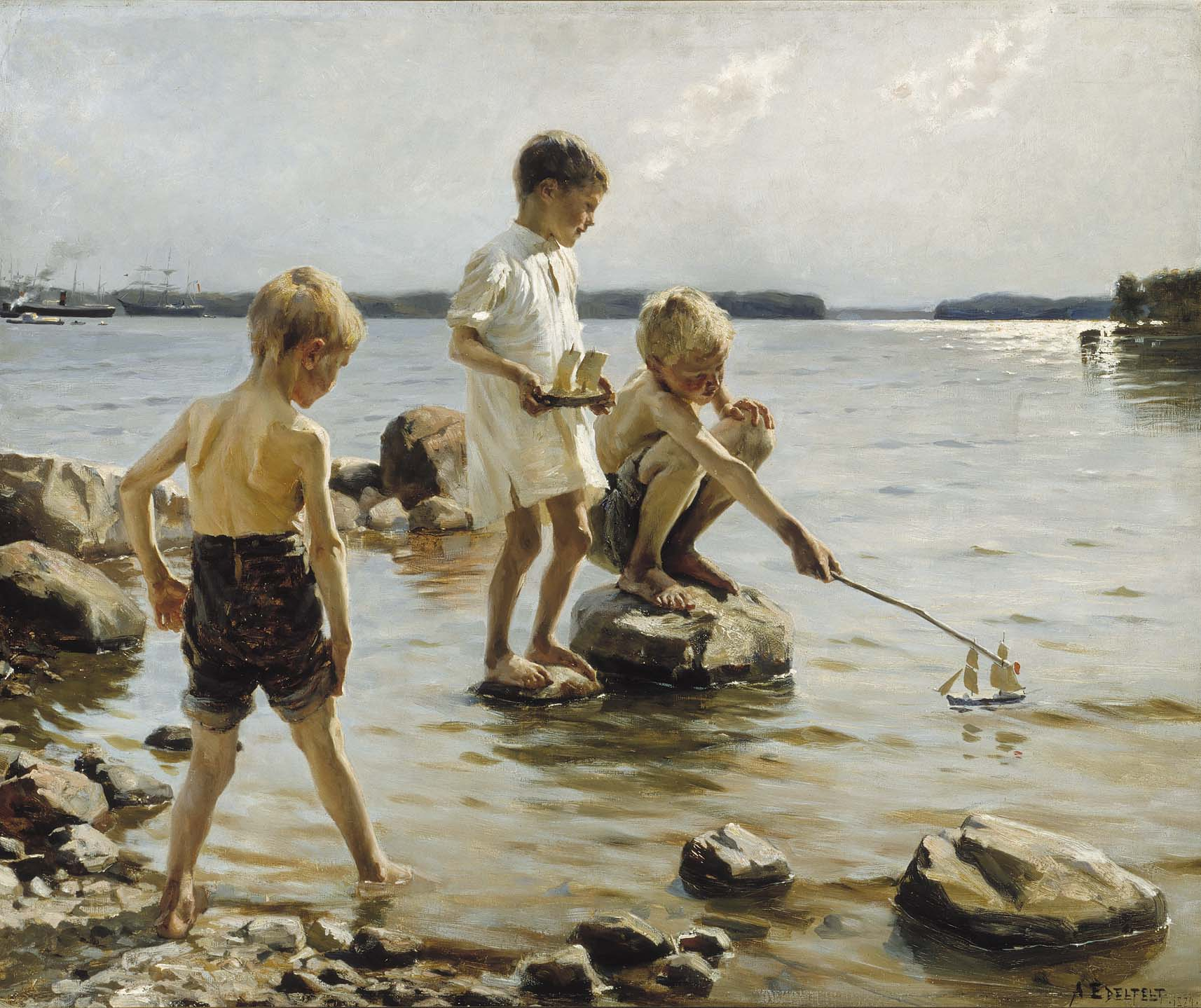
Boys Playing Upon the Shore (1884)

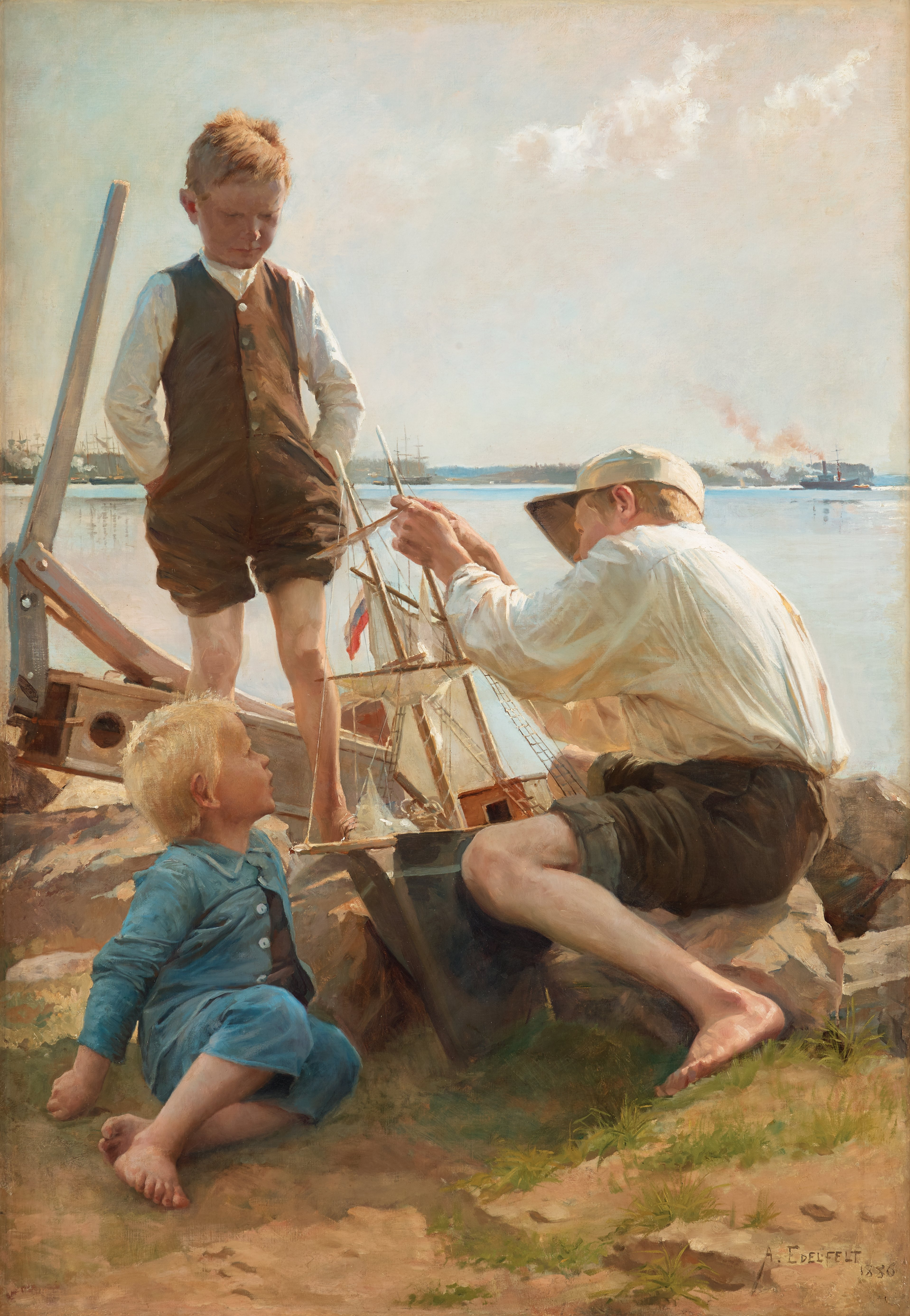
Shipbuilders (1886)

Throughout the 1880s, Edelfelt continued to paint outdoor scenes of life in Paris, displaying his talent for capturing the effects of light, combined with his precision of detail. During the same period he created wide variety of intimate domestic scenes, capturing the details of Parisian life.

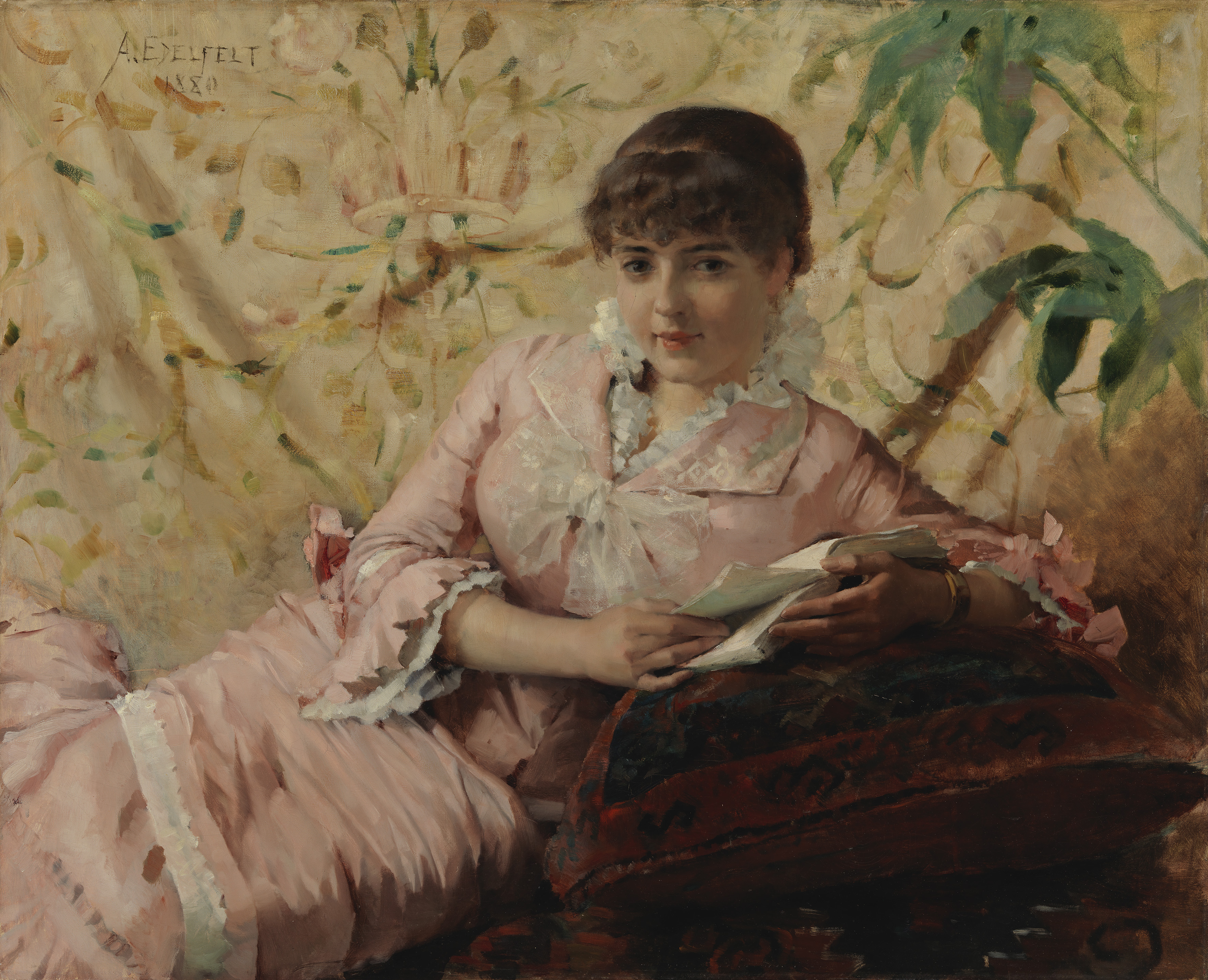
A Parisienne reading (1880)

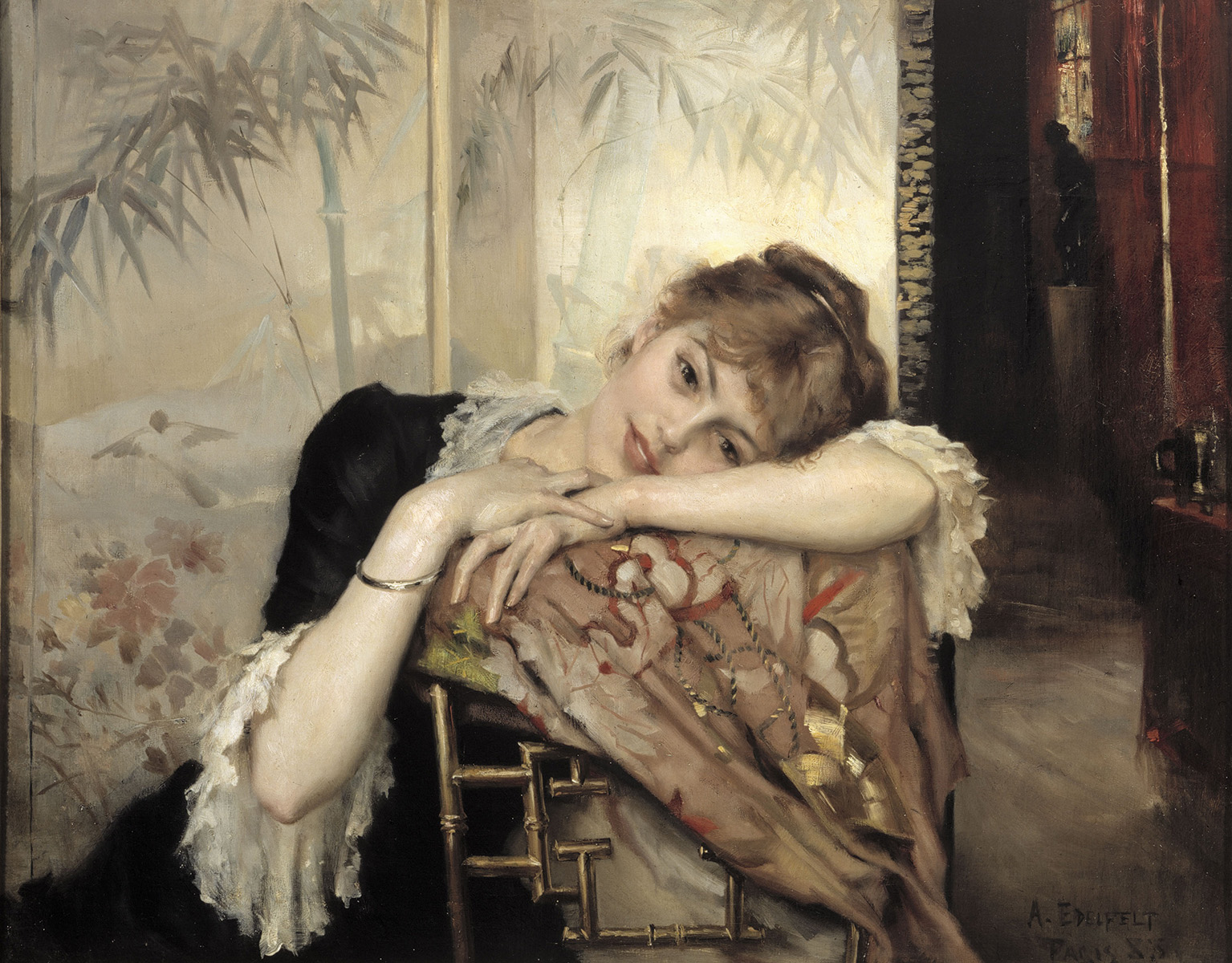
The Parisienne (Virginie) (1883)

Luxembourg Gardens, Paris (1887)

=== Portrait of Louis Pasteur ===
In 1880, Edelfelt became a friend of Jean-Baptiste Pasteur, the son of the famous chemist Louis Pasteur, who introduced him to Pasteur the following year. He became a close friend of the family and painted many of their portraits over the years that followed. Pasteur had a good sense of public relations and participated with Edelfelt in the planning of his own portrait.

Edelfeld's portrait of Pasteur in his laboratory, painted in 1885, had a great success at the Paris Salon of 1886 and became one of the most familiar images of the scientist. It gained the painter the award of the Legion of Honor when he was only thirty-five years old.

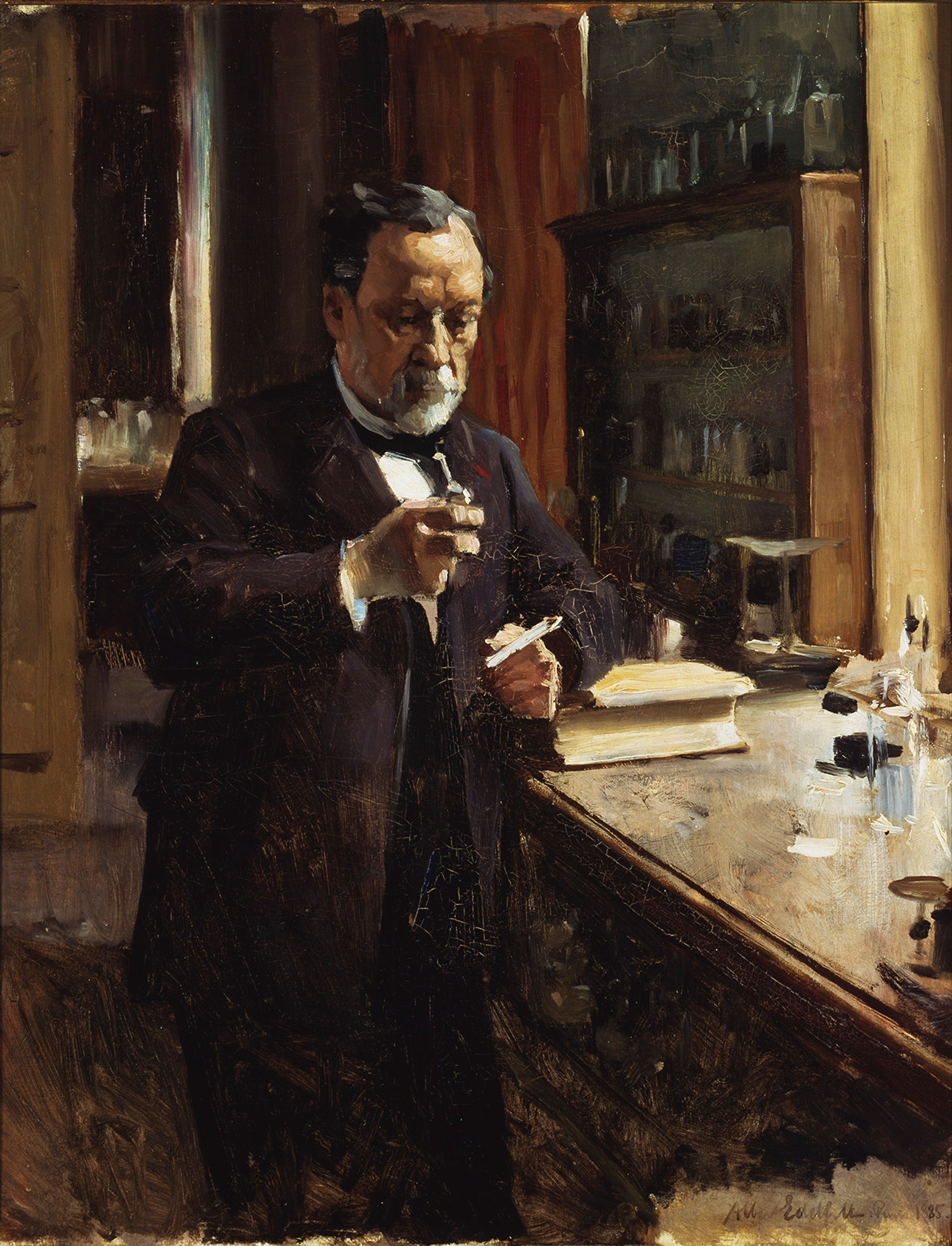
Study by Edelfelt for his portrait of Louis Pasteur

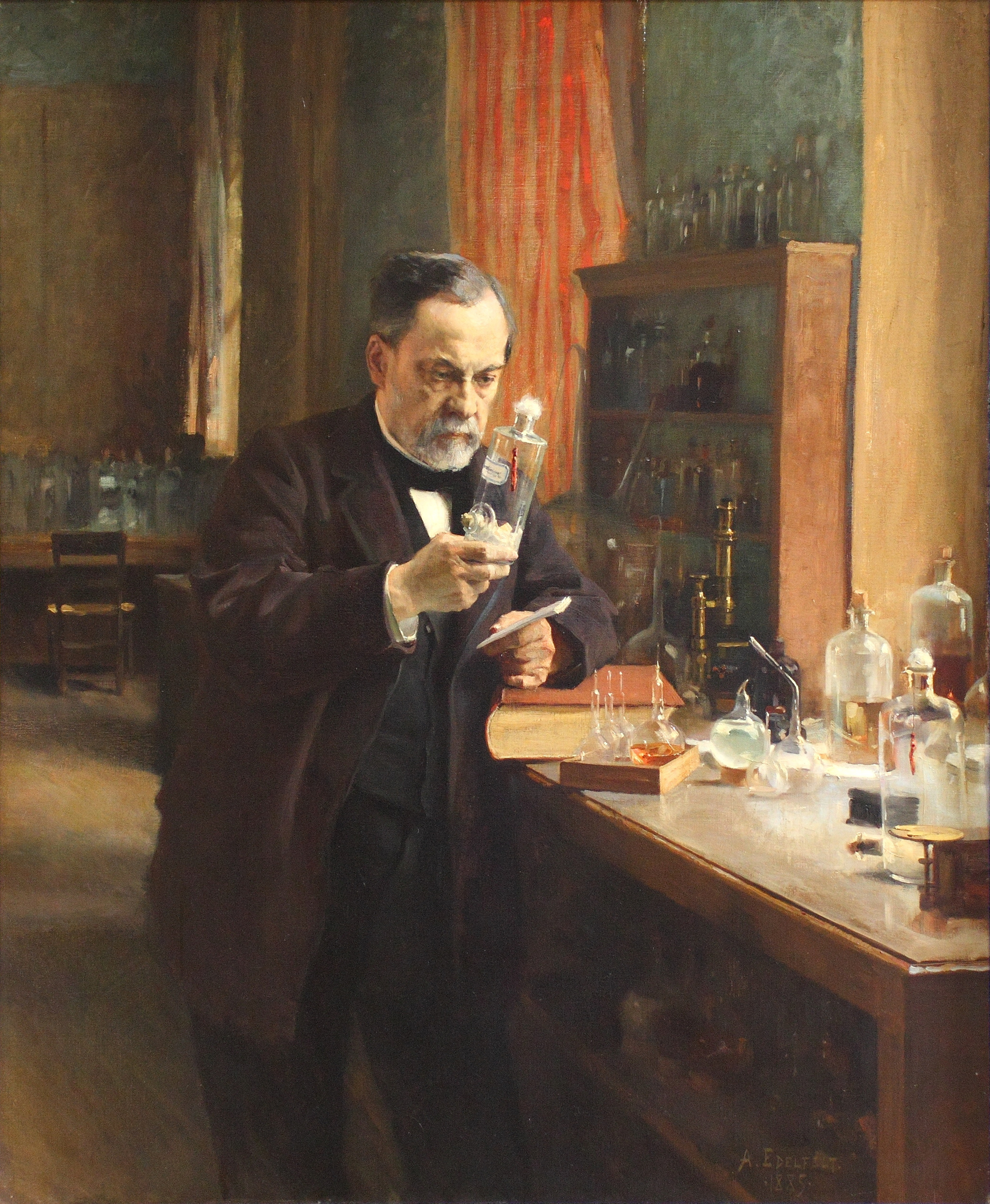
Final M. Louis Pasteur in his Laboratory (1885)

=== Russian Imperial commissions ===
Edelfelt began by painting portraits of his family and relatives, but his skills very quickly brought him a large clientele. In 1881, he visited Saint Petersburg, where previous the Imperial Academy of Arts had awarded him an honorary membership in 1878. The Grand Duke Vladimir Alexandrovich, brother of the Russian Emperor, commissioned him to make portraits of his children. This led to another commission to paint the children of Tsar Alexander III of Russia. In 1896, he returned to Russia to make a portrait of Tsar Nicholas II.

In February 1899, Tsar Nicholas II issued a decree suppressing the political liberties of the Finns. Edelfelt mobilised a network of Finnish artists and cultural figures with a petition to the Russian government, called "Pro Finlandia", seeking recognition of the independence of the arts in Finland. He also took on the role of a cultural diplomat as the commissioner of the Finnish participation in the Paris Exposition Universelle (1900).

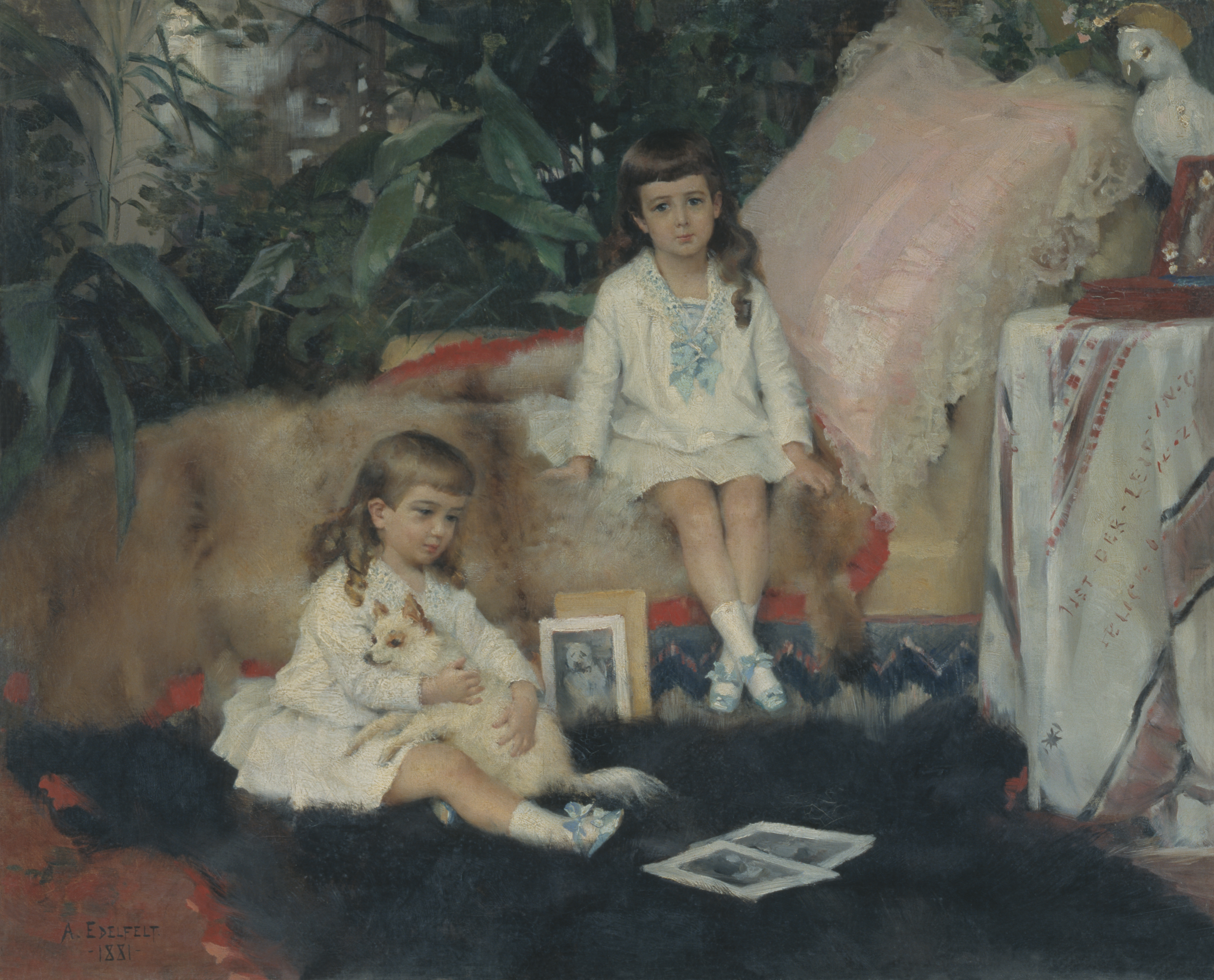
Children of The Grand Duke Vladimir, brother of the Russian Emperor (1881)

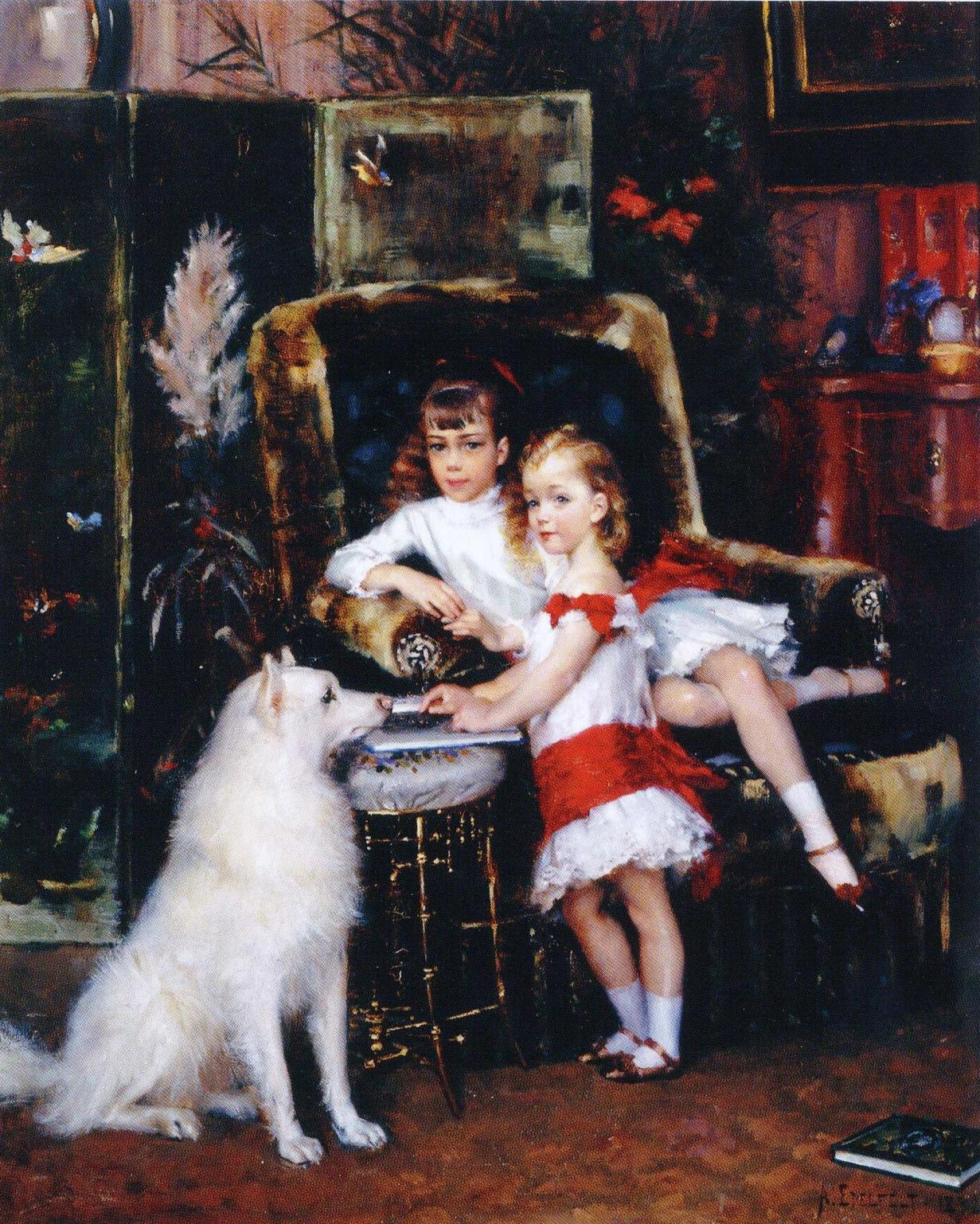
Children of Emperor Alexander III of Russia (1882)

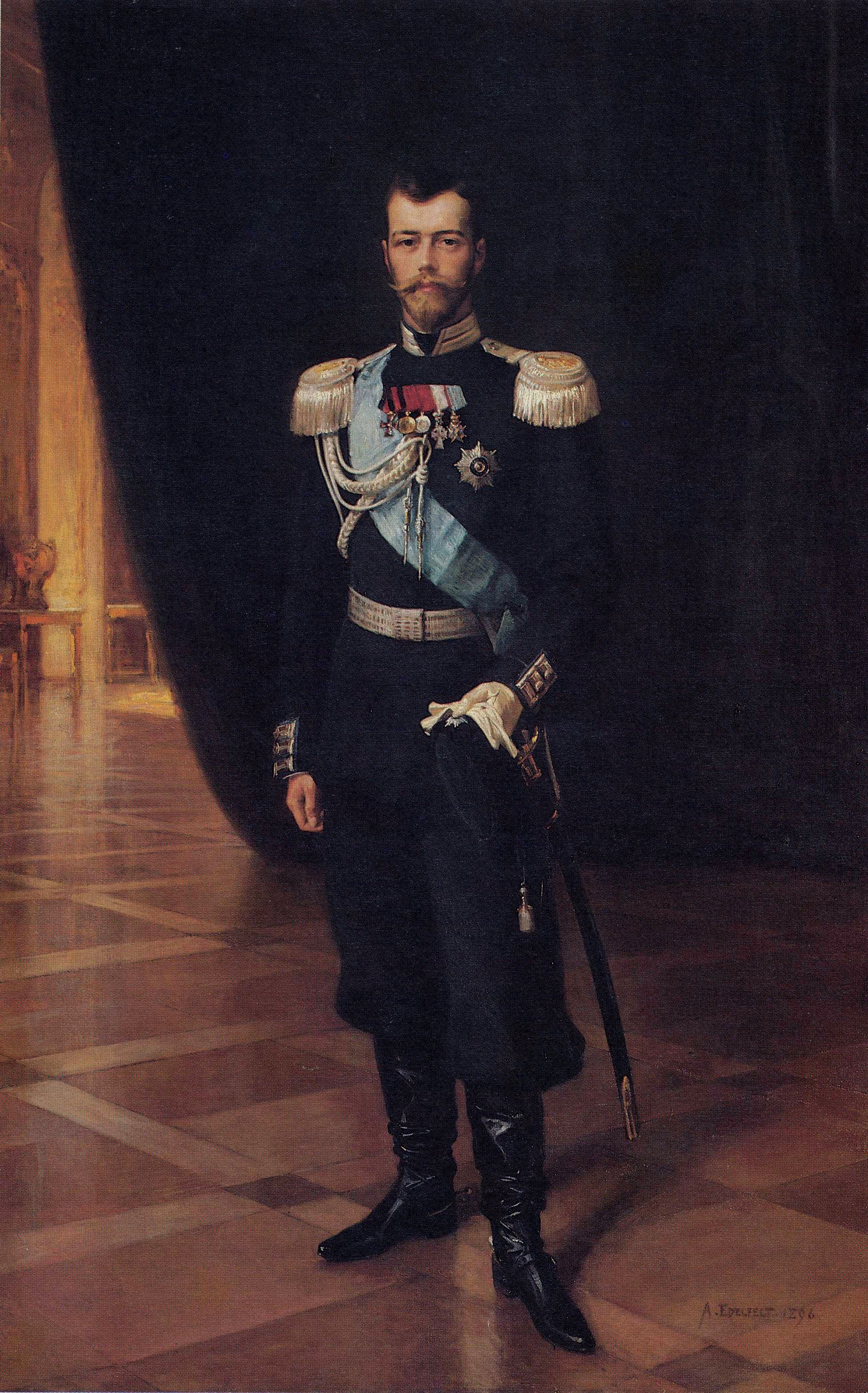
Portrait of Nicholas II (1896)

=== The Finnish Countryside ===
Edelfelt spent his summers in Finland exploring and painting. While his French paintings were almost all of Paris scenes, his paintings in Finland captured the scenery, people, and particular light of the Finnish countryside. He presented them regularly at the Paris Salon. For his painting of an outdoor church service on the coast at Haikko, near Porvoo, he made a series of oil sketches, to capture exactly the tonalities of the water and the sky.

In 1880, his family purchased a summer house at the coastal manor of Haikko, located in the southwest part of the country, and he established a studio there in 1883. He frequently used his family and local residents as models. His pictures possess a spontaneity and naturalness that result from his careful observation and empathy for the subjects.

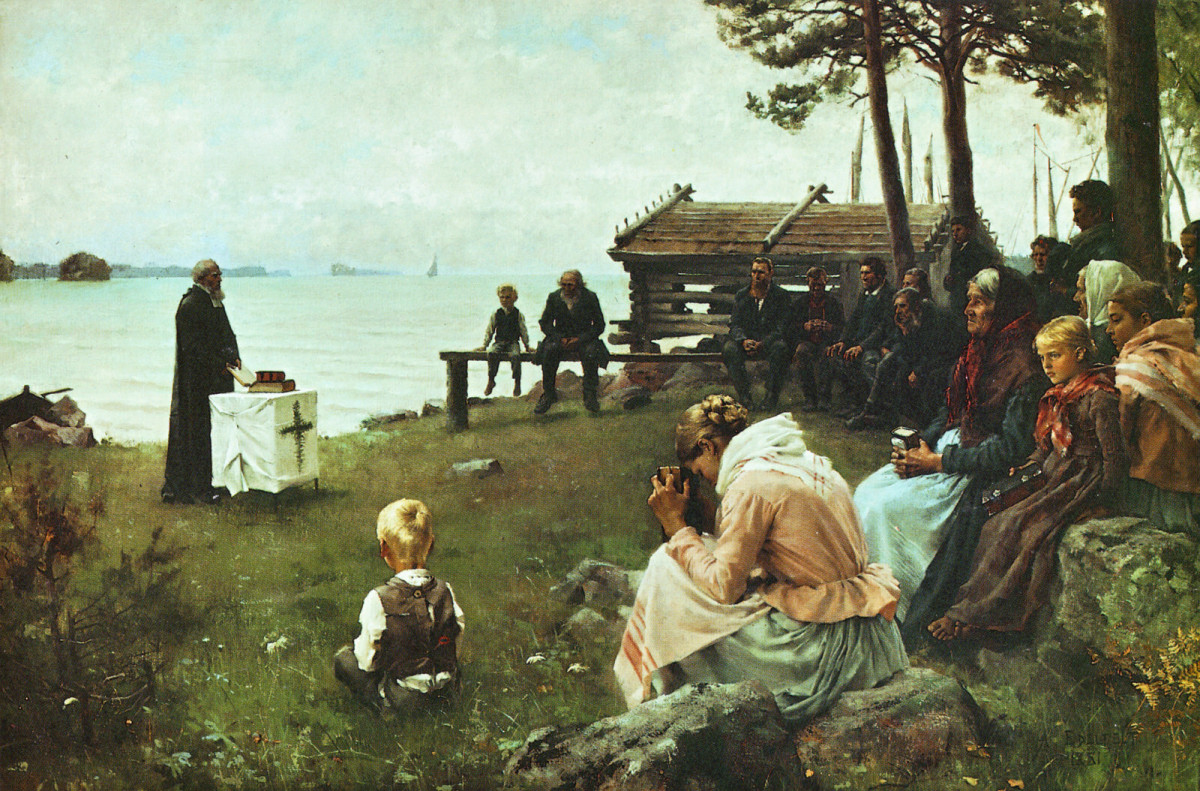
Church service by the sea in the Uusimaa Archipelago (1881)

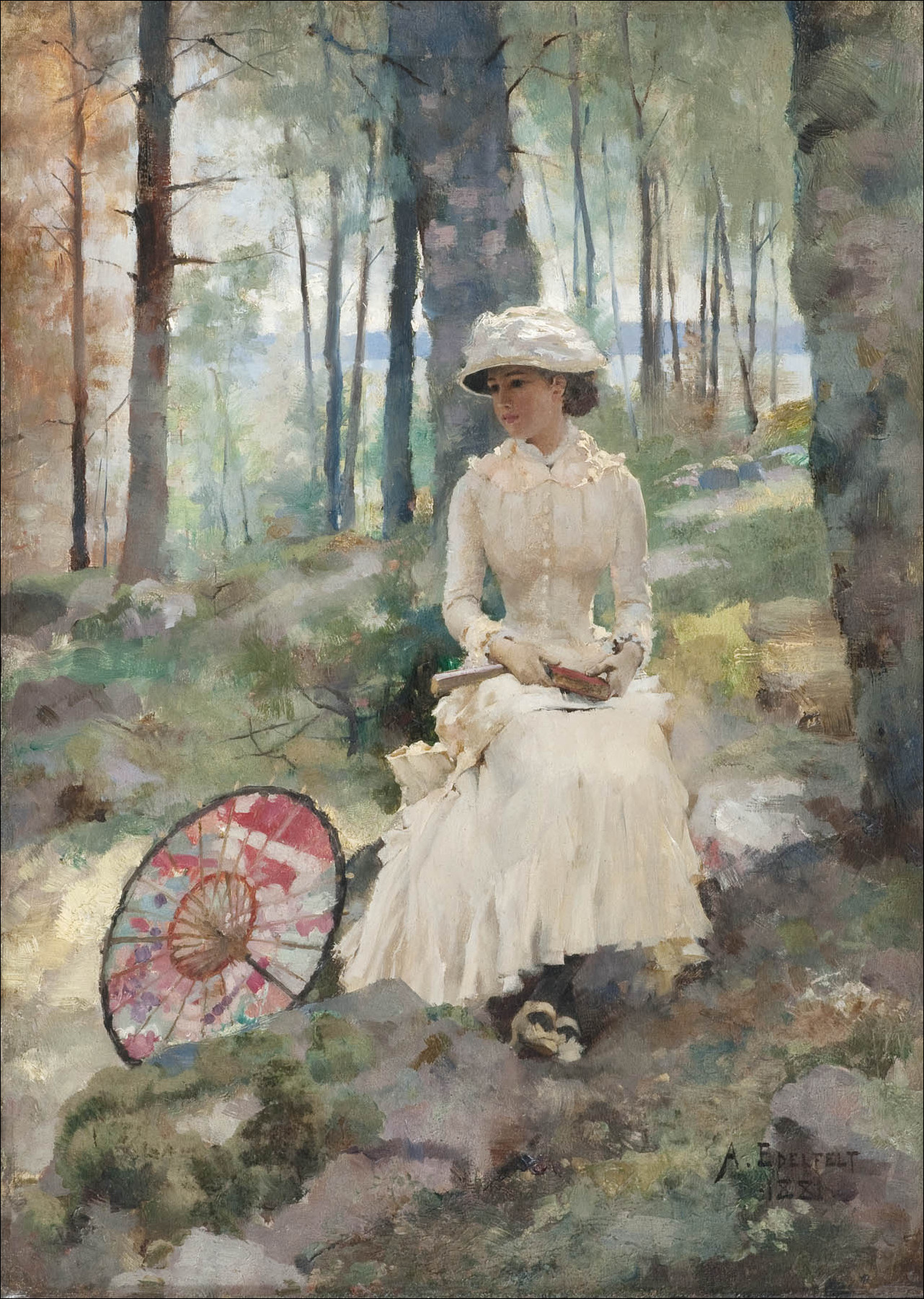
Under the Birches, 1881

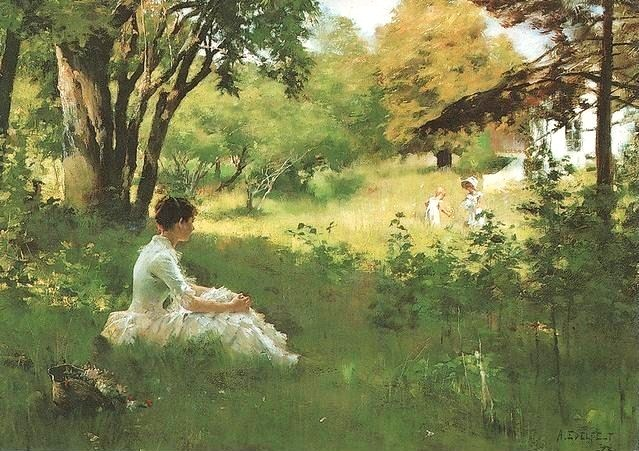
Summer, 1883

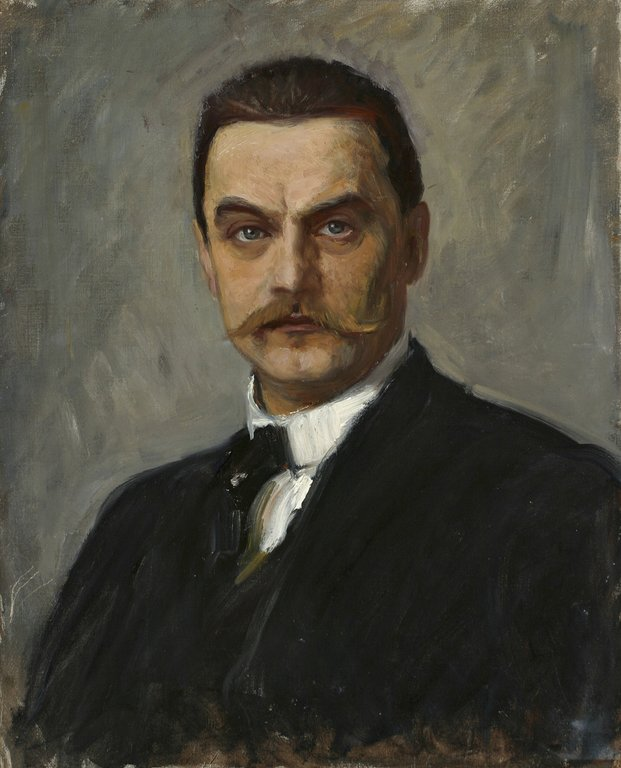
Self-portrait, c. 1887–1890

=== Portrait painting ===
Edelfelt, very early in his career, became a master of portrait painting, which provided the major part of his income. "Portraits for the soup, paintings for the glory", he wrote in 1878, citing the Belgian artist Antoine Wiertz. From 1880 onwards, he participated in the Paris Salon, and portraits were his major source of income.

Each portrait he painted involved a lengthy process. He created a series of preparatory drawings using pencil and crayon, followed by pastel colors, before completing the final oil painting. Besides paying close attention to the expression of the model and the pose, he also focused on the surroundings of the subject, including books, pets, or objects that could reveal the personality of the subject.

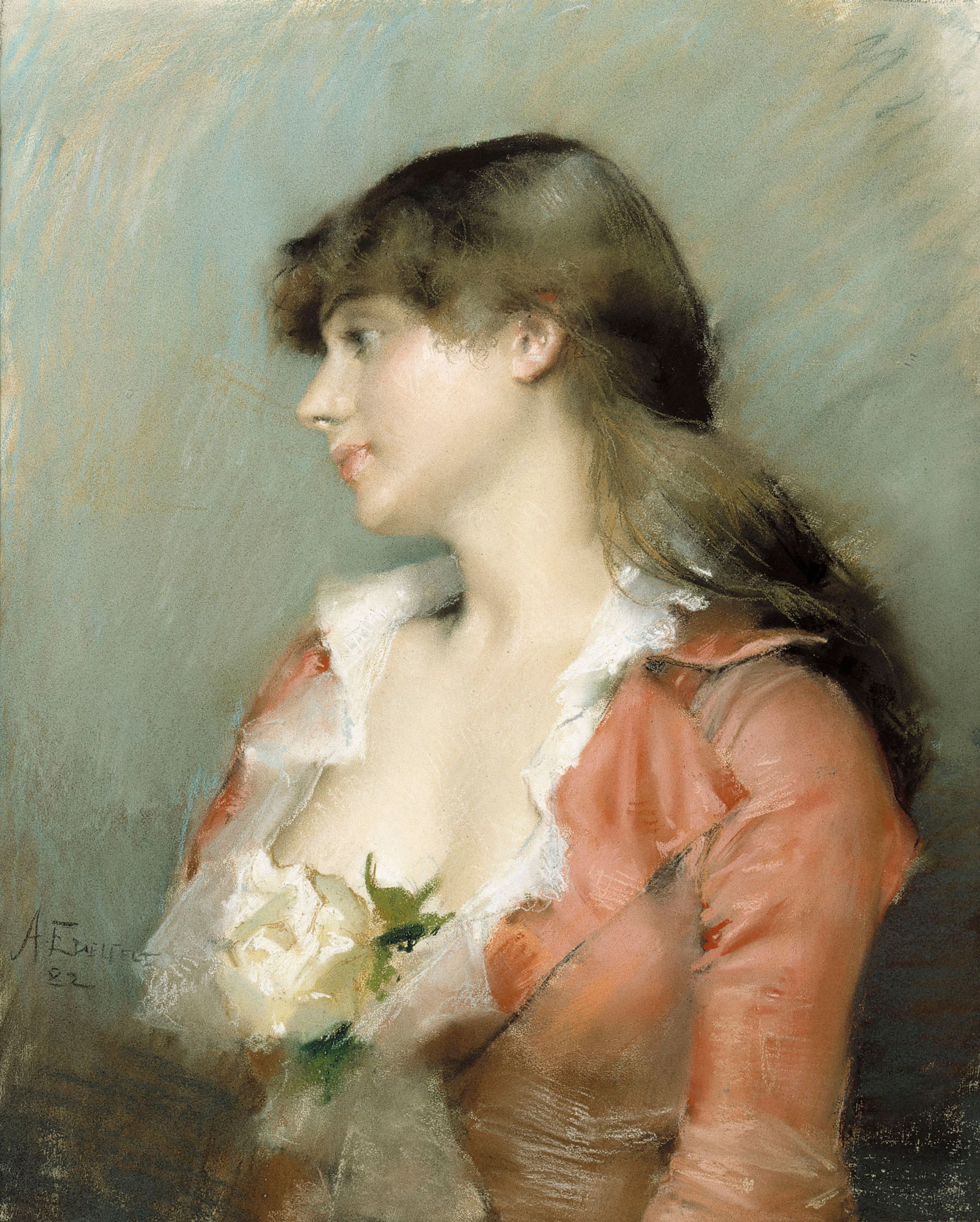
Profile of a young woman (1882)

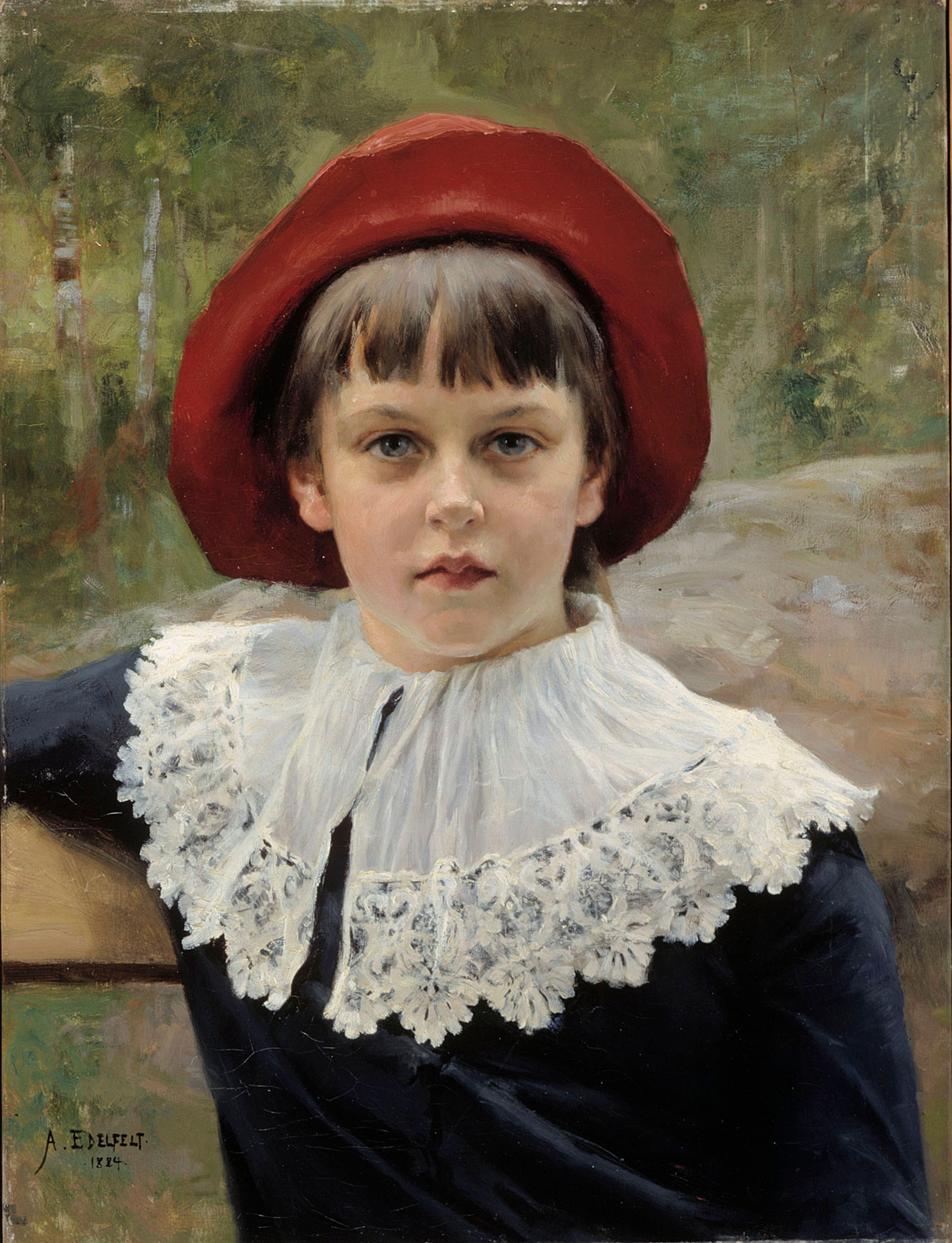
The artist's sister, Berta Edelfelt (1884)

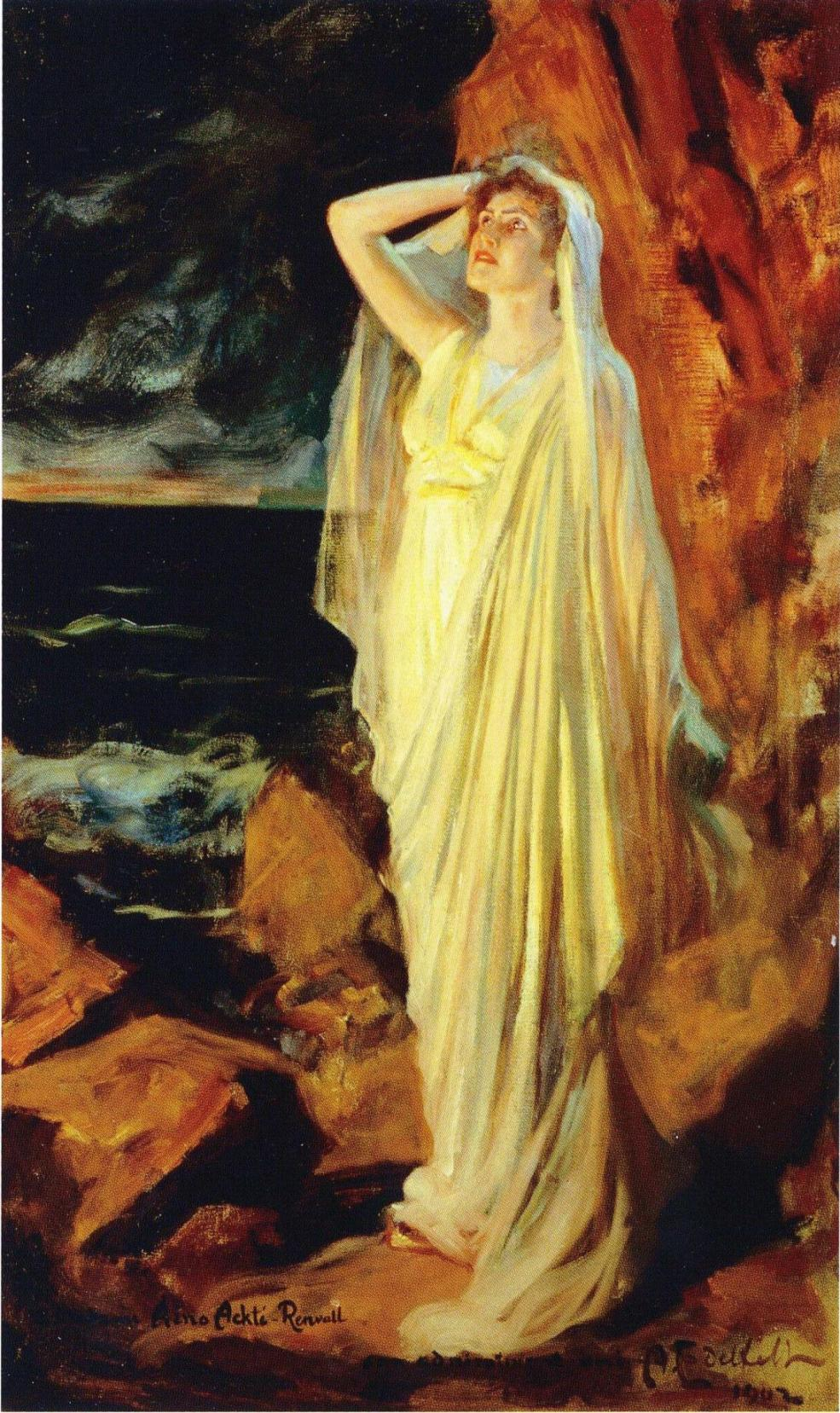
Finnish opera singer Aino Ackte in the role of Alceste (1902)

While he painted portraits of influential and famous people, such as Pasteur, many of his best portraits are not posed but depict Finnish men and women in natural settings, including village life or at sea.

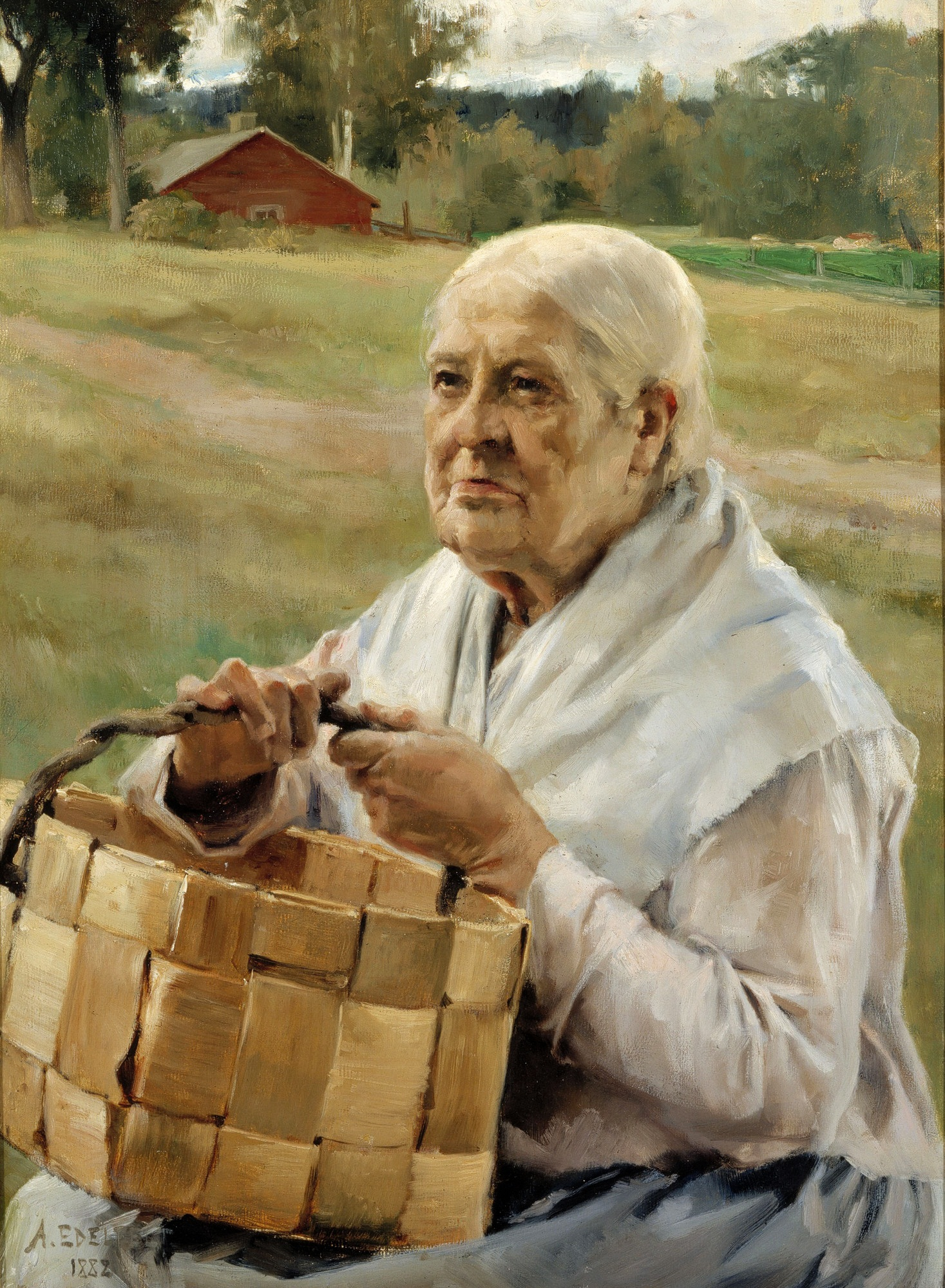
Elderly peasant woman (1882)

At Sea (1883)

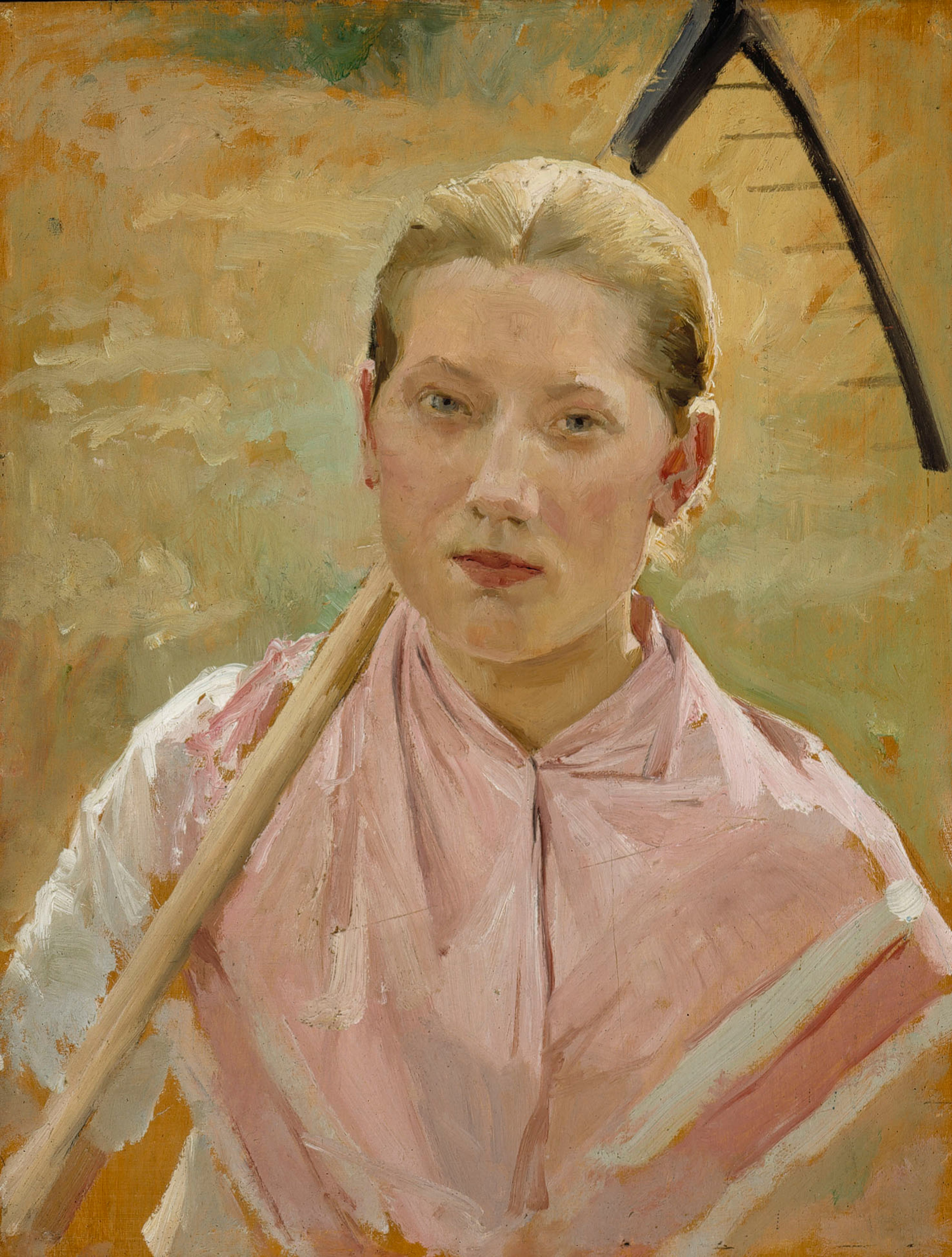
Girl with a rake (1886)

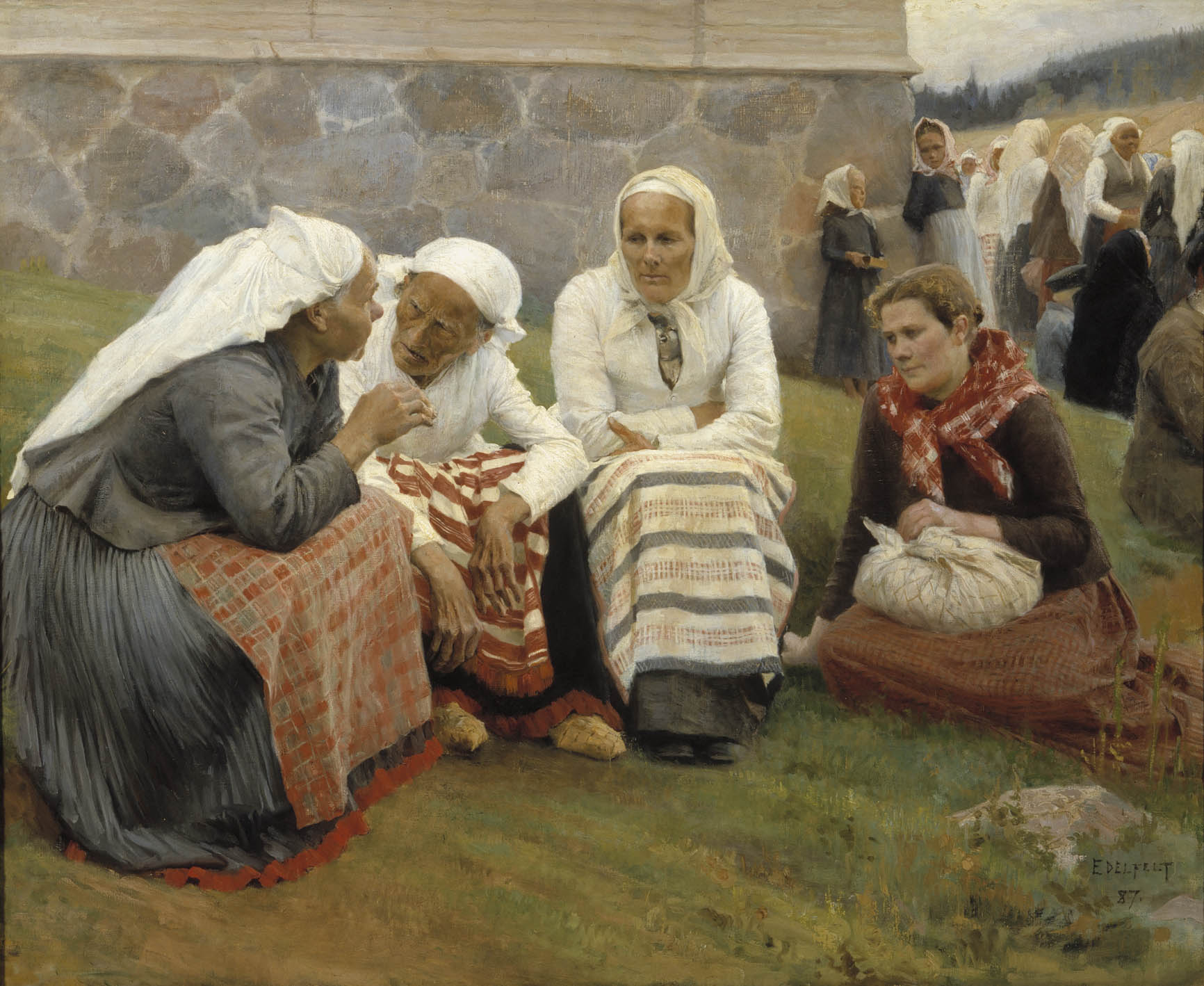
Women outside the church in Ruokolahti (1887)

=== Espagnolisme, Runeberg and religious art ===
In April and May 1881, Edelfelt spent five weeks in Spain, where he learned many new aspects of art and studied the phenomenon called espagnolisme, which is the impact that Spanish influences had on France starting from the 1830s. In Spain, Edelfelt also gained a deeper grasp of Gypsy culture and Orientalism, which had always interested him. His most important picture from Granada is Gitana Dancing I, a genre portrait of a dancing Gypsy girl.

In the 1890s, he became interested in illustrating poetry. Edelfelt admired the poet Johan Ludvig Runeberg, who was a friend of the family. The company of Runeberg had a lasting impact on Edelfelt, who occasionally drew inspiration from scenes in Finnish history for his paintings. Edelfelt went on to illustrate Runeberg's epic poem The Tales of Ensign Stål.

Edelfelt also later dabbled in religious painting, and in his 1890 Christ and Mary Magdalene he set a biblical scene in the Finnish landscape, influenced by Kanteletar.

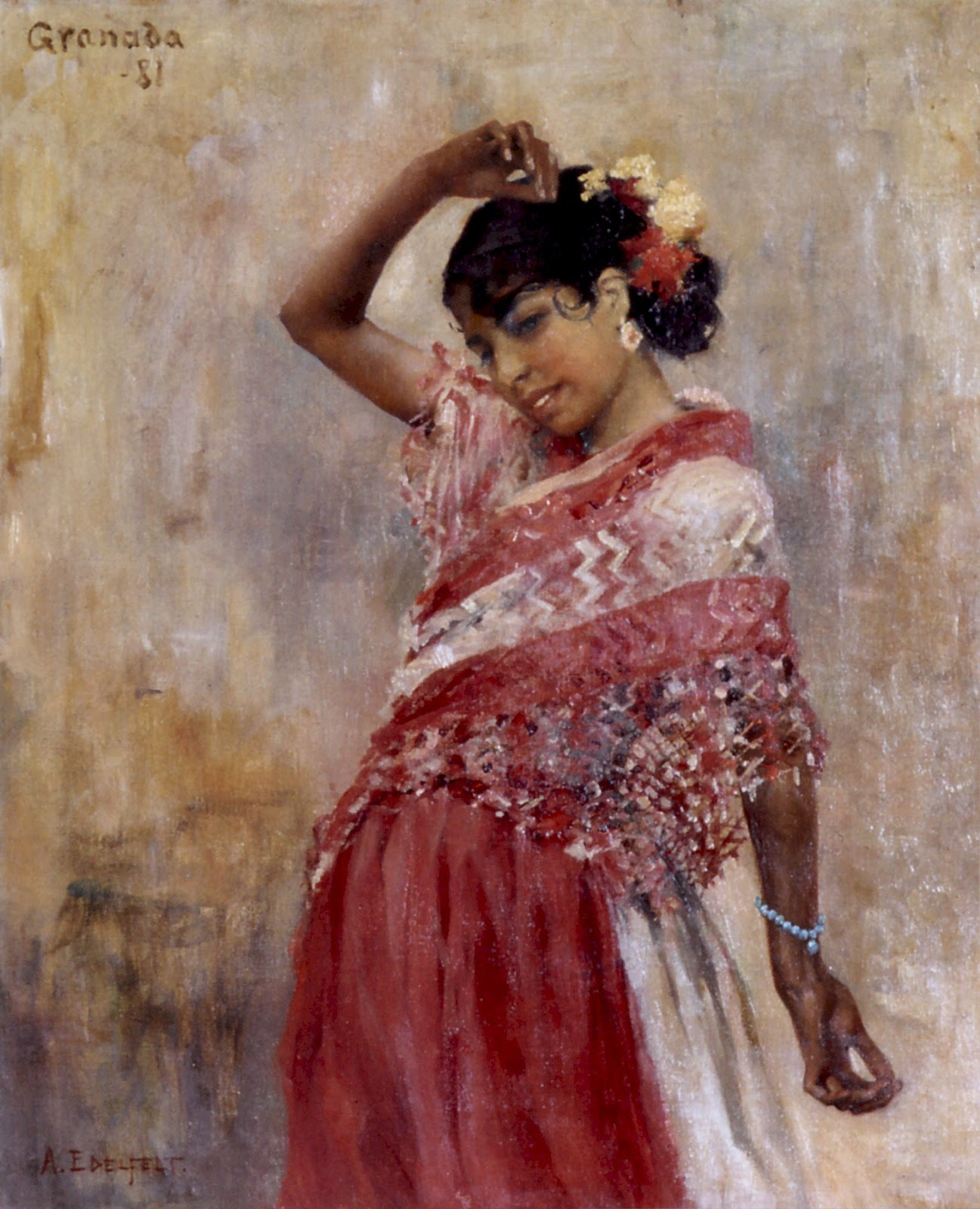
Gitana Dancing I, 1881

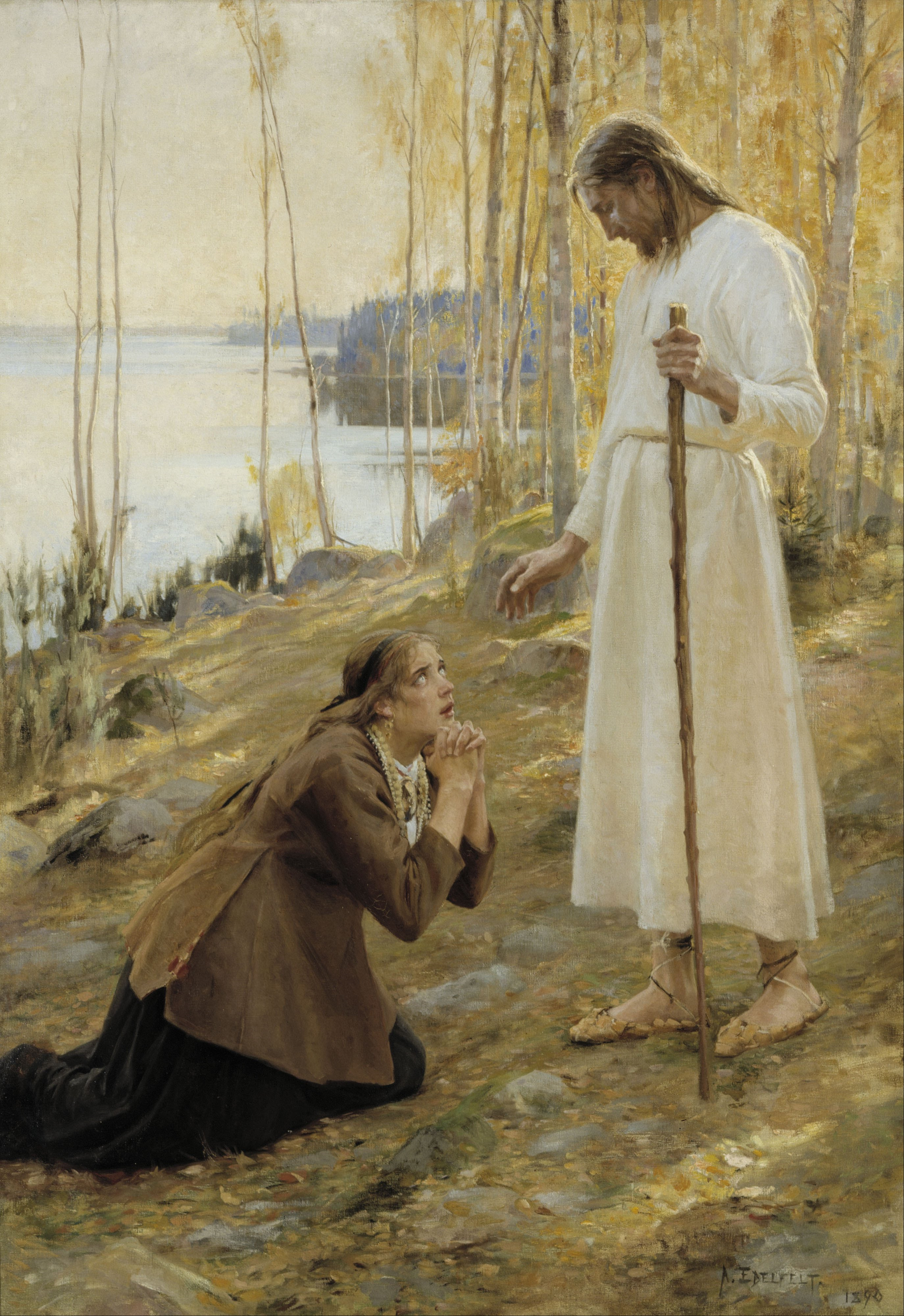
Christ and Mary Magdalene, a Finnish Legend, 1890 (fi)

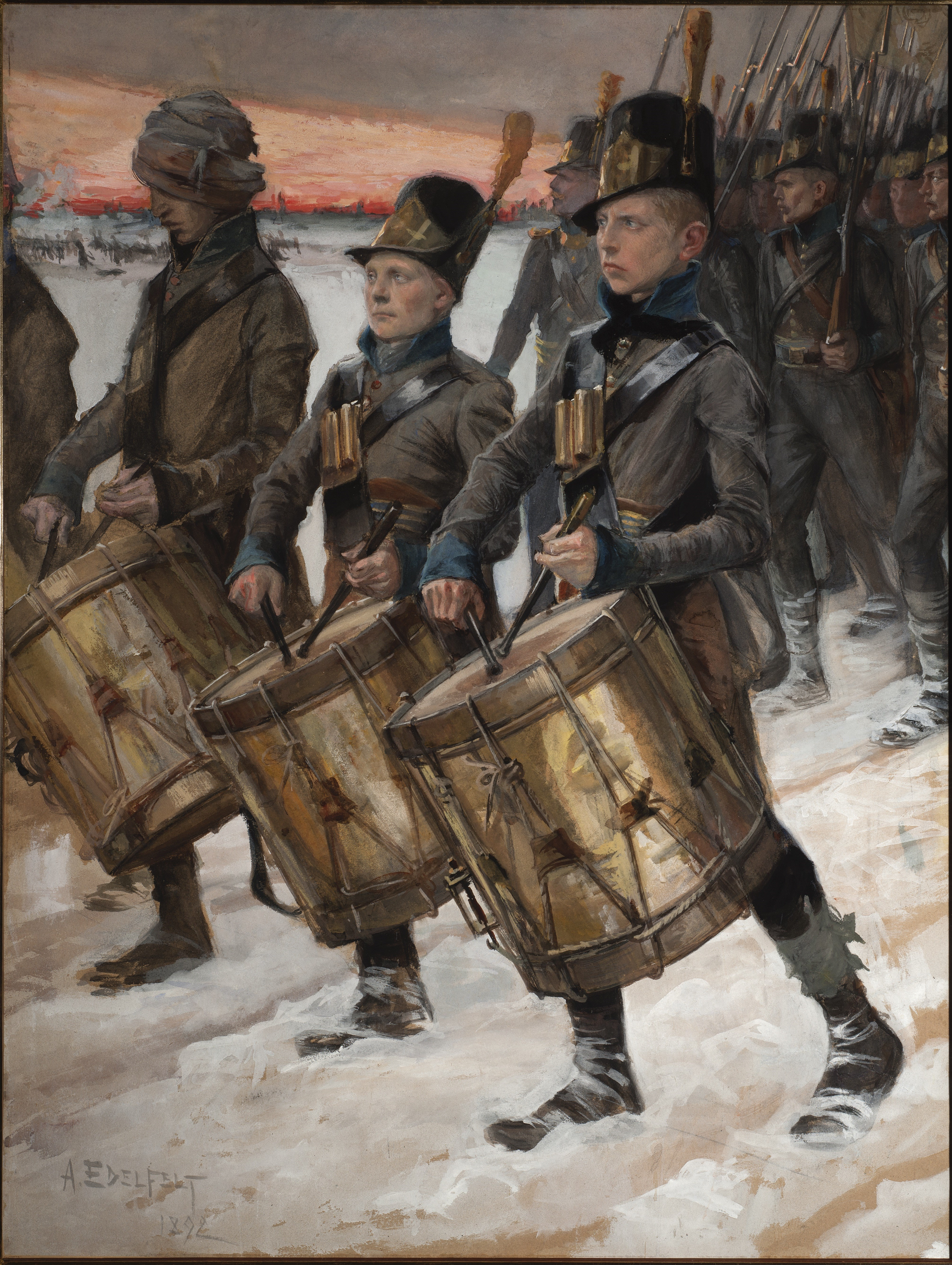
March of the Björneborg Regiment, 1892

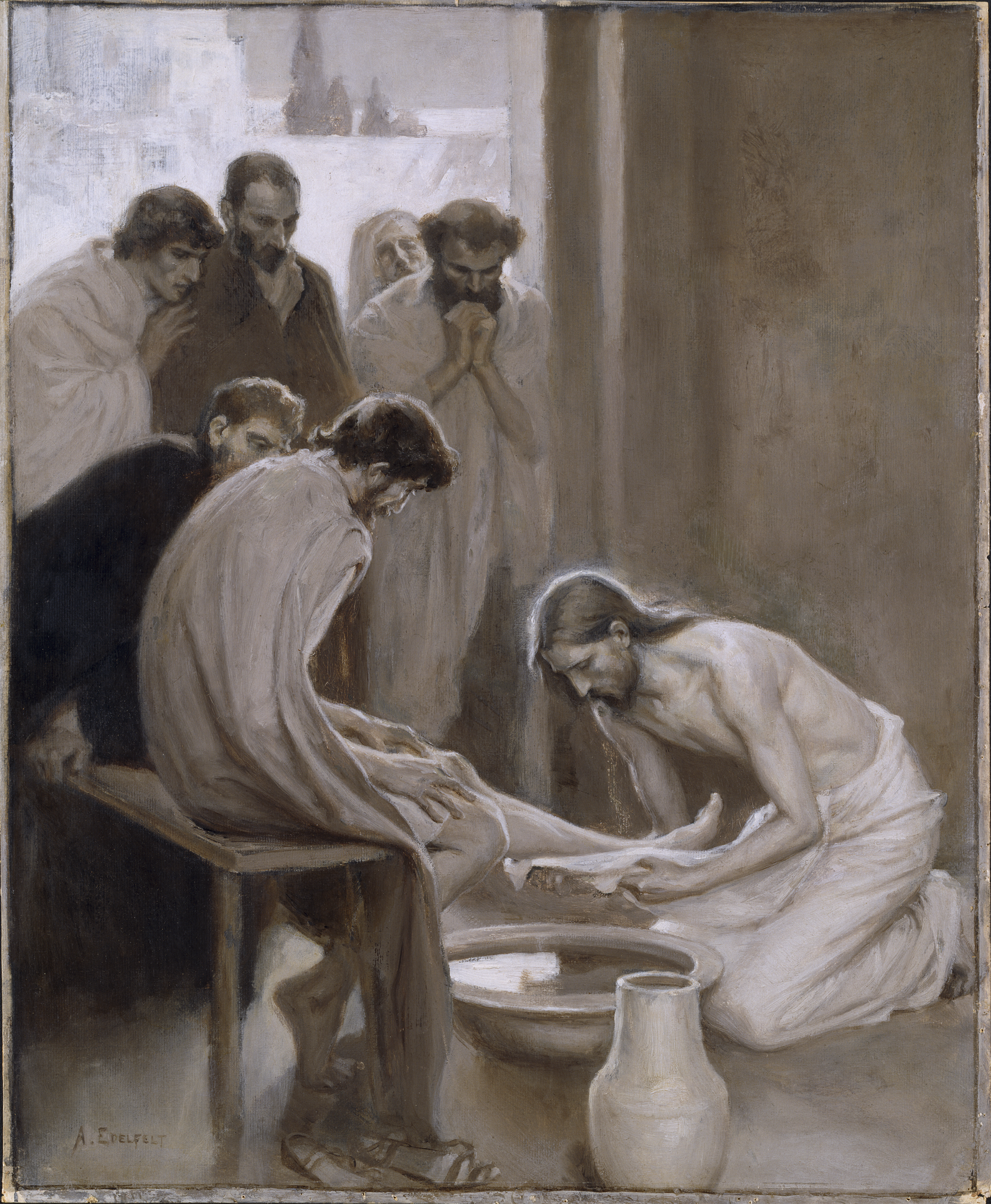
Jesus Washing the Feet of his Disciples, 1898

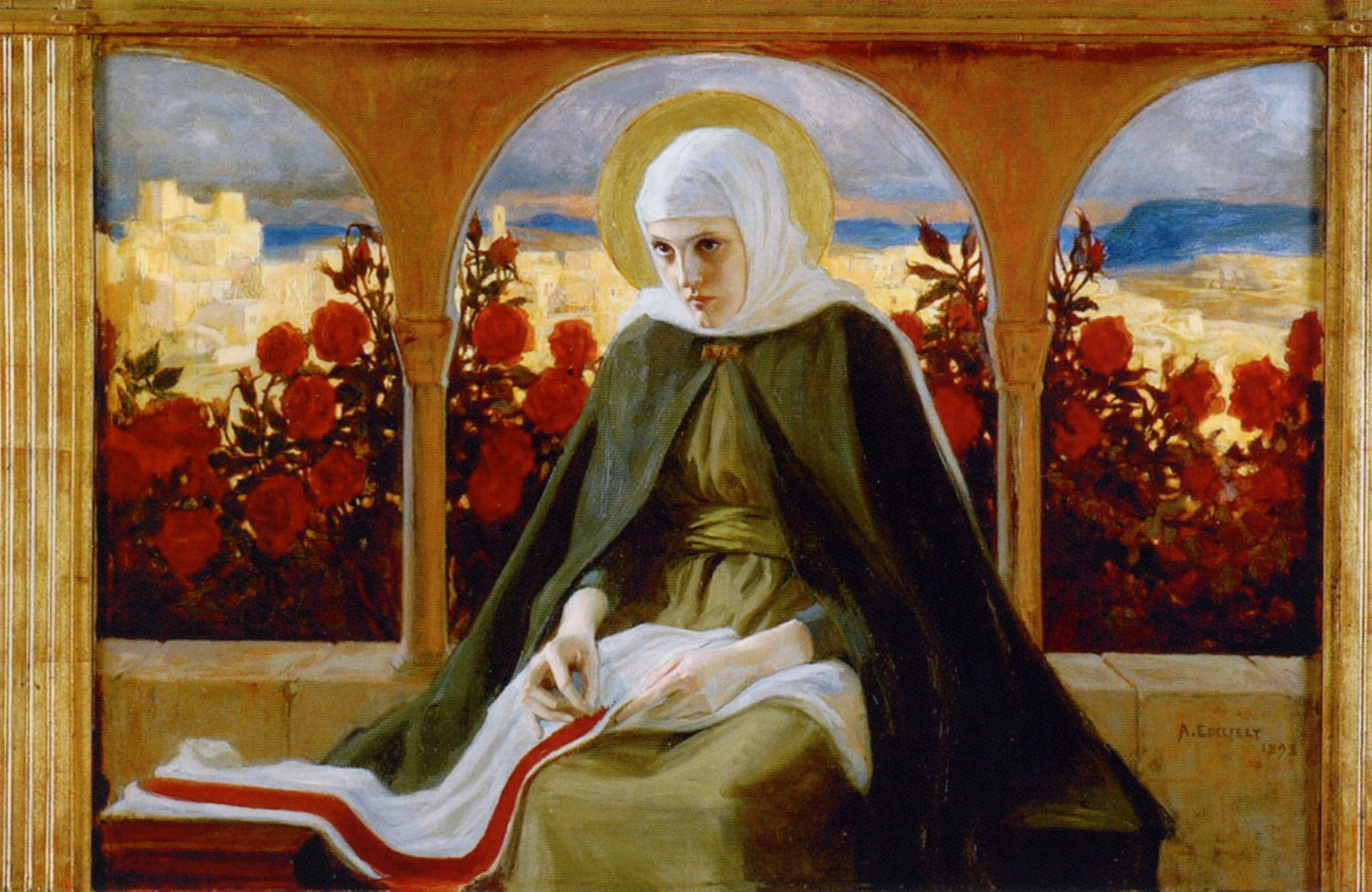
Virgin Mary in the Rose Garden, 1898

== Personal life ==
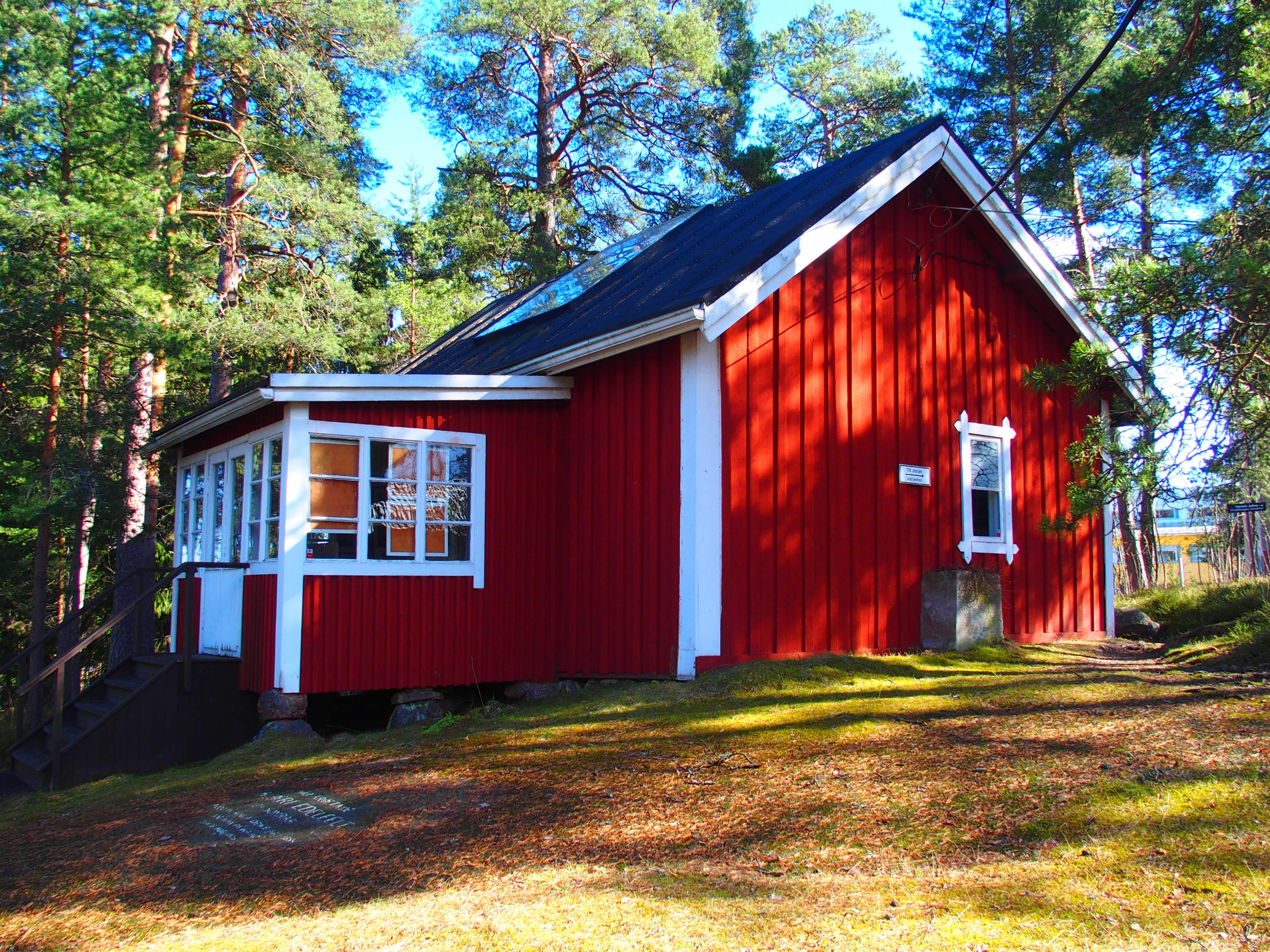
Edelfelt's summer house in Haikko, Finland

He sent his mother hundreds of letters when he was away. In Paris, he shared a studio with the American Julian Alden Weir, who introduced him to John Singer Sargent. He had romantic relationships with numerous women, including Antonia Bonjean and Virginie in Paris. He married Baroness Anna Elise "Ellan" de la Chapelle in 1888, and the same year they had one child, Erik. They had known each other since childhood, but their marriage did not have a lot of warmth. The death of his mother in 1901 affected him greatly.

== Death and legacy ==
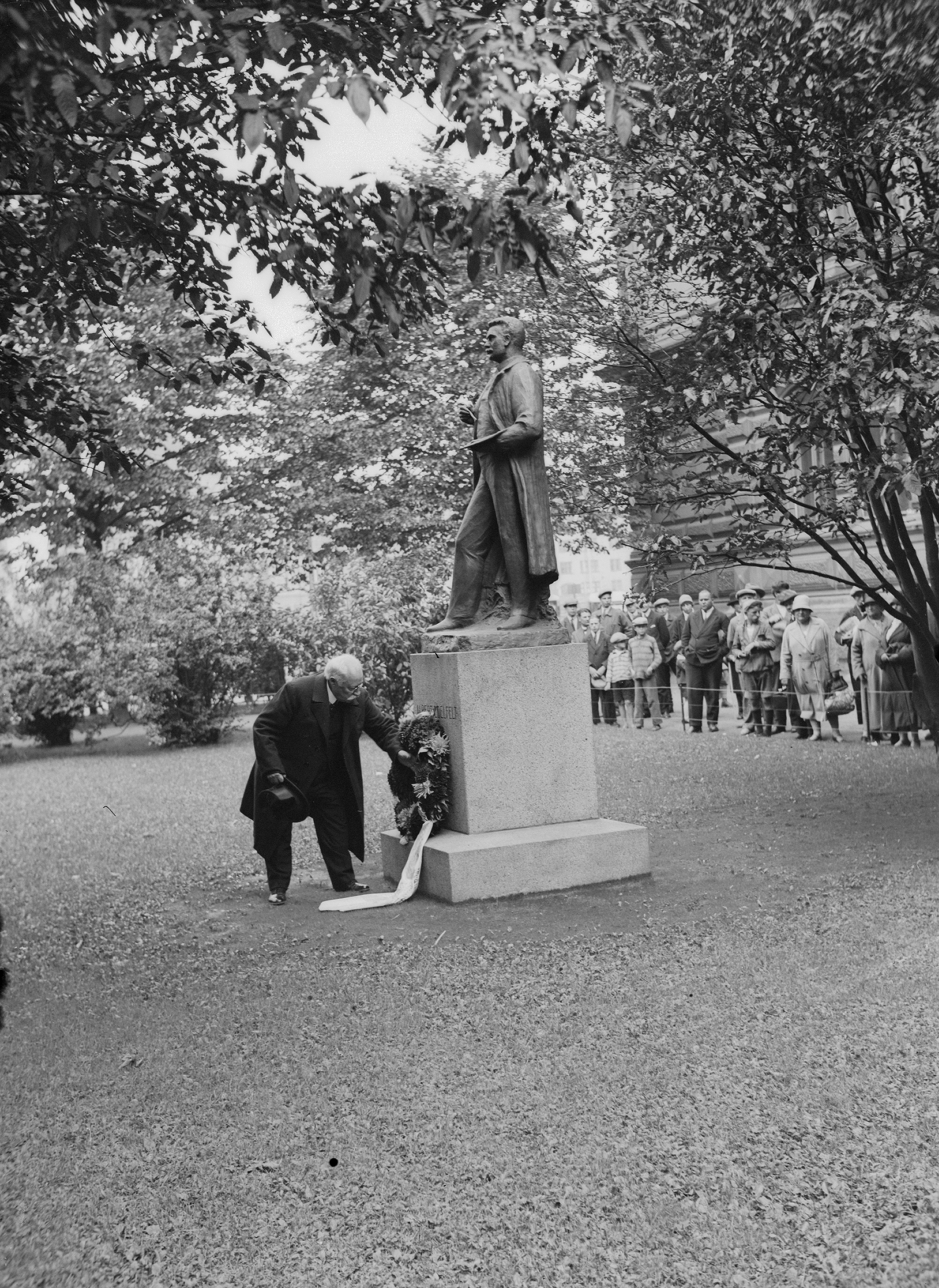
Sculptor Ville Vallgren setting a wreath by his statue of Edelfelt in 1930

He died abruptly from heart failure in 1905 at the age of fifty-one. His funeral was attended by a large number of notable Finns. His son Erik died not long afterwards in 1910.

In 2013, Boys Playing on the Shore (1884) was selected by Nordic Moneta as Finland's most significant painting.

In Finland, he was one of the founders of the Realist art movement. He influenced several younger Finnish painters and helped fellow Finnish artists such as Akseli Gallen-Kallela and Gunnar Berndtson to make their breakthrough in Paris. Among his students was Léon Bakst. Edelfelt was one of the first Finnish artists to achieve international fame. Albert Edelfelt is considered one of the most notable artists of the Golden Age of Finnish Art. A museum under his name operates in Porvoo. He was selected as the main motif on a Finnish commemorative coin celebrating the 150th anniversary of his birth, the €100 Albert Edelfelt and painting commemorative coin, minted in 2004. The reverse shows an embossed face of the artist.

== See also ==
- Golden Age of Finnish Art
- Art in Finland

== Bibliography ==
- Pommereau, Claude (Chief Editor), "Albert Edelfelt – Lumières de Finlande" (in French), February 2022, BeauxArts & Cie Editions. ISBN 979-1-02040-725-2.
- Pennonen, Anne-Maria & Hanne Selkokari (Chief Editors), "Albert Edelfelt", 2023, Finnish National Gallery/Ateneum Art Museum, Helsinki. ISBN 978-952-7371-54-1.
