= Pasteur's portrait by Edelfelt =

Painting by Albert Edelfelt

M. Louis Pasteur in his Laboratory
- Portrait of Louis Pasteur, Pasteur's portrait by Edelfelt
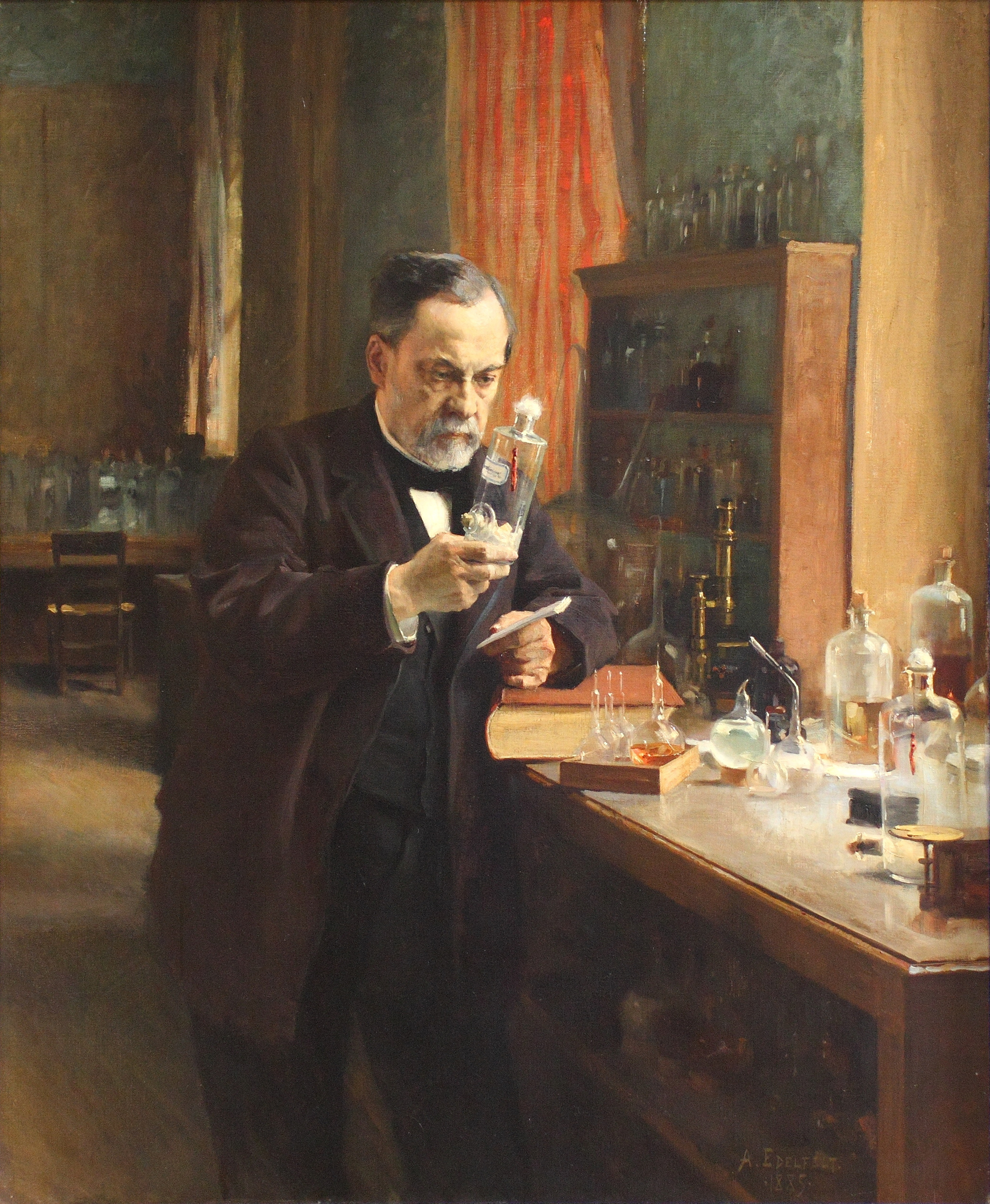
- Artist: Albert Edelfelt
- Year: 1885
- Subject: Louis Pasteur
- Dimensions: 158 cm × 130 cm (62 in × 51 in)
- Location: Musée d'Orsay, Paris

M. Louis Pasteur in his Laboratory, commonly known as Portrait of Louis Pasteur or Pasteur's portrait by Edelfelt, is the best-known portrait of the French chemist Louis Pasteur. Painted by Albert Edelfelt (1854–1905) in 1885, the painting shows Pasteur in his laboratory at the rue d'Ulm, surrounded by his experimental apparatus, the innovative laboratory glassware used in the experimental methods, developed by him on the field of bacteriology in the late 19th century. Pasteur is regarded as one of the main founders of bacteriology, and he is popularly known as the "father of microbiology".

== Painter ==
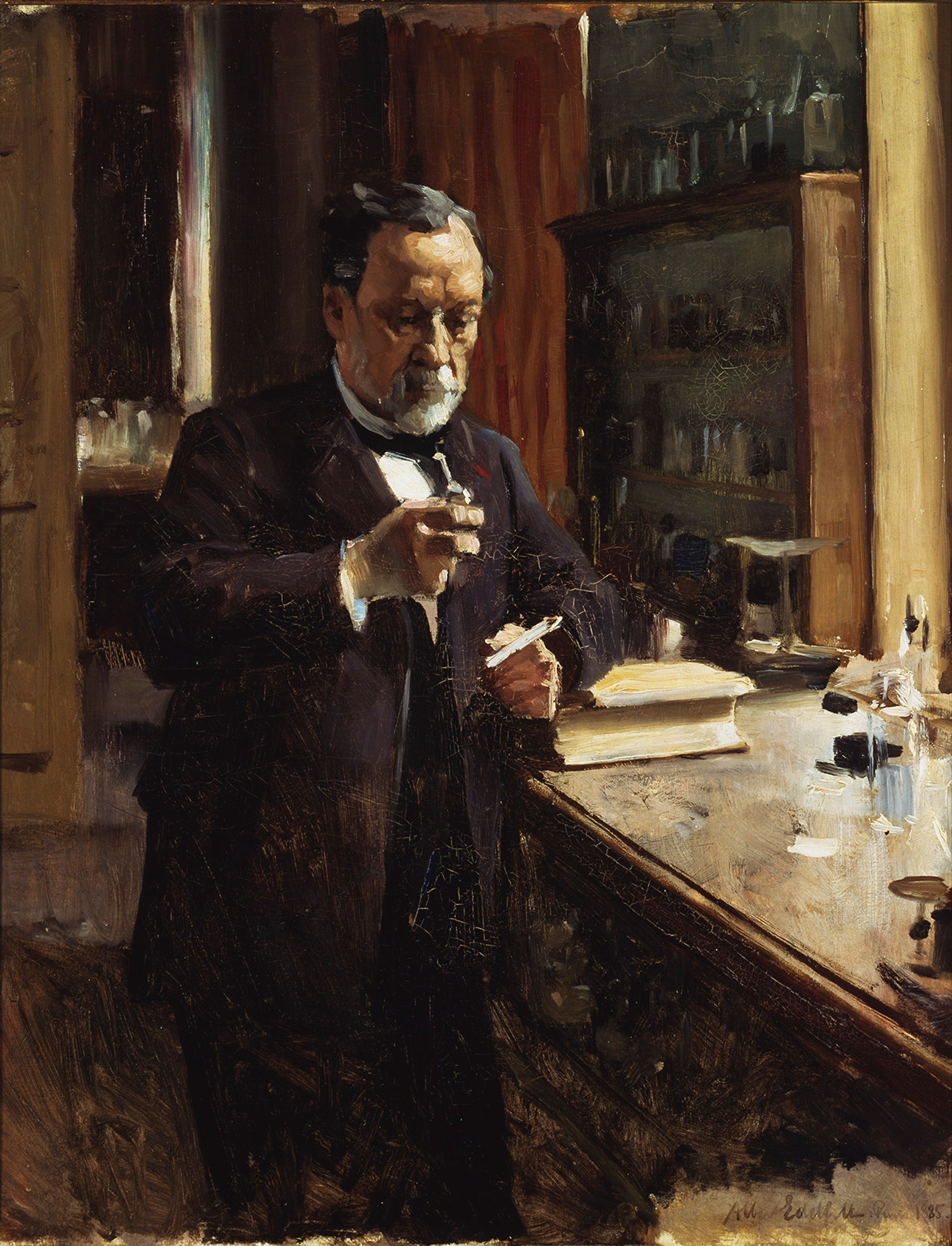
Study by Edelfelt for his portrait of Louis Pasteur

Albert Edelfelt was a Finland-Swedish painter, who lived in Paris. Edelfelt was one of the first Finnish artists to achieve international fame. He enjoyed considerable success in Paris and was one of the founders of the Realist art movement in Finland. He influenced several younger Finnish painters and helped fellow Finnish artists such as Akseli Gallen-Kallela and Gunnar Berndtson to make their breakthrough in Paris. One of his best-known portraits is the painting made of Louis Pasteur depicting the scientist in his laboratory. This portrait of Louis Pasteur, by Albert Edelfelt, is a classic depiction of the pure scientist; the painting was emulated in print as well, and it adorns the cover of the first critical biography of the great chemist. Within his lifetime, Pasteur became an heroic figure in French culture.

The painting depicts the scientist standing among his laboratory equipment, with a thoughtful face, and its theme indicates a contemporary subject, even if the light falling from the right is reminiscent of chiaroscuro. The painting of Louis Pasteur won him the Legion of Honour in 1886 at the exhibition at the Paris Salon. Pasteur kept this portrait by Edelfelt in his dining room.

== Background ==
Louis Pasteur (1822–1895) was a French chemist and microbiologist renowned for his discoveries of the principles of vaccination, microbial fermentation and pasteurization. He is remembered for his remarkable breakthroughs in the causes and prevention of diseases, and his discoveries have saved countless lives ever since.

Innovative laboratory glassware and experimental methods were developed by Louis Pasteur, among others, and contributed to the developing field of bacteriology in the late 19th century. In the 1880s, bacteriology was becoming a coherent discipline, especially through methods for growing pure cultures on agar gels containing specific nutrients in Petri dishes. The long-held idea that living organisms could easily originate from nonliving matter, called spontaneous generation, was attacked in a series of experiments carried out by Pasteur. In the portrait, Pasteur is shown holding a glass bottle containing the spinal cord of a rabbit infected with rabies. This was suggested to the artist by Pasteur himself, who was at the time working on a rabies vaccine.
