= Luxembourg Gardens, Paris =

Painting by Albert Edelfelt

- Pariisin Luxembourgin puistossa (Finnish), I Luxembourgträdgården (Swedish)
- Artist: Albert Edelfelt
- Year: 1887
- Medium: oil on canvas
- Dimensions: 141.5 cm × 186 cm (55.7 in × 73 in)
- Location: Ateneum, Helsinki

Luxembourg Gardens, Paris is an oil painting completed in 1887 by the Finnish artist Albert Edelfelt depicting a scene in the Jardin du Luxembourg in Paris, France. The painting has become a kind of symbol of Edelfelt and the whole of Finnish art, at a time when Paris was the center of the art world. It is one of Edelfelt's larger paintings and a major en plein air painting.

== Description ==
The painting depicts women and children playing on the Luxembourg Gardens’ sandy ground. The children's nurses are identified by their long robe and ruched long-tape hat. To the left a mother in a gray suit is shown. Women are sitting on chairs and relaxing on a sunny summer day. In the foreground a girl holds a wooden hoop. In the middle a girl and the only boy are playing, and in the distance is horse-pinion play. The painting aims to represent the daily life of wealthy Parisian families and the lives of children at the end of the 19th century in Paris.

== Analysis ==
According to Timo Huusko, in Luxembourg Gardens, Paris Edelfelt seems "anemic" but shows the color of joy in the midst of the influx of impressionistic paintings, even though he was about to receive rave reviews. Contrary to his habits, Edelfelt tried to depict a fleeting moment in painting, which is characteristic of Impressionism. Edelfelt paid particular attention to the effect of sunlight and made many sketches on the spot. However, he finished the work largely in Haikko. Despite the transitory nature of Impressionist painting, the clothing fabrics and materials are described distinctly. In the shadow of the foreground figures are painted very closely.

Edelfelt was at this time already fairly well known by the Paris art world having lived there for ten years. Among his works, there are no other large Paris-themed works. The reason is probably that in Paris, he was able to stand out from the competition with piquant and exotic Finnish topics.

== Provenance ==
Luxembourg Gardens was exhibited for the first time at the Galerie Petit's exhibition in May 1887. It then remained in Paris, in the collection of Viktor Antell. Today, the painting belongs to the Ateneum Art Museum, Antell Collection, where it was recorded in 1908. Viktor Antell bequeathed with the rest of the painting collection of the State of Finland, which it ended up in the collections of the Ateneum.

== Documentary film ==
The painting has been made into a film in 1987, directed by Tapani Lundgren and Marjatta Levanto and Levanto Yrjänä. Itw as a 14-minute-long documentary Luxembourg Gardens. The film is based on Edelfelt's letters, and it tells the origin of the painting. In his letters Edelfelt describes the despair when the painting does not progress and satisfaction when one detail was successful. The painting was a work in progress one and a half years.
