= Self-portrait (disambiguation) =

A self-portrait is a picture made by the person that it depicts.

Self Portrait or Self-Portrait may also refer to:

== Visual arts ==
- Self-Portrait (Beccafumi)
- Self-Portrait (Giovanni Bellini)
- Self-Portrait (Paul Bril)
- Self-portrait (Chassériau)
- Self-portrait (David)
- Self-Portrait (Dou, New York)
- Self-Portrait (Dürer, Madrid)
- Self-Portrait (Dürer, Munich)
- Self-portrait (Thomas Eakins)
- Self-Portrait (Frick, Rembrandt)
- Self-Portrait (Artemisia Gentileschi)
- Self-portrait (Giorgione)
- Self-Portrait (El Greco)
- Self-portrait (Hans Holbein the Younger)
- Self-Portrait (Jordaens)
- Self-Portrait (Kneller)
- Self Portrait (Kramskoi)
- Self-Portrait (Lampi)
- Self-portrait by Judith Leyster
- Self-portrait (Raphael)
- Self-Portrait (Rembrandt, Altman)
- Self-Portrait (Rembrandt, Florence)
- Self-portrait (Rembrandt, Indianapolis)
- Self-Portrait (Rembrandt, Wallace Collection, London)
- Self-Portrait (Rembrandt, Louvre)
- Self-Portrait (Rembrandt, Vienna)
- Self-Portrait (Rubens, Antwerp)
- Self-Portrait (Rubens, London)
- Self-portrait (Tartaglia)
- Self-Portrait (Ellen Thesleff)
- Self Portrait (Tintoretto)
- Self-Portrait (Titian, Berlin)
- Self-Portrait (Titian, Madrid)
- Self-portrait (van Dyck, 1613-14)
- Self-portrait (van Dyck, 1640)
- Self-Portrait (van Hemessen)
- Self-Portrait (Simon Vouet)

== Music ==
- Self Portrait (Ruth Copeland album) (1970)
- Self Portrait (Bob Dylan album) (1970)
- Self Portrait (Lalah Hathaway album) (2008)
- Self Portrait (Hitomi album) (2002)
- Self-Portrait (Jay-Jay Johanson album) (2008)
- Self Portrait (Raymond Lam album) (2012)
- Self Portrait (Junko Onishi album) (1998)
- Self Portrait (Loma Prieta album) (2015)
- "Self Portrait", a 1975 song by Rainbow from Ritchie Blackmore's Rainbow
- Self-Portrait (EP) (Suho, 2020)

== Other uses ==
- Self-Portrait (1969 film), a film by Yoko Ono
- Self-Portrait (2022 film), a Canadian documentary film
- Self Portrait, an autobiography by Che Guevara
- Self-Portrait (book), a 2019 book by Celia Paul

== See also ==
- Selfie
