= Omakuva =

Omakuva (Finnish for "self-portrait") may refer to:

== Visual arts ==
- Omakuva, a 1926 painting by Väinö Kunnas
- Self-Portrait (Lampi), a 1933 painting
- Self-Portrait, a 1914 painting by Tyko Sallinen
- Self-Portrait (Ellen Thesleff), an 1890s drawing

== Other ==
- Omakuva, a 1998 album by Jaakko Löytty
- Omakuva, a 1989 book by Einojuhani Rautavaara

== See also ==
- Related media at Wikimedia Commons:

Omakuva (men)
Omakuva (women)
