= Self-Portrait at the Age of 63 =

1669 painting by Rembrandt

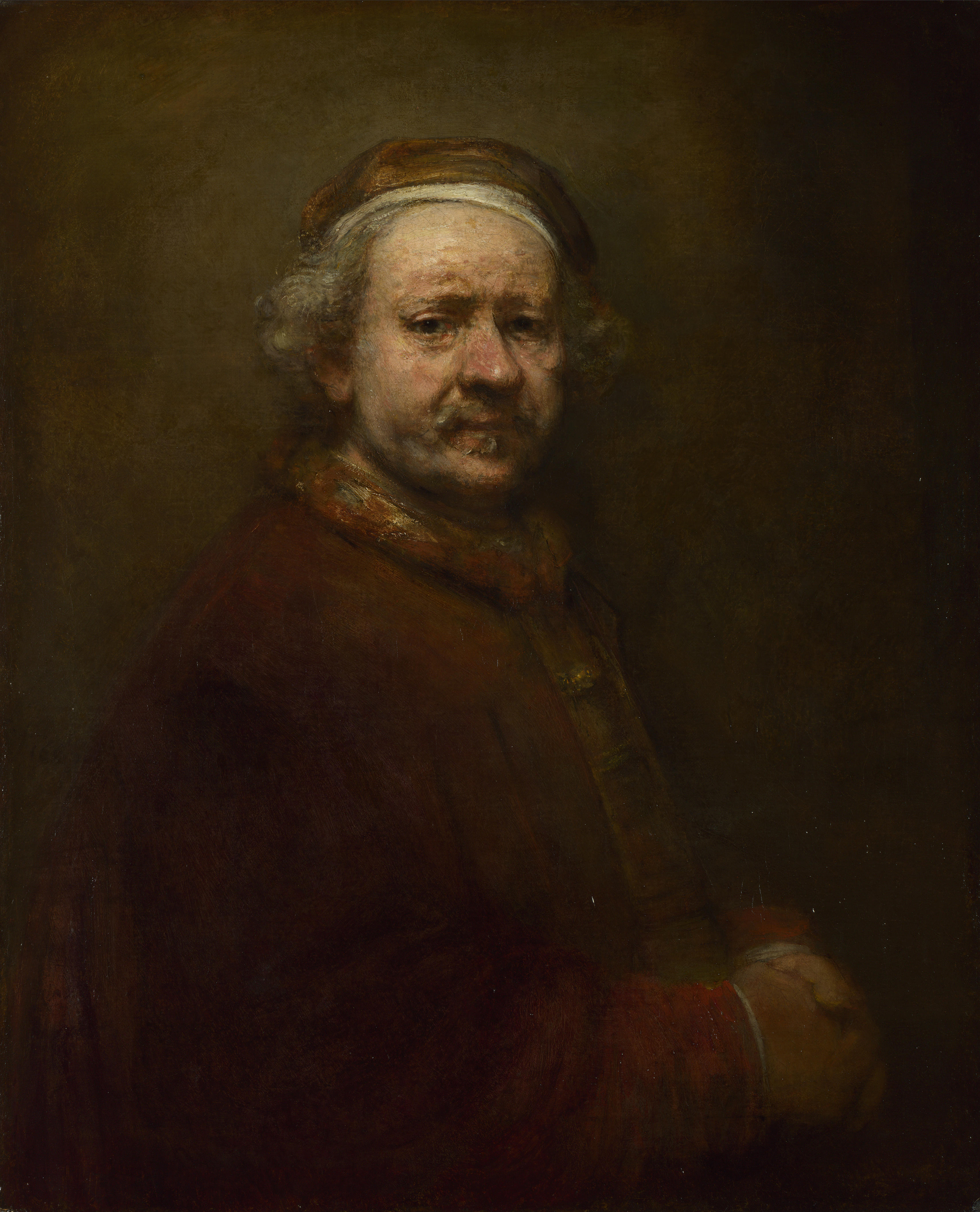
- Artist: Rembrandt
- Year: 1669
- Medium: Oil on canvas
- Dimensions: 86 cm × 70.5 cm (34 in × 27.8 in)
- Location: National Gallery; London
- Accession: NG221

Self-Portrait at the Age of 63 is a self-portrait by the Dutch artist Rembrandt. One of three dating to 1669, it was one of the last in his series of around 80 self-portraits, painted in the months before his death in October 1669. Despite the closeness of his death, and the concentration on his aging face, Rembrandt makes an impression of a self-assured and confident artist. It was bought by the National Gallery, London in 1851.

The work measures 86 cm × 70.5 cm (33.9 in × 27.8 in). Rembrandt depicts himself in deep red coat with fur collar and beret, looking out at the viewer with his hands clasped. A damaged signature and date were revealed when the painting was cleaned in 1967, and it is believed that the work has been cut down on all four sides. X-ray analysis has shown two pentimenti (changes to the composition by the artist): the beret was originally larger and white in colour, and the hands originally had a different position, holding a paintbrush and maulstick. His sagging blemished face is carefully rendered with many layers of translucent paint, but his robe and the background remains shadowy and the hands are indistinct.

The painting was investigated by the scientists of the National Gallery in London. Rembrandt employed his usual rather limited palette of lead white, ochres and red lakes.

It was in the collection of William van Huls until sold at auction in London in 1722, and bought for £80 by Thomas Brodrick. It was inherited by his nephew Alan Brodrick, 2nd Viscount Midleton, and remained at Peper Harow until auctioned by George Brodrick, 5th Viscount Midleton, in 1851, when it was bought for £430 10s by the National Gallery.

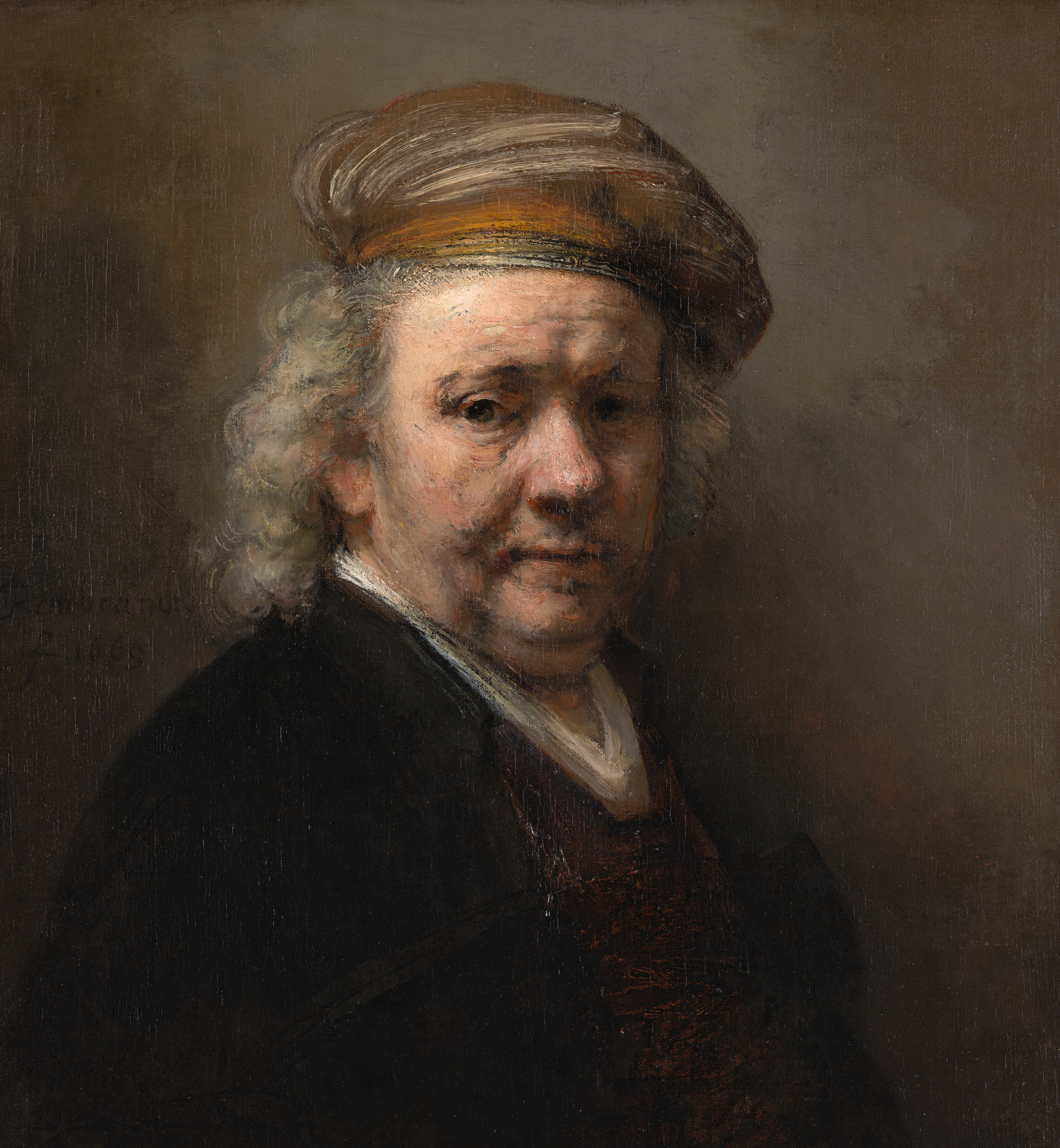
A similar self-portrait from 1669 in the Mauritshuis

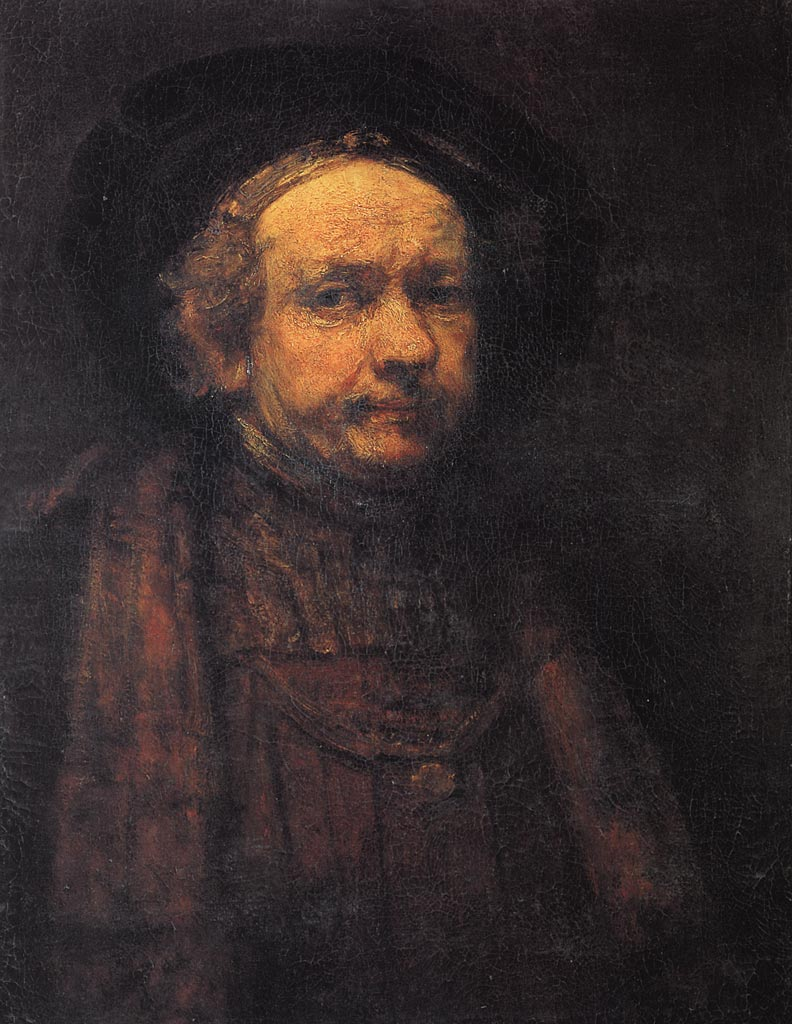
Another self-portrait of 1669, in Florence

== See also ==
- List of paintings by Rembrandt
