= Philip French =

English film critic and radio producer (1933–2015)

Philip French OBE
- French in 2013
- Born: Philip Neville French; 28 August 1933; Birkenhead, England
- Died: 27 October 2015 (aged 82); London, England
- Education: Bristol Grammar School; Exeter College, Oxford; Indiana University Bloomington
- Occupations: Film critic, radio producer
- Years active: 1957–2015
- Spouse: Kersti Molin
- Children: 3

Philip Neville French (28 August 1933 – 27 October 2015) was an English film critic and radio producer. French began his career in journalism in the late 1950s, before eventually becoming a BBC Radio producer, and later a film critic. He began writing for The Observer in 1963 and retired as film critic in 2013, but continued to write until his death.

French was appointed Officer of the Order of the British Empire (OBE) in December 2012. Upon his death on 27 October 2015, French was referred to by his Observer successor Mark Kermode as "an inspiration to an entire generation of film critics".

== Biography ==
French was born in Birkenhead, Cheshire, England in 1933. The son of an insurance salesman, he moved frequently throughout his childhood, and was educated at the direct grant Bristol Grammar School then at Exeter College, Oxford, where he read Law. He undertook post-graduate study in journalism at Indiana University Bloomington, on a scholarship.

French entered journalism as a reporter at the Bristol Evening Post in 1957. He was theatre critic of the New Statesman between 1967 and 1968 and deputy film critic to David Robinson at The Times for some years. French was the film critic of The Observer from 1978, but had begun writing for the paper in 1963. He also wrote for Sight and Sound. French's books include The Movie Moguls: An Informal History of the Hollywood Tycoons (1969) and Westerns, which reappeared in a revised version in 2005. He also wrote the book Cult Movies (1999) together with Karl French, one of his sons.

Between 1959 and 1990, when he took early retirement, French was a BBC Radio producer. At first he was a producer on the North American service, but the bulk of his BBC career was for domestic radio. He was a BBC talks producer (1961–67) and then a senior producer for the corporation from 1968. In the 1960s he produced The Critics on the BBC Home Service and from 1974 to 1990 he produced its successor programme Critics' Forum on BBC Radio 3. His appointment as film critic of The Observer was opposed by the then Controller of Radio 3, Stephen Hearst, who felt that it would be impossible for French to be an impartial producer while also working as a regular film critic, but he was over-ruled by his superior, Howard Newby.

French was named the British Press Awards Critic of the Year in 2009. He was appointed Officer of the Order of the British Empire (OBE) in the 2013 New Year Honours for services to film. French was known for his exceptional memory. Michael Billington, The Guardian's theatre critic, was appointed an OBE at the same time as French. Billington recalled: "I ended a congratulatory telephone call with the jokey line, 'See you at the palace.' Quick as a flash, he replied, 'As Dirk Bogarde said to Bill Kerr in Appointment in London in 1953'."

At the beginning of May 2013 it was announced that French would retire as film critic for The Observer in August to coincide with his 80th birthday. However, he started a column reviewing older films on home video and continued it until the end of his life, writing about a Blu-ray release of The Ladykillers (1955) in a review published two days before his death.

French was an Honorary Associate of London Film School.

== Style ==
French had a fondness for puns. In an essay on British cinema and the Post Office he began: "I don't know much about philately, but I know what I lick." He was one of the few who saw and wrote humorously about the lost 1969 Yoko Ono film Self-Portrait that exclusively featured the penis of John Lennon. French was also fond of recalling the B-movie actor who, having exchanged life in Hollywood for a typewriter, called his memoir Forgive Us Our Press Passes. It was suggested, in his obituary in The Daily Telegraph, that this fondness arose from his own experience of having a stammer.

== Personal life ==
French and his Swedish-born wife Kersti Molin had three sons. Their oldest son, Sean French, is one half of the Nicci French writing team, and another son, Patrick French, is a doctor. His youngest son, Karl, is an editor and author. French had 10 grandchildren. He lived in Dartmouth Park.

Prompted by the release of the film, The King's Speech, French wrote about his own stammer.

In 2004, French named The Line of Beauty by Alan Hollinghurst as one of his books of the year, in part due to the fact that the protagonist of the novel is a keen reader of French's film reviews.

== Death ==
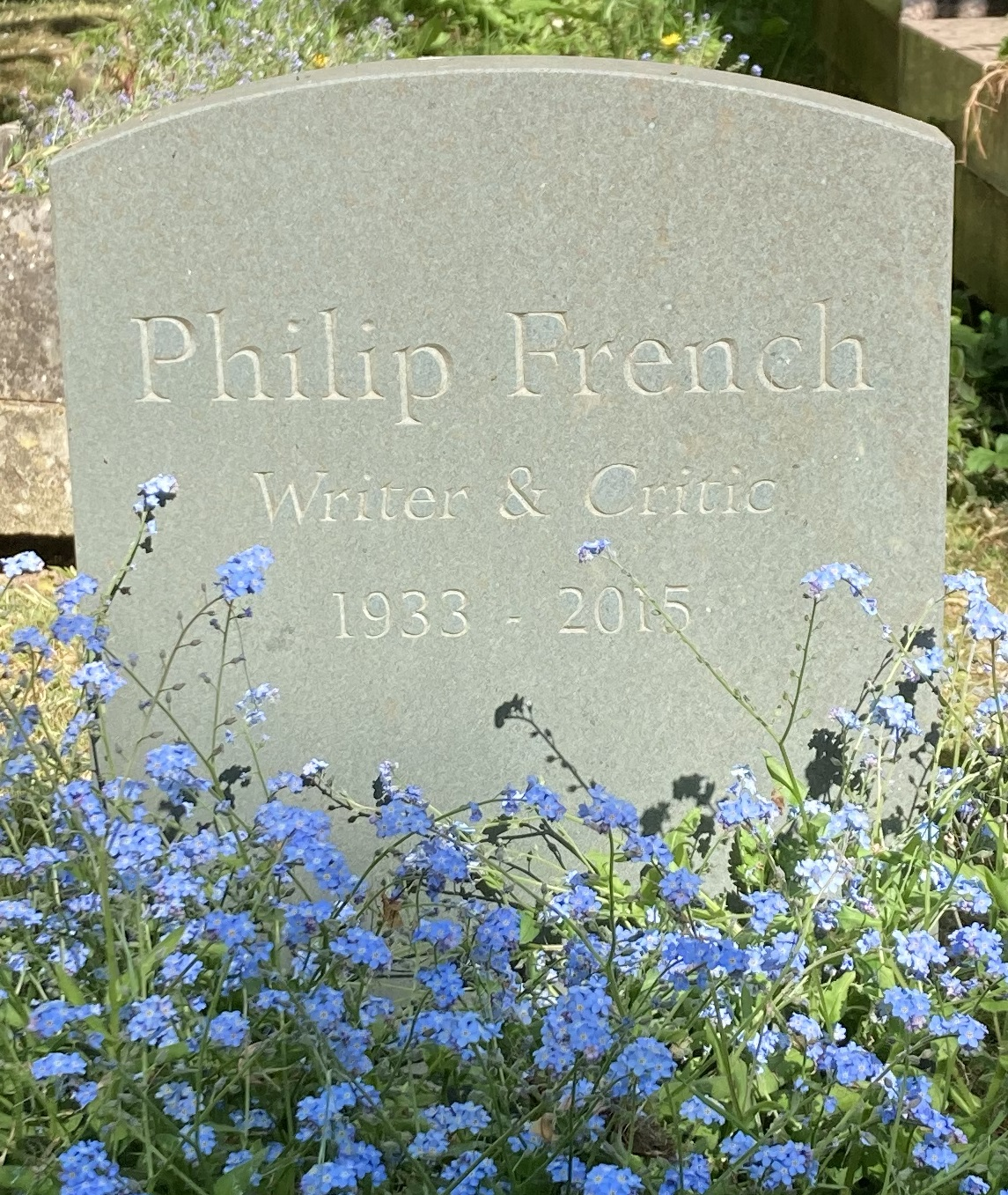
Grave of Philip French in Highgate Cemetery

After years of ill health, French died at his home from a heart attack on 27 October 2015, aged 82, and his ashes were buried on the eastern side of Highgate Cemetery.

Upon his death on 27 October 2015, French was referred to by his Observer successor Mark Kermode as "an inspiration to an entire generation of film critics". The Observer editor John Mulholland said that French was "a giant figure" in the paper's history and "part of its soul for the past 50 years", adding:

He was a brilliant critic whose erudition and judgement were respected by generations of cinema lovers and film-makers alike. He was also a joy to work with, unfailingly warm and generous to colleagues and to the thousands of readers he encountered. He is revered as one of the most astute critics of his generation, whose love of film shone through his lucid and engaging writing. He will be missed sorely, but he will be remembered with affection and respect by his legion of admirers.

French's son Sean said, "If readers felt they knew him it's because he put his personality into the writing. He was a very funny man, with a slightly grim comic view of the world and this obsessive thing about puns." The Daily Telegraph said that French was "the doyen of English film critics" and estimated that he had seen some 14,000 films, many of them during the 50 years that he wrote for The Observer.

== Works ==
- 1969, Movie Moguls. An Informal History of the Hollywood Tycoons, Weidenfeld & Nicolson, ISBN 978-0-297-76266-9
- 1974, Westerns: Aspects of a Movie Genre, Viking Press, ISBN 978-0-670-75727-5
- 1980, Three Honest Men: Edmund Wilson, F.R.Leavis, Lionel Trilling – A Critical Mosaic, (ed.) Carcanet Press, ISBN 978-0-85635-299-7
- 1993, Malle on Malle, (ed.) Faber and Faber
- 1995, "Wild Strawberries" (BFI Film Classics) (with Kersti French), BFI Publishing, ISBN 978-0-85170-481-4
- 1999, Cult Movies, (with Karl French), Pavilion Books, ISBN 978-1-86205-172-0
- 2008, Censoring the Moving Image: Manifestos for the Twenty-first Century, (with Julian Petley), University of Chicago Press, ISBN 978-1-905422-55-5
- 2011, I Found it at the Movies: Reflections of a Cinephile, Carcanet Press, ISBN 978-1-84777-129-2
