= Self-Portrait (Rubens, Antwerp) =

Painting by Peter Paul Rubens

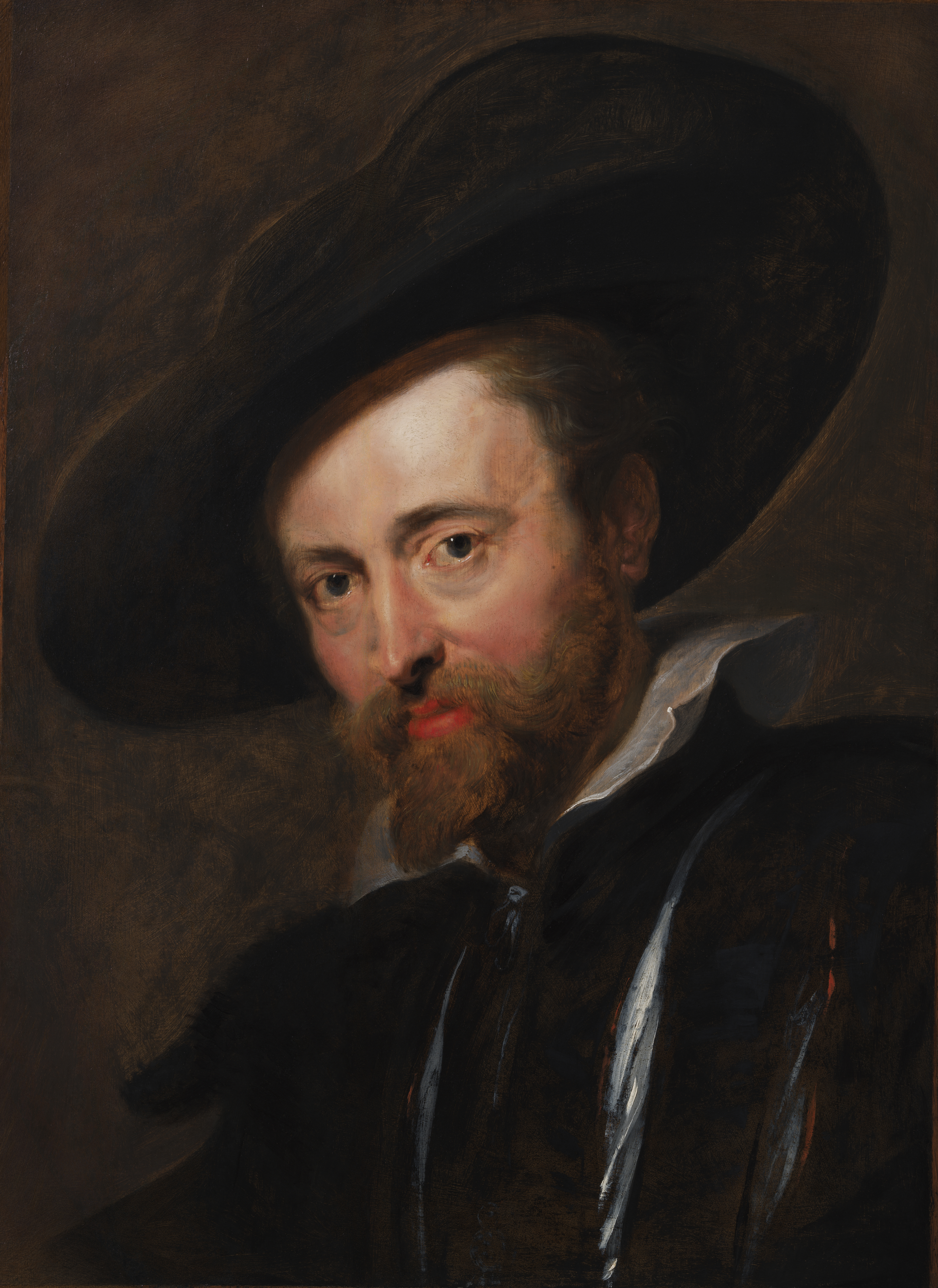
- Scan of the painting after restoration
- Artist: Peter Paul Rubens
- Year: c. 1623 – 1630
- Medium: Oil on panel
- Dimensions: 64.2 cm × 48 cm (25.3 in × 19 in)
- Location: Rubenshuis, Antwerp
- Accession: RH.S.180

Self-Portrait is a self-portrait painting by Peter Paul Rubens, created no later than 1630. It has been on display at the Rubenshuis in Antwerp since 1972.

== History ==
Researchers at the National Gallery confirmed the authenticity of the self-portrait in 2015. As the portrait was first reproduced in print in 1630, it is dated to no later than that year. Rubens also appears younger in the portrait than he would have been at 1630 (53–54 years old), suggesting an earlier origin. The painting was not intended for sale; rather, it was a workshop model used as an example for teaching students on portraiture. It also served as the model for a small etching by Willem Panneels dated 1630 and for the portrait of Rubens that Anthony van Dyck included in his Iconography.

The immediate history of the portrait after it left Rubens' hands is unclear. It first reappears in the historical record in a sales catalogue from 1765 on public sale, ultimately purchased by the Prince of Rubempré. For roughly the next two centuries, the portrait was relocated to several cities around the world, ending up in the hands of Greek billionaire Stavros Niarchos, who put it for auction at Christie's in 1972. When the city government of Antwerp won the auction, the painting was restored and put for display at the Rubenshuis museum—formerly Rubens' home and workshop—where it remains today.

== Analysis ==
Wrapped in a capacious coat, Rubens presents himself in a pose as elegant as it is casual, his facial expression alert and intelligent. Contemporaries would have registered it as an eloquent image, seeing in the bearing and the manner an expression of qualities of intellect and character. Giovanni Paolo Lomazzo, for instance, in his Trattato dell’arte de la pittura (1584), stated that poses in images of virtuosi could depict characteristics such as 'excellence', 'dignity', 'composure' and 'grace'. Elaborate, animated drapery could be used to enhance and vary the pose. Gesture, too, played a part, hands embodying the human capacity for reason and verbal eloquence and signalling a keen intelligence. Vivid facial expressions, generated by emphasizing the eyes and the forehead, were the mark of an active mind. In his version of the Rubens portrait, van Dyck granted it rhetorical pathos by adding a hand-on-heart gesture, an attestation of sincerity popular at the time. This portrait established Rubens’s official view of himself, echoed in Panneels’s etching and in a bust dated 1633.

== Gallery ==
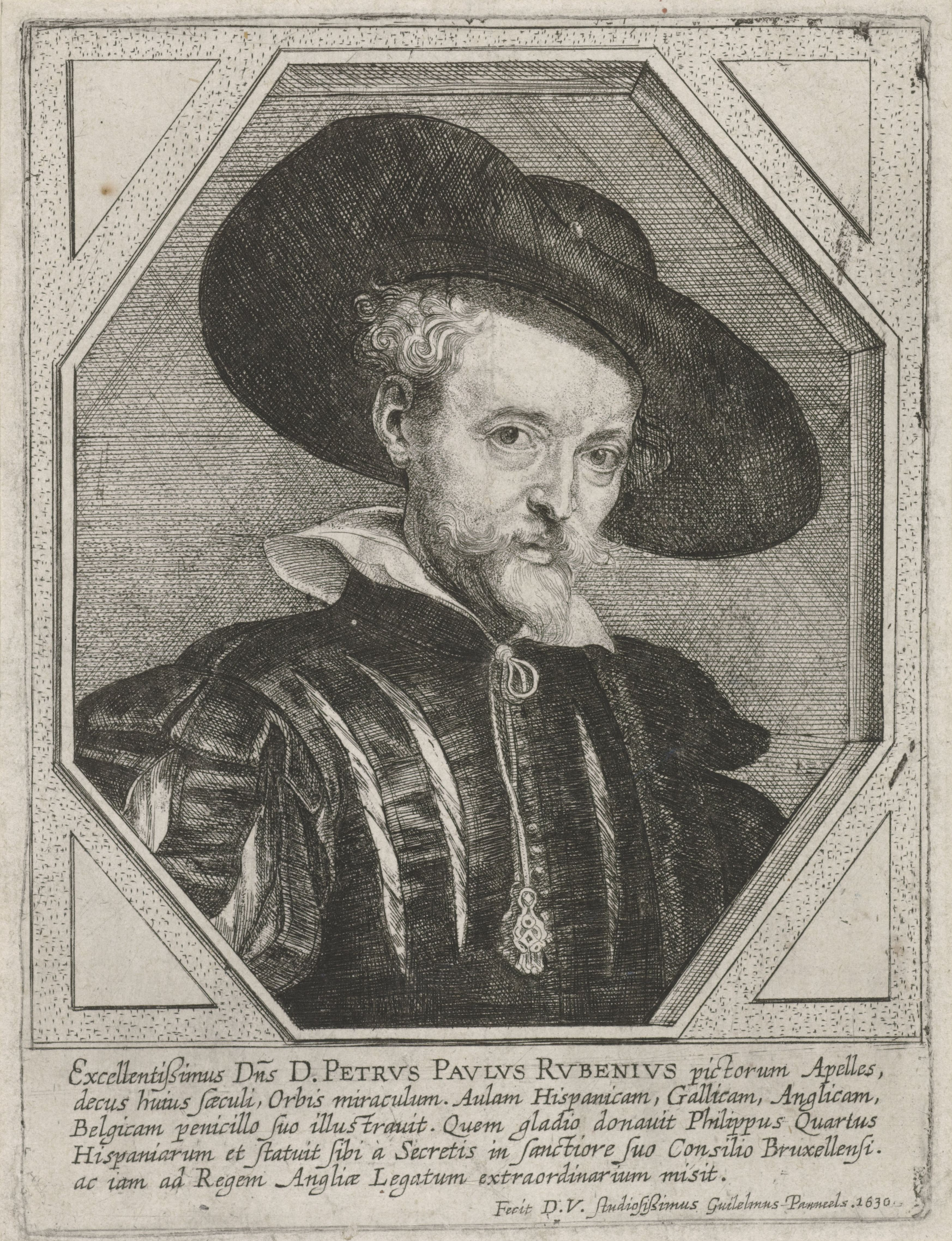
Engraved version by Willem Panneels, 1630

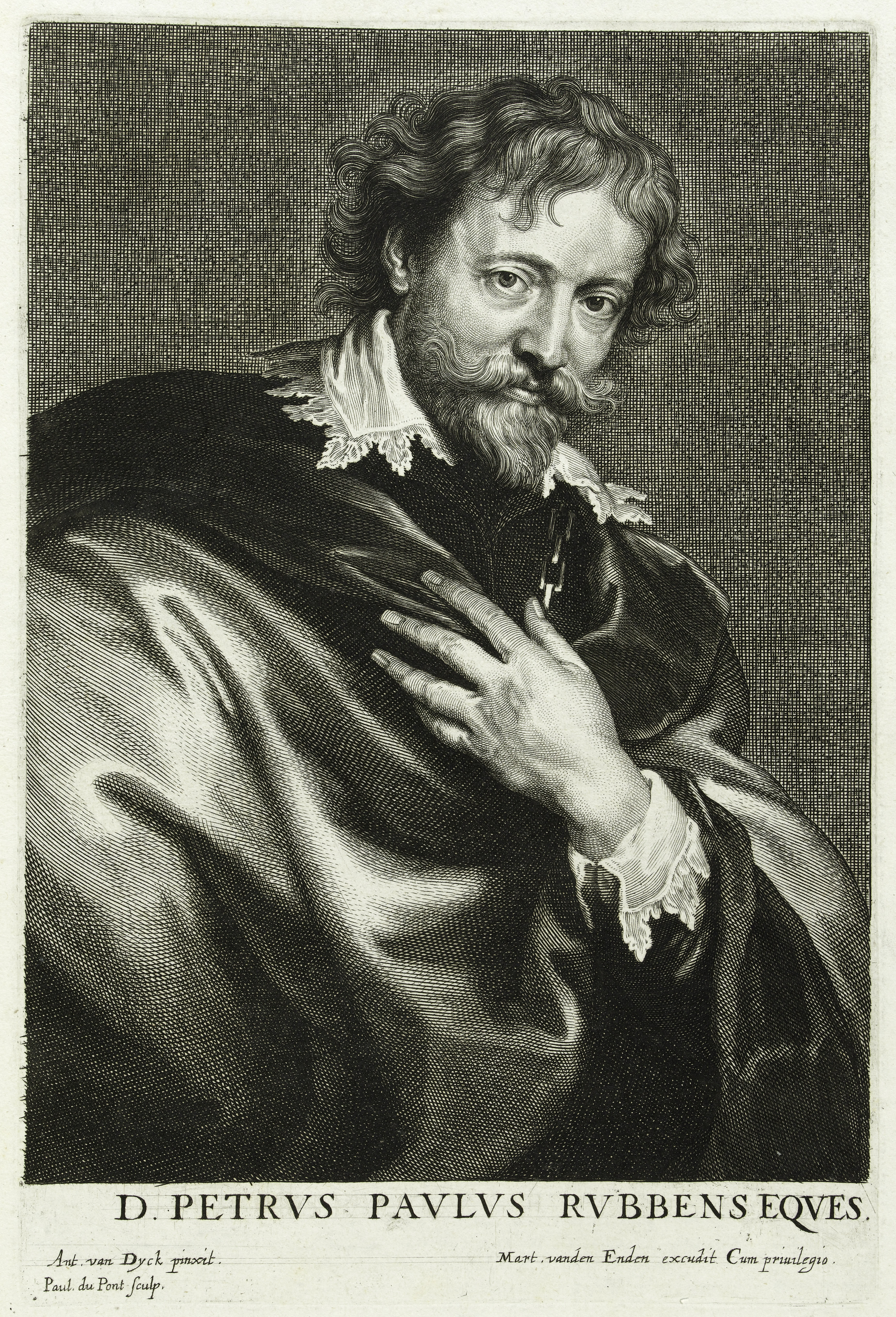
Engraving by Paulus Pontius, after Anthony van Dyck, 1630 – 1636

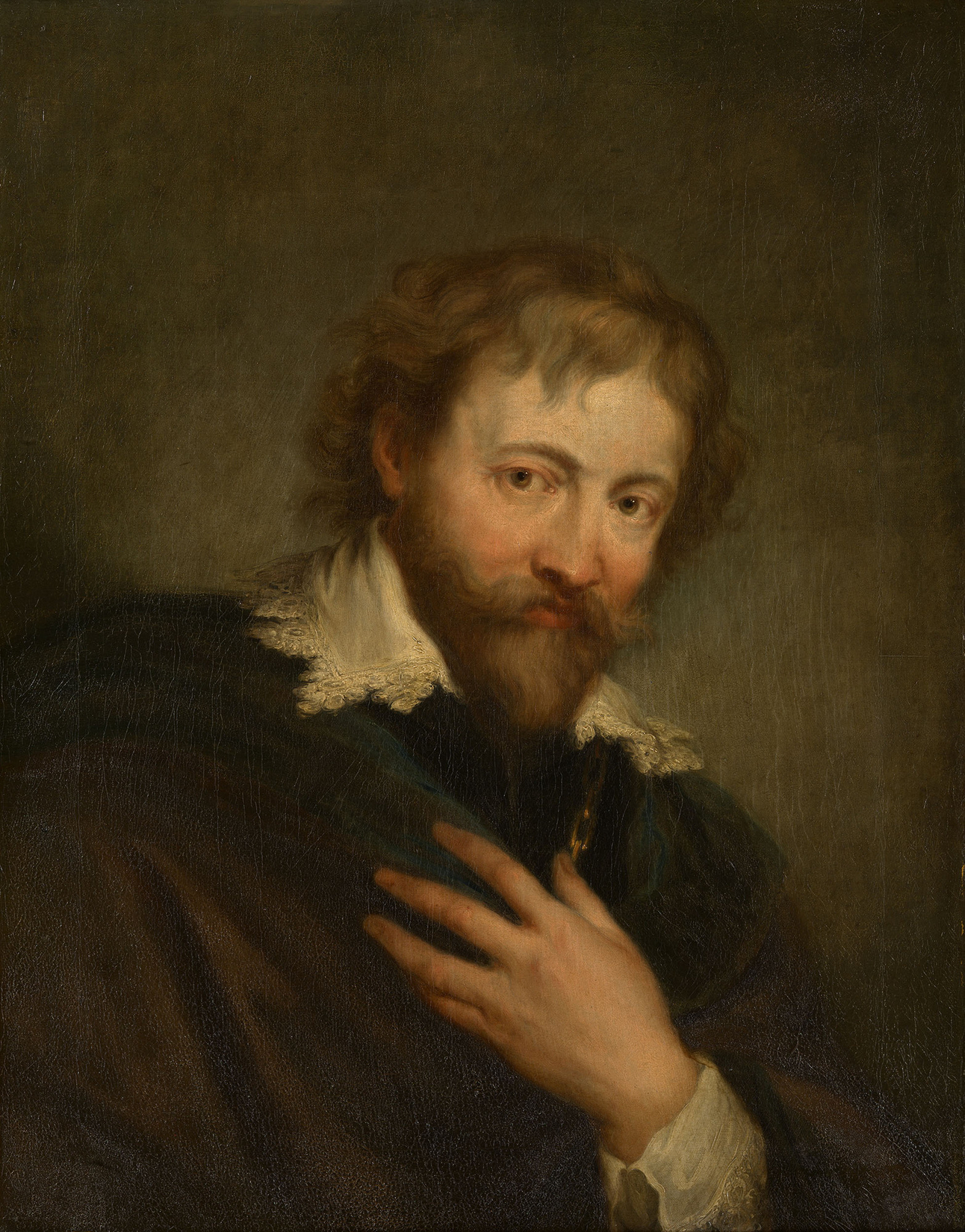
Painting by Giuseppe Nogari, after Pontius, c. 1730 – c. 1750

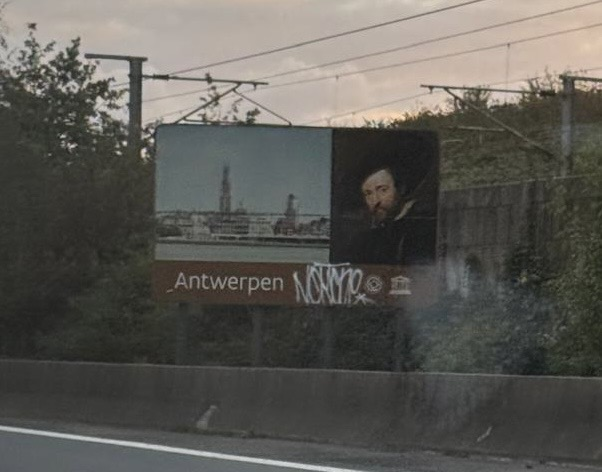
Welcome sign of Antwerp featuring the painting
