= Self-Portrait (Rembrandt, Wallace Collection, London) =

Painting by Rembrandt, c. 1637

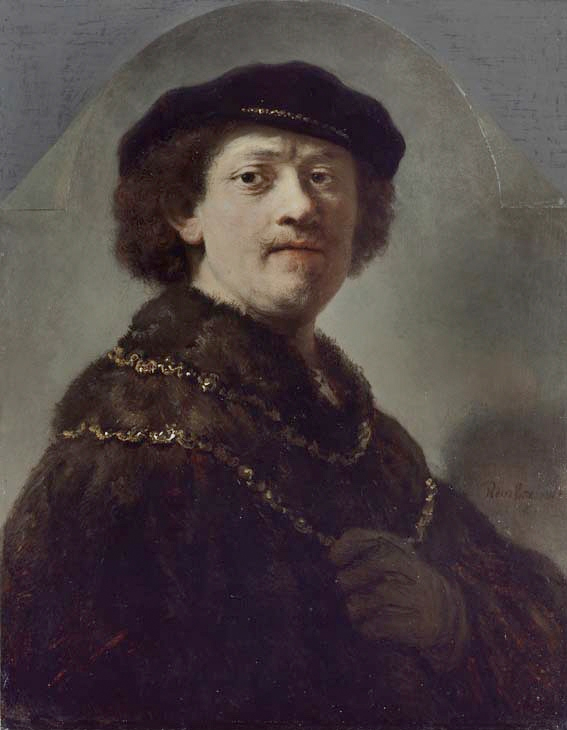
Self-Portrait in a Black Cap, c. 1637

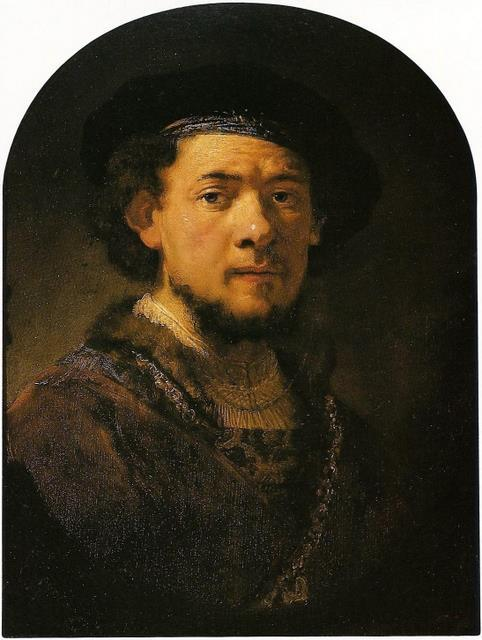
The São Paulo work

Self-Portrait or Self-Portrait in a Black Cap is a c. 1637 self-portrait by Rembrandt or portrait of the artist by his studio. It was bought as a self-portrait in 1848 by Richard Seymour-Conway and is now in the Wallace Collection in London. Until recently it was thought to be a workshop copy, but is now mostly accepted as by Rembrandt himself.

It is related to another portrait of Rembrandt now in the Museu de Arte de São Paulo, which is variously attributed to Rembrandt himself or to Govert Flinck.
