= Willem Panneels =

Flemish engraver

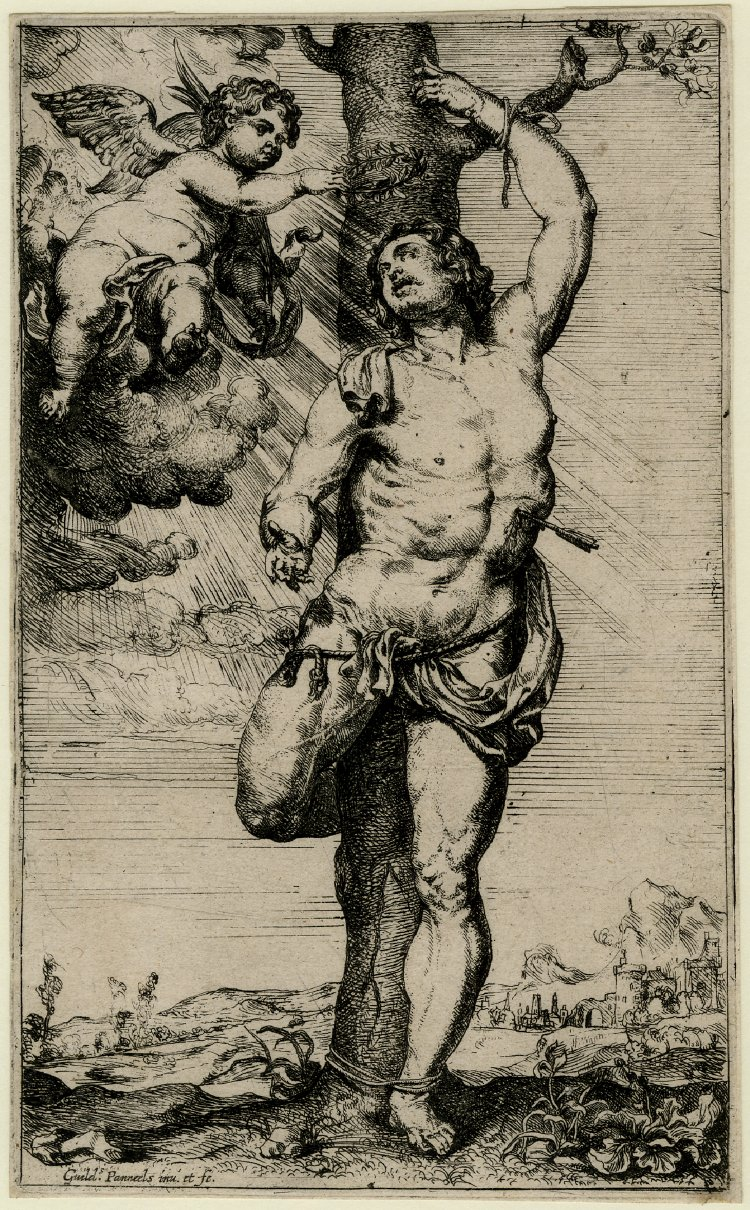
St Sebastian with a putto crowning him with a laurel wreath, Panneels after Rubens, etching, c.1631

Willem Panneels (c. 1600 – c. 1634) was a Flemish engraver who was active in the first half of the 17th century. He is mainly known for the copies he made of drawings from the personal study of Rubens.

== Biography ==
Very little is known about his personal life. He was born around 1600 probably in Antwerp. Until his arrival in Rubens' workshop in 1624–1625, no information about him is known. When he left Rubens’ workshop in 1630, he traveled to Cologne, Baden and Frankfurt am Main. In 1631 he stayed in Mainz, where he worked for the prince-bishop Anselm Casimir Wambold von Umstadt. In 1632 he traveled on to Strasbourg and after that date the historical records are silent about him. It is assumed he died around 1634 in Baden-Baden.

== Panneels and Rubens ==
Willem Panneels began working for Rubens in 1624–1625 as an engraver. In 1628 he was registered with the Antwerp Guild of St. Luke. The register states that he was an assistant of Rubens. The fact that Panneels registered with the Guild is exceptional since Rubens and the members of his workshop were exempted from registration with the Guild because of Rubens' appointment to the court as a court painter. Only two other of Rubens' assistants were registered with the Guild. Panneels' registration with the Guild shows that he had fulfilled the requirements towards becoming a master and that he was ready to start his own workshop. However, he stayed on at Rubens' workshop for another two years.

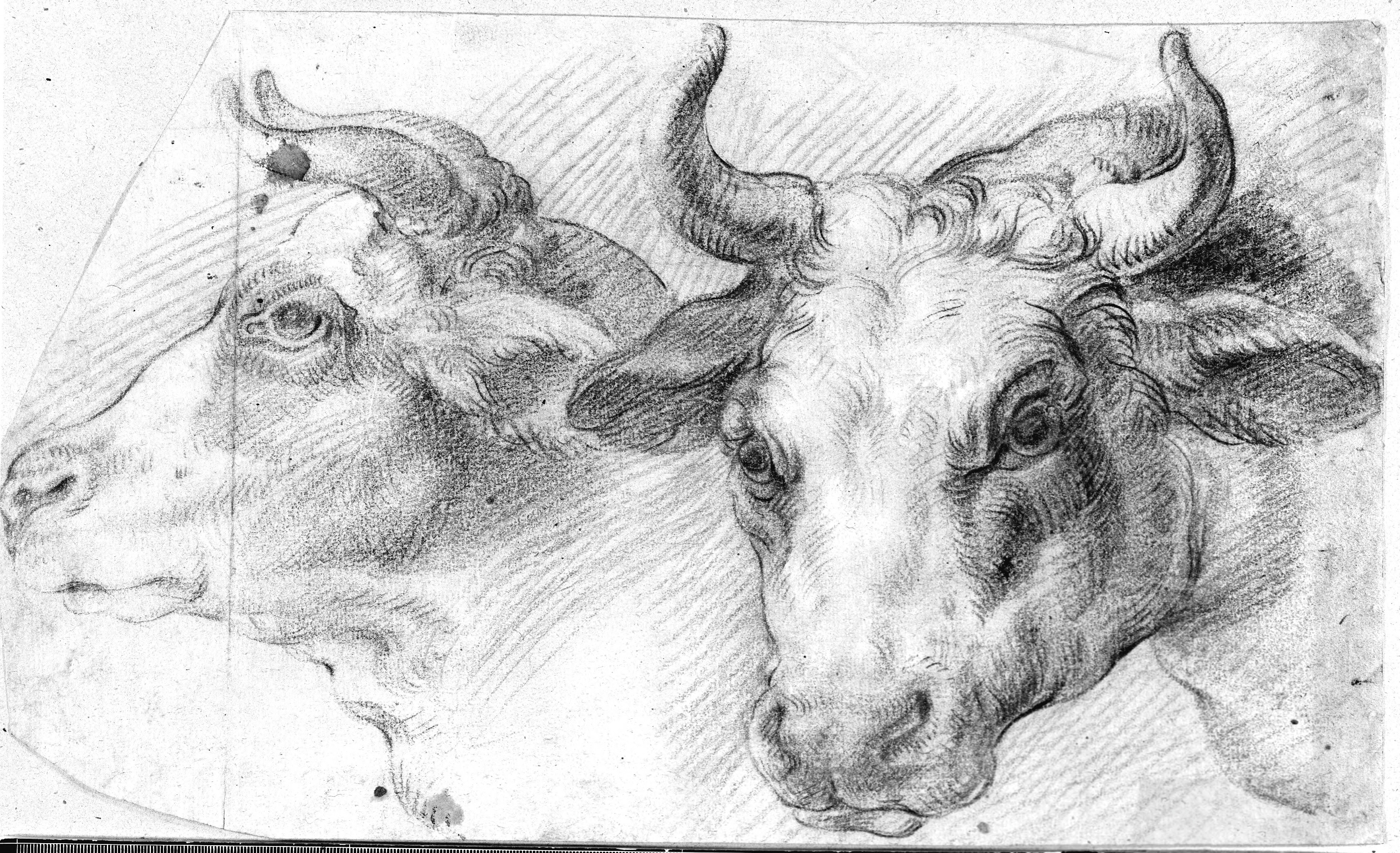
Sketch of a cow's head, Panneels after Rubens, c. 1628–1629

Examples of the prints he made during this period include ‘’David slays the bear’’, ‘’St Sebastian bound to a tree with a putti’’ and ‘’St. Agnes’’. His style is close to that of Rubens. There were sufficient orders for him to complete in Rubens’ workshop. Just like Rubens’ other collaborators, Panneels could draw from an extensive collection of artwork and sketches to practice his skills. This collection was kept in a closet or room (referred to in Flemish as cantoor) that served as a repository for documents and models. The copying of these works belonged to the standard training received in a workshop. The Danish physician Otto Sperling who visited Rubens' workshop in the early 1720s reported on the active copying work that took place in the workshop. The works kept in the cantoor also served as a model for execution of new art works. The cantoor of Rubens was very extensive because of the many assignments he had worked on and his regular travels abroad where he would make sketches of the many new things he encountered there. All these sketches were kept inside the cantoor.

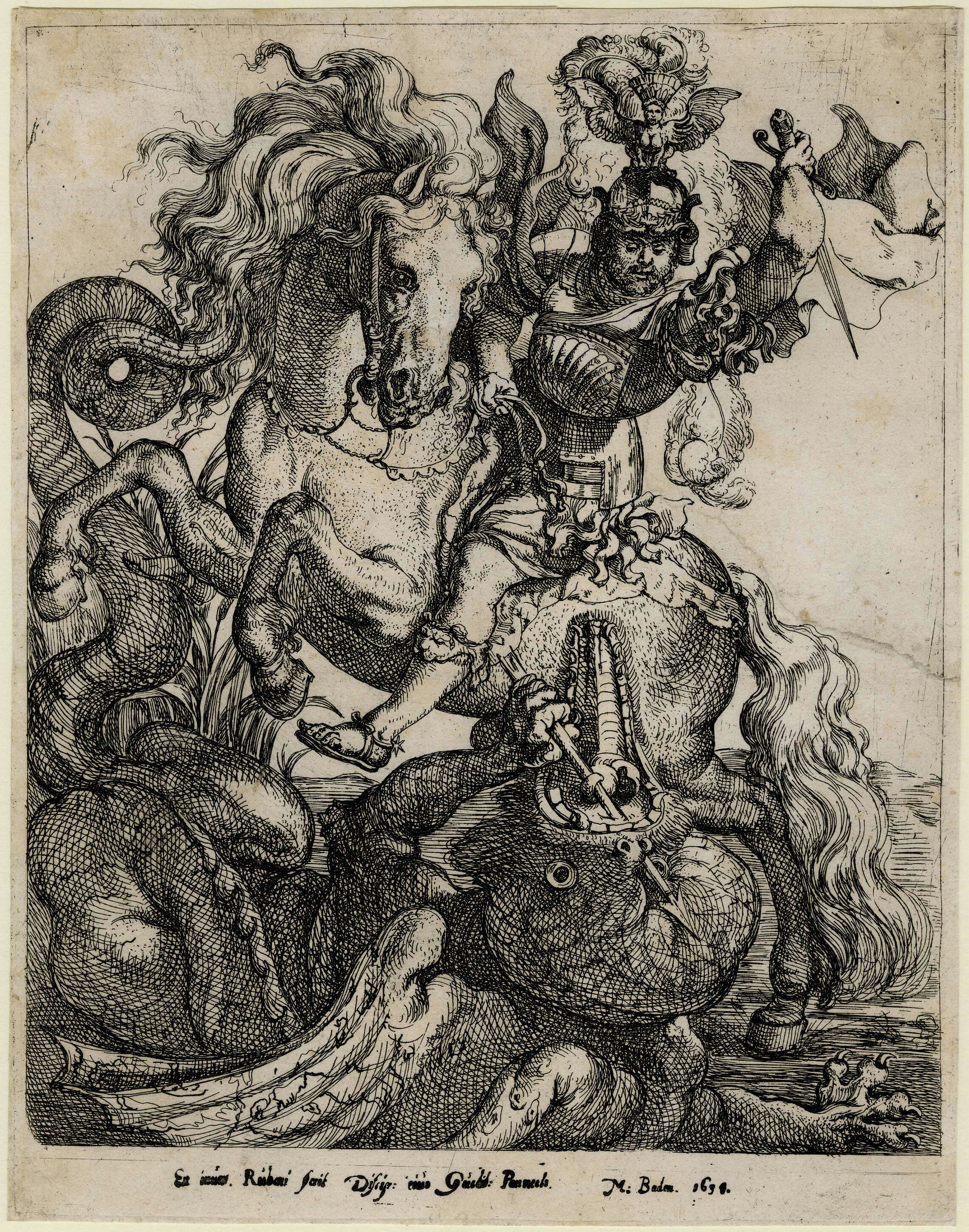
St George slays the dragon, Panneels after the painting by Rubens in the Museo del Prado, etching, c. 1631

In the year 1628 Rubens went on a diplomatic mission. During his absence Panneels looked after Rubens' house and workshop. This gave him access to all the works which Rubens kept in his cantoor. It was not general practice for collaborators to have unrestricted access to the cantoor as it was regarded as important intellectual property of the artist that he would use in his creative process. Rubens had therefore provided in his will that the works in the cantoor should stay in the family should any of his children wish to follow in his artistic footsteps.

Panneels made a large number of copies of the works present in the cantoor and of Rubens' sketch books of anatomy and garments. 262 of the more than 500 works belonging to the Rubens cantoor have been identified as being by the hand of Panneels. Panneels mainly copied parts of works or made loose sketches. Thus he copied anatomical sketches or parts of animals.

The drawings he made were not exact copies and display some differences with the originals. Perhaps this indicates an independent exercise in creativity by Panneels. Shortly after Rubens' return to Antwerp, he decided to move abroad and establish himself as an independent artist. It is therefore possible that he made the copies of Rubens’ cantoor to train his own style and creativity. Panneels put his own signature on the copies thus making clear that they were copies after Rubens and that he did not want to resell them as original Rubens drawings.

The copies that Panneels made of Rubens’ cantoor are an important source of information about Rubens’ creative process.

== Work ==
The etchings of Panneels were often based on paintings or designs of Rubens. His own work is also heavily influenced by the style of Rubens. Only a few engravings are known from the period after he left Rubens’ workshop. One of these works is the engraving entitled ‘’St George slays the dragon’. In these later works he continues to work in Rubens’ style and based on his paintings. No paintings by him are known.

== Bibliography and links ==
- BALIS, A., ‘Rubens and his Studio: Defining the Problem’, in: Rubens. A Genius at Work. Lannoo Publishers (Acc) (March 14, 2008), (p. 30-51)
- BEKKERS, L., ‘Tekeningen uit Rubens Cantoor: de schatkamer van Willem Panneels’, in: Kunstbeeld, vol. 6, 1993 (p. 34-35)
- BÜTTNER, N., Herr P.P. Rubens, von der Kunst berühmt zu werden, Vandenhoeck & Ruprecht, Göttingen, 2006 (p. 109-127)
- BUYLE, C., ‘Kopiëren om te leren, het documentatiecentrum van Rubens’, in: Kunst & Cultuur, Vol. 6, 1993, (p. 44-45)
- HELD, J.S., Rubens Cantoor, the drawings of Willem Panneels. A critical catalogue, JSTOR
- SUTTON, P.C., The Age of Rubens, Boston, Museum of Fine Arts, 1993, p. 165
