= Self-Portrait (1969 film) =

1969 British film by Yoko Ono

- Directed by: Yoko Ono
- Starring: John Lennon
- Release date: 10 September 1969
- Running time: 42 minutes
- Country: United Kingdom

Self-Portrait was a 1969 film made by the artist Yoko Ono. Premiering at the Institute of Contemporary Arts in London on 10 September 1969, the 42-minute film consisted of a single shot of her husband John Lennon's semi-erect penis.

== Background ==
On March 20, 1969, John Lennon and Yoko Ono married after ten months of dating. Yoko made several films in cooperation with Lennon. One of these films is Self-Portrait, which was released in 1969. It was a film that showed John Lennon's penis for 42 minutes. This proved to be too unconventional for audiences; the film was never reshown following its initial screening.

== Synopsis ==
Self-Portrait is one long shot of John Lennon's semi-erect penis. As in Ono's One: Fluxfilm No. 14 (aka Match) (1966) film, slow motion is used to extend the sense of time. At the end of Self-Portrait, a drop of semen comes out of Lennon's penis. Lennon would later state in an interview about the film that the semen drop was accidental, and that the original idea was for his penis to rise and fall.

Ono had intended to film audience members reacting to Self-Portrait. This footage was intended to be part of another variation (a split-screen presentation, like in Andy Warhol's 1966 film Chelsea Girls) of Self-Portrait, in which the crowd's reactions would be projected alongside the image of Lennon's penis. However, the recording equipment failed to record anything of the audience. It is assumed this was a lighting issue, because in the summer of 1968, a hidden camera successfully secretly filmed the public reaction to John Lennon's "You Are Here" art exhibition and also worked as part of the Plastic Ono Band multimedia sculpture presented in absentia by Lennon and Ono at the Apple Records launch party for The Plastic Ono Band's record single "Give Peace a Chance" held at the Chelsea Town Hall on July 3, 1969.

== Critical response ==
In 2009, renowned film critic Philip French, who was one of the few people to have seen Self-Portrait, would go on to describe his opinion of the film stating:

"One film had the camera simply staring at Lennon's penis. Lasting some 40 minutes (it seemed like an eternity), it focused upon the unaided tumescence and detumescence of his member, reaching some sort of climax with a pearl-like drop of semen. The film, then jocularly known as "John Lennon's John Thomas" is actually called Self Portrait. The item listed in Yoko's filmography as Erection is in fact about John watching a hotel being built. John and Yoko were in the cinema, and during the performance there was a door open to the left of the screen with a sharp red light directed towards the auditorium. No one enquired about this, but it was later revealed Yoko had installed equipment to film the critics' reaction to John's comings and goings. The audience was to be one half of a split-screen feature: John showing his all, the critics responding to it frame by frame. Fortunately or unfortunately Yoko's apparatus recorded nothing. Sighs of relief all around. Otherwise that Film Critics' Circle might now be part of a permanent installation projected on the wall of Liverpool’s John Lennon International Airport."

== Release ==
The film was premiered at the ICA in 1969, alongside two other films, Rape and Folding. The programme described it as the "first audio-visual and smell film." Ono's films Two Virgins, Smile and Honeymoon were also shown at the ICA on the same night.

Ono said in a 1970 interview with the film critic Philip French that "the critics wouldn't touch it".
