= Self-Portrait (Bril) =

Painting by Paul Bril

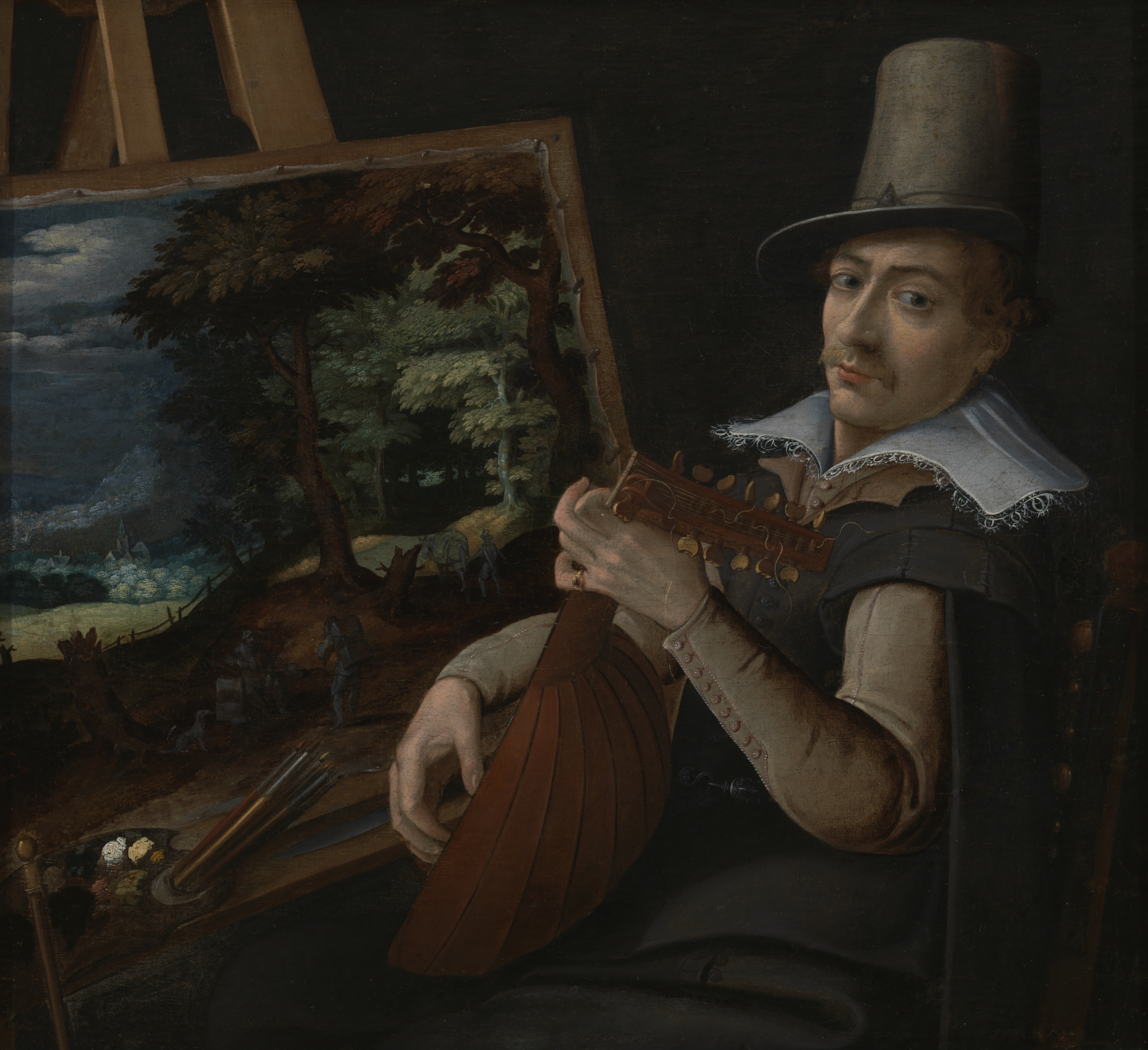
- Artist: Paul Bril
- Year: ca. 1595 – 1600
- Medium: Oil on canvas
- Dimensions: 70.8 cm × 77.2 cm (27 7/8 in × 30 3/8 in)
- Location: Rhode Island School of Design Museum; Providence

Self-Portrait is an oil on canvas painting by Flemish painter Paul Bril. It was probably painted between 1595 and 1600, and is in the collection of the Rhode Island School of Design Museum in Providence, Rhode Island.

== Painting ==
The painting portraits the artist, elegantly dressed and holding a lute, sitting before his palette and easel, on which a landscape painting sits.

Bril is seen from the back, and is turning towards the viewer. He grasps the lute firmly, with active and jointed fingers. The landscape painting sitting on the easel is typical of Bril's early work which is characterised by small figures, deep and shaded foregrounds and "masses of silvery foliage, attributes that [Bril] shared with other Flemish painters". This has helped with the dating of the work to ca. 1595 – 1600.

In this self-portrait Bril sought to show the viewer who he is and "what he stands for". Bril is serenading his own work, with his hand firmly grasping his lute. However, "very generously", he looks towards the viewer, inviting them "to the dialogue he is having with his own work in progress". The painter is sharing with the viewer a "gradually growing poetic force", to which he gives metaphorical manifestation in the music he's playing with the lute. He is "inviting us to be part of that mystery of creation".
