= Self-Portrait (Simon Vouet) =

Painting by Simon Vouet

Self-portrait
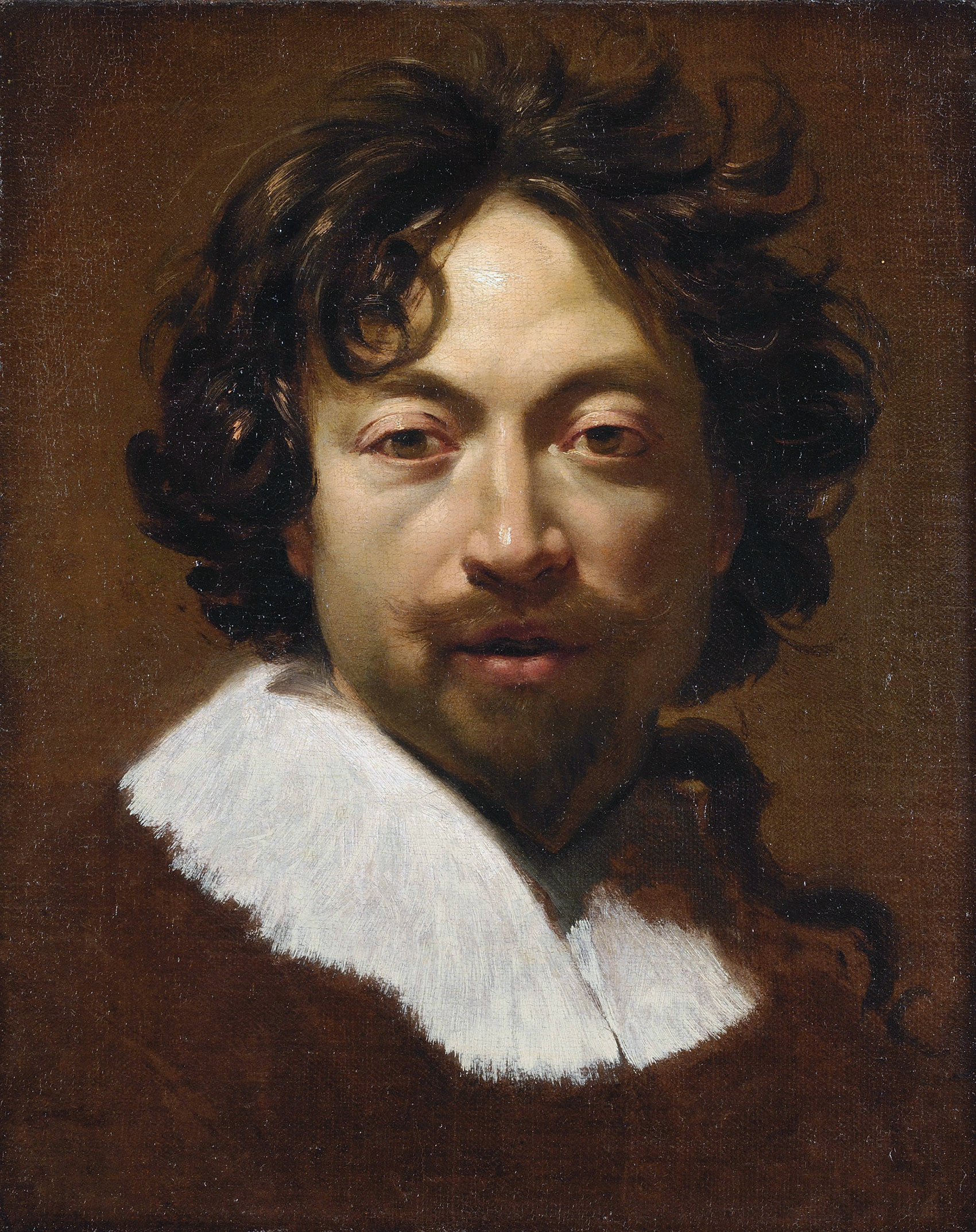
- Artist: Simon Vouet
- Year: 1626–1627
- Dimensions: 45 cm (18 in) × 36.5 cm (14.4 in)
- Location: France

Self-Portrait is an oil-on-canvas painting by the French artist Simon Vouet, painted c. 1626–1627 during his stay in Rome as a protégé of Pope Urban VIII and Cardinal Francesco Maria del Monte, before Louis XIII recalled him to France in 1627. It may have been produced as a marriage gift to his new wife Virginia Vezzi, whom Vouet married in 1626, the same year as he began the self-portrait. It is now in the Musée des Beaux-Arts de Lyon.
