= Self-Portrait (Jordaens) =

Painting by Jacob Jordaens

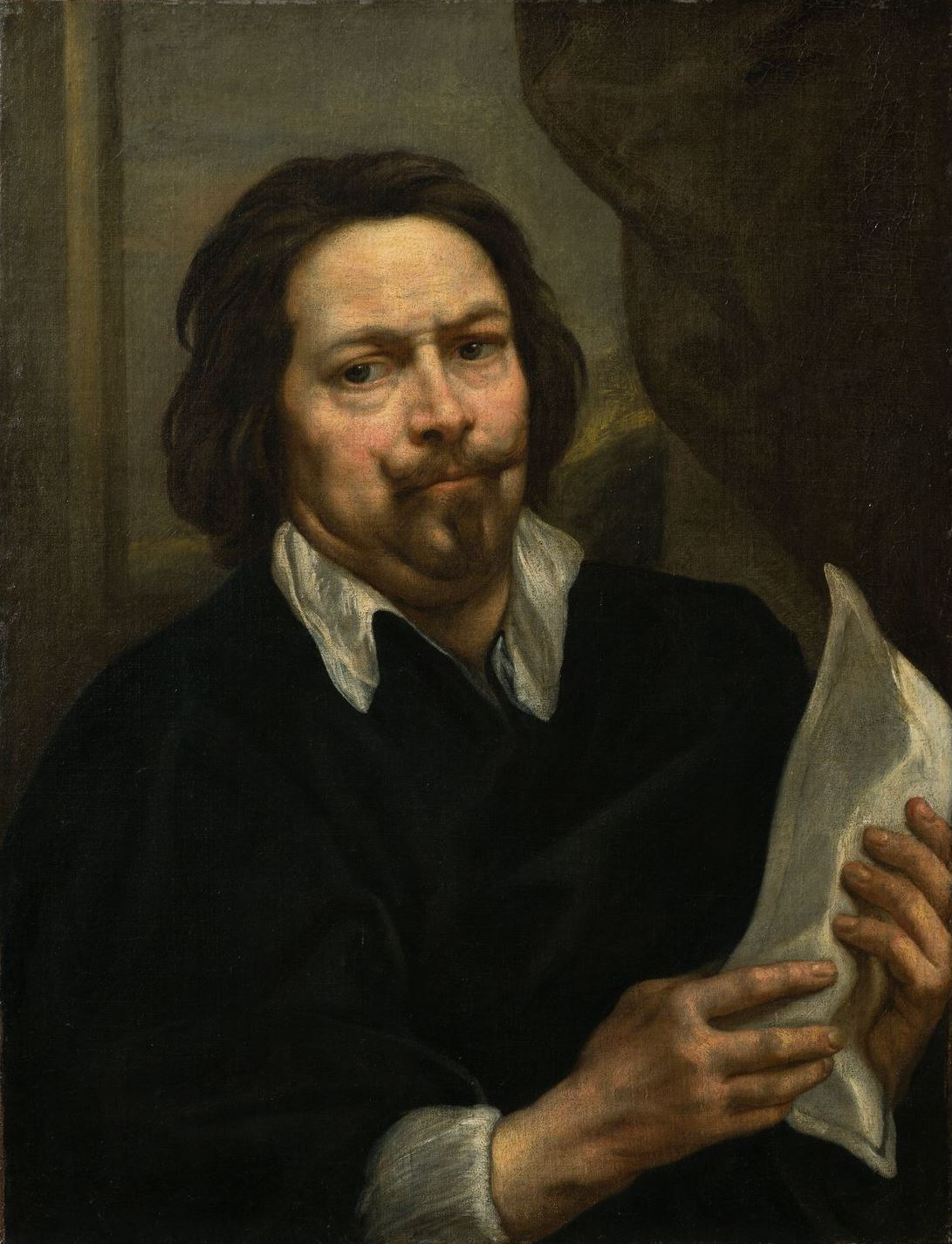
- Artist: Jacob Jordaens
- Year: c. 1648-1650
- Medium: Oil on canvas
- Movement: Flemish Baroque
- Dimensions: 101 cm × 84 cm (40 in × 33 in)
- Location: Rubenshuis (on loan); Antwerp

Self-Portrait is an oil on canvas painting by the Flemish artist Jacob Jordaens, c. 1648-1650. It is held on a loan at the Rubenshuis, in Antwerp

== Description ==
The painter lifts his eyes from a sheet of paper, possibly a letter, that he holds in his hand to look toward the viewer. He conveys a sense of confidence and humility. He is dressed in indoor attire, expensive despite its seemingly casual appearance, consisting of a simple-collared white shirt, a jacket trimmed with gold braid, and prominent buttons.

Jordaens painted and drew several self-portraits, where he consistently depicts himself in bust form, often with a sheet of paper in hand. He has a painting for background.

== Provenance ==
In 2016 Madame Generet left the painting and Anthony van Dyck's The Apostle Matthew from her private collection to the heritage fund of King Baudouin Foundation in Belgium. It is now on long-term loan to the Rubenshuis, in Antwerp.
