= Self-portrait (van Dyck, Vienna) =

Painting by Anthony van Dyck

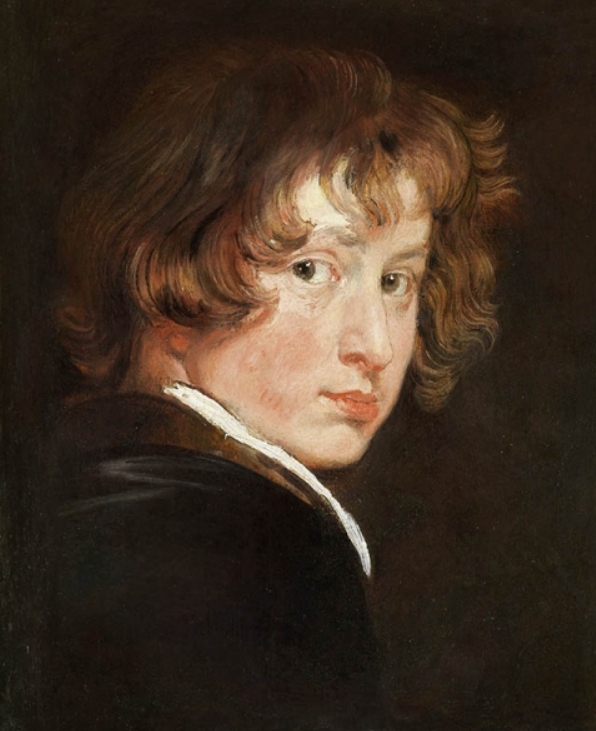
- Artist: Anthony van Dyck
- Year: 1613–1614
- Medium: Oil on canvas
- Dimensions: 25.8 cm × 19.4 cm (10.2 in × 7.6 in)
- Location: Academy of Fine Arts Vienna

The Self-portrait of 1613–1614 is the first surviving self-portrait by the Flemish artist Anthony van Dyck, showing him aged about fifteen. At that date he was still working for Hendrick van Balen but was about to join Peter Paul Rubens's studio. Self-portraiture was a typical artform in the Northern Renaissance and had already been used by Rubens and Jan van Eyck.

== See also ==
- List of paintings by Anthony van Dyck

== Bibliography ==
- Gian Pietro Bellori, Vite de' pittori, scultori e architecti moderni, Torino, Einaudi, 1976.
- Didier Bodart, Van Dyck, Prato, Giunti, 1997.
- Justus Müller Hofstede, Van Dyck, Milan, Rizzoli/Skira, 2004.
- Stefano Zuffi, Il Barocco, Verona, Mondadori, 2004.
- Marco Horak, Van Dyck tra i grandi ritrattisti nelle raccolte piacentine, in "Panorama Musei", anno XVI, no. 2, August 2011
