= Self-Portrait (Titian, Madrid) =

c. 1560 painting by Titian

Self-portrait
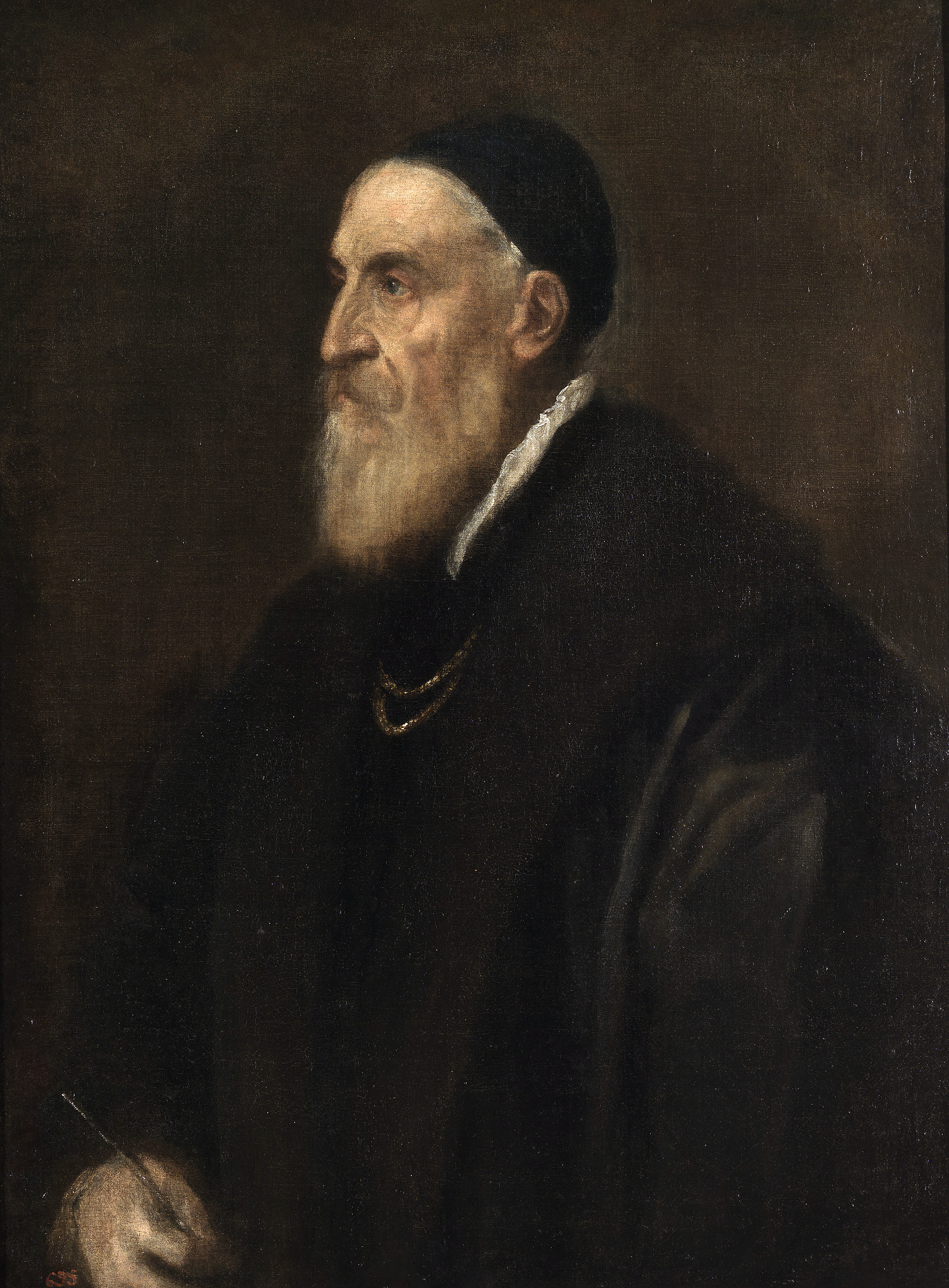
- Artist: Titian
- Year: c. 1567
- Medium: oil on canvas
- Dimensions: 86 cm × 65 cm (34 in × 26 in)
- Location: Museo del Prado; Madrid

Self-Portrait is an oil-on-canvas painting by the Italian painter Titian. Dating to about 1560, when Titian would have been over 70 years old, it is the later of his two surviving self-portraits. It is held in the Museo del Prado, in Madrid. The painting is a realistic and unflattering depiction of the physical effects of old age, and as such shows none of the self-confidence of his earlier self-portrait (c. 1546–47) now in Berlin. That painting shows Titian in three-quarter view in an alert pose.

Titian looks remote, aged and gaunt, staring into the middle distance, seemingly lost in thought. Yet the portrait conveys dignity, authority and the mark of a master painter.

== Description ==
Titian is dressed in simple but expensive clothes. He holds a paintbrush In the lower left corner of the canvas. This gives legitimacy to his status as a renowned painter; an element absent in the earlier Berlin portrait, and makes the work one of the earliest self-portraits in western art where the artist directly refers to himself as a painter. Titian's influence was such that the work led to numerous self-portraits by later generations of artists, including Velázquez and Goya, who in, respectively, Las Meninas (1656) and Charles IV of Spain and His Family (1800–1801) depicted themselves in the act of painting.

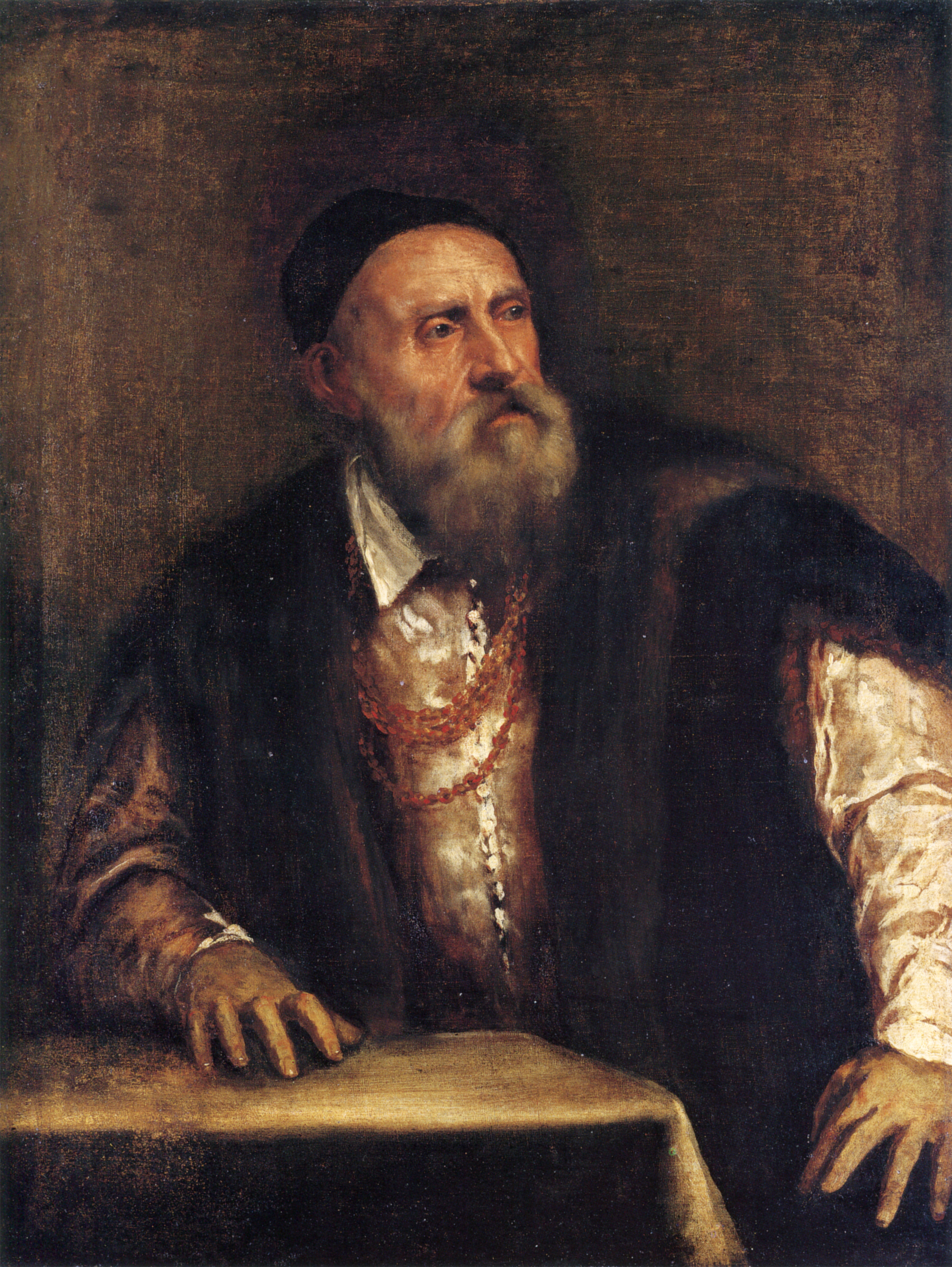
Self-portrait (c. 1560–1562), 96 cm × 72 cm. Gemäldegalerie, Berlin

The portrait is composed of deep shades of rich and distinguished black and brown, with small touches of white around his face and hair, and on his neckline and chain. The background is flat, which serves to focus the viewer's attention on the sitter's sharp facial features: his high forehead, hooked nose, long beard and penetrating, deeply set eyes. Here, Titian's command of paint and shade marks a high point of his late period, and while the physical charisma seen in the Berlin picture has been diminished by age, it is now replaced with a sense of authority.

== Interpretation ==
Titian was keenly aware of how others perceived him, and sought to control his reputation by keeping public knowledge of his life to a minimum. Giorgio Vasari noted that by this stage Titian was successful and wealthy enough to not depend on commissioned work. His self-portrait seems intended to enhance how he was viewed by others and draw attention to both his advanced age and—through his fine clothes and portrait in profile (a view then reserved for only the most noble)—his status.

Titian inserted a similar self-portrait in which he wore a skull cap in his The Virgin and Child with Saints Titian and Andrew, which he intended for his tomb in Pieve di Cadore.

== Sources ==
- Areti, Pietro. Titian's portraits through Aretino's lens. Pennsylvania State University, 1995. ISBN 0-271-01339-7
- Classen, Albrecht. Old age in the Middle Ages and the Renaissance. Walter de Gruyter, 2007. ISBN 3-11-019548-8
- Enenkel, K. A. E. Modelling the Individual: Biography and Portrait in the Renaissance. Rodopi B.V.Editions, 1998. ISBN 90-420-0782-6
- Hall, James. The Self-portrait: A Cultural History. London: Thames & Hudson, 2014. ISBN 978-0-5002-3910-0
- Hope, Charles & Fletcher, Jennifer & Dunkerton, Jill. Titian. National Gallery London, 2003. ISBN 1-85709-904-4
- Kaminski, Marion. Titian. Ullmann, 2007. ISBN 978-3-8331-3776-1
