= Self-Portrait (Titian, Berlin) =

Painting by Titian

Self-portrait
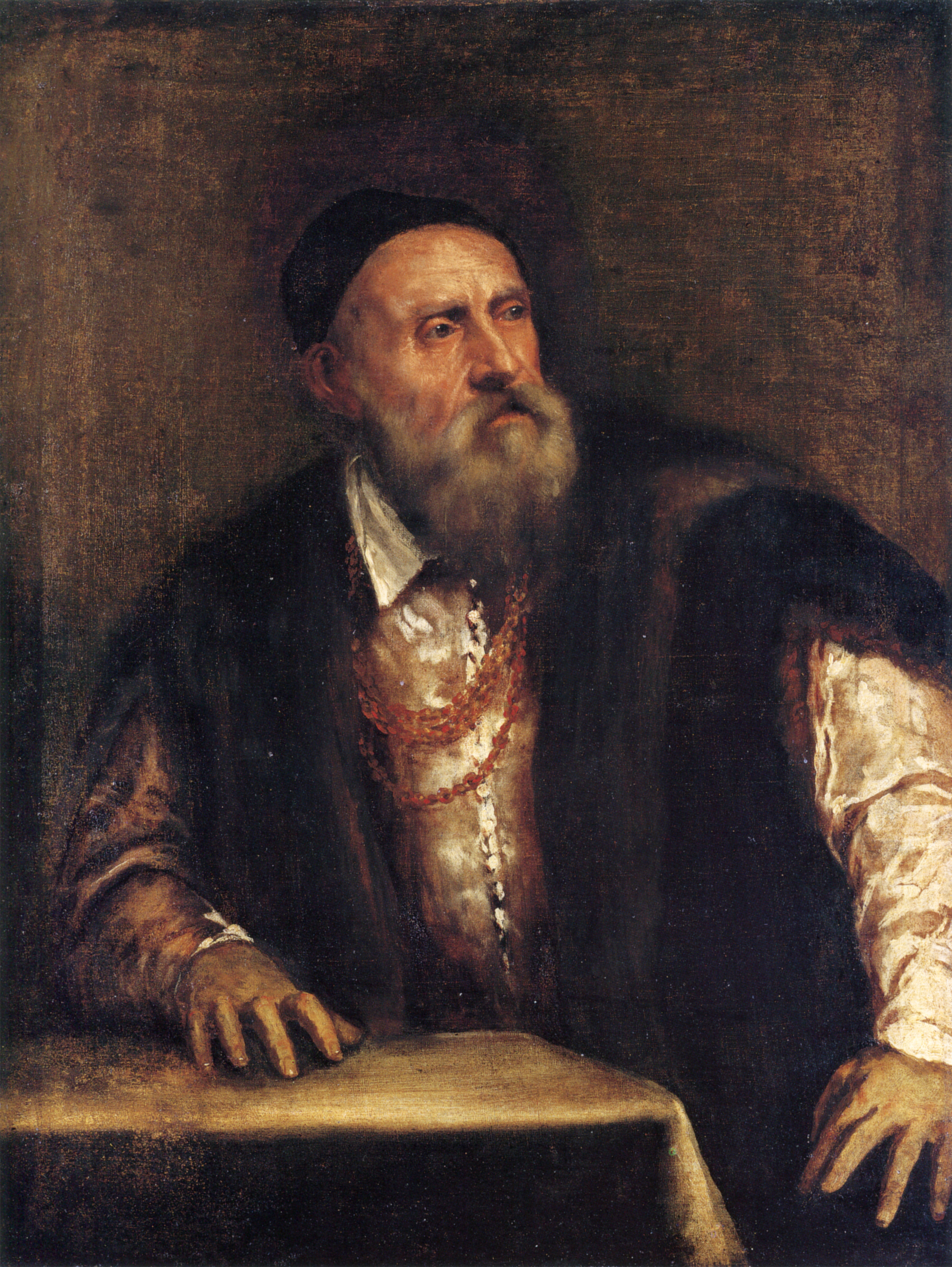
- Artist: Titian
- Year: c. 1546-1547
- Medium: oil on canvas
- Dimensions: 96 cm × 75 cm (38 in × 30 in)
- Location: Gemäldegalerie; Berlin

Self-Portrait is an oil on canvas self-portrait by the Venetian painter Titian, dated to between 1546 and 1547. While he painted a number of self-portraits in various formats, this is one of only two painted examples to survive. The other is in Madrid, dated c. 1560. Both share a sombre, reserved palette, although this work is richer in tonal variation and colour harmonisation.

The canvas is unfinished; his left hand and areas of his clothing are only roughly sketched. It has been suggested that the canvas is a modello, or study, for another now lost work. Another theory is that it was painted for family members in his memory after he died. Thematically and stylistically, the work can be associated with his 1545 Portrait of Pietro Aretino. A number of versions or variants exist, including drawings from his own hand and paintings attributed to his workshop.

== Origin and purpose ==
Parts of the canvas are unfinished, especially the hands, the dark area around his face, and the drapery. It remained in Titian's studio in the Biri Grande, Venice, until his death, which some art historians see as evidence that it was intended as a study, although it may just have been simply because it was unfinished.

The Italian painter, architect, and writer Giorgio Vasari wrote in 1568 that Titian had made a number of self-portraits for his family to remember him by, and it is likely that this was one, given that it was not sold in his lifetime. However, Vasari dates the portrait to c. 1562–64, this work more closely corresponds to a record of a version of a portrait given to Paolo Giovio in 1549.

== Description ==
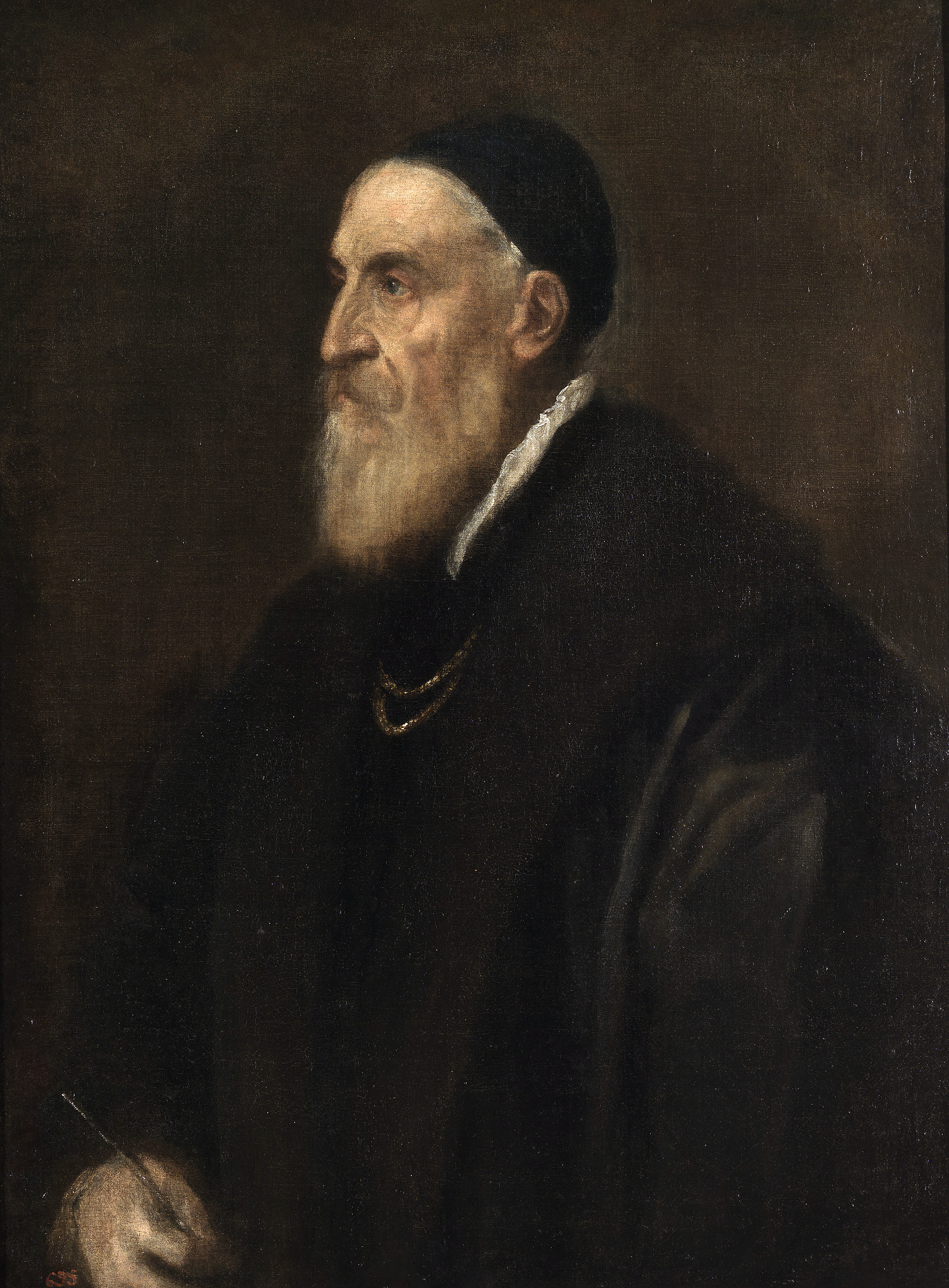
Self-Portrait (c. 1567), oil on canvas, 86 cm × 65 cm. Museo del Prado, Madrid

The painting's style is reminiscent of Titian's work from around 1560, especially in the thick, irregular application of white paint in large sections. He seems to be around 60 years old, giving credence to the earlier dating. He wears the golden chain of the Order of the Golden Spur, wrapped in three strands, which was given to him by the Emperor Charles V in 1533. The chain is intended to signify his knighthood and elevated social status. He wears a black cap in both paintings; a motif seen other of his later works. While the origins of the motif are unknown, it is probably intended to connect him with scholarship; similar headgear is often associated with Aristotle and St Jerome. A further explanation is that he sought to cover up a bald spot.

The portrait is half-length with Titian shown in three-quarters profile. He is seated behind a table, looking into the distance. Although his expression is complex and hard to properly interpret, it can be viewed as a more outward looking and optimistic expression than the 1567 Madrid self-portrait, and a number of art historians note the aging and physical decline he had undergone by the time of the later work. As with all of his independent self-portraits, he is looking to the side, avoiding the viewer, possibly out of humility, but in a dignified pose. He is shown with strong shoulders and a keen, alert gaze, in which some detect an air "of combativeness...disquietude...and misgiving".

Unlike the Madrid canvas, the portrait does not refer to his occupation as a painter, although art historian David Rosand believes that "instead of an implement of his craft, however, the open brushwork itself declares the painter's art". Further, the emphasis on his hands may reference that as a painter his talent derived from them.

That the canvas is unfinished gives insight into Titian's working methods and techniques.

== Provenance ==
The painting was held in the Palazzo Barbarigo della Terrazza in Venice, presumably since 1581, when Titian's son, Pomponio Vecellio, sold his house with its entire inventory to the collector Cristoforo Barbarigo. It was purchased in 1815 by Leopoldo Cicognara. And almost immediately afterward it was sold to Solly collection. The painting was acquired by the Gemäldegalerie, Berlin from the Solly in the early 1820s.

== See also ==
- List of works by Titian

== Sources ==
- Jaffe, David, et al. In: Titian. London: National Gallery London, 2003. ISBN 1-85709-904-4
- Hall, James. The Self-portrait: A Cultural History. London: Thames & Hudson, 2014. ISBN 978-0-5002-3910-0
- Kaminski, Marion. Titian. Ullmann, 2007. ISBN 978-3-8331-3776-1
- Nichols, Tom. "Titian and the End of the Venetian Renaissance". Reaktion Books, 2013. ISBN 978-1-7802-3227-0
- Partridge, Loren. "Art of Renaissance Venice, 1400 1600". University of California Press, 2015. ISBN 978-0-5202-8179-0
- Phillips, Claude. Titian. New York: Parkstone, 2016. ISBN 978-1-7852-5734-6
- Richter, George Martin. "Two Titian Self-Portraits". The Burlington Magazine for Connoisseurs, Vol. 58, No. 337, 1931
- Rosand, David. "Titian Draws Himself". Artibus et Historiae, Vol. 30, No. 59, 2009
- Tsaneva, Maria. "Titian: 130 Paintings and Drawings". Lulu Press, 2014. ISBN 978-1-3047-7310-4
