= Self-Portrait (El Greco) =

Painting by El Greco

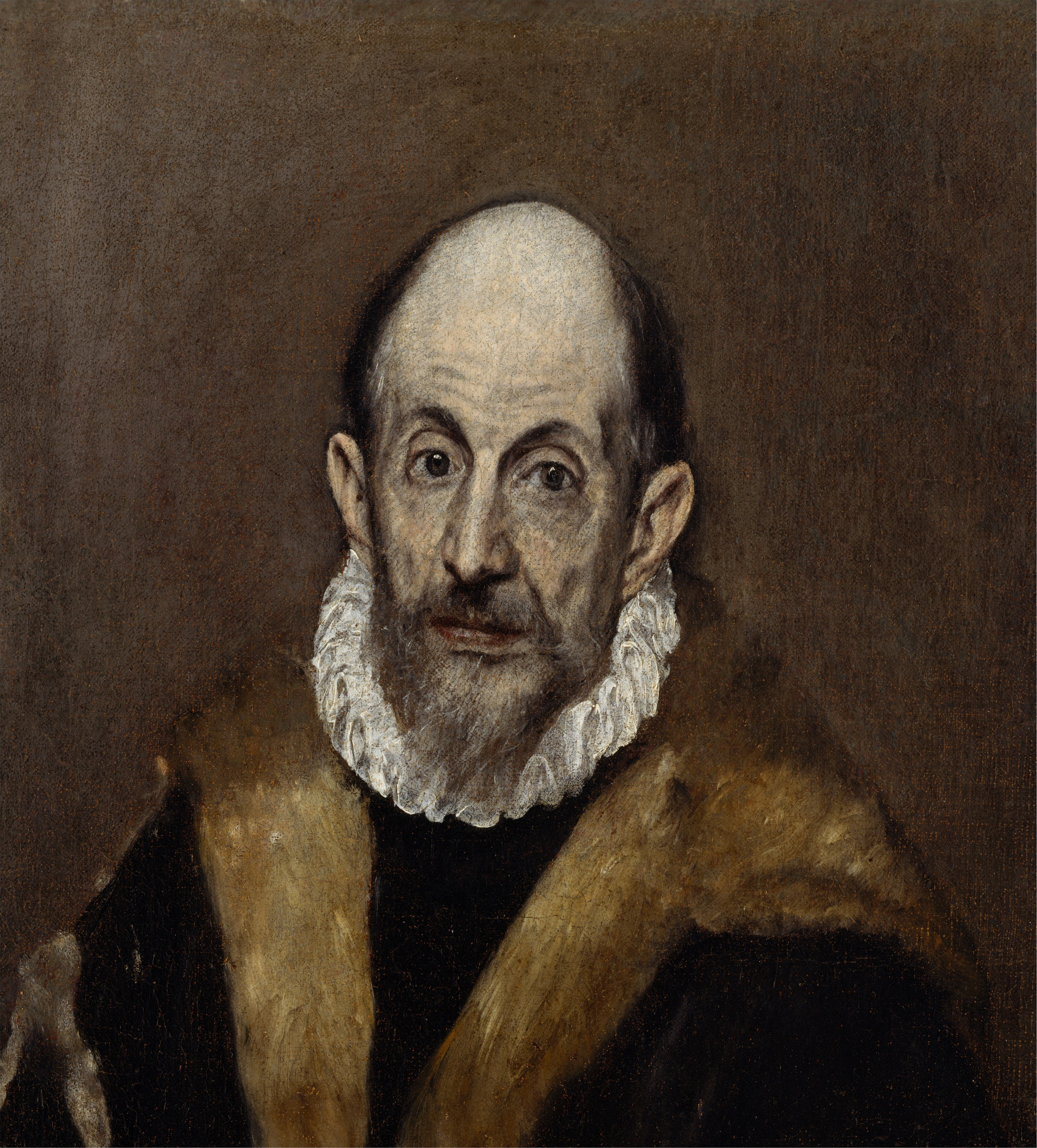
- Artist: El Greco
- Year: 1595-1600
- Medium: Oil on canvas
- Dimensions: 52.7 cm × 46.7 cm (20.7 in × 18.4 in)
- Location: Metropolitan Museum of Art, New York
- Accession: 24.197.1

Self-Portrait or Portrait of an Old Man is an oil-on-canvas painting by El Greco, likely dating between 1595 and 1600. The work's distinction as a self-portrait has been widely debated by scholars for over a century. Identification as a self-portrait is supported by the idea that the same figure appears several times in El Greco's oeuvre, aging alongside the artist. Critics of this work's identification as a self-portrait point to a lack of evidence to positively identify it as such. It shows the influence of Titian and Tintoretto, whose works El Greco studied in Venice. It is currently in the Metropolitan Museum of Art in New York.

== Visual description ==
This painting takes the form of a half-length portrait. It depicts an older man against a brown background. The man is dressed in a coat and wears a ruffle around his neck in a style that was popular in the 1590s. His eyes are sunken into the face and he has a receded hairline, features which communicate the advanced age of the subject.

== Influences ==
El Greco was born on the island of Crete in Greece and was trained as a Christian icon painter. This influence is shown in the empty monochromatic background of the portrait. He moved to Venice in 1567 where he studied and was influenced by the works of Titian, Tintoretto, Veronese, and Bassano. According to scholar Richard G. Mann, El Greco's later work was inspired by his time studying Venetian art. Venetian influence can be seen in the use of loose brushwork on the coat and a lack of hard contour lines.

== Identity of figure ==
The identity of the sitter for this portrait has been debated by scholars since 1900.

=== Identification as a self-portrait ===
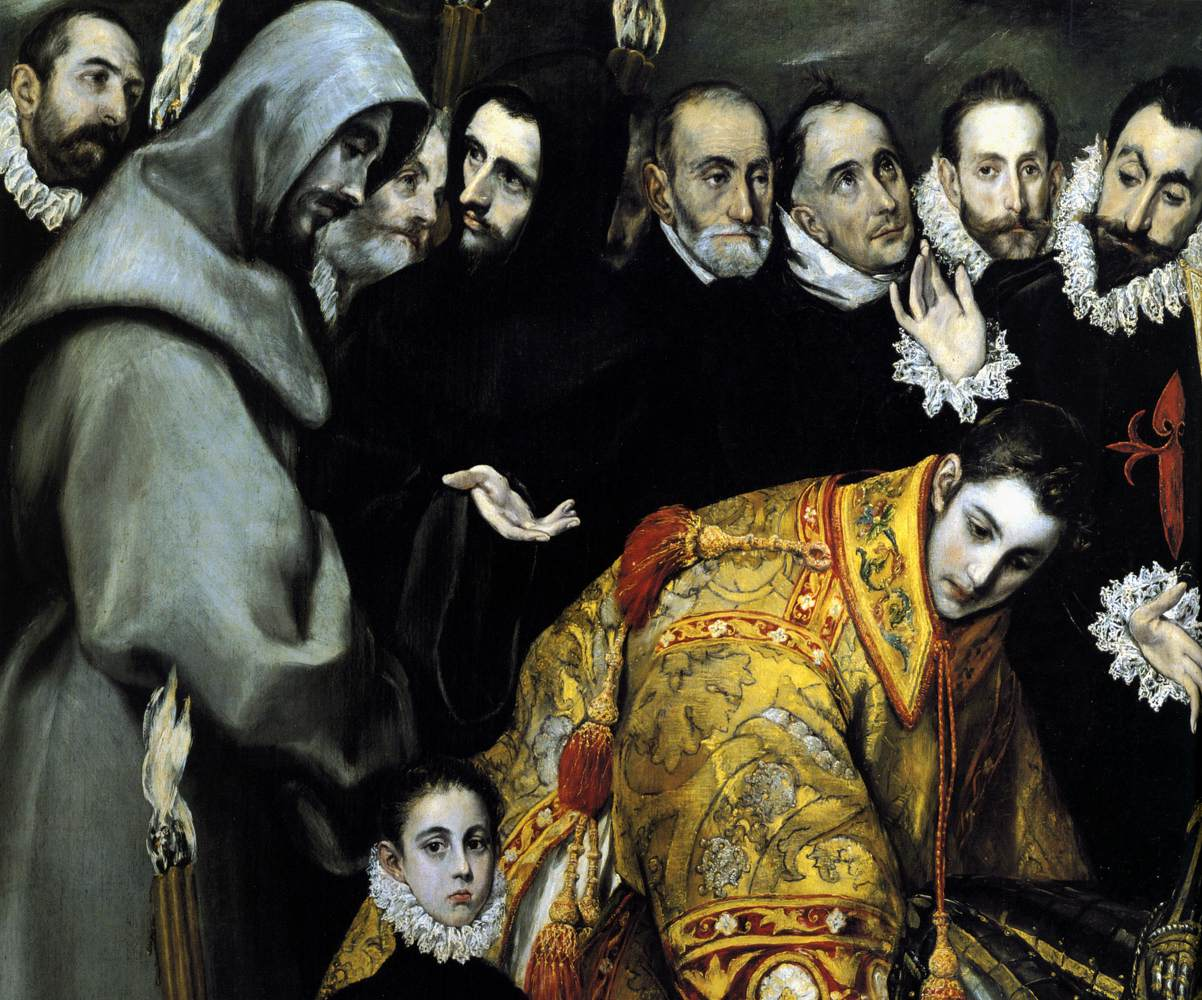
Burial of the Count of Orgaz, by El Greco, detail. Burroughs argues for similarities between the self-portrait in this work and the appearance of the sitter in El Greco's alleged Self-Portrait.

In 1900, this work was identified by Salvador Sanpere y Miguel for the first time in scholarly writing as a self-portrait. The argument that the work is indeed a self-portrait, championed by Bryson Burroughs in 1925, claims that the figure in this work has appeared in several other paintings by El Greco, including The Disrobing of Christ and "The Burial of the Count of Orgaz. A major advancement for the argument that "Portrait of an Old Man" is a portrait of the artist is August L. Mayer's 1926 claim which links the work to the 1621 Inventory of the Possessions of El Greco's son Jorge Manuel Theotocopuli. Mayer alleges that this work can be identified as article number 189 of the inventory, which describes "a portrait of my father, with a black frame". In 1993, Fernando Marías linked this work to a different item in Jorge Manuel Theotocopuli's inventory, item number 258, described as a half-length self-portrait of El Greco. In his 2011 scholarly biography on the artist, Marías also described the painting as a self-portrait.

=== Arguments against identification as a self-portrait ===
The first scholar to dispute the identification as a self-portrait was Paul Lafond in 1906, who cited a lack of evidence identifying the sitter as the artist himself. Lafond himself, however, identified the painting as Portrait of El Greco? in his 1913 book on the artist, possibly as a reference to the ongoing academic debate surrounding the piece. Elizabeth du Gué Trapier was the first scholar to refer to the painting as Portrait of an Old Man in 1925. August L. Mayer's 1926 argument for identification as a self-portrait was generally accepted by scholars until Harry B. Wehle's 1940 catalogue which points to a lack of evidence connecting the work to Jorge Manuel Theotocopuli's inventory. Harold E. Wethey corroborated this argument in 1962, claiming that the sitter of the portrait does not resemble figures in other works by El Greco that are accepted by scholars to be self-portraits. Another theory, posited in 1992 by Deborah Krohn, claims that the subject of the portrait may have been a relative of El Greco's. This is due to visual similarities between the sitter and El Greco's son, Jorge Manuel Theotocopuli.

== Dating ==
The exact creation date for Portrait of an Old Man is unknown, and has been widely debated by scholars. Scholarly debate surrounding the date centers around the age of the sitter as well as the clothing worn by the subject.

Prospective dates for the portrait range from 1579 to 1610. The earliest possible date for the work, as posited by José Gudiol, is 1579. This interpretation for an early dating relies on the idea that the work is not a self-portrait. In 1579, the artist would have only been 38, too young to paint himself as an old man. The most accepted date range for this work place it firmly in the 1590s. This date range is supported by the style of the ruffle worn by the subject. According to scholar Keith Christiansen, experts in Spanish dress of the era note that the width of the sitter's ruffle was popular in the fashion of the 1590s. The latest possible date, 1610, was suggested by Paul Guinard. This interpretation places the portrait's creation towards the end of the artist's career. Guinard's idea is supported by a trend in portraits of older individuals in which formal ruffles appear ten to fifteen years out of style.

== Provenance and exhibition history ==
=== Provenance ===
- Owned by Marqués de Heredia until 1892.
- Sold by Marqués de Heredia to art critic and historian Aureliano de Beruete y Moret in 1892.
- Owned by Aueliano de Beruete y Moret until his death in 1922.
- Inherited by Aueliano de Beruete y Moret's widow upon his death in 1922.
- Sold to the Metropolitan Museum of Art in 1924.

=== Exhibition history ===
This work has been exhibited extensively throughout Europe and North America, and has more recently been exhibited in Japan.

- "Exposición de las obras de Domenico Theotocopuli, llamado El Greco". Museo Nacional de Pintura y Escultura. Madrid, Spain. 1902.
- "Exhibition of Spanish Old Masters". Grafton Galleries. London, England. October 1913–January 1914.
- "Exhibition of Spanish Paintings". Royal Academy of Arts. London, England. November 1920–January 1921.
- "Metropolitan Museum Masterpieces". Hofstra College. Hempstead, New York. June –September, 1952.
- "Spanish Masters". University of California at Los Angeles, Los Angeles, California; Fine Arts Gallery of San Diego. San Diego, California. January –May, 1960.
- "100 Paintings from the Metropolitan Museum". State Hermitage Museum. Leningrad (St. Petersburg), Russia; State Pushkin Museum. Moscow, Russia. May –November, 1975.
- "From El Greco to Cézanne: Masterpieces of European Painting from the National Gallery of Art, Washington, and The Metropolitan Museum of Art, New York". National Gallery Alexandros Soutzos Museum. Athens, Greece. December 1992 –April 1993.
- "El Greco: Identity and Transformation: Crete, Italy, Spain". Museo Thyssen-Bornemisza, Madrid, Spain; Palazzo delle Esposizioni, Rome, Italy; National Gallery Alexandros Soutzos Museum, Athens, Greece. February 1999 -January 2000.
- "El Greco". Kunsthistorisches Museum. Vienna, Austria. May –September, 2001.
- "El Greco". National Gallery. London, England. February –May, 2004.
- "Spanish Painting from El Greco to Picasso: Time, Truth, and History". Solomon R. Guggenheim Museum. New York, New York. November 2006–March 2007.
- "Picasso versus Rusiñol". Museu Picasso. Barcelona, Spain. May –September, 2010.
- "El Greco's Visual Poetics". National Museum of Art, Osaka, Japan; Tokyo Metropolitan Art Museum, Tokyo, Japan. October 2012 -April 2013.
- "The Greek of Toledo". Museo de Santa Cruz. Toledo, Spain. March -June 2014.
- "Picasso – El Greco". Kunstmuseum Basel. Basel, Switzerland. June -September 2022.

== Popular culture ==
This work has been widely circulated in the form of a Spanish postage stamp, created in 1965 to commemorate the 350th anniversary of the artist’s death.

== See also ==
- List of works by El Greco

== Bibliography ==
- (in Spanish) ÁLVAREZ LOPERA, José, El Greco, Madrid, Arlanza, 2005, Biblioteca «Descubrir el Arte», (colección «Grandes maestros»). ISBN 84-9550-344-1.
- (in Spanish) SCHOLZ-HÄNSEL, Michael, El Greco, Colonia, Taschen, 2003. ISBN 978-3-8228-3173-1.
- "El Greco (Domenikos Theotokopoulos) | Portrait of an Old Man". The Metropolitan Museum of Art. Retrieved 2024-10-09.
- Christiansen, Keith. "El Greco (1541–1614) | Essay | The Metropolitan Museum of Art | Heilbrunn Timeline of Art History". The Met’s Heilbrunn Timeline of Art History. Retrieved 2024-10-08.
- Dr. Lauren Kilroy-Ewbank, "El Greco, Burial of the Count Orgaz," in Smarthistory, August 9, 2015, accessed November 19, 2024, https://smarthistory.org/el-greco-burial-of-the-count-orgaz/.
