= Self-Portrait (Rembrandt, Florence) =

Painting by Rembrandt, c. 1669

Self-portrait
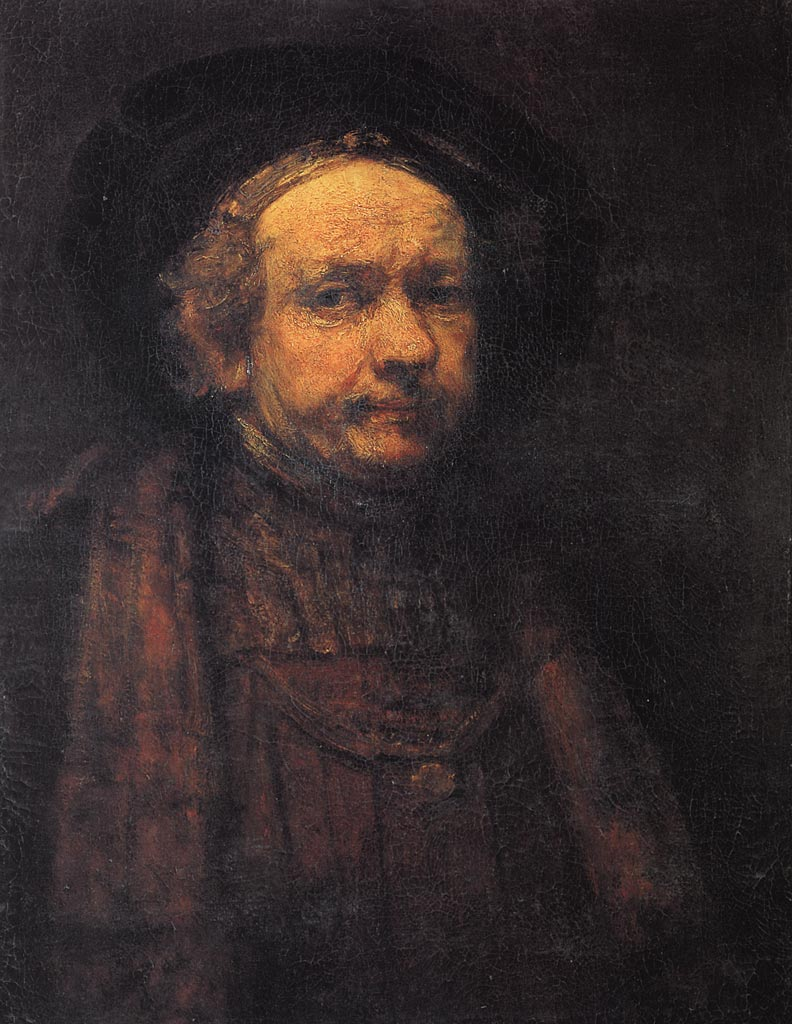
- Artist: Rembrandt
- Year: c. 1669
- Medium: oil paint, canvas
- Dimensions: 74 cm (29 in) × 55 cm (22 in)
- Location: Italy
- Accession: 69.232, 1871

Self-Portrait is a c. 1669 self-portrait by the Dutch artist Rembrandt, now in the Uffizi in Florence.

== See also ==
- Self-portraits by Rembrandt
- List of paintings by Rembrandt

== Sources ==
- http://www.bildindex.de/dokumente/html/obj20155044
