= Self-Portrait (Lampi) =

1933 painting by Vilho Lampi

- Omakuva (Finnish)
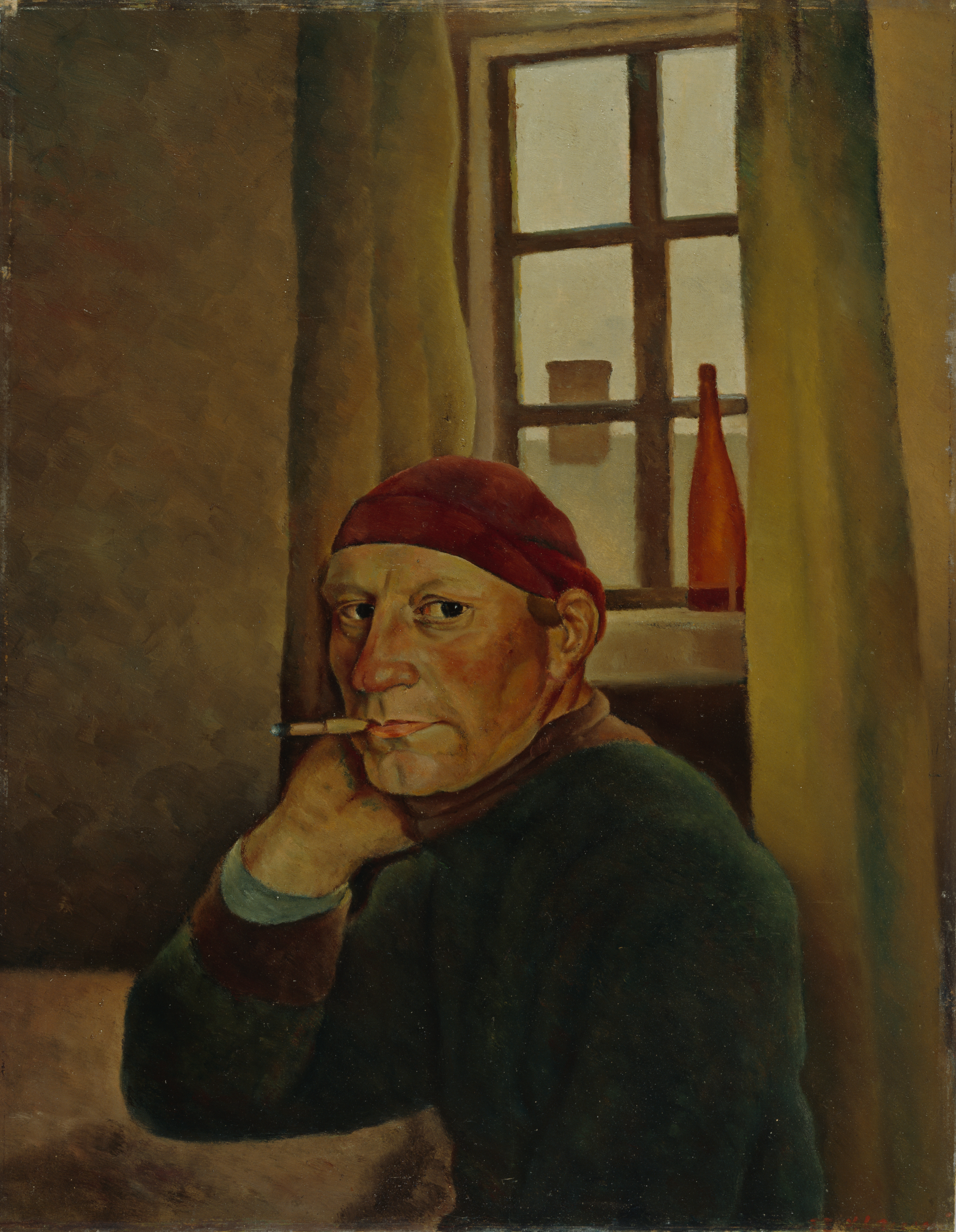
- Artist: Vilho Lampi
- Year: 1933
- Type: Oil on plywood
- Dimensions: 47 cm × 36.5 cm (19 in × 14.4 in)
- Location: Ateneum; Helsinki

Self-portrait is a painting by the Finnish artist Vilho Lampi (1898–1936) from 1933.

The painting measures 47 × 36.5 centimeters. It has been in the Ateneum in Helsinki since 1934.

Vilho Lampi created several self-portraits. In this image the artist is sitting at a table and smoking a cigarette.

== Other self-portraits by Vilho Lampi ==
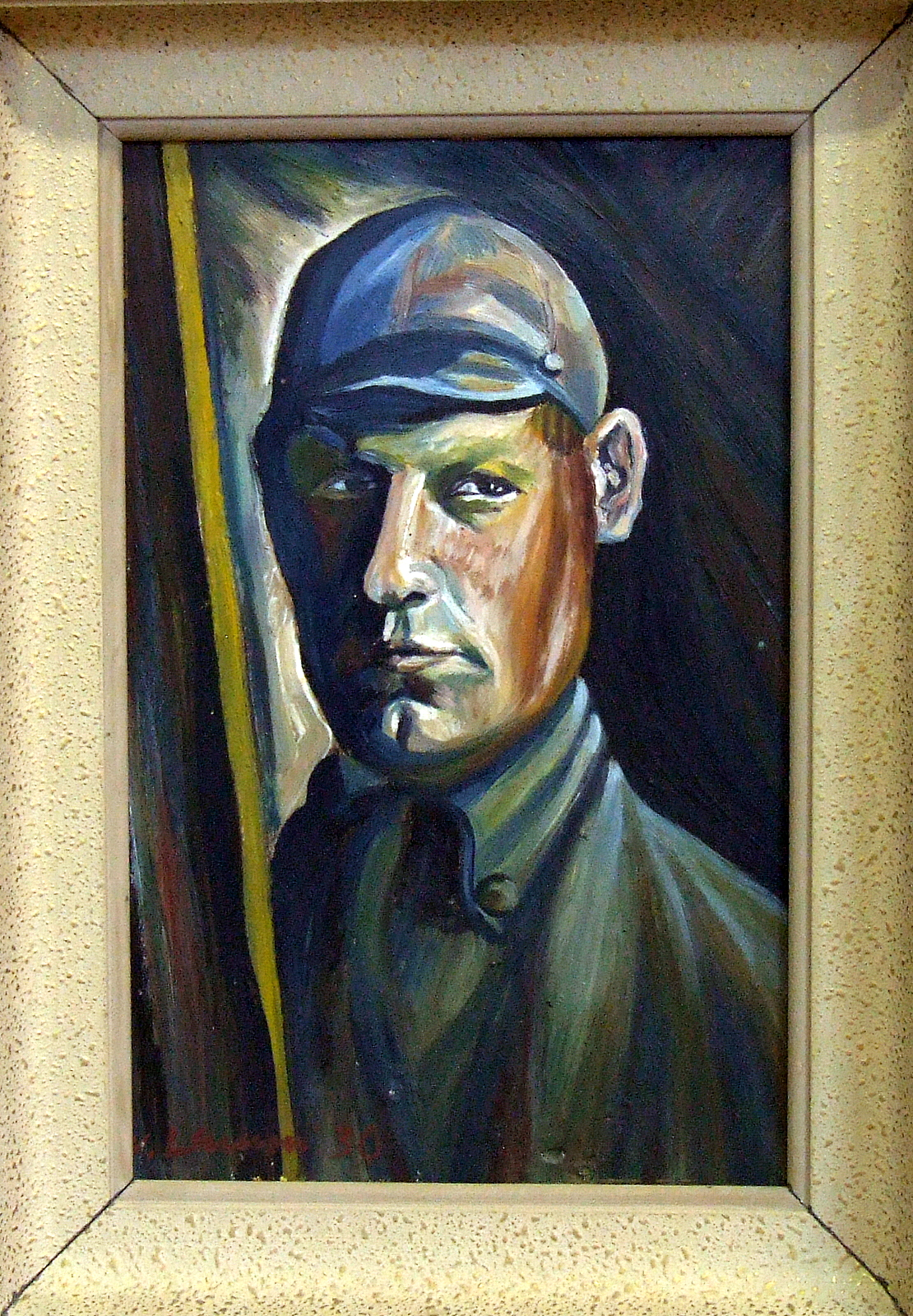
Självporträtt, 1931
