= Self-Portrait (Ellen Thesleff) =

Drawing by Ellen Thesleff

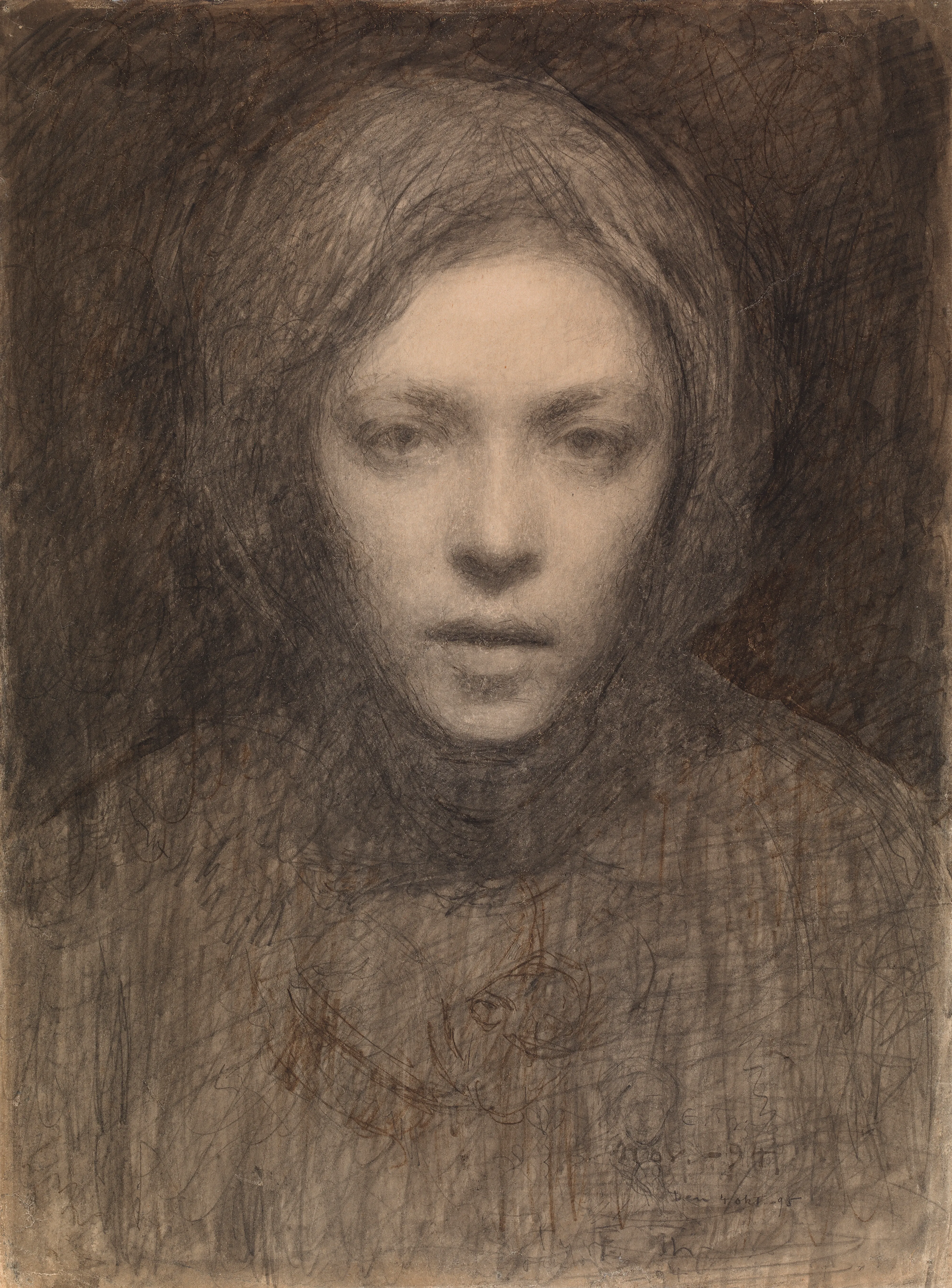
- Year: 1890s
- Medium: pencil, paper, sepia
- Subject: Ellen Thesleff
- Dimensions: 31.5 cm (12.4 in) × 23.5 cm (9.3 in)
- Location: Ateneum
- Collection: Finnish National Gallery
- Accession no.: A III 1867

Self-Portrait (Finnish: Omakuva) is a pencil and sepia ink on paper drawing by Finnish artist Ellen Thesleff (1869–1954) created from 1894 to 1895. It is one of nine early works produced from 1890 to 1905, sometimes referred to as her "natural" period. The drawing is believed to have been influenced by spiritualism and symbolism, an art movement popular in France at the fin de siècle. Thesleff uses a restrained, ascetic palette devoid of color to depict her likeness, which is interpreted as both introspective and transcendent. It is held by the Finnish National Gallery, Ateneum art museum, in Helsinki.

== Composition ==
A self-portrait of a colorless, but youthful, rounded oval face, in full-frontal view, emerges from a reddish-brown, textured, but indistinct background; the eyes of the face are open but the body belonging to the face is abstract, blurred by pencil strokes and the color of sepia ink; the clothing worn by the subject is indistinguishable as it dissolves into the background with each pencil stroke. The gaze is softly penetrating and introspective. The palette is muted and subdued. The drawing is composed in pencil and sepia ink made from the common cuttlefish on paper. It makes use of a minimal color aesthetic, sometimes referred to as color asceticism, or more controversially "black colorism". Art historians believe that Thesleff intentionally reduced her colors and used an achromatic palette due to the influence of Symbolism, where the lack of color was perceived as a kind of abstract harmony, or musical synesthesia. "Thesleff's ascetic and harmonious paintings", writes art historian Anna-Maria von Bonsdorff, "convey a deeply meditative mood and in an intense, concentrated, spiritual way which all unnecessary sensory or momentary clutter has been removed to be able to hear the true inner voice."

== Background ==
Ellen Thesleff (1869–1954) grew up in a Swedish-speaking family of artists and musicians, learning to sing and play piano while her father practiced painting in his leisure time. As a child, her family moved to Kuopio, Finland, where her father found work as an engineer. In Kuopio, she trained as an artist under Adolf von Becker as an adolescent in the 1880s. Later that decade, she studied drawing under Gunnar Berndtson in Helsinki. Her study with Berndtson first exposed her to the Impressionists. Thesleff was a true polyglot, writing and speaking Swedish, German, French, Italian, and English fluently. It is unclear as to how fluent she was in the Finnish language.

In the early 1890s, Thesleff lived on Boulevard Raspail in Paris and began attending the Académie Colarossi in 1891 as an art student, where her teachers were Pascal Dagnan-Bouveret and Gustave-Claude-Etienne Courtois. Unlike art schools in Finland, Thesleff was afforded more freedom as a woman artist in France, where she was able to study nude models. She also spent time in the Louvre studying form and color in the Department of Egyptian Antiquities. Thesleff was part of a larger group of Finnish artists, including Magnus Enckell and Väinö Blomstedt, who studied abroad and were influenced by the heady mixture of new ideas circulating in fin de siècle Paris. She completed several notable works during this time, including the drawing, Girl with a Guitar (1891), and the paintings Echo (1891), Thyra Elisabeth (1892), Aspens (1893), and Spring Night (1893).

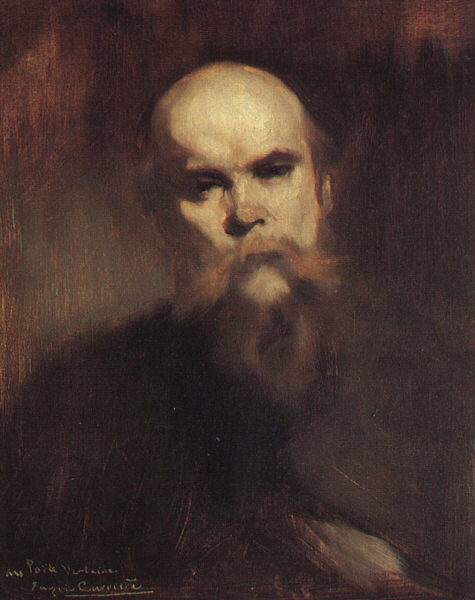
Paul Verlaine by Eugène Carrière (1890)

== Development ==
In January 1894, Thesleff graduated from the Académie Colarossi and headed to Italy, spending the spring in Florence working with fellow artist Helene Schjerfbeck and studying Renaissance art. Schjerfbeck and Thesleff both studied the frescoes of Fra Angelico at San Marco. Thesleff also traveled to Venice, Rome and Milan. She had previously studied Leonardo da Vinci in Paris, but now she was particularly taken with The Last Supper (1495–1498) at the Santa Maria delle Grazie. She completed a portrait of singer and poet Ingeborg von Alfthan (1894) that spring. Some sources indicate that Thesleff may have begun work on the Self-Portrait during her time in Florence, perhaps in the autumn. At the same time, she began working on several different self-portraits, (Note: There are at least three self-portraits in the related series: Self-Portrait (1894), which was completed in Florence and is now held by the Aine Art Museum, Self-Portrait (1894–95), the subject of this article, and Self-Portrait (1895), currently in a private collection.) with most remaining in the draft and study phase. Self-Portrait may have begun as a similar sketch along these same lines.

Leaving Italy, Thesleff spent the winter of 1894 with her family near the Bulevardi in Helsinki. She shared a room with her sister Gerda with an expansive view of the neighborhood. In one corner of the room, Thesleff made a space for herself, where a very large piece of furniture, a mirrored dressing table (also known as a chiffonier), was placed. It is thought that she may have used this mirror to work on her self-portraits. The Symbolism of French artist Eugène Carrière may have had a considerable impact on the development of the drawing, but Thesleff never spoke of Symbolism directly in her correspondence. When Thesleff visited Paris, Symbolism was a popular art movement, with its followers emphasizing "the unseen ... imagination, spirituality, and dreams". Bonsdorff believes that Thesleff used Symbolist ideas related to musical harmony and spirituality in her work.

There are two signatures on the drawing, indicating that her work continued for approximately a year in two separate stages, even though it was publicly exhibited between that time frame. The first signature is dated November 1894; Thesleff was 25 years of age when she first completed the work, but it was only finished in pencil at this stage. The second signature is dated October 1895, at which point the background had sepia ink added to it.

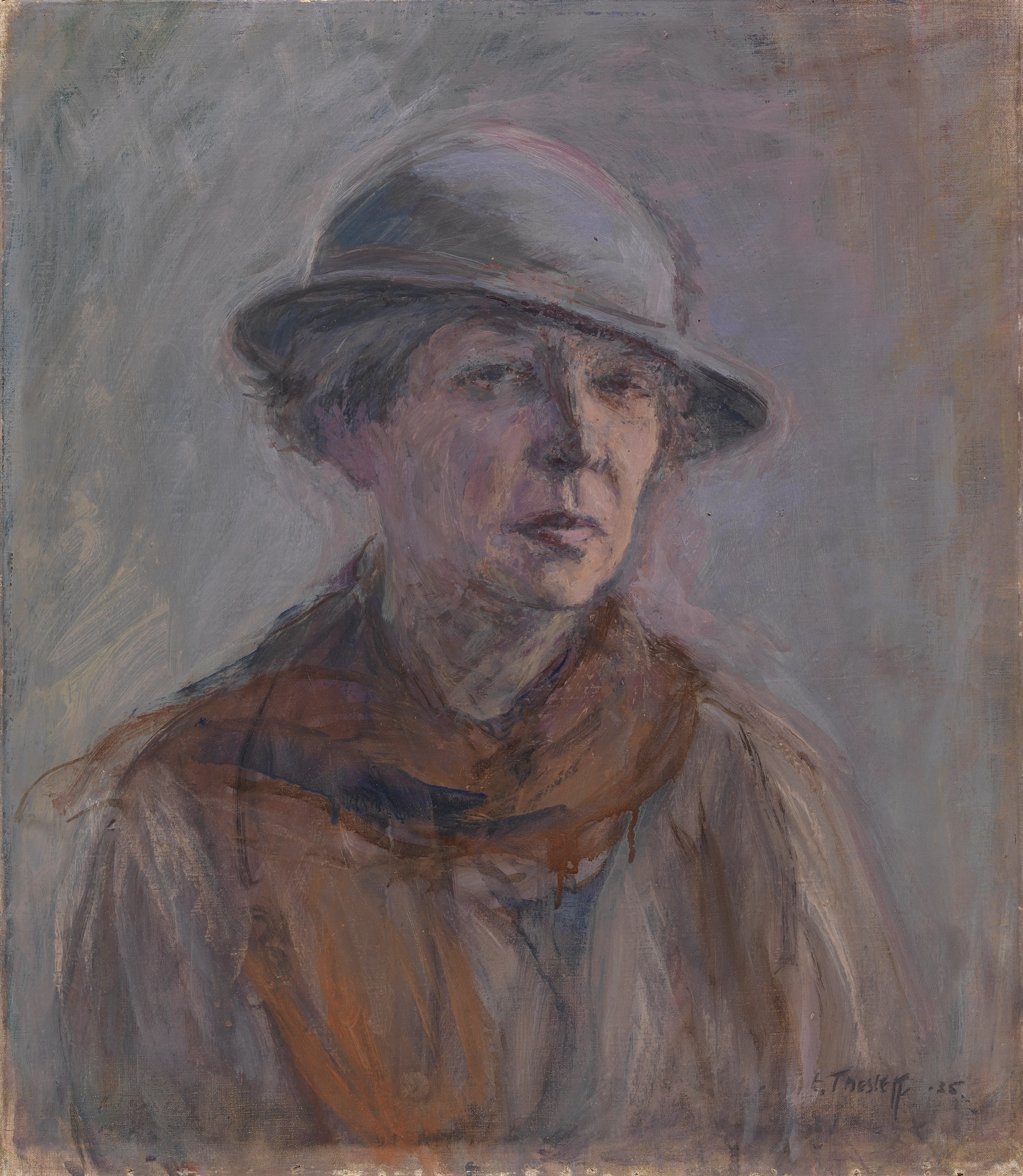
Self-Portrait with Hat (1935)

== Analysis ==
Finnish art historian Monica Schalin classifies the drawing as part of Thesleff's "natural" early period (1890–1905), which includes nine major works, of which five are paintings, two are drawings, and two are copper engravings and etchings. This natural technique makes use of a wide variety of styles, including elements of French realism, styles found in Nordic art such as stämningsmåleri or "mood painting", Symbolism, color asceticism, and synthetism. Schalin compares this early self-portrait to Thesleff's later ones, noting that in this self-portrait she tried to "portray her soul" in contrast to later self-portraits where she experiments with color (Self-Portrait, 1916) or paints herself more realistically (Self-Portrait with Hat, 1935) instead.

In 1890s France, Symbolist Albert Aurier and occultist Joséphin Péladan popularized the idea that the Italian Renaissance had reached the pinnacle of art, and advocated returning to those older, more traditional values, such as those found in the trinity of the great masters: Leonardo, Michelangelo, and Raphael. It is believed Thesleff was exposed to these ideas during her stay in Paris. Thesleff's interest in Renaissance art, particularly her emphasis on the human face in this drawing, evokes the kind of face that might be found in the works of Leonardo, which Thesleff studied closely during her time in Italy. Marja Lahelma believes Thesleff's self-portrait follows in an esoteric or occult tradition, proposing that Thesleff may have used early techniques of trance-like automatic drawing before surrealist automatism was popularized several decades later. Lahelma points to a well-established tradition of so-called unconscious, automatic drawing and mediumistic art techniques employed by artists and occultists, including, according to art historian Ernst Gombrich, those found in Leonardo's own A Treatise on Painting (coll. 1542, pub. 1652), as well as later 19th-century artists like Ernst Josephson, Fernand Desmoulin, and Henri Antoine Jules-Bois.

== Provenance ==
The work was first exhibited at the Finnish Art Society in the spring of 1895, in pencil only, where it was well received by critics. Artists Albert Edelfelt and Akseli Gallen-Kallela (then known as Gallén) both expressed their admiration for the work. Thesleff may have returned to work on the drawing once again after the first showing, with a second exhibition occurring in the fall at the Ateneum, this time with sepia ink added. The drawing was then gifted to Ernst Nordström, exhibition organizer and secretary of the Artists' Association of Finland, with the requirement that it be donated to an art collection accessible to the public after his death. Thesleff was reportedly unhappy with the decision to gift the drawing to Nordström, but was in general ambivalent about the social conventions of the art world. Nordström died in 1933, and the work was subsequently donated to the Finnish National Gallery, Ateneum art museum, where it remains today. For over the last century, the work has been exhibited 28 times in Europe, primarily in Finland, Sweden, France, Germany, Belgium, England, and Norway.

== Related work ==
Early period (1890–1905)

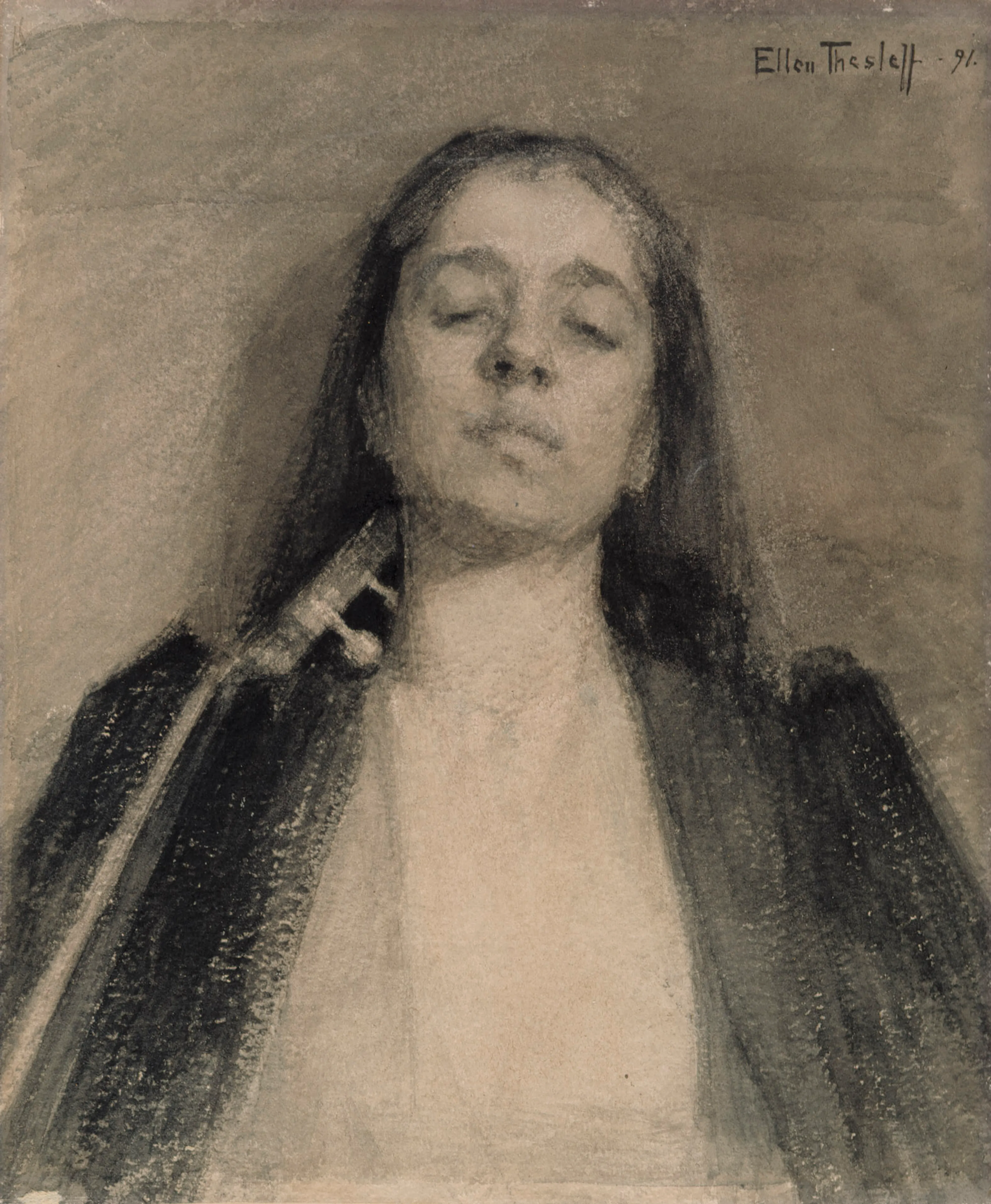
Girl with Guitar (1891)

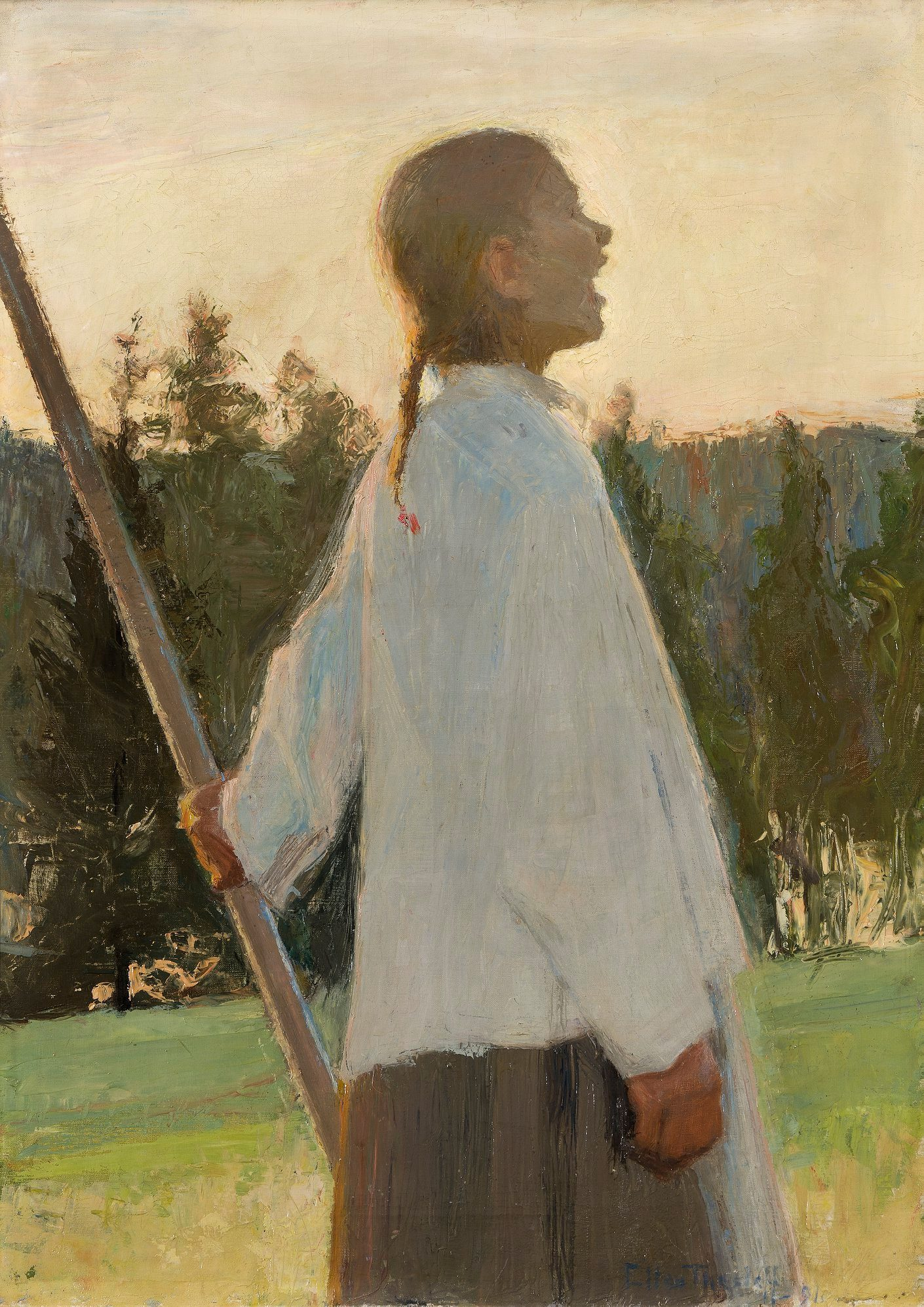
Echo (1891)

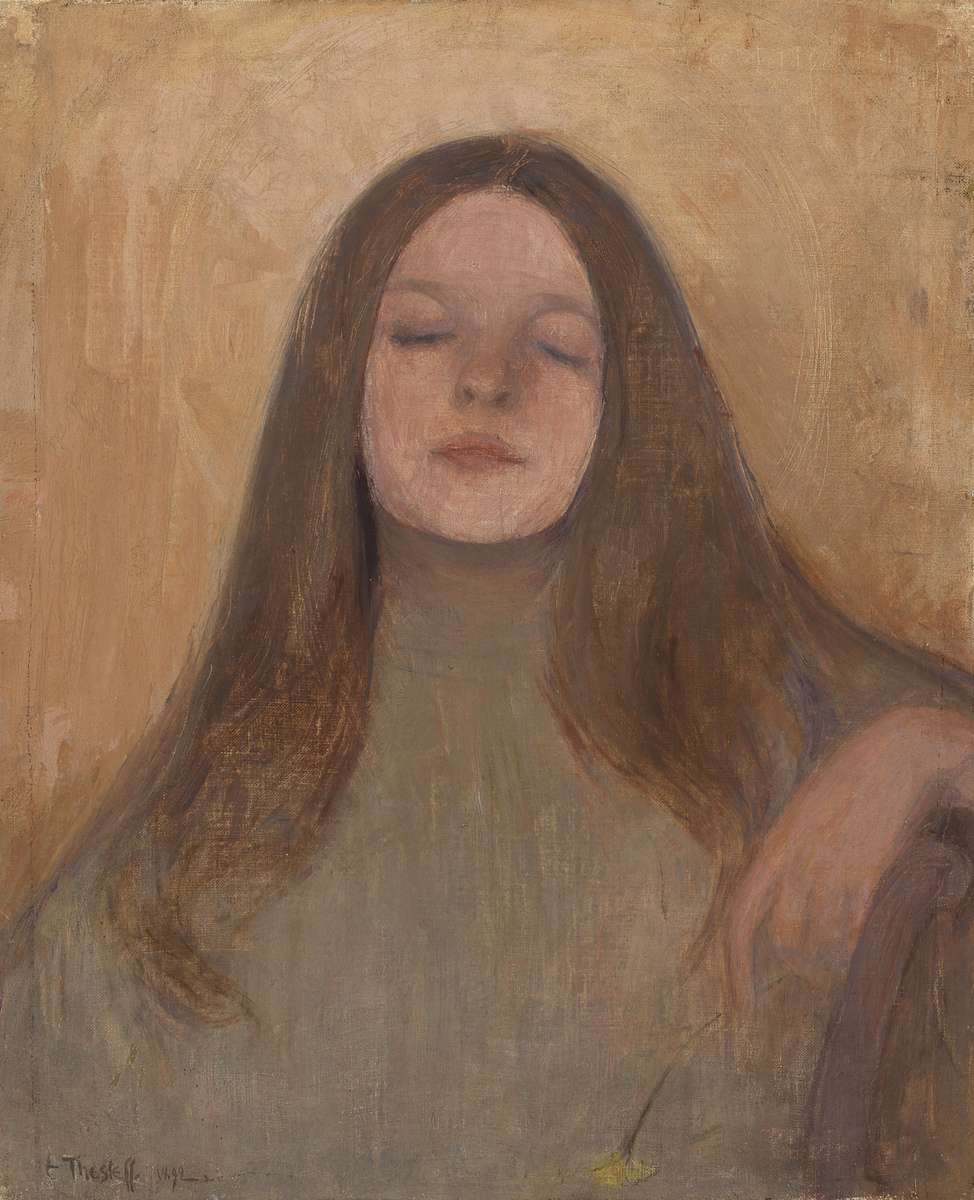
Thyra Elisabeth (1892)

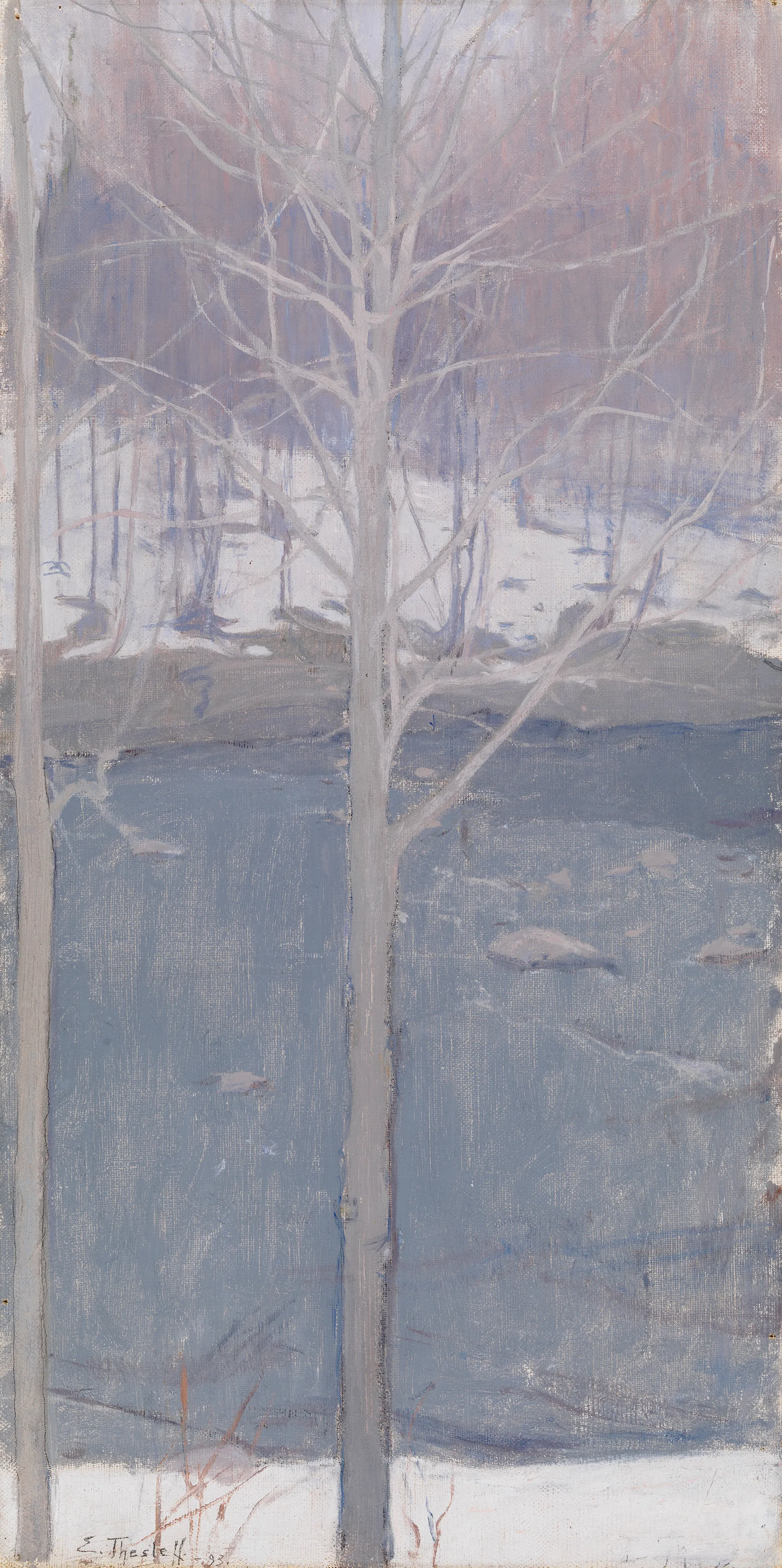
Aspens (1893)

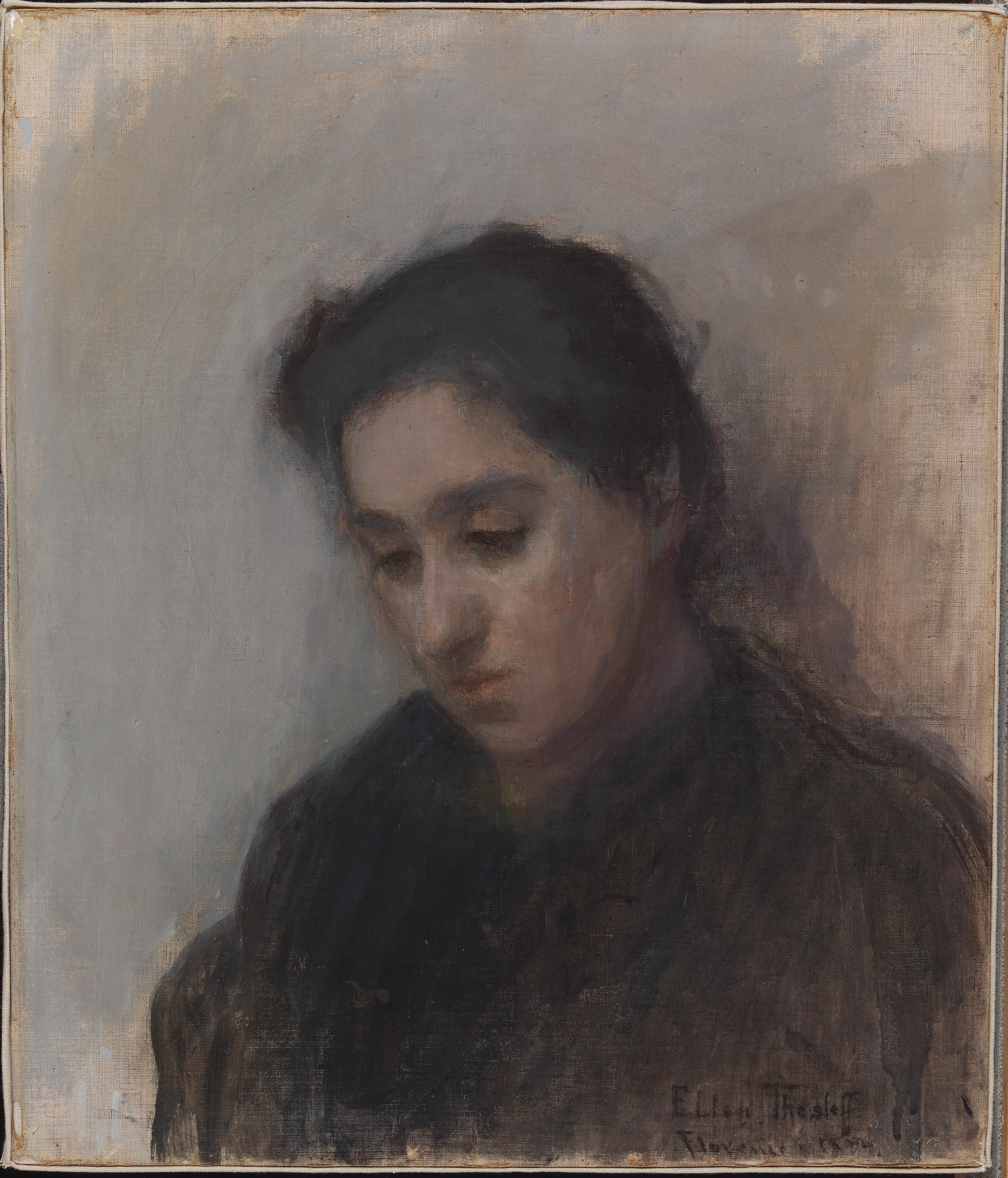
Ingeborg von Alfthan (1894)

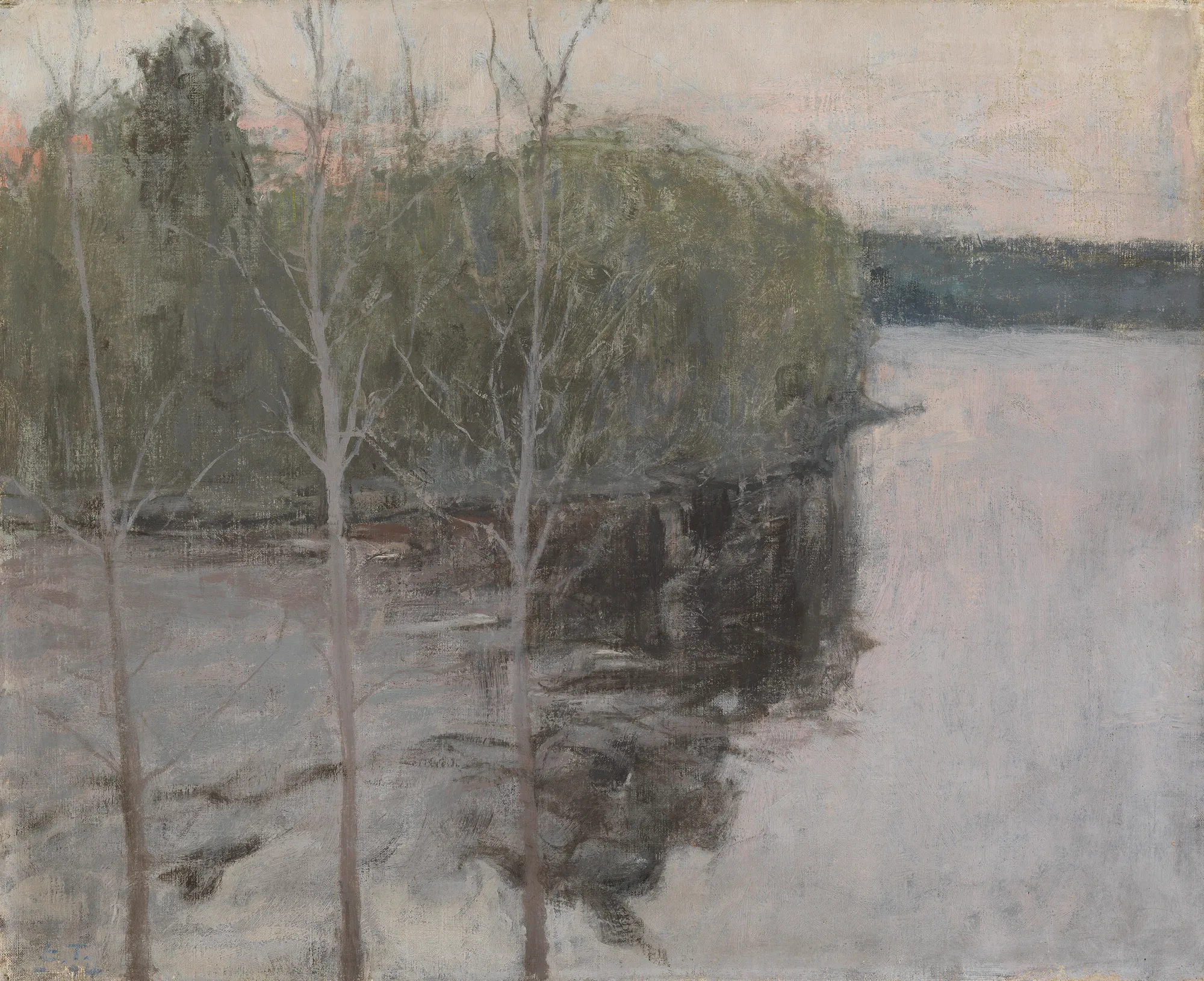
Spring Night (1894)
