= Beda Stjernschantz =

Finnish painter (1867–1910)

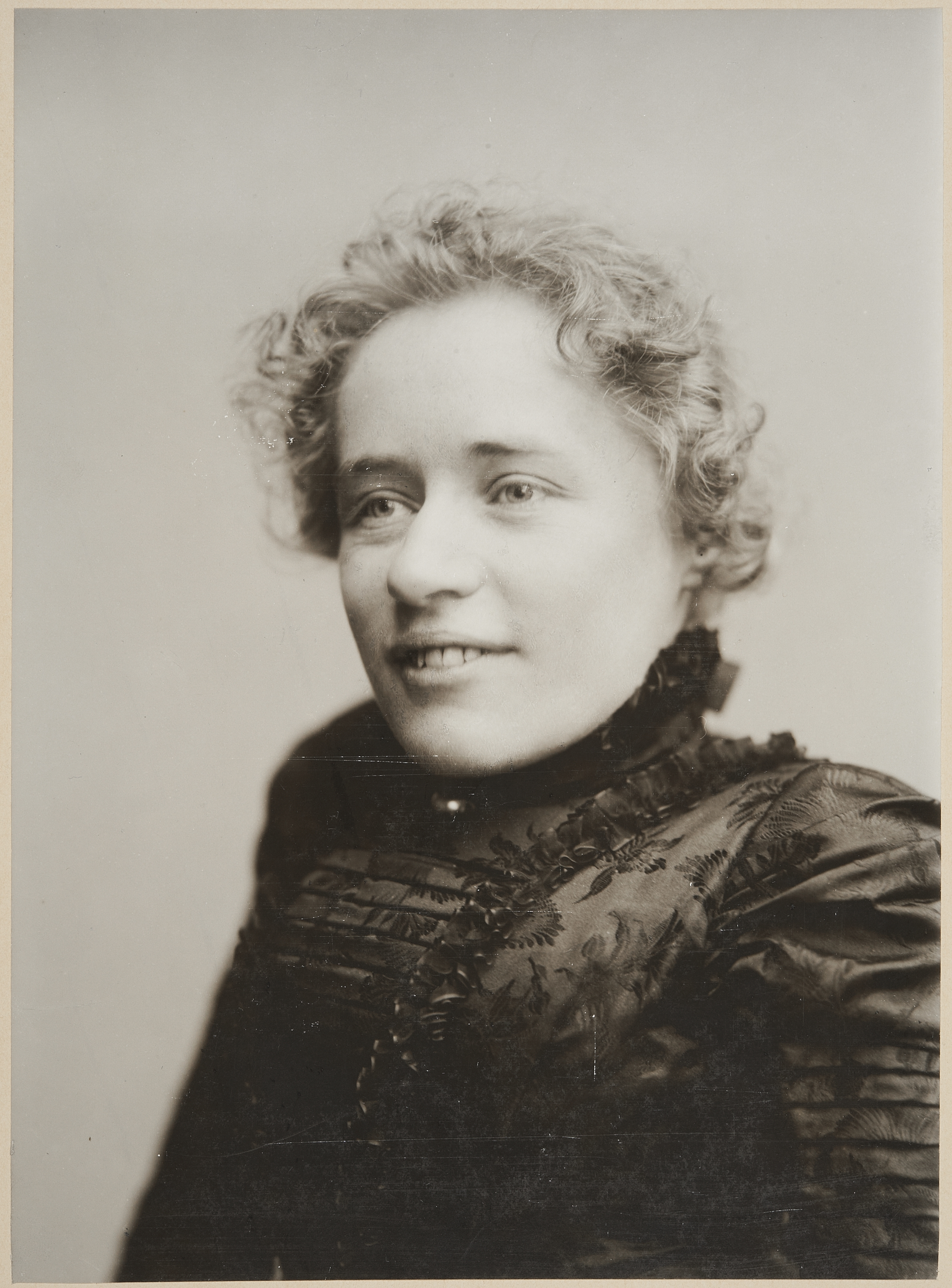
- Stjernschantz in the 1890s
- Born: 10 December 1867; Porvoo, Grand Duchy of Finland
- Died: 28 May 1910 (aged 42); Helsinki, Grand Duchy of Finland
- Movement: Symbolism

Beda Maria Stjernschantz (10 December 1867 – 28 May 1910) was one of the first Finnish symbolist painters, whose main creative period was during the 1890s' fin de siècle epoch.

Beda Stjernschantz was born in Porvoo to Johan Wilhelm Stjernschantz (né Blidberg) and his second wife Alma Charlotta née Sirén. Her father was a military officer and high ranking civil servant, who also held a seat in the Nobility Chamber of the Diet of Finland. The family was not particularly wealthy, however, which meant that Beda Stjernschantz had to largely support herself financially, including paying for her art studies.

Stjernschantz studied first at the Drawing School of the Academy of Fine Arts, Helsinki, from 1885 to 1889, and later privately under Gunnar Berndtson, from 1889 to 1891. She started out as a realist, but soon after her debut exhibition in 1891, and her subsequent visit to Paris the following year, began shifting increasingly towards symbolism. After selling her paintings at an auction, Stjernschantz traveled to New York, U.S., where she lived from 1903 to 1905, working as a private tutor and nanny.

In her time, Stjernschantz was not very highly regarded and, despite her relatively privileged background, struggled throughout her career with financial problems and various external pressures, isolation, as well as artistic belittling; the resulting persistent 'melancholy' eventually lead her to take her own life in 1910, at the age of 42. Due to her early death, her artistic output remains relatively small.

Stjernschantz's only known international exhibition took place in Paris, in 1900. Several of her works are now in the permanent collection of the Finnish National Gallery.

Stjernschantz is today regarded as a pioneer of the symbolism movement in Finland, and one of the leading artists of her time.

== Gallery ==
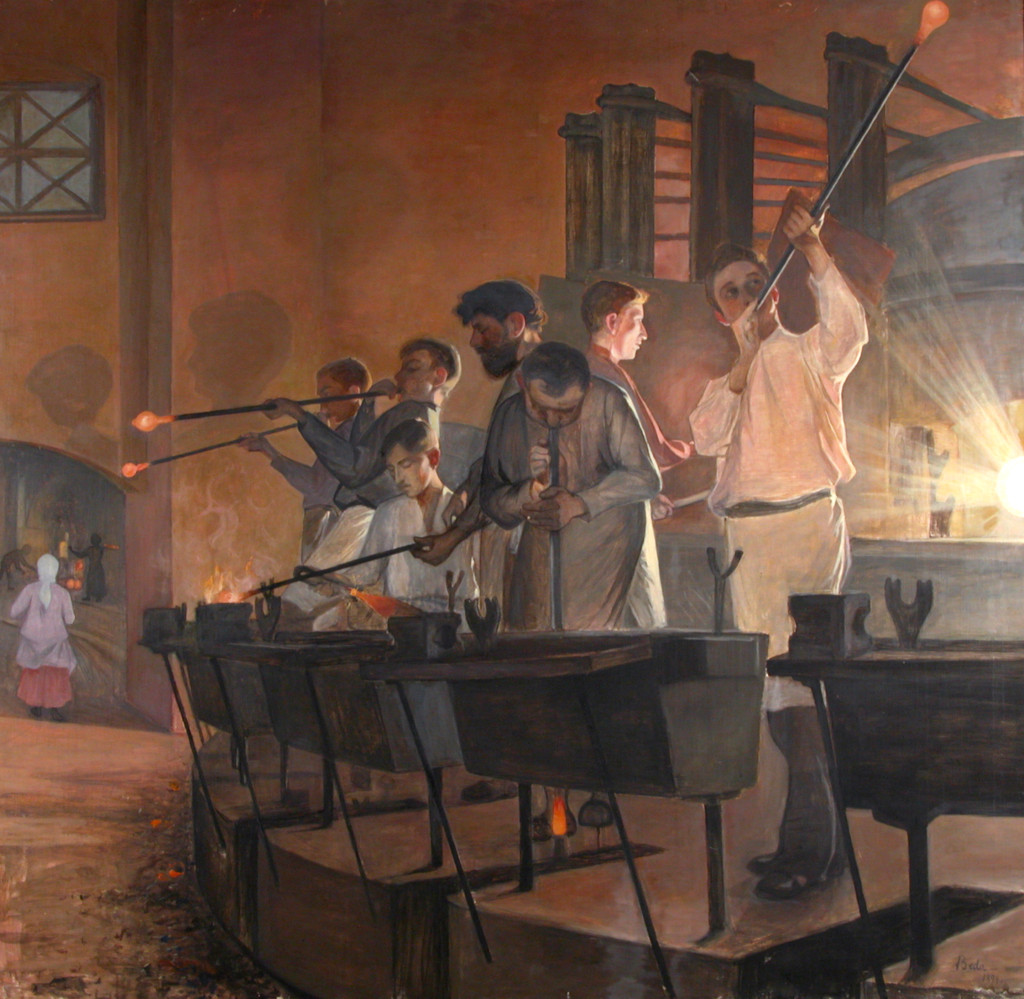
Lasinpuhaltajat (1894)

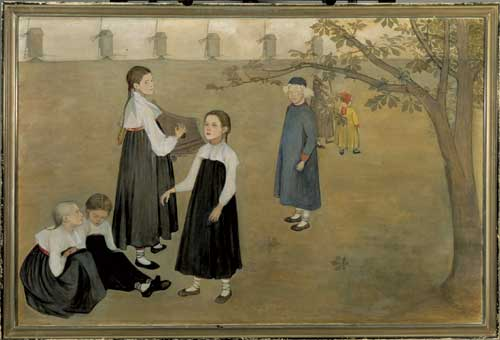
Kaikkialla ääni kaikuu (1895)

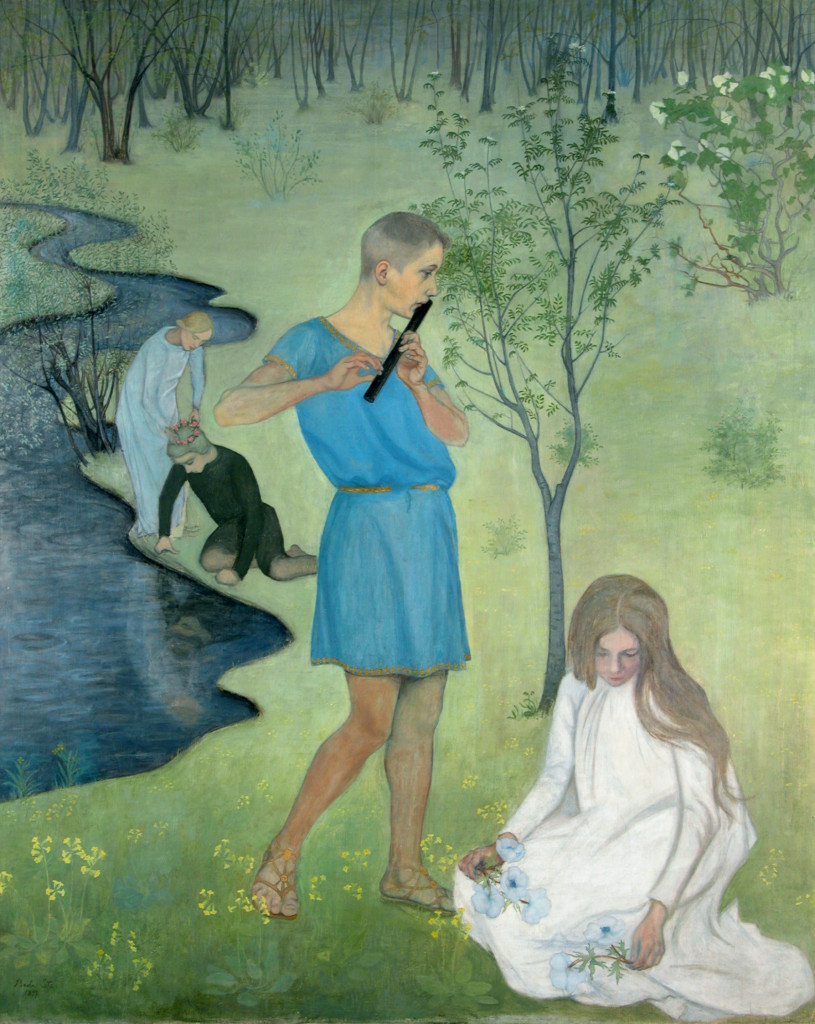
Pastoraali (1897)
