= Ellen Thesleff =

Finnish painter (1869–1954)

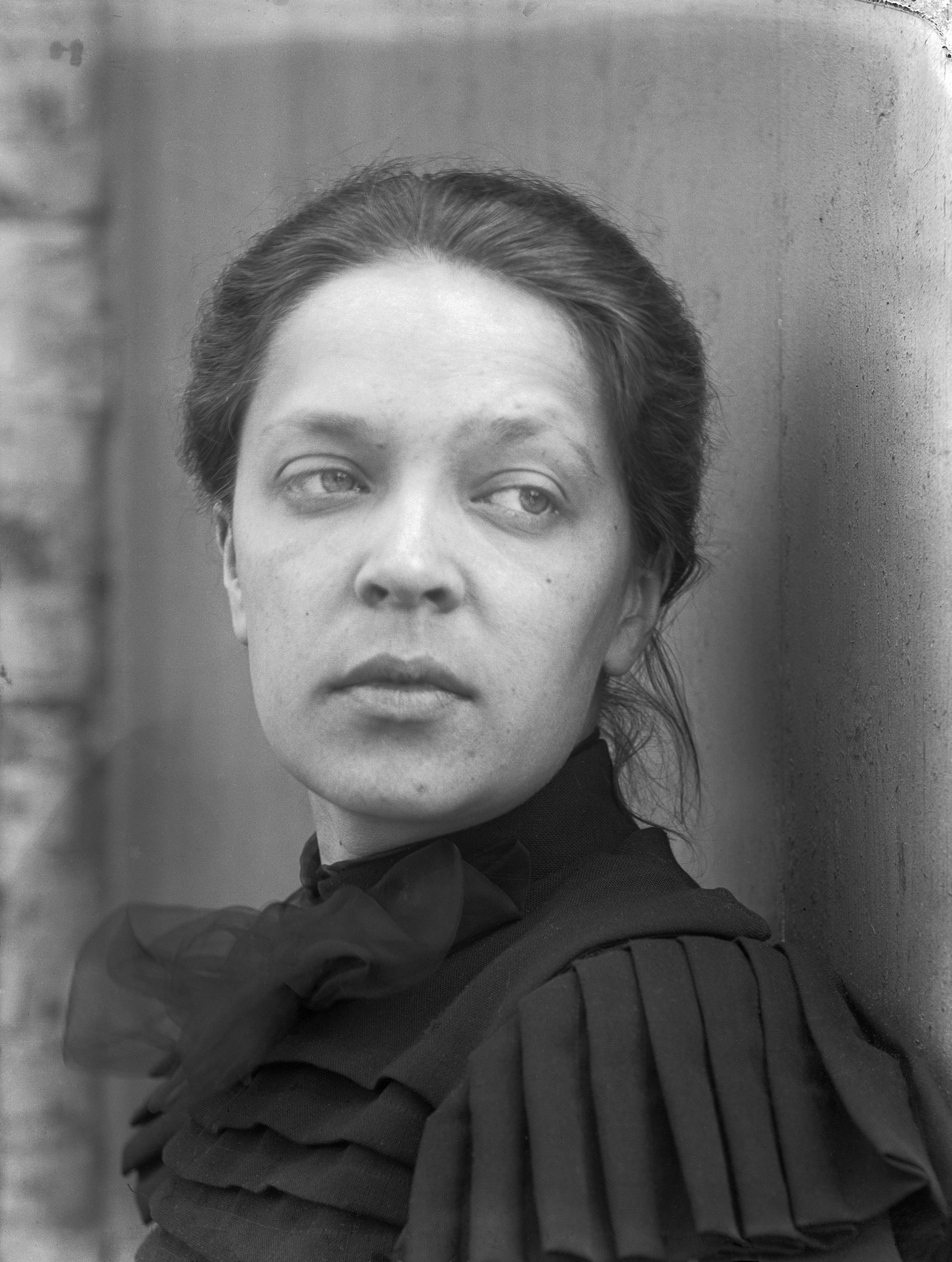
- Ellen Thesleff in 1890
- Born: 5 October 1869; Helsinki, Finland
- Died: 12 January 1954 (aged 84)
- Education: Finnish Art Society; Académie Colarossi
- Style: painter
- Movement: Symbolism Expressionism Modernism

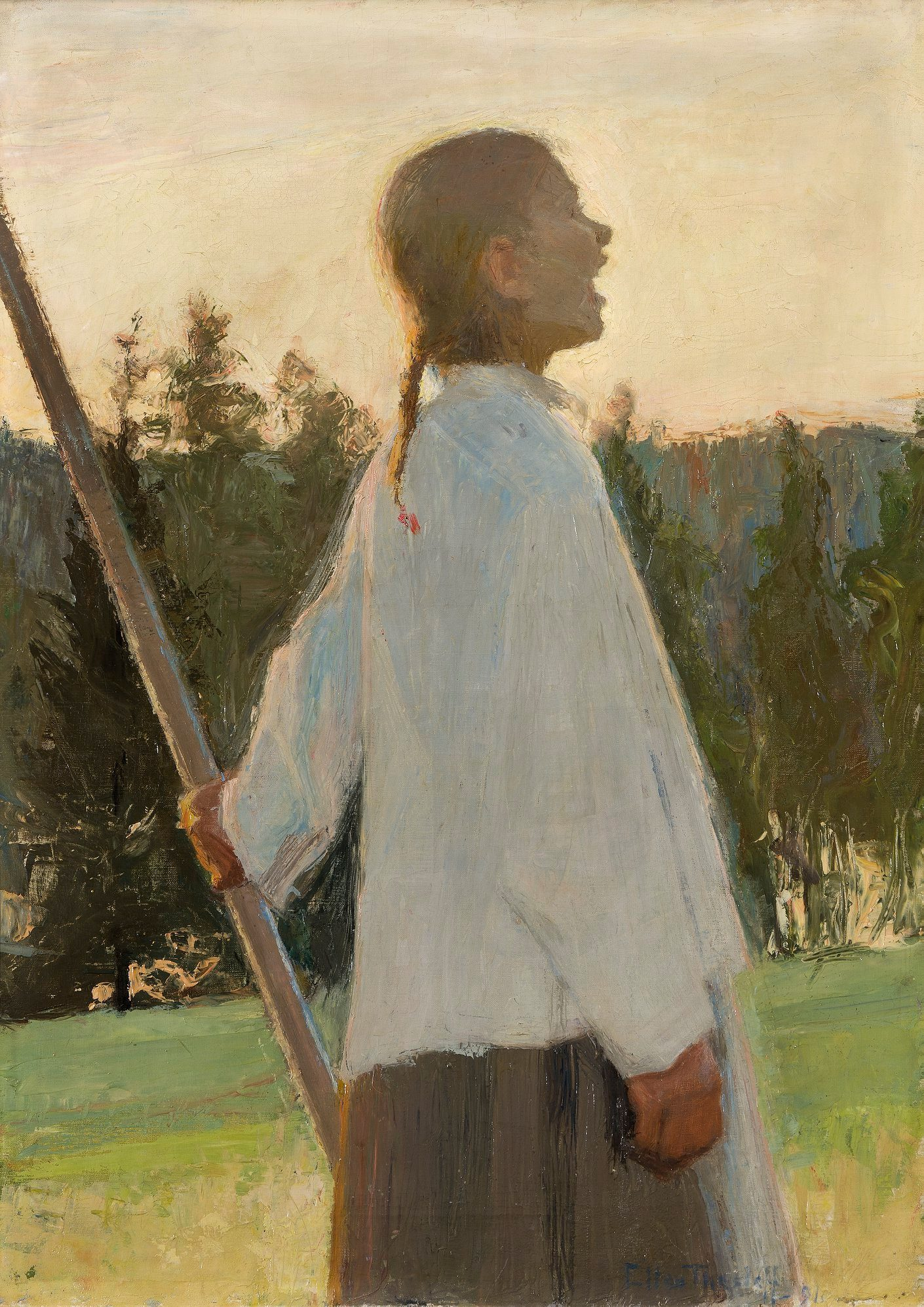
"Echo" (1891)

Ellen Thesleff (5 October 1869 – 12 January 1954) was a Finnish expressionist painter, regarded as one of the leading Finnish modernist painters.

== Biography ==
Thesleff was born in Helsinki, the eldest daughter of five siblings and her father was an amateur painter. She took private lessons and then, in 1887, studied for two years at the Finnish Art Society Drawing School (now known as the Finnish Academy of Fine Arts) with Gunnar Berndtson. In 1891, Thesleff moved to Paris and enrolled into Académie Colarossi.

Thesleff spent all of her life in Finland, France, and Italy, visiting Italy first in 1894. In Finland, she had a family estate at Murole, Ruovesi. She never married. Thesleff took part in many big exhibitions in the 20th century; in particular, in 1949 her paintings were on display in a large exhibition of Nordic art in Copenhagen and were praised by the media.

At the beginning of her career, Thesleff worked on symbolist paintings in the style similar to Eugène Carrière, though she insisted she was most influenced by Édouard Manet. Later, she moved to expressionism and modernism, most notably landscapes.

Thesleff was included in the 2018 exhibit Women in Paris 1850-1900.

== See also ==
- Self-Portrait (Ellen Thesleff)
