= Gunnar Berndtson =

Finnish painter (1854–1895)

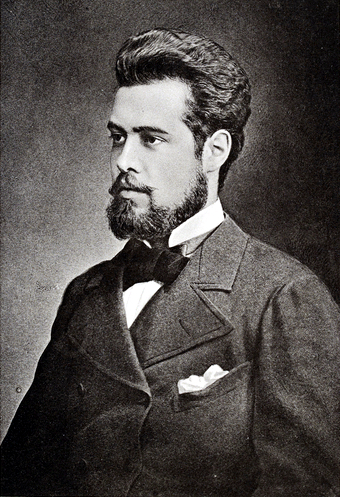
- Portrait photograph, 1880s
- Born: Gunnar Fredrik Berndtson; 24 October 1854; Helsinki, Grand Duchy of Finland
- Died: 9 April 1895 (aged 40); Helsinki, Grand Duchy of Finland
- Known for: Painting

Gunnar Fredrik Berndtson (24 October 1854, Helsinki – 9 April 1895, Helsinki) was a painter from the Grand Duchy of Finland who was noted for his attention to realistic detail.

== Biography ==
His father was Fredrik Berndtson, a well-known author, journalist and poet. He began his higher studies at the Polytechnic Institute (now the Helsinki University of Technology). Since 1869, however, he had been associating with members of the Academy of Fine Arts and was auditing art classes at the University of Helsinki taught by Erik Johan Löfgren and others.

By 1876, he had made the decision to be an artist, so he went to Paris, where he enrolled at the École des Beaux-Arts and studied under Jean-Léon Gérôme. He remained there until 1882. During his stay, he became part of a group centered around Albert Edelfelt (they had been friends since youth) and was influenced by the Salon style of painting. His first exhibit at the Salon came in 1878.

From 1882 to 1883, he visited Egypt as the guest of Alphonse, Baron Delort de Gléon (1843-1899), a mining engineer. He settled in the French community there, painting portraits and providing illustrations, as a correspondent, for Le Monde illustré. Three years after his return to Finland, he got married. In 1889, he received the State Prize for portrait painting.

He frequently returned to Paris to exhibit at the Salon, where he had always had his greatest successes. From 1890 to 1892, he was a teacher at the Academy of Fine Arts, where Magnus Enckell was among his best-known students. Others included Ellen Thesleff and Beda Stjernschantz.

Berndtson died in 1895 of a "degenerative ailment"; possibly syphilis. He is buried in the Hietaniemi Cemetery in Helsinki.

== Works ==
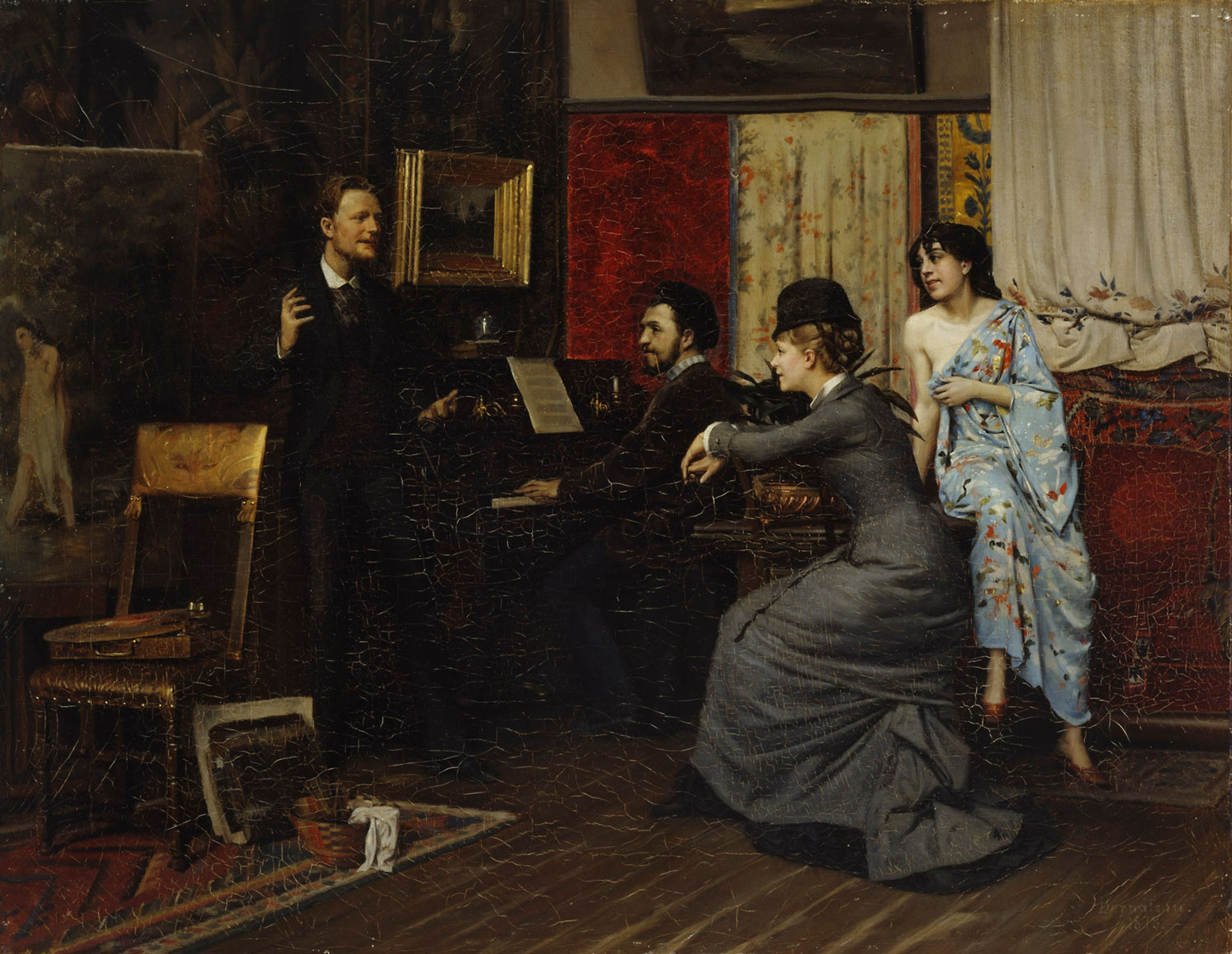
Music in the Studio, 1878

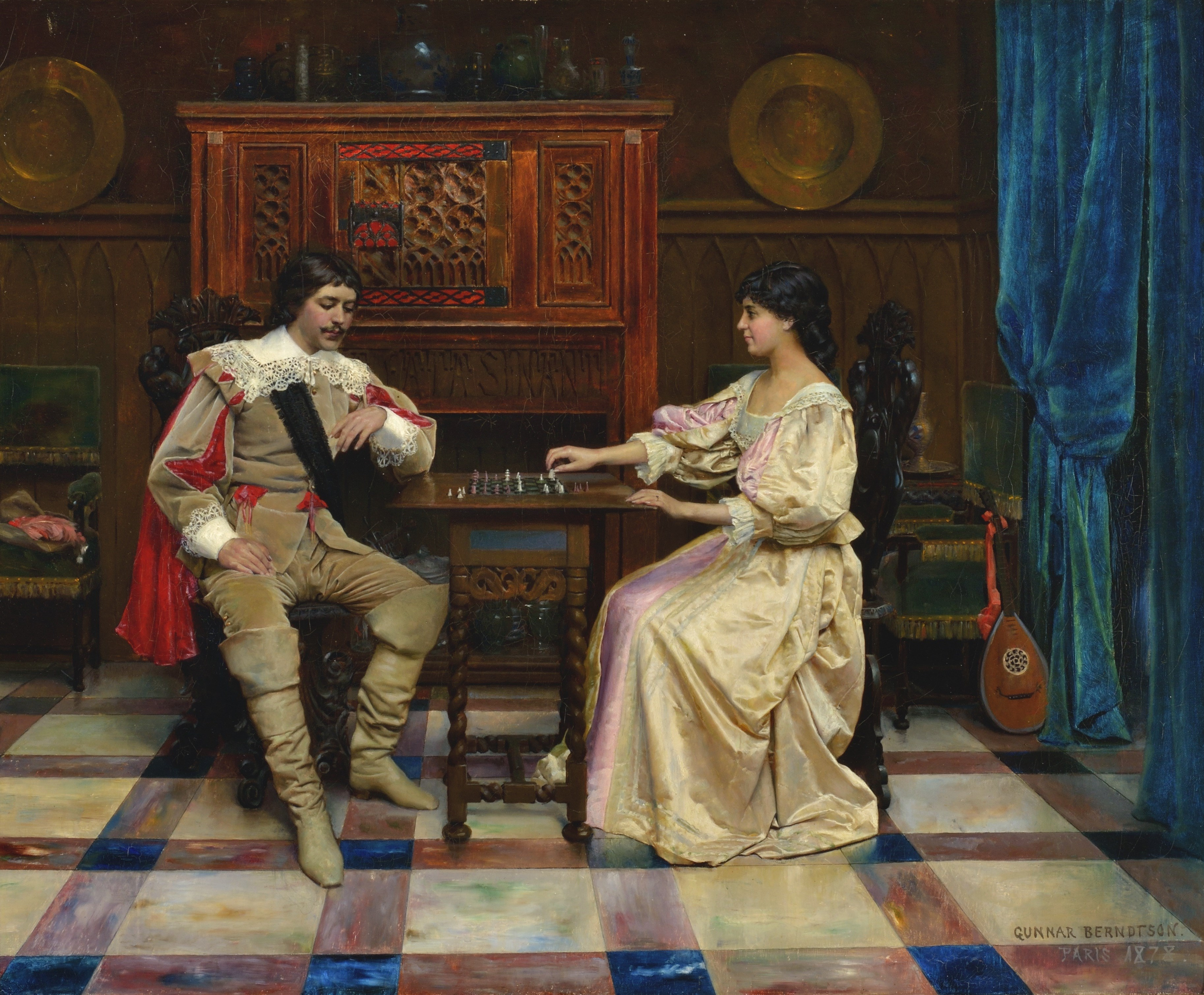
Chess Players, 1878

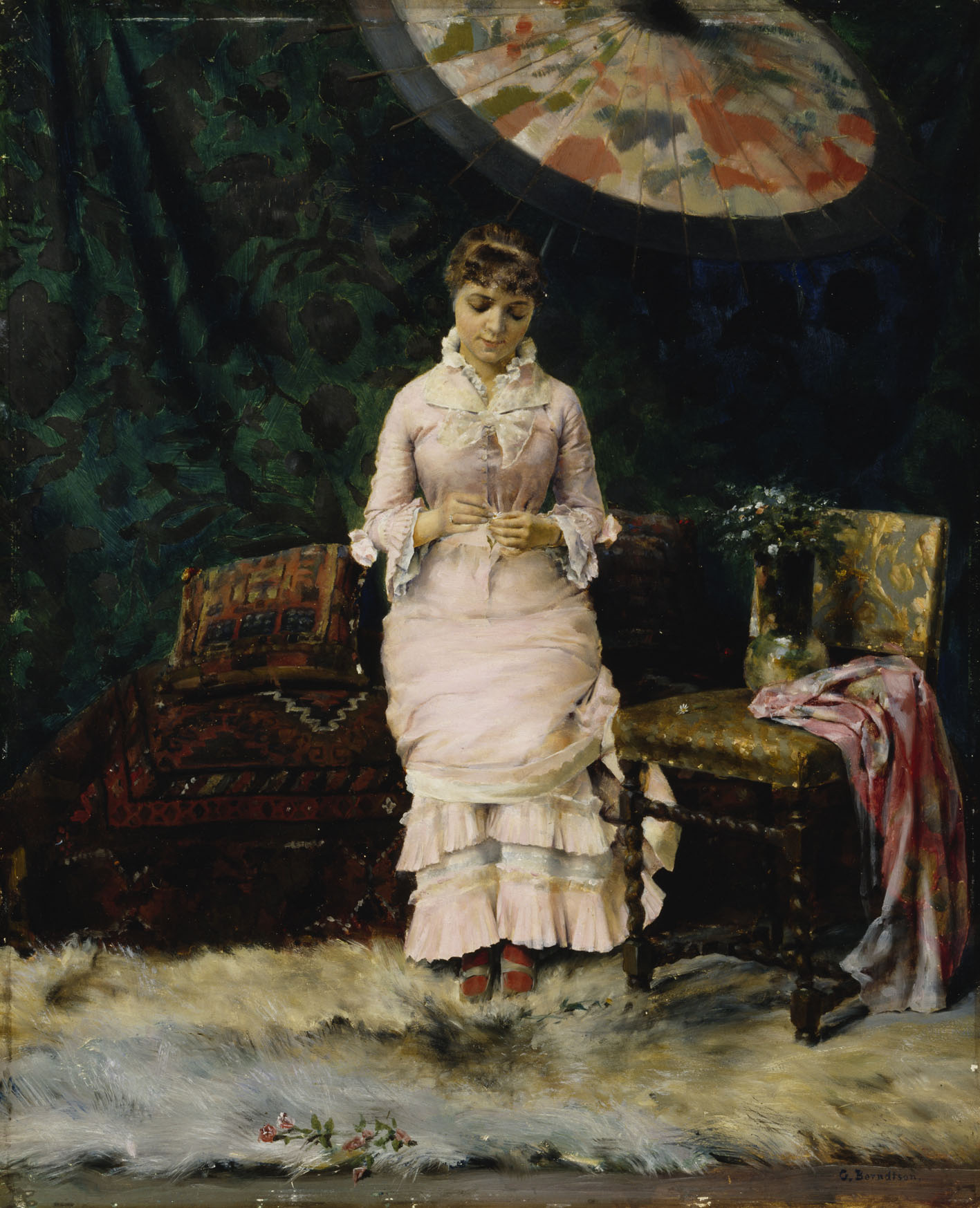
Yes - No, Pause in the Studio, 1879

Art Connoisseurs in the Louvre, 1879

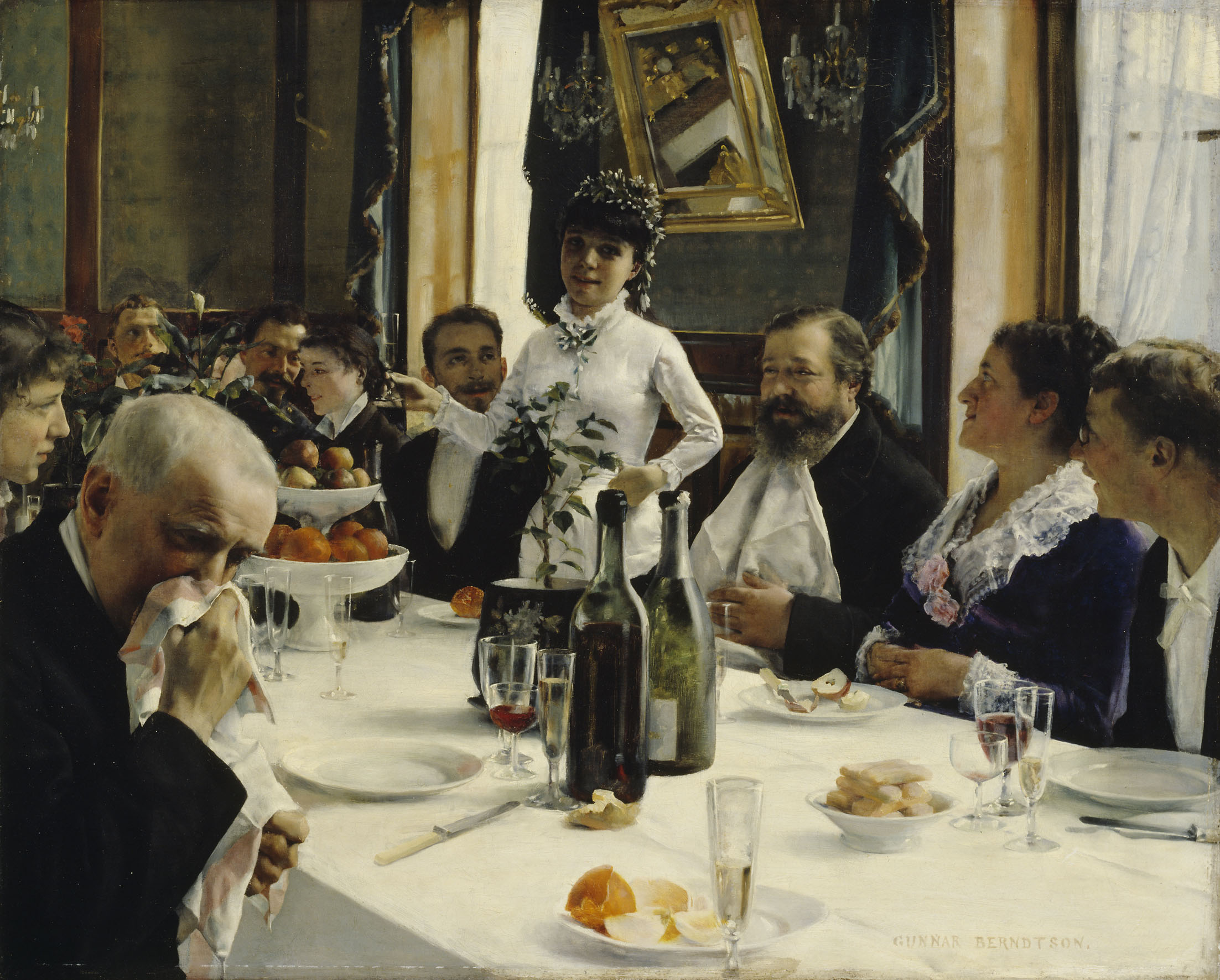
The Bride's Song, 1881

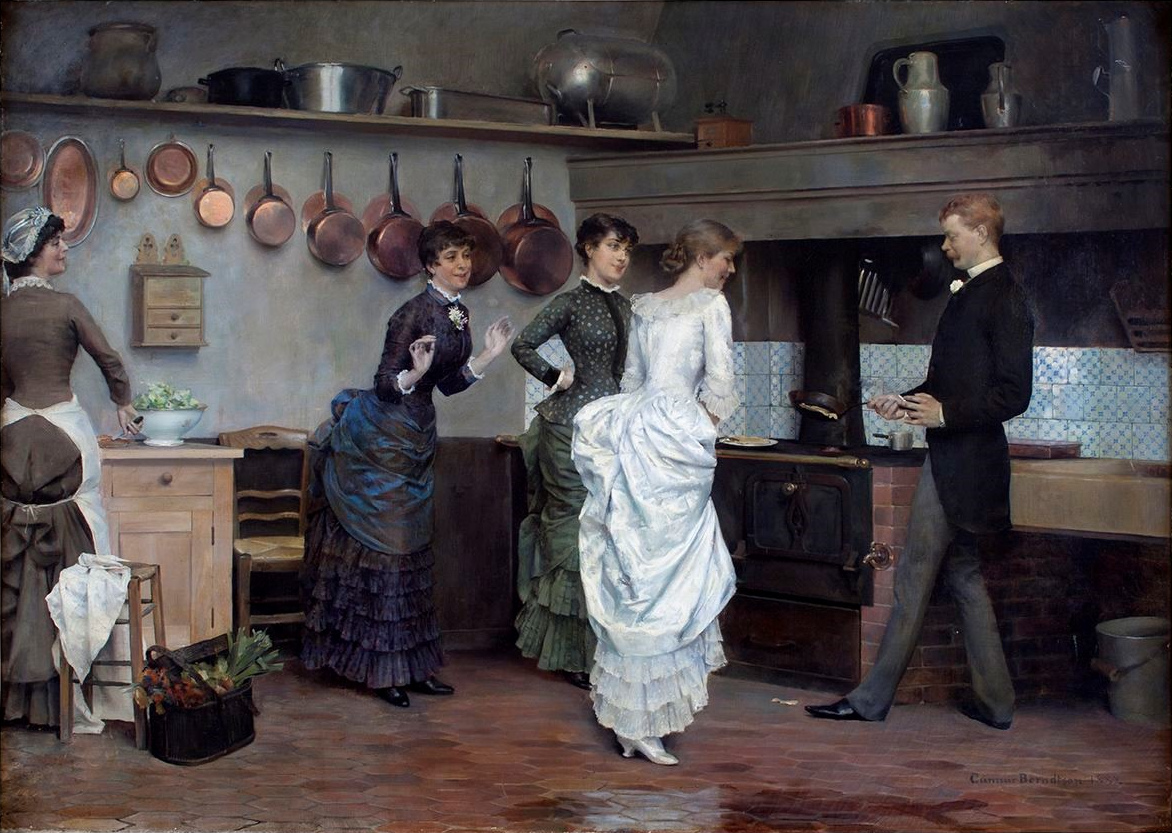
Laskiaistiistai, 1882

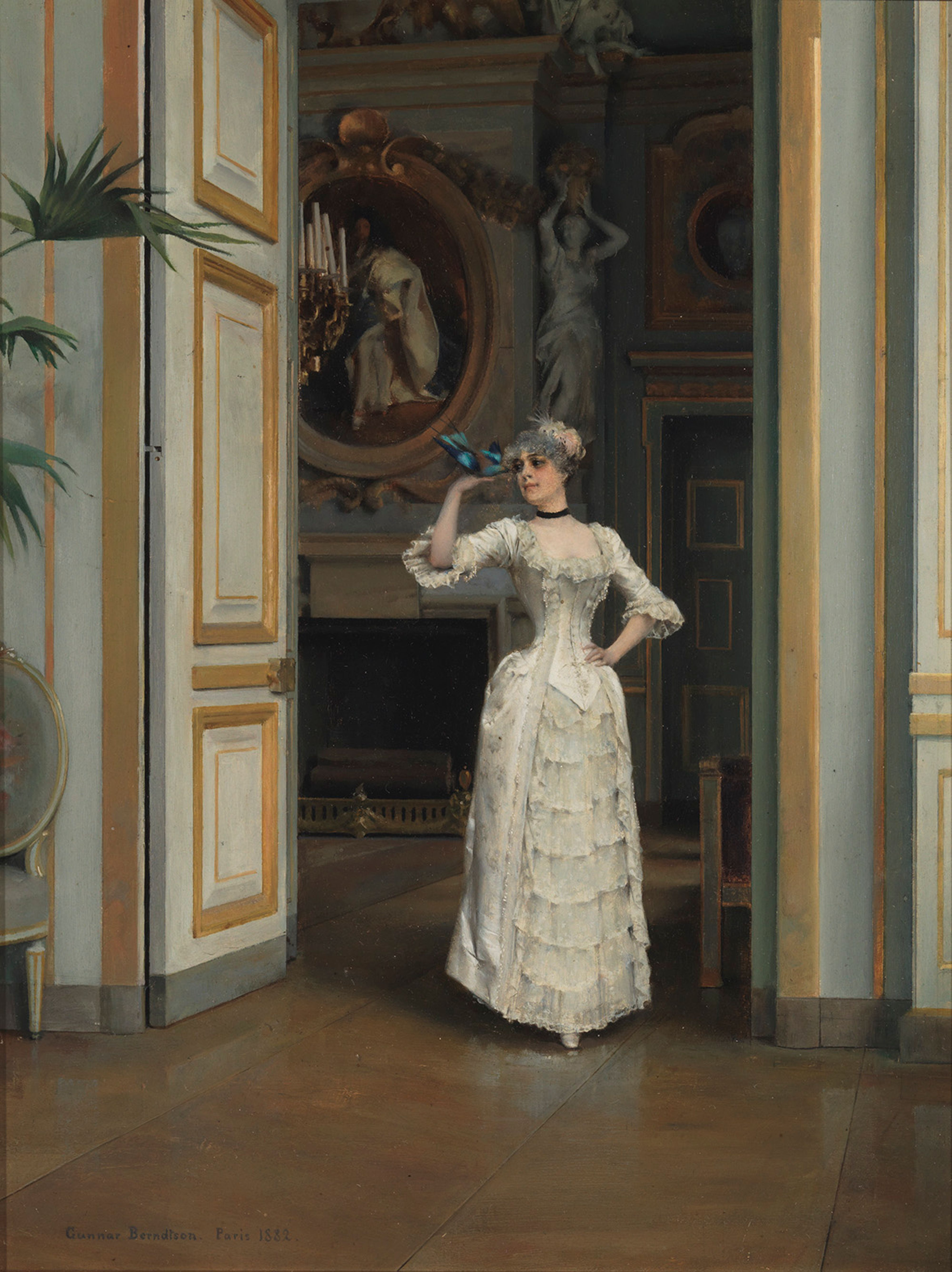
Woman with a Bird at the Castle of Maison Laffitte, 1882

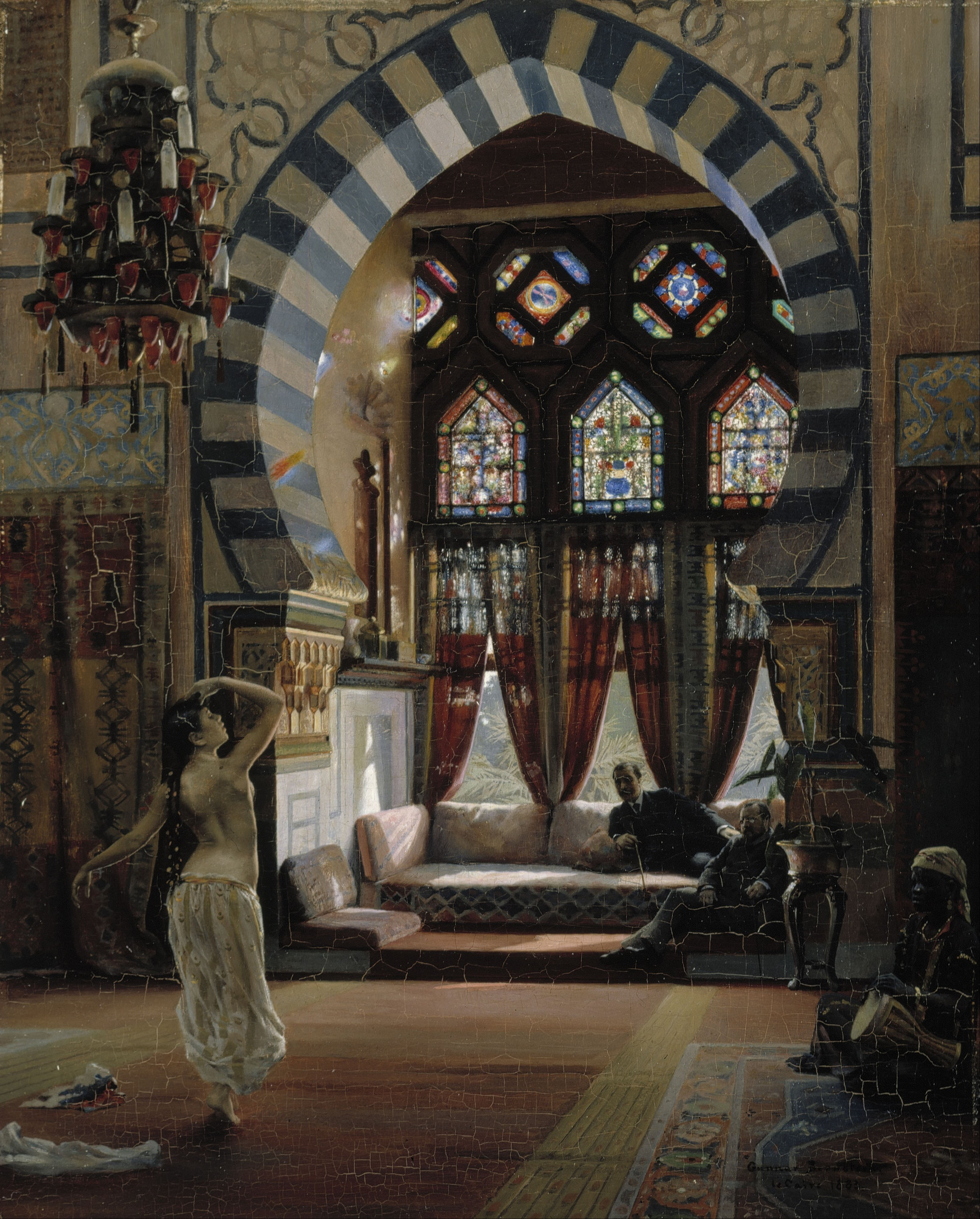
Almée, an Egyptian Dancer, 1883

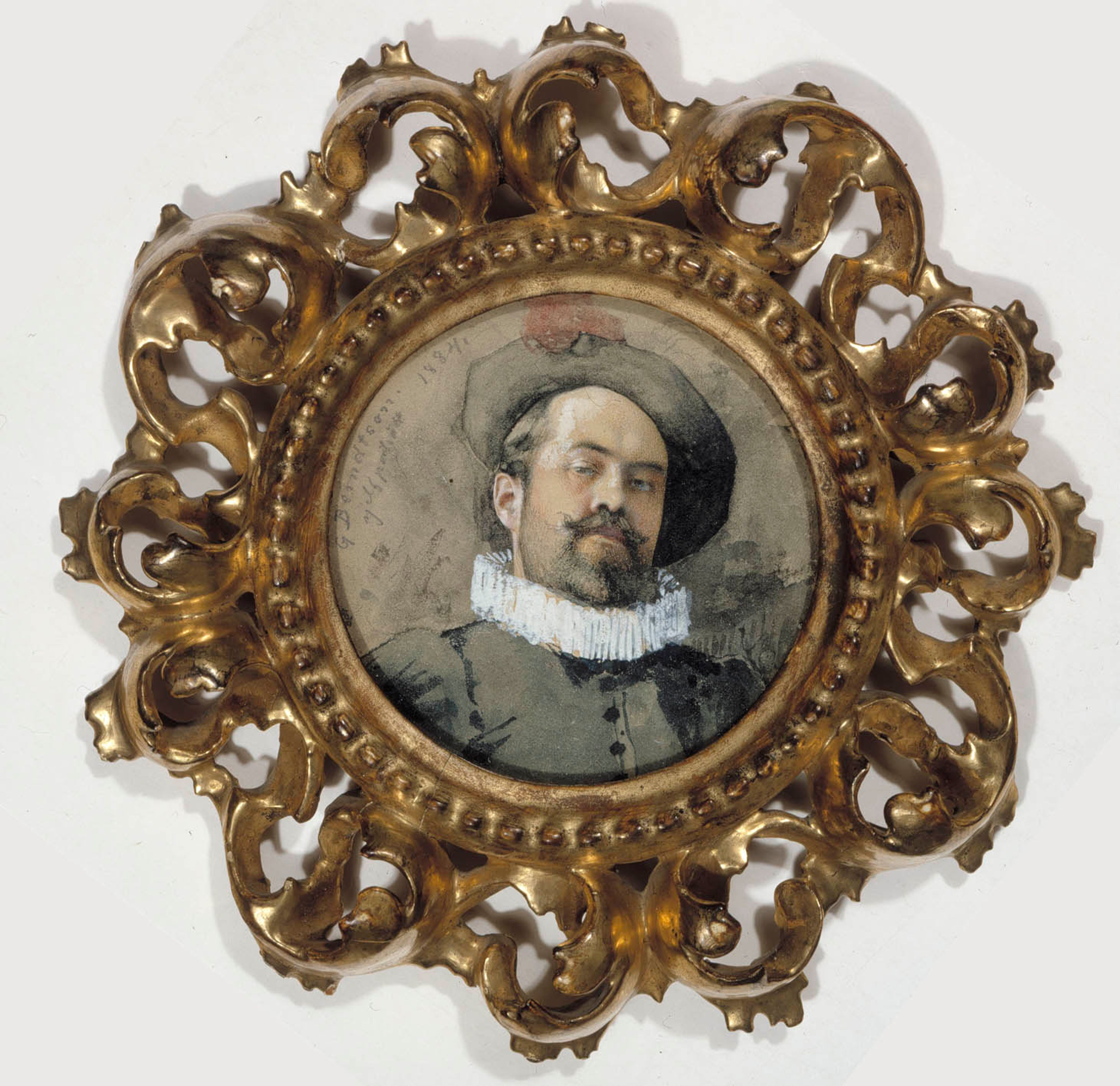
Self-portrait in a 17th century outfit, 1884

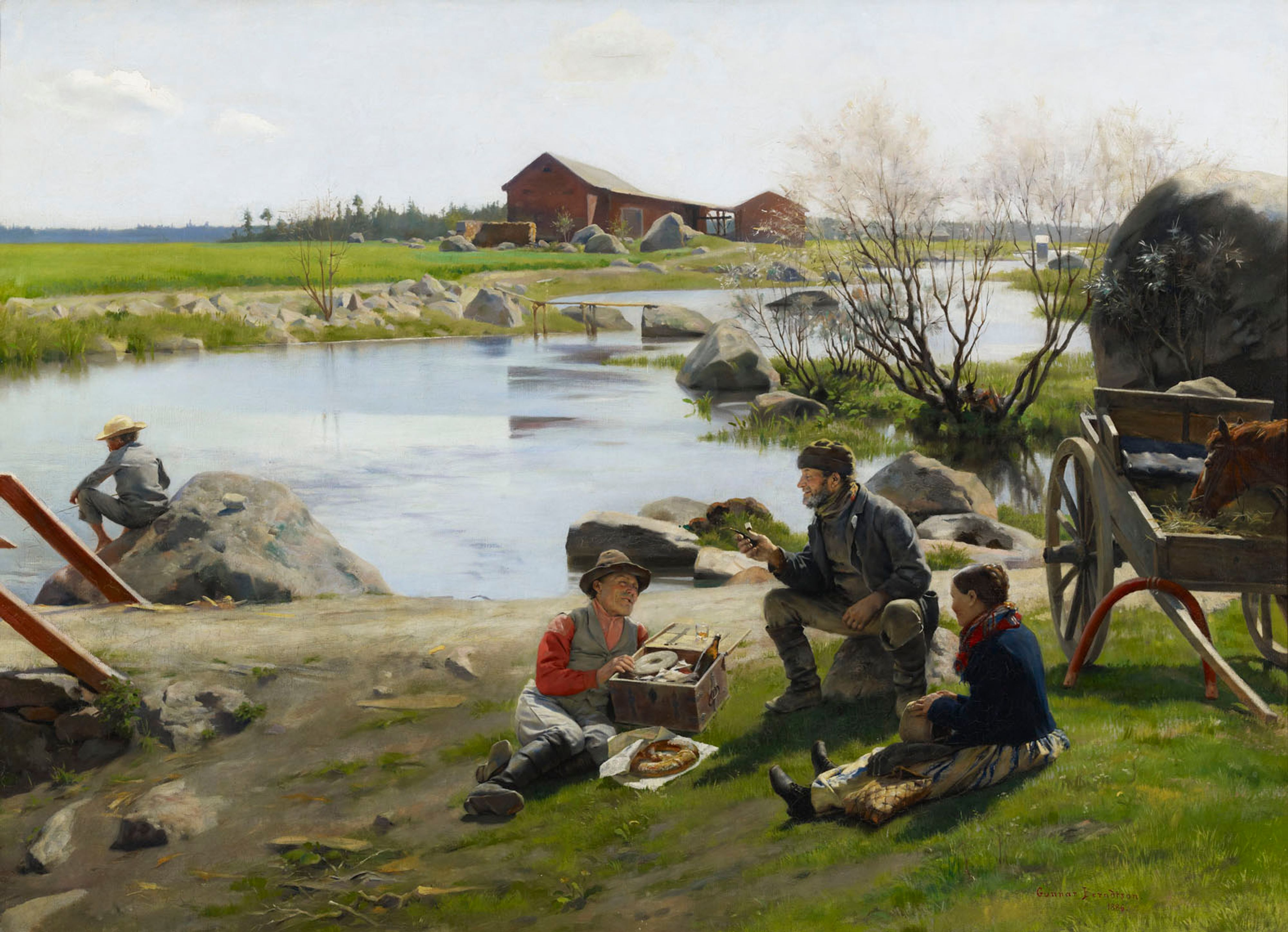
A Rest on the Way to the Fair, 1886

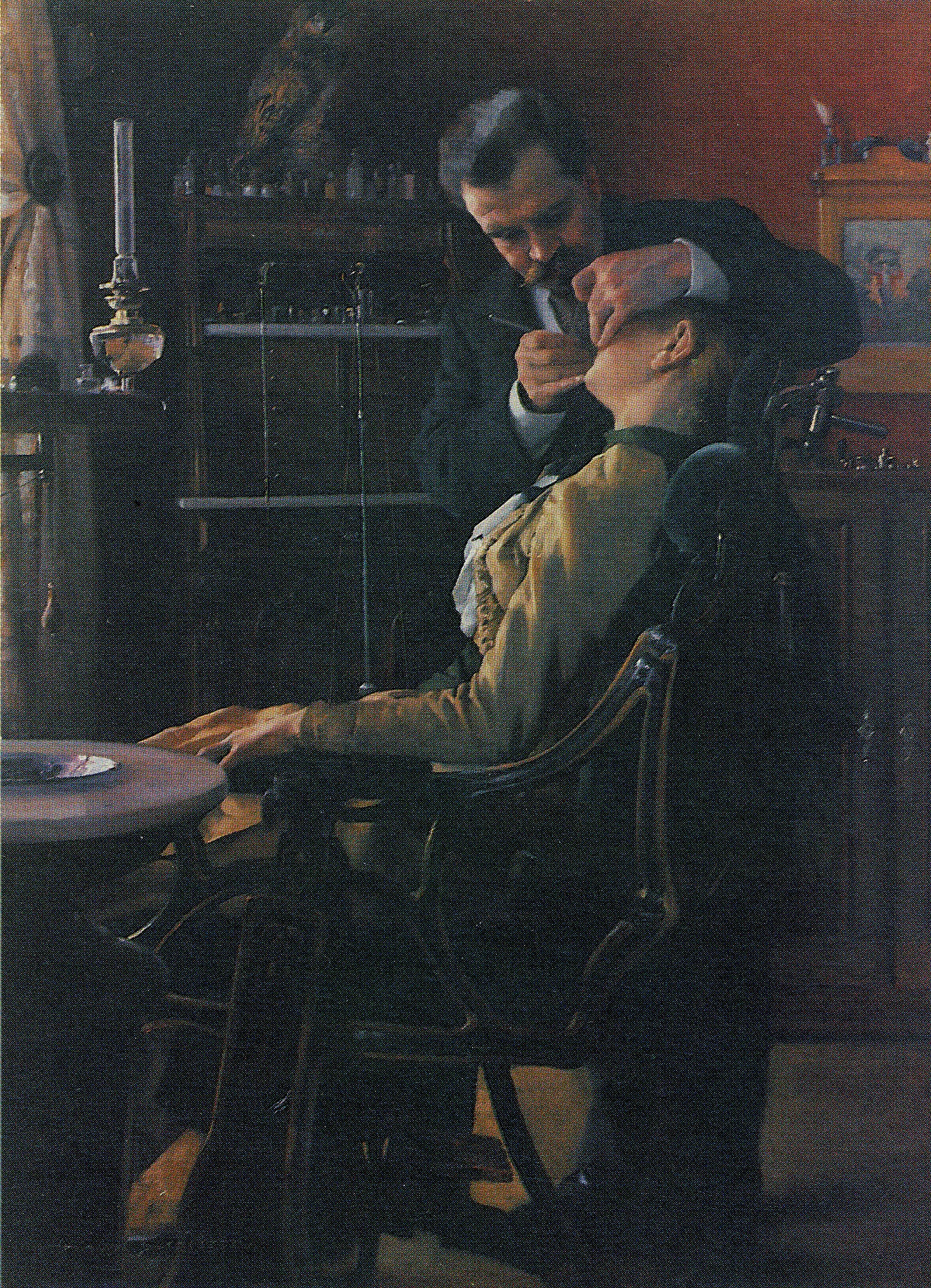
Portrait of Dentistry Professor Matti Äyräpää, 1889

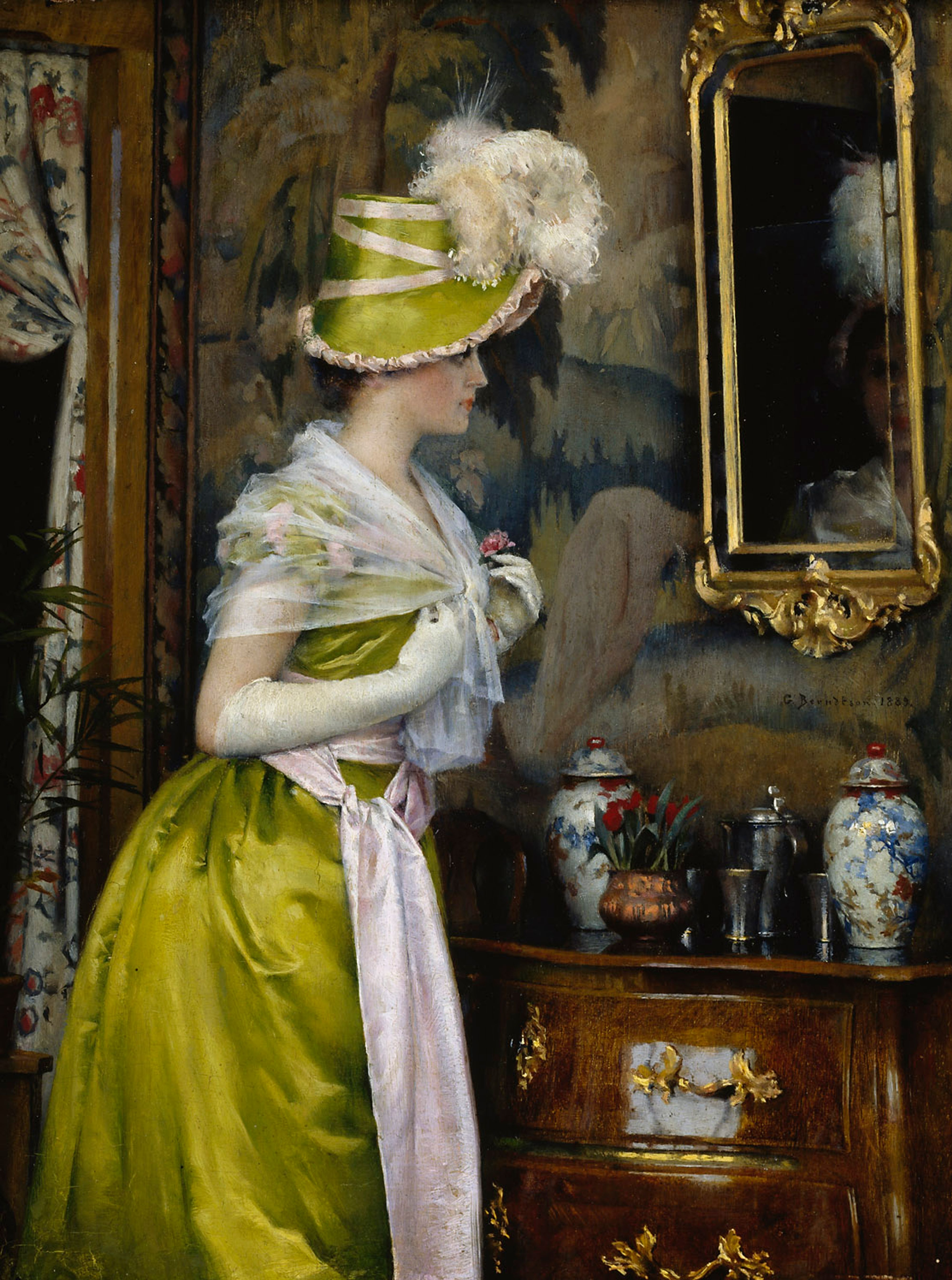
The Mirror, 1889

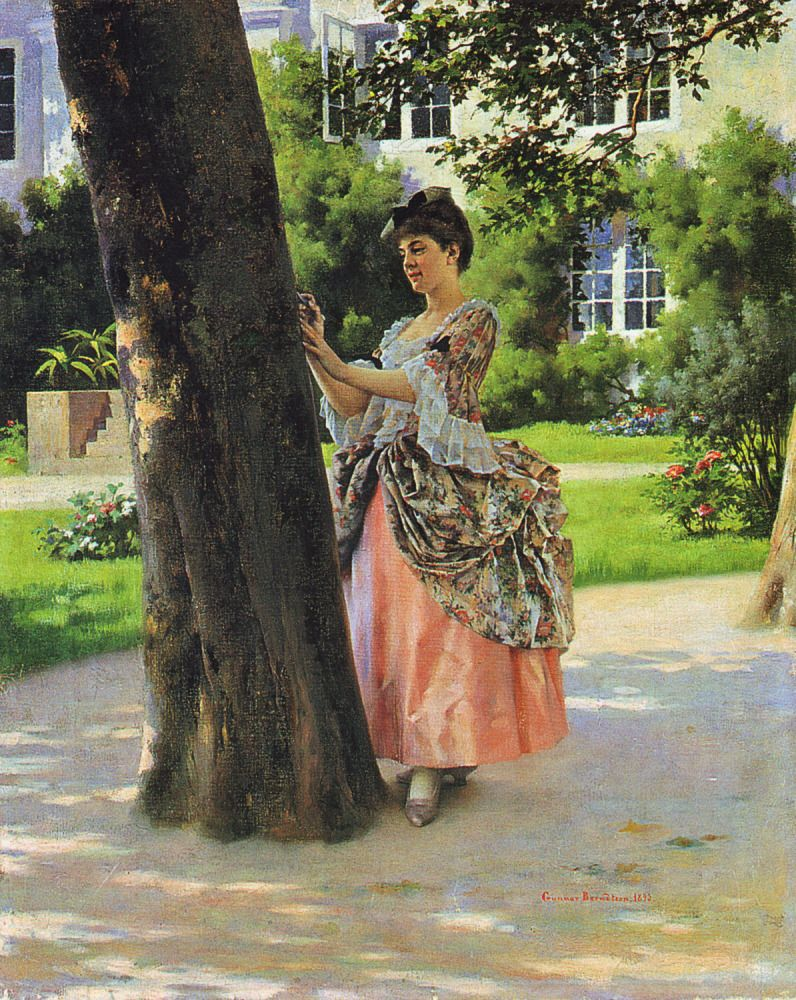
His Name, 1890

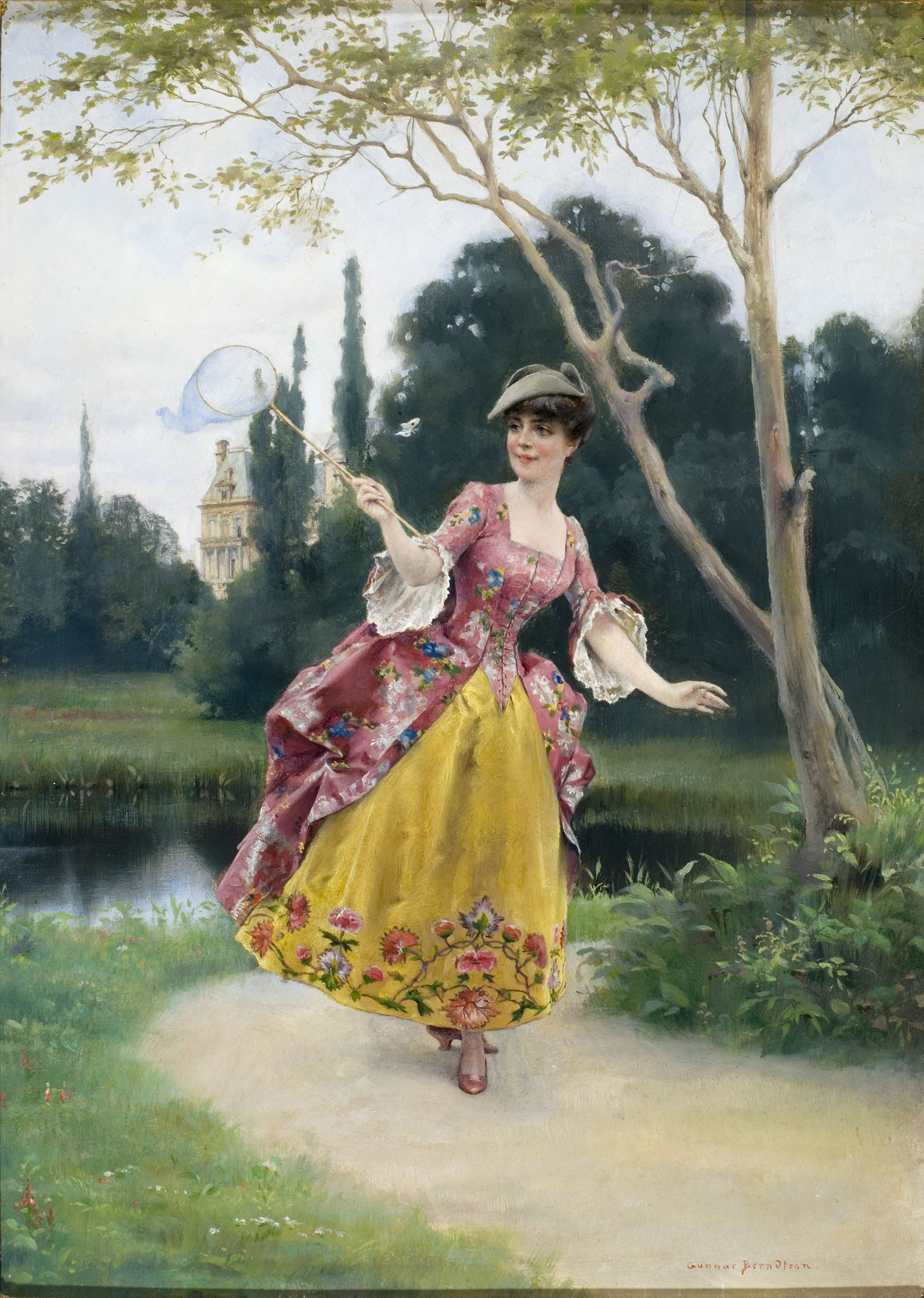
Garden Idyll, unknown date

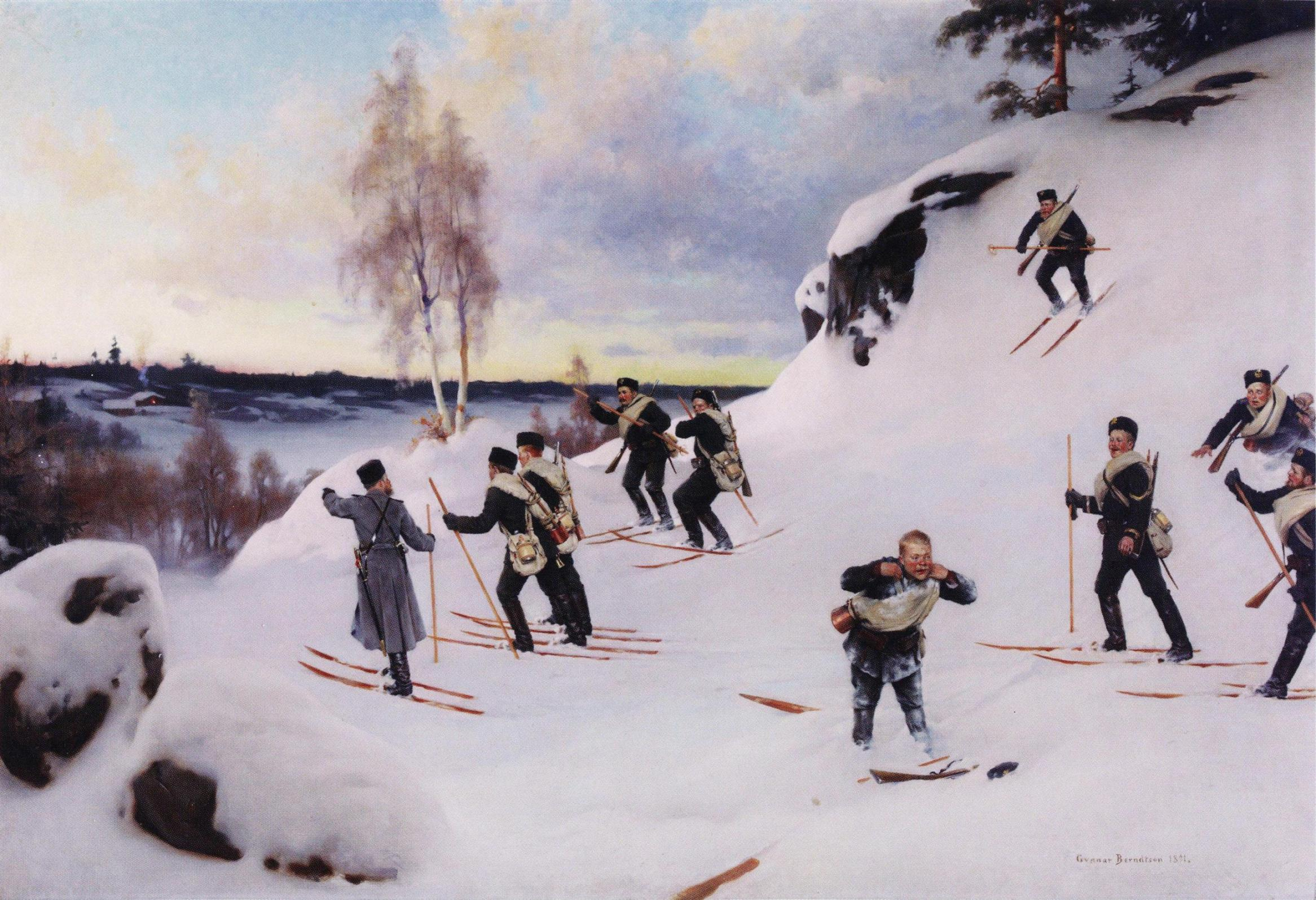
Ski Patrol, 1891

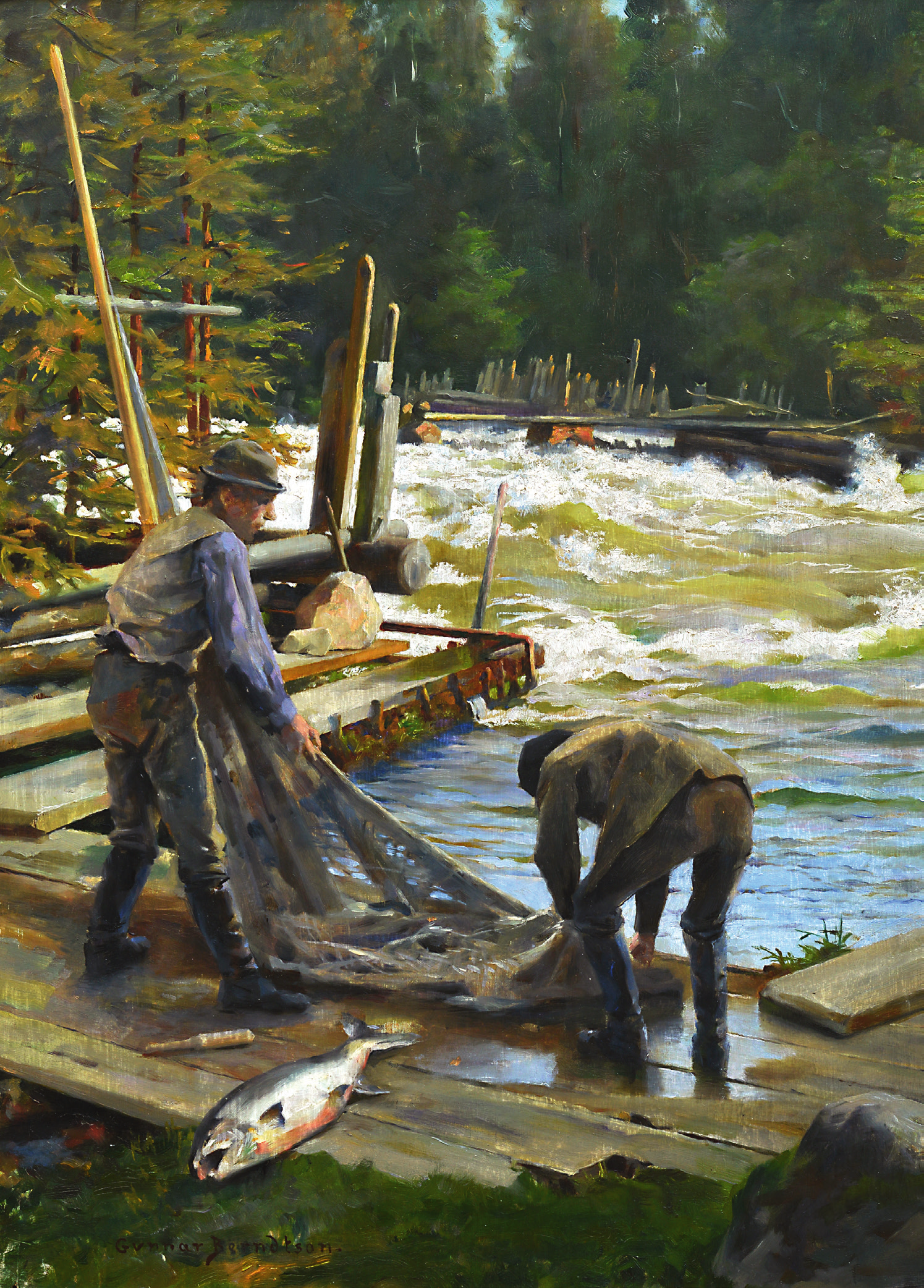
Salmon Fishers at the Langinkoski Rapid, 1892

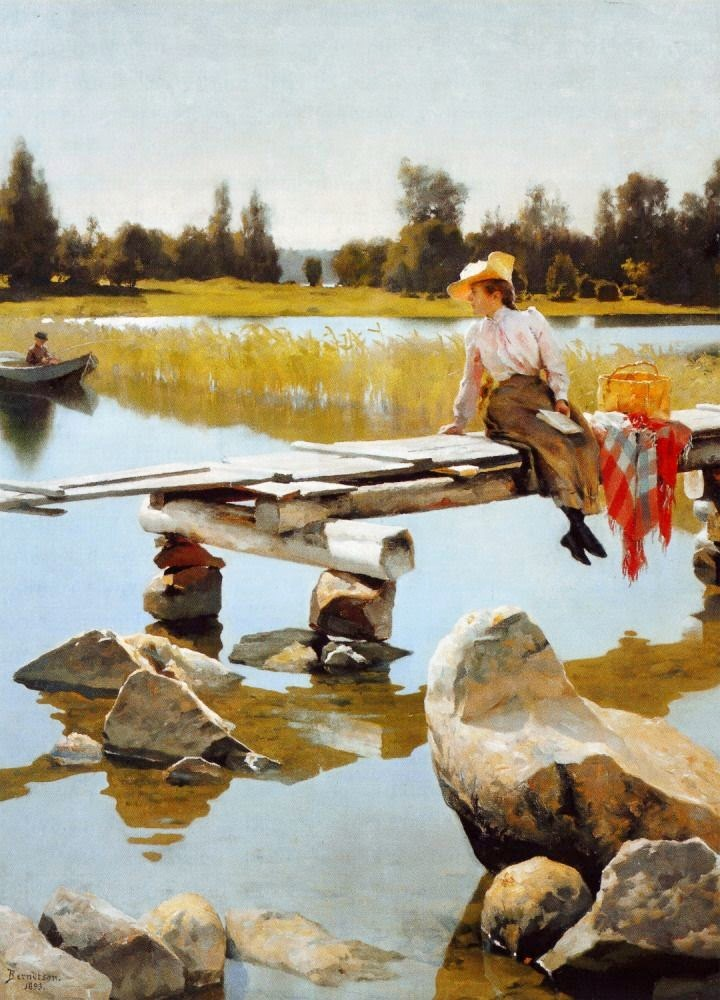
Summer, 1893

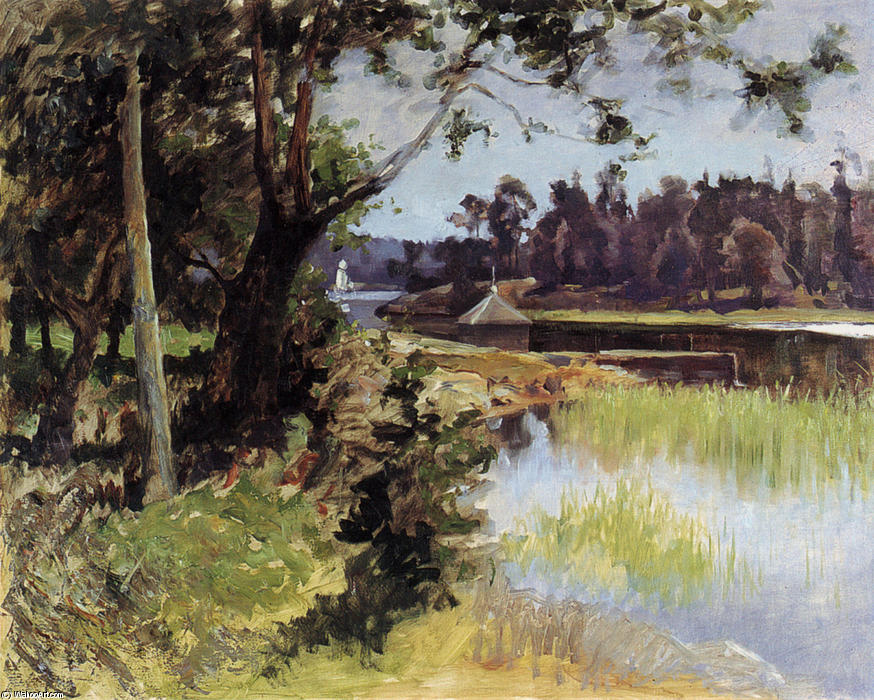
Kulosaari Strait, 1895

== See also ==
- Golden Age of Finnish Art
- Art in Finland
