= Katja Kallio =

Finnish novelist (born 1968)

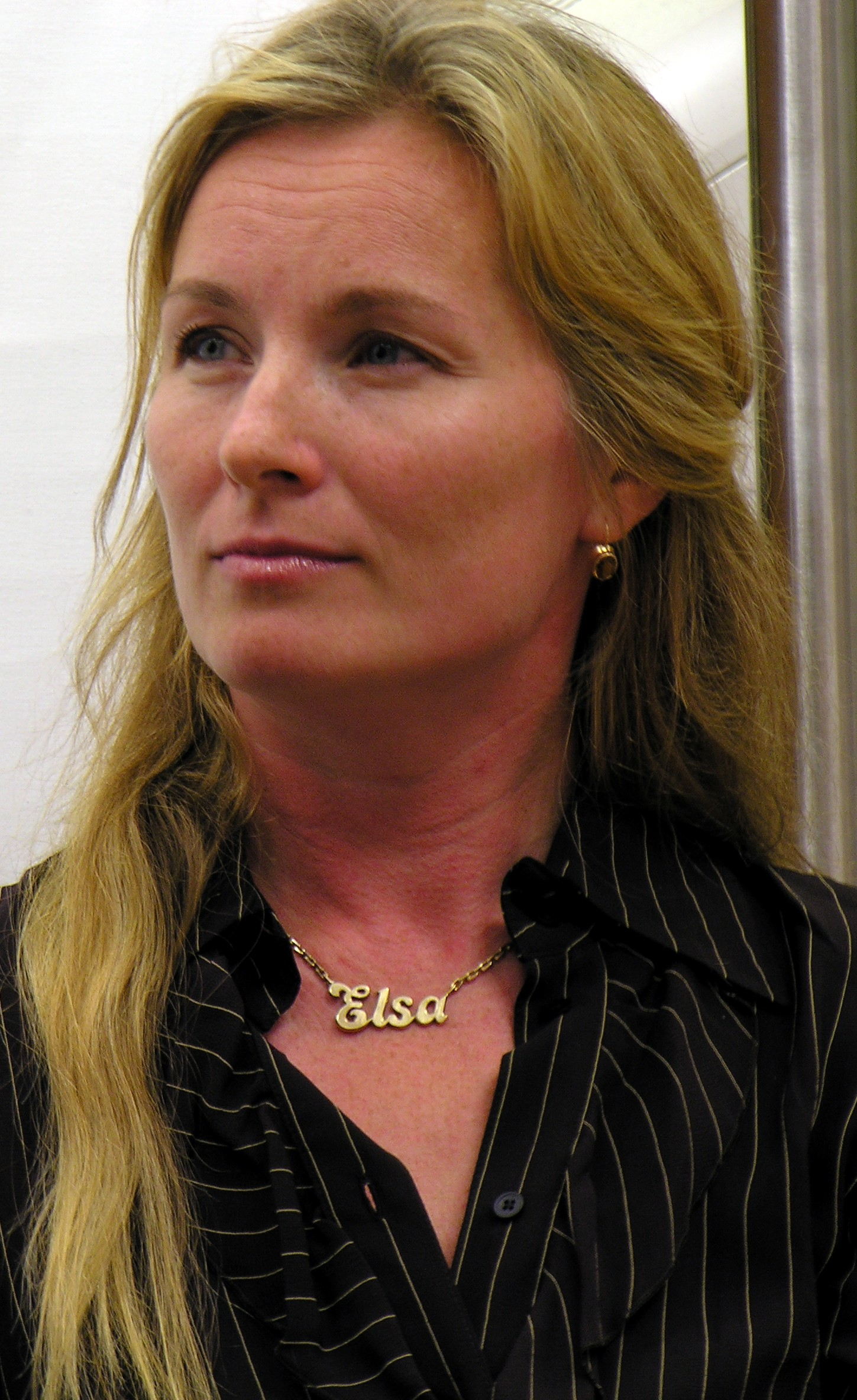
- Born: 17 September 1968 (age 58); Turku, Finland
- Occupations: novelist, journalist, columnist and screenwriter
- Spouse: Asko Kallonen (m. 1994)
- Children: 2

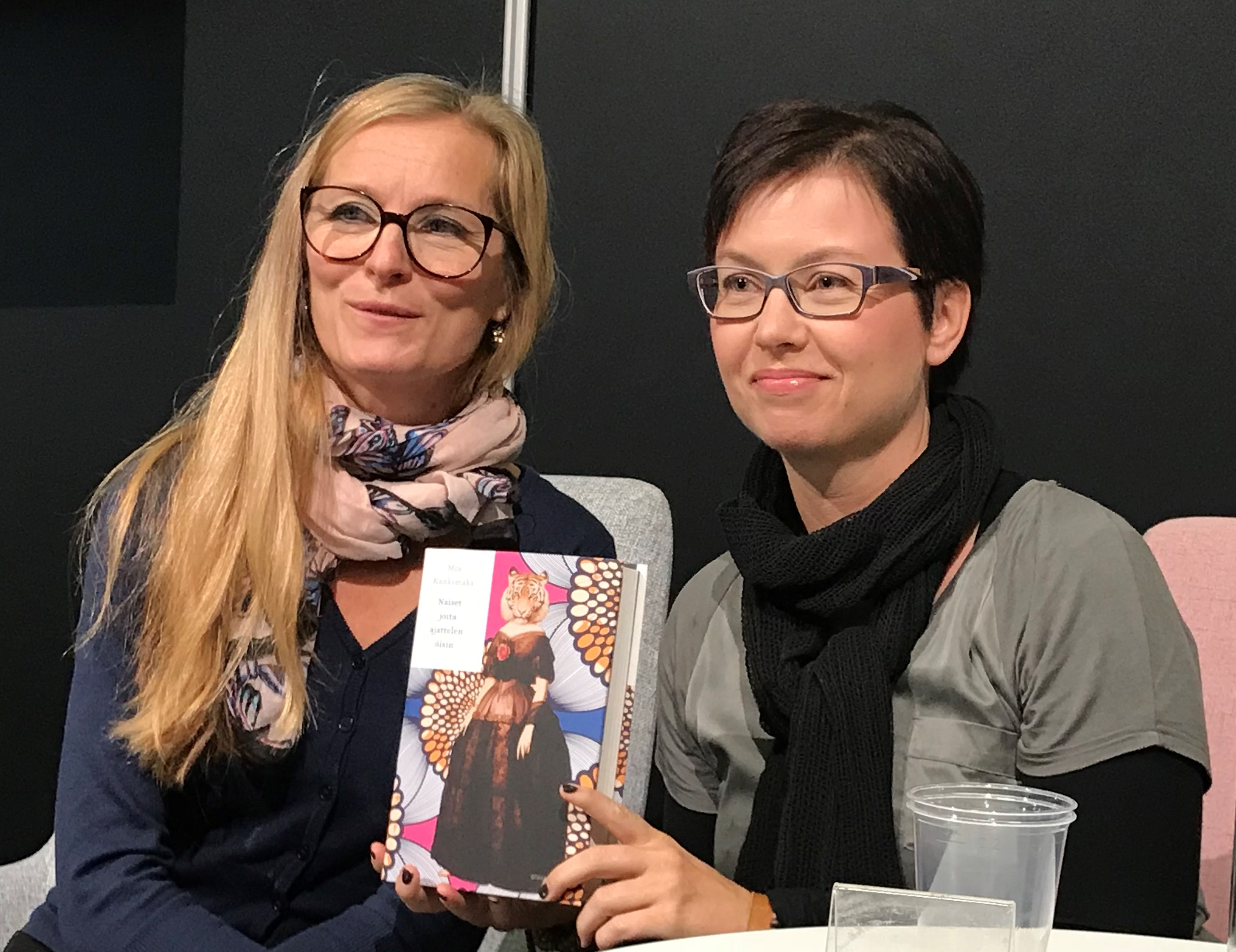
Katja Kallio interviewing Mia Kankimäki at Helsinki Book Fair 2018.

Katja Elina Kallio (born 17 September 1968) is a Finnish novelist, screenwriter, and columnist. She is the author of seven novels and three short prose collections.

== Early life ==
Katja Kallio was born on 17 September 1968, in Turku.

== Career ==
Kallio has written seven novels, two of which have been turned into Finnish feature films.

Her novels include, Kuutamolla in 2000, Sooloilua in 2002, Karilla in 2008, Syntikirja in 2009, Säkenöivät hetket in 2013, Yön kantaja in 2017, and Tämä läpinäkyvä sydän in 2021.

In 2002, her novel Kuutamolla was made into a film, Lovers & Leavers, for which she was the screenwriter. It was directed by Aku Louhimies, and starred Minna Haapkylä, Anna-Leena Härkönen, and Laura Malmivaara.

In 2007, Sooloilua (Playing Solo) was released as a film, directed by Lauri Nurkse, and starring Saija Lentonen, Kari-Pekka Toivonen, and Kristiina Elstelä, with Kallio again being the screenwriter.

In 2010, If You Love (Jos rakastat) was released, based on an original idea by Jarkko Hentula, and with the screenplay written by Kallio.

== Personal life ==
In 1994, Kallio married Asko Kallonen, who works in music industry. They have two children, and live in Helsinki.
