= Hannu-Pekka Björkman =

Finnish actor (born 1969)

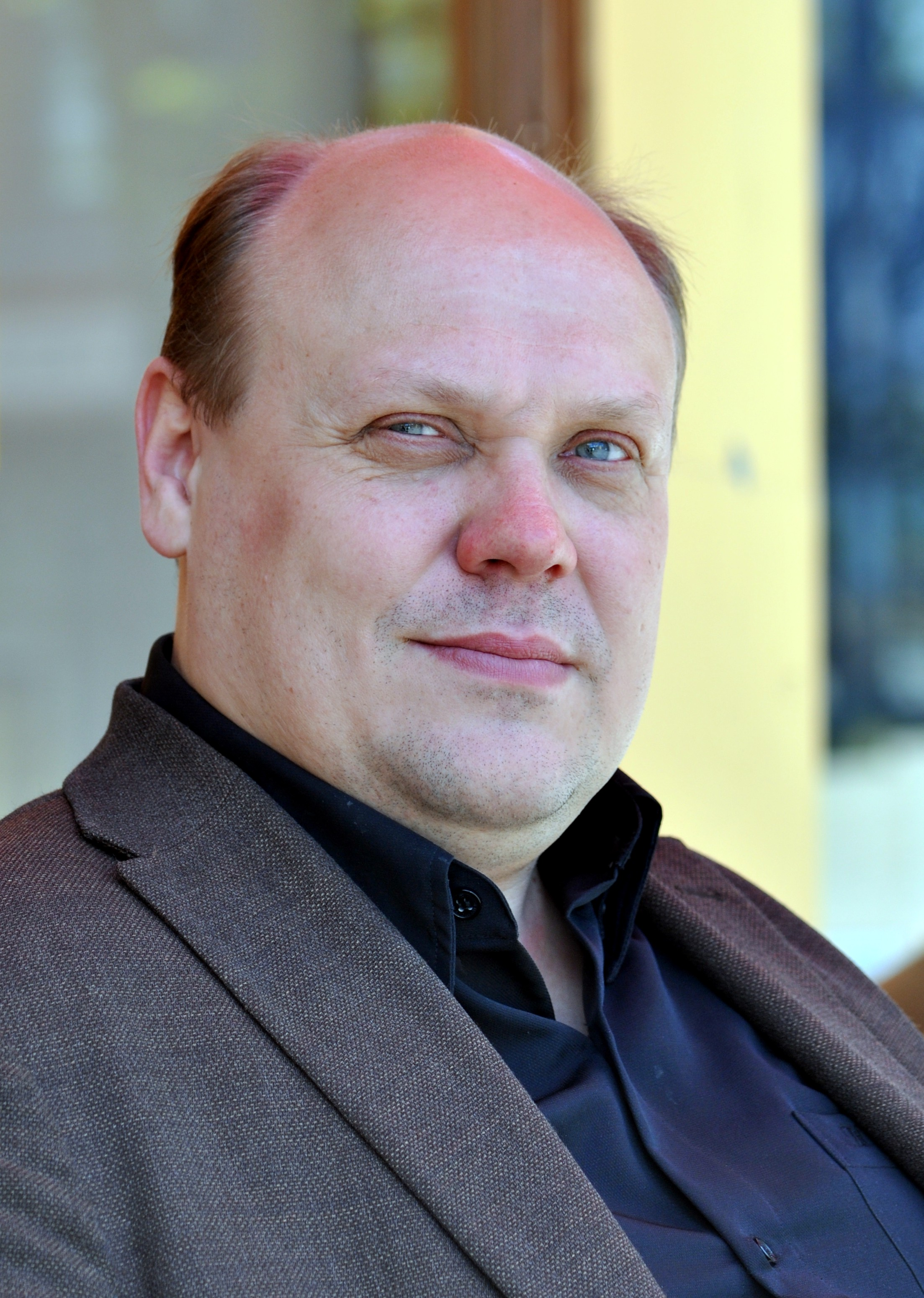
Björkman in 2009

Hannu-Pekka Juhani Björkman (born 11 February 1969) is a Finnish actor who has appeared in theatres, on television and in films. In 2005, he won a Jussi Award for the best actor in a leading role for a film Eläville ja kuolleille.

== Personal life ==
Björkman was born in Kannonkoski. He was married to actress Minna Haapkylä from 2002 to 2014. They have two sons. Björkman is a member of the Finnish Orthodox Church.

== Selected filmography ==
=== Films ===
- Lakeuden kutsu (2000)
- Eila (2003)
- Bad Boys (2003)
- Producing Adults (2004)
- Eläville ja kuolleille (2005)
- FC Venus (2005)
- Christmas Story (2007)
- The Border (2007)
- Blackout (2008)
- The Flight Before Christmas (2008)
- The House of Branching Love (2009)
- The Interrogation (2009)
- Almost 18 (2012)
- Armi Alive! (2015)
- The Eternal Road (2017)
- Aurora (2019)
- The Renovation (2020)
- Lapua 1976 (2023)
- The Missile (2024)
- The Black Hole (2024)
- Never Alone (2025)
- Red Snow (2026)

=== Television ===
- Sincerely Yours in Cold Blood (2002)
- M/S Romantic (2019)
