= Jarkko Hentula =

Film and television producer

Jarkko Hentula (born 1970) has worked primarily as a producer or an executive producer in over 40 feature films and TV-productions. Hentula is the Head of Feature Films in Yellow Film & TV production company.

== Education ==
Hentula studied communication and history at the University of Tampere and production in the Film and Television department at Helsinki's University of Art and Design.

== Career ==
In 1998 Hentula started working as a production manager at MRP Matila & Röhr Productions. During that time he for example worked in Olli Saarela’s Ambush (1999).

He moved to their subsidiary, Talent House, in 2000. Hentula's first long features were Lovers & Leavers by Aku Louhimies (2002), Pearls and Pigs by Perttu Leppä (2003) and FC Venus by Joona Tena (2005), all of which received commercial success. Hentula also produced JP Siili's miniseries Julia's Truth (2001) for Talent House, which received a Prix Italia award.

In 2004 Hentula started his own production company called Juonifilmi. He co-owned the company with FS Film (now SF Studios). In Juonifilmi Hentula produced The Border (2007) by Lauri Törhönen together with Jörn Donner and awarded Last Cowboy Standing (2008) by Zaida Bergoth. He also worked as a co-producer in Arn – The Knight Templar (2007).

In 2011 Hentula was appointed the head of feature films in Yellow Film & TV, a Finnish production company. They specialize in scripted TV production, movies, drama, comedy, entertainment and sports.

In Yellow Film & TV Hentula has for example produced JP Siili’s Härmä (2012) and a commercial success Lapland Odyssey 2 (2015). Hentula has also been part of numerous international co-productions, such as Michael Marcimain's Call Girl (2012). Hentula has also produced awarded Kimmo TV-series (2012–).

Hentula received the Film Producer of the Year Award in 2004. Hentula served as chairman of the board for The Central Organisation of Finnish Film Producers 2008–2012.

== Selected filmography ==
- Pearls and Pigs (2003) – Producer
- FC Venus (2005) – Producer
- The Border (2007) – Producer
- Arn the Knight Templar (2007) – co-producer: Juonifilmi Oy
- Skavabölen pojat (2009) – Producer
- Jos Rakastat (2010) – Producer
- Likainen Pommi (2011) – Producer
- Risto (2011) – Executive producer
- Härmä (2012) – Producer
- Call Girl (2012) – Co-producer
- Sel8nne (2013) – Executive producer
- Ainoat oikeat (2013) – Producer
- Lapland Odyssey 2 (2015) – Producer
