= Teemu Selänne =

Finnish ice hockey player (born 1970)

- Hockey Hall of Fame, 2017
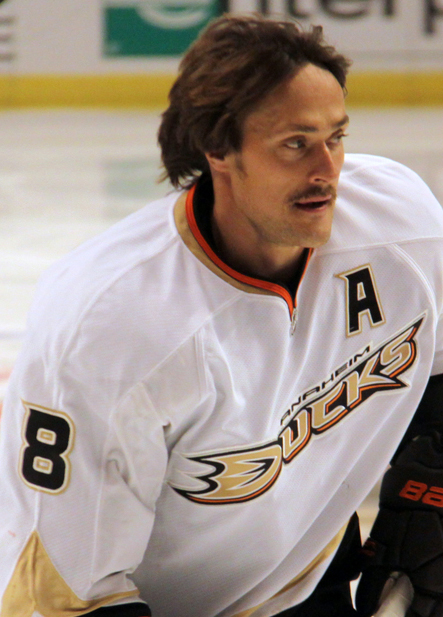
- Selänne with the Anaheim Ducks in 2010
- Born: July 3, 1970 (age 56) Helsinki, Finland
- Height: 6 ft 0 in (183 cm)
- Weight: 209 lb (95 kg; 14 st 13 lb)
- Position: Right wing
- Shot: Right
- Played for: Jokerit; Winnipeg Jets; Anaheim Ducks; San Jose Sharks; Colorado Avalanche
- National team: Finland
- NHL draft: 10th overall, 1988; Winnipeg Jets
- Playing career: 1989–2014

Teemu Ilmari Selänne (Finnish pronunciation: [ˈteːmu ˈselænːe]; born July 3, 1970) is a Finnish former professional ice hockey player. Playing as a right winger, he began his professional career in 1989–90 with Jokerit of the SM-liiga and later played 21 seasons in the National Hockey League (NHL) for the Winnipeg Jets, Anaheim Ducks, San Jose Sharks, and Colorado Avalanche. Nicknamed "the Finnish Flash", Selänne is the highest-scoring Finn in NHL history, and one of the highest overall; he retired in 2014 11th all-time with 684 goals and 15th with 1,457 points. He holds numerous team scoring records for both the Winnipeg and Anaheim franchises. His jersey number 8 was retired by the Ducks in 2015. In 2017, Selänne was named one of the '100 Greatest NHL Players' in history. On June 26, 2017, Selänne was elected to the Hockey Hall of Fame as the second Finn after Jari Kurri.

Selänne was a first-round selection of the Jets, 10th overall, at the 1988 NHL entry draft, but initially remained in Finland. He led the SM-liiga in scoring as part of Jokerit's Kanada-malja winning team in 1991–92 before moving to North America. He broke into the NHL by recording 76 goals and 132 points in 1992–93. It remains the league record for most goals and points by a rookie and earned him the Calder Memorial Trophy as the top first-year player in the NHL. He has scored 50 goals in a season three times and topped 100 points on four occasions. He played in 10 NHL All-Star Games, was named to four postseason All-Star teams and won the inaugural Maurice "Rocket" Richard Trophy in 1998–99 as the league's leading goal scorer. He was named recipient of the Bill Masterton Memorial Trophy in 2005–06 for perseverance and dedication to the game and was a member of the Ducks' 2007 Stanley Cup championship team.

Internationally, Selänne was a long-time member of the Finland national team. He played in five World Championships, winning a silver and bronze medal, and in three Canada Cup/World Cup of Hockey tournaments. A six-time Olympian, Selänne helped Finland win three bronze medals and, in 2006, a silver medal. He is the all-time leader in scoring at the Olympic men's ice hockey tournament with 43 points. A national star in his native country, Selänne is the subject of a top-grossing biographical documentary in Finland. He was inducted into the IIHF Hall of Fame in 2017.

== Early life ==
Selänne was born on July 3, 1970, in Helsinki, Finland. He has a twin brother, Paavo, and another brother, Panu. He was raised by his mother Liisa Viitanen and father Ilmari Selänne until they divorced in the late 1980s. The family lived for a time in Rauma before settling in Espoo around the time Teemu was 5 years old.

Selänne played three sports as a youth: hockey, bandy and association football. He played hockey and football with and against Paavo, though his brother ultimately gave up on both sports in favour of field hockey, where he was a member of numerous Finnish and European championship teams. Teemu was small as a youth, creating in him a competitive spirit and drive to improve his skills. Focusing on hockey, he eventually joined the junior squad of Jokerit in Helsinki.

As a young adult, Selänne attended business school for two years and served a mandatory one-year stint with the Finnish Defence Forces. During his tenure with Jokerit, he also spent three years as a kindergarten teacher. His experiences visiting kids at Helsinki's children's hospital led to him co-founding the Godfathers' Foundation, an organization that raises money for ill children.

== Playing career ==
=== Jokerit (1989–1992) ===
Selänne played three years of junior hockey in Jokerit's development program, culminating in 1987–88 with a 43-goal, 66 point season in 33 games and a Finnish Junior A championship. His performance prompted the National Hockey League (NHL)'s Winnipeg Jets to select him with their first-round pick, tenth overall, at the 1988 NHL entry draft. Selänne attended training camp with the Jets, but returned to Finland owing to his military service.

After graduating from junior hockey, Selänne joined Jokerit's senior team in the 1. Divisioona in 1988–89 and scored 69 points in 35 games. Jokerit moved up to the SM-liiga in 1989–90, and while Selänne missed the majority of the season due to a leg injury, he scored 12 points in 11 games played. Playing a full season in 1990–91, Selänne scored 33 goals and 58 points in 42 games. He was named the recipient of the Raimo Kilpiö trophy as the league's most gentlemanly player. Selänne's best season in the SM-liiga came in 1991–92 when he recorded 62 points in 44 games. With 39 goals, he won the Aarne Honkavaara trophy as top goal scorer. He added 17 points in ten playoff games, and scored the winning goal as Jokerit won the Kanada-malja as SM-liiga playoff champion.

=== Winnipeg Jets (1992–1996) ===
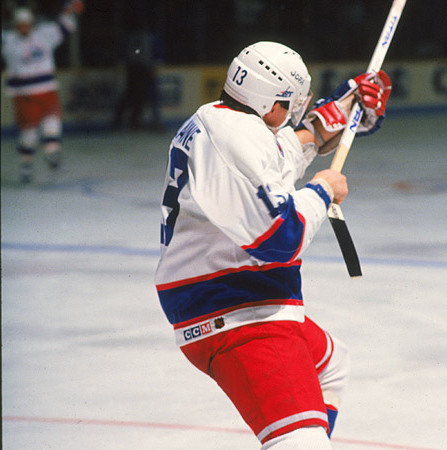
Teemu Selänne celebrates breaking the NHL rookie goal record.

The Jets' organizational philosophy at the time was to allow their European draft picks to develop in their native countries, but by 1991, the franchise was working to bring him to Winnipeg. As Selänne had not yet signed a contract when he chose to play in North America for the 1992–93 season, he was considered a restricted free agent. The Calgary Flames signed him to an offer sheet on a three-year contract worth $2.7 million, $1.5 million higher than what the Jets had been offering. Though concerned about paying such a high salary, Winnipeg exercised its right to match the offer. Selänne made his NHL debut on October 6, 1992, and recorded two assists in a 4–1 Jets victory over the Detroit Red Wings. He scored his first career NHL goal two nights later against goaltender Jeff Hackett of the San Jose Sharks.

Selänne scored his first career hat trick in his fifth game and had 11 goals in his first 12 NHL games. He finished the season with 16 multi-goal games, including four hat-tricks and a four-goal game, en route to breaking the NHL record for goals by a rookie. He surpassed Mike Bossy's record of 53 goals on March 2, 1993, against the Quebec Nordiques and on March 23, scored his 110th point, against the Toronto Maple Leafs, to break Peter Šťastný's rookie points record. Selänne finished the season tied for fifth in scoring with 132 points, and his 76 goals tied with Alexander Mogilny for the league lead. His offensive exploits helped pull the Jets into the 1993 Stanley Cup playoffs, where they lost a first-round matchup to the Vancouver Canucks. In recognition of his season, Selänne was voted the recipient of the Calder Memorial Trophy as rookie of the year, was named to the first All-Star team, and played in his first of ten career NHL All-Star Games.

Unable to maintain a similar pace in 1993–94—indeed, his rookie totals in goals and points would both prove his career-high by more than 20—Selänne's offensive production declined by 30 percent midway through the season. He scored his 100th career goal on January 12, 1994, against the Buffalo Sabres, reaching the milestone in his 130th game, the second-fastest in NHL history and only one game later than Bossy. Selänne finished the season with 54 points in 51 games, but missed the final 33 games of the season after suffering a severed Achilles tendon in a January 26 game against the Mighty Ducks of Anaheim. The 1994–95 NHL lockout resulted in Selänne splitting the season between Jokerit and the Jets. While playing in Finland, Selänne was named to the tournament all-star team as Jokerit won the 1994 European Cup.

Selänne's future in Winnipeg, a small, often cash-strapped market came into question several times during this career, to the extent that pundits reported at the 1995 NHL entry draft that he may be traded out of Winnipeg around the time of the draft (at which point he was unsigned). While a trade in the off-season never materialized, Selänne's career in Winnipeg came to an end midway through the following 1995–96 season. He was leading the Jets with 72 points when, on February 6, 1996, he was traded to Anaheim. The Mighty Ducks sent first-round draft picks Chad Kilger and Oleg Tverdovsky, along with a third-round selection at the 1996 NHL entry draft, in exchange for Selänne, Marc Chouinard and a fourth-round draft pick. Selänne was upset when notified of the deal during practice and left the Winnipeg Arena without speaking to anyone.

=== Mighty Ducks of Anaheim (1996–2001) ===
Following a period of adjustment, Selänne gained an appreciation for his new team; he quickly came to call the deal the best thing that ever happened to him. He was paired with Paul Kariya, whom he met at the 1996 NHL All-Star Game, and the duo were counted on to lead the young franchise to a postseason berth for the first time. Selänne scored 36 points in 28 games with the Ducks, and combined with his Jets totals, finished the 1995–96 season with 108 points. He followed it up with a third 100-point season in 1996–97, finishing with 109, including 51 goals. He was named to the first All-Star team for a second time, while he and Kariya led the Mighty Ducks into the franchise's first playoff appearance in 1997. Despite being criticized as being a "one-line team", Anaheim defeated the Phoenix Coyotes in the first round before being eliminated by the Detroit Red Wings.

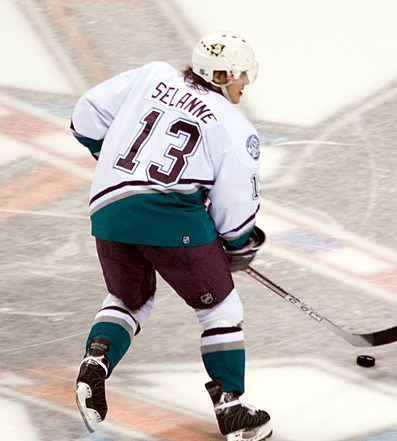
Selänne in a game against San Jose during the 2005–06 season. In his return to Anaheim, Selänne wore the jersey number 13, the same he had worn in his first two seasons in Winnipeg, because his favorite number 8 was already worn by teammate Sandis Ozoliņš. Selänne returned to wearing number 8 the following season.

The 1998 All-Star Game was Selänne's fifth, and after scoring a hat-trick, he became the first European player to be named the MVP in the All-Star Game's 46-year history. He finished the 1997–98 season with his third career 50-goal season; his total of 52 tied Peter Bondra for the NHL lead, and he scored his 500th career point on January 12, 1998, with an assist against the Los Angeles Kings. He was a finalist for both the Hart Memorial Trophy as the League's MVP (finishing third) and the Lady Byng Memorial Trophy for gentlemanly conduct (as the runner-up), and was named to the second All-Star team. The NHL created the Maurice "Rocket" Richard Trophy in 1998–99 to be presented to the League's leading goal scorer; Selänne became its inaugural winner following a 47-goal season.

=== San Jose Sharks (2001–2003) ===
An 85-point season followed in 1999–2000, and he was the Mighty Ducks' leading scorer with 59 points through 61 games in 2000–01. Anaheim, however, sat in last place in the Western Conference, and on March 5, 2001, chose to make a trade. Selänne was sent to San Jose in exchange for Jeff Friesen, Steve Shields and a second-round selection in the 2003 NHL entry draft. Selänne's debut with the Sharks was delayed by two weeks as he underwent minor surgery to remove loose cartilage in his knee the following day. After finishing the season with 13 points in 12 games with San Jose, Selänne led the Sharks with 29 goals in 2001–02. He also led the team in both goals (28; tied) and points (64) in 2002–03. As the Sharks fell out of the playoff race, they looked to make changes; the New Jersey Devils sought to acquire Selänne, but he exercised a no-trade clause in his contract and blocked the deal.

=== Colorado Avalanche (2003–2004) ===
Selänne then declined an option in his contract that would have paid $6.5 million in 2003–04 and instead opted to sign a one-year, $5.8 million contract with the Colorado Avalanche, where he was joined by former Anaheim teammate Paul Kariya. The pair chose to sign with the Avalanche together in the belief it was their best chance at winning the Stanley Cup. Their hope failed to materialize, however, as Selänne endured a disastrous season in which he scored only 16 goals and 32 points—the lowest totals of his career to that date—and was ultimately relegated to Colorado's fourth line, but was also held out of the lineup as a healthy scratch during a playoff game. He struggled throughout the year with knee problems that ultimately required surgery, his third such procedure, and with the 2004–05 season canceled by a labour dispute, took the time off to recover.

=== Return to Anaheim (2005–2014) ===
A free agent when the NHL resumed play in 2005–06, Selänne returned to Anaheim by signing a one-year, $1 million contract with the Mighty Ducks. As his usual number 8 was being worn by defenceman Sandis Ozoliņš, Selänne returned to wearing number 13, the number he had worn during his first two NHL seasons with the Winnipeg Jets. During a resurgent season, he scored his 1,000th career point on January 30, 2006, with a goal in a 4–3 victory over Los Angeles. Selänne completed the season with 40 goals and 90 points, both of which led the Mighty Ducks, and he was named the recipient of the Bill Masterton Memorial Trophy for dedication and perseverance.

After reaching the Western Conference Final in the 2006 playoffs, the newly renamed Anaheim Ducks entered the 2006–07 season with high expectations; the team brought Selänne back with a one-year, $3.75 million contract. He reached several milestones during the season: Selänne became the 36th player in NHL history, and second Finn after Jari Kurri, to score 500 goals, on November 22, 2006, against Colorado. On December 31, he played his 1,000th NHL game. As part of a season in which he again led Anaheim in goals (48) and points (94), Selänne played in his tenth All-Star Game in 2007, and scored his first hat-trick in six years (the 19th of his career) on January 12, 2007. It was the same day he spoke with a friend in Finland with terminal cancer who asked to be sent the game puck if Selänne had a three-goal game. Finally, he scored his 301st goal as a Duck on February 18, 2007, to break Paul Kariya's franchise record.

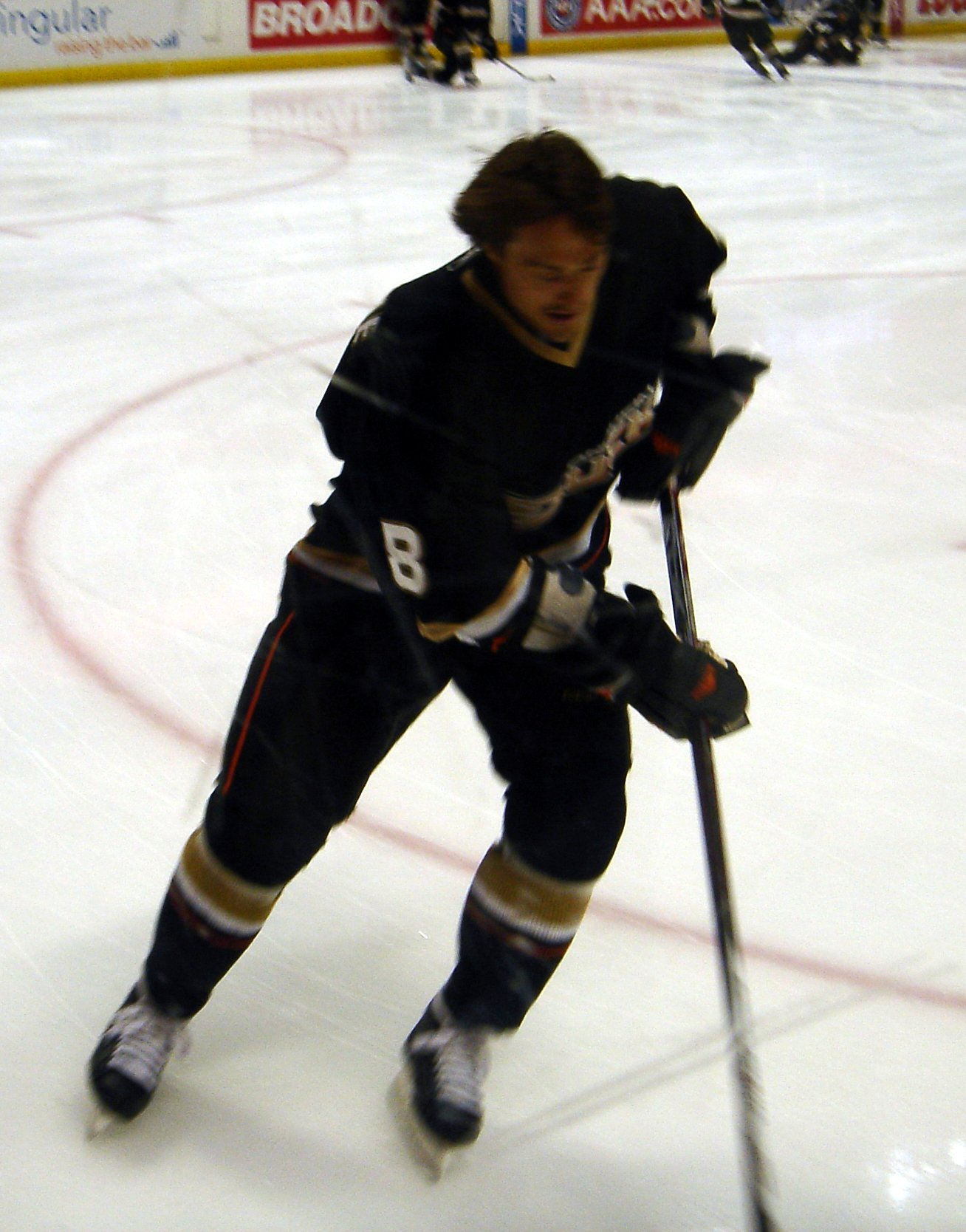
Selänne during a pre-game warm-up in 2007

Early in the 2007 playoffs, Selänne became Anaheim's all-time leading playoff scorer when he recorded his 30th point as a Duck with an assist on April 13 against the Minnesota Wild. The Ducks defeated the Wild, Vancouver Canucks and Detroit Red Wings to reach the Stanley Cup Final; it was the first time in Selänne's career that he played in the NHL's championship series. As the sentimental favourite to win the Stanley Cup, his teammates motivated themselves to win the title for his benefit; Ducks goaltender Jean-Sébastien Giguère noted, "We don't have any better teammate. He's a guy who always has fun. He deserves this and if we can help him along the way, that would be great. I'd just love to see Teemu win this thing." Selänne finished the playoffs with 15 points in 21 games, and after 14 NHL seasons, the 36-year-old Selänne raised the Stanley Cup with his teammates after defeating the Ottawa Senators in five games.

Following the Cup win, Selänne contemplated retirement. He remained undecided on a return—and as a free agent, out of the Ducks lineup to begin the 2007–08 season—until he finally chose to return and signed a one-year contract with Anaheim on January 28, 2008. He made his return on February 5 against the New York Islanders, and the Ducks posted the League's best record from that point to the end of the regular season by winning 20 of 26 games. In his third game back, Selänne scored his 670th point as a member of the Ducks with an assist in a 4–2 victory over the Calgary Flames. With it, he broke Kariya's franchise record of 669.

Selänne returned to the Ducks in 2008–09 and signed a two-year contract. He missed several weeks of the season due to a quad muscle injury suffered when he was cut by his own skate following a hit by Denis Grebeshkov of the Edmonton Oilers, but appeared in 65 games and scored 54 points. He played his 1,100th game during the season, became the sixth European player to score 1,200 career points and appeared in his 100th career playoff game. Selänne reached additional milestones in 2009–10, as he became the 18th player in NHL history to score 600 goals, accomplishing the feat on March 21, 2010, against the Colorado Avalanche and upon scoring his 602nd goal on April 2 against the Vancouver Canucks, surpassing his childhood idol, Jari Kurri.

Selänne finished eighth in NHL scoring in 2010–11 with 31 goals and 49 assists in 73 games. His 80 points was the third-highest in NHL history by a player over the age of 40 (Gordie Howe, 103 and Johnny Bucyk, 83). He also scored his 1,300th point, achieving the mark with a two-goal performance on January 16, 2011, against Edmonton. Questions about whether Selänne would return for another NHL season had become an annual topic of discussion, and his decision to return for 2011–12 was delayed by a knee operation that left him uncertain if he would be capable of playing. Nonetheless, Selänne appeared in every game for the Ducks and became the oldest player in NHL history to play an entire 82-game season while leading the team with 66 points. 15 years after the original Jets relocated, a new Winnipeg Jets franchise joined the NHL, and fans in the Manitoba capital continued to view Selänne as a local hero. In his first return to Winnipeg, he was cheered by exuberant fans who booed every other Ducks player. Selänne was named to the Western Conference roster for the 2012 NHL All-Star Game, but declined his invitation and asked the league to instead send his teammate Corey Perry.

Following a 24-point effort in the lockout-shortened 2012–13 season, Selänne announced that 2013–14 would be the 21st and final season of his NHL career. He missed several games early in the season after he was struck in the face by an errant stick that knocked out several teeth and required 40 stitches to close cuts. Selänne recorded 27 points in 64 games for the Ducks; his final regular season game, a 3–2 victory over Colorado, was a celebration of his career. He wore the captain's "C" in place of Ryan Getzlaf for the game and as it neared conclusion, received standing ovations from the Anaheim crowd each time he took a shift. Selänne was named the game's first, second and third star following the game and took a celebratory lap with Colorado goaltender and former Anaheim teammate Jean-Sébastien Giguère, who was also contemplating retirement.

Selänne made his final postseason appearance during the 2014 playoffs. He had six points in 12 games, but was also held out of the lineup for one game against the Dallas Stars, a decision that angered Ducks fans. He played his final game on May 16, 2014, as the Ducks were eliminated by Los Angeles. Following the contest, Selänne was saluted by fans, teammates and opponents alike, and took a final lap around the rink.

=== International ===
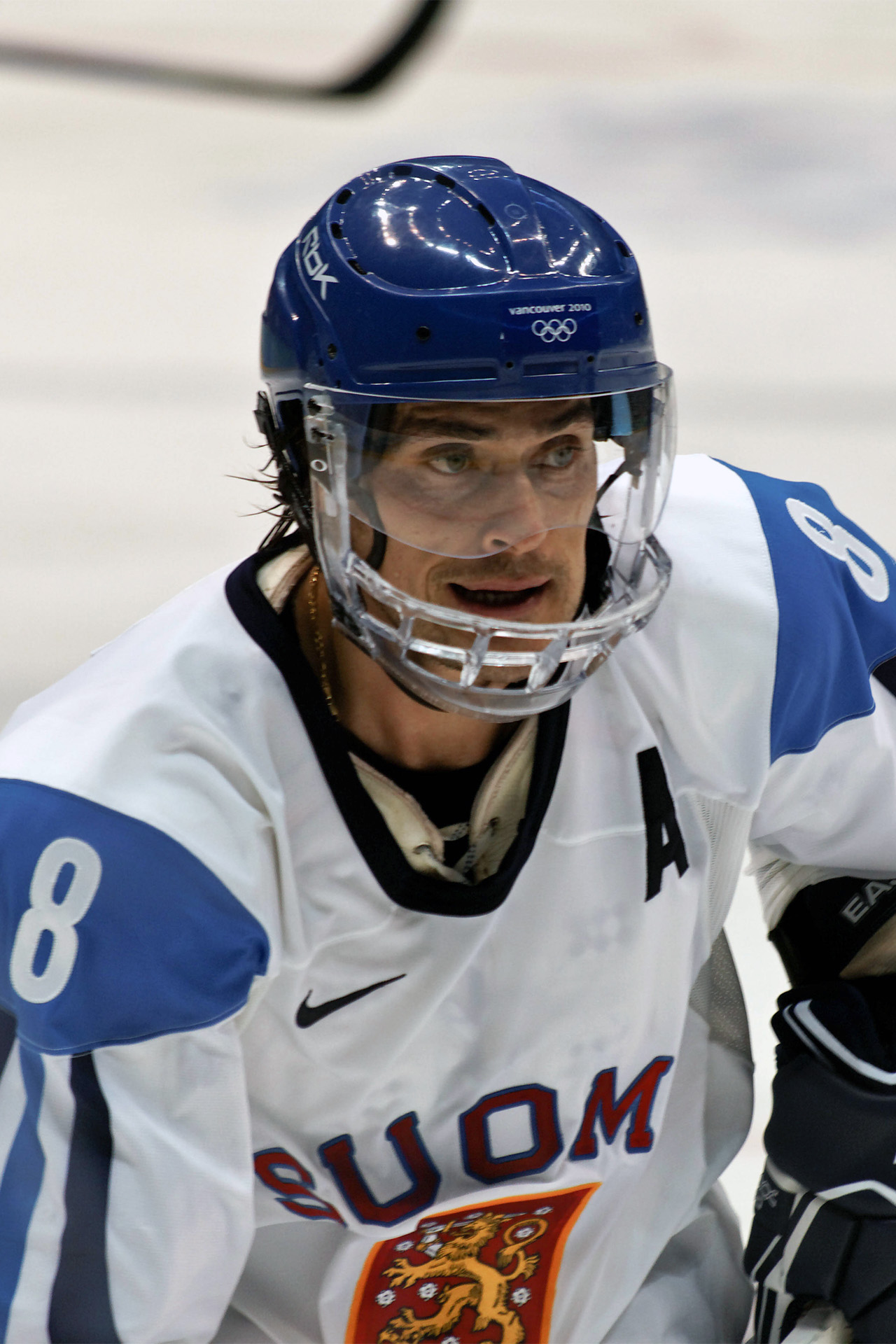
- Selänne at the 2010 Winter Olympics

Medal record

Men's ice hockey

Representing Finland

Olympic Games
Silver medal – second place	2006 Turin	
Bronze medal – third place	1998 Nagano	
Bronze medal – third place	2010 Vancouver	
Bronze medal – third place	2014 Sochi	

World Championships
Silver medal – second place	1999 Norway	
Bronze medal – third place	2008 Canada	

European Championship
Bronze medal – third place	1991 Finland	

Canada Cup / World Cup
Silver medal – second place	2004 Toronto	
Bronze medal – third place	1991 Hamilton	

IIHF European Junior Championships
Silver medal – second place	1988 Czechoslovakia	

Selänne's international debut came with the Finland national junior team. He recorded 16 points in six games at the 1988 European Junior Championship and was named to the tournament all-star team. After participating in the 1989 World Junior Ice Hockey Championships for the sixth place Finns, Selänne made his debut with the senior team at the 1991 World Championship where he finished third in tournament scoring with 11 points for the fifth-place finishers. After playing in the 1991 Canada Cup, he made his Olympic debut at the 1992 Albertville Games. Selänne tied for the tournament scoring lead with seven goals, and was tied for fourth in overall scoring at 11 points.

It was four years before Selänne returned to international play; he appeared in the 1996 World Championship and the 1996 World Cup of Hockey and averaged over one point per game in both tournaments as Finland finished fifth each time. At the 1998 Winter Olympics, Selänne finished with ten points in five games. He was the tournament's leading scorer on a Finnish team that he described in 2003 as the best he ever played on and the best in the tournament, but lost the semifinal, 7–4 to Russia. He suffered an abdominal muscle injury that prevented him from playing in the third place game, which Finland won 3–2 over Canada; Selänne and his teammates ended the tournament as the bronze medal winners.

The Finns finished one position higher at the 1999 World Championship; The tournament's medal round was conducted in a two-game series format followed by a ten-minute sudden victory overtime if the each team wins one game. Finland and Sweden split their semifinal, but the Finns advanced to the final in the overtime period after Selänne set up Marko Tuomainen's winning goal. The Czech Republic defeated Finland to capture the gold medal, also in a sudden victory period. Selänne finished the tournament with 11 points, was named to the all-star team and was voted the most valuable player of the World Championship.

Selänne served as the Finnish captain at the 2002 Winter Olympics and led his nation to an important preliminary round victory over Russia, however he had only three goals and no assists in four games as the Finns finished in sixth place. The World Championship was held in Finland, and the hosts were hailed as the favourite to win the title. Though Selänne led the tournament with eight goals, Finland lost their quarterfinal match against Sweden and finished fifth overall.

The 2004 World Cup of Hockey was played after Selänne's difficult NHL season with Colorado. For Selänne, the tournament was about recovering his joy at playing hockey. The Finns went undefeated to reach the final, but Selänne and his teammates had to settle for second place after losing the championship game to Canada, 3–2. Returning to the national team for the 2006 Winter Olympics in Turin, Selänne joined Jere Lehtinen and Saku Koivu on what The Hockey News called the best team Finland has ever produced. The Finns outscored their opposition 19–2 in the group stage, then defeated the United States and shut-out Russia in the semi-final. The Finns, however, were overcome in the final by Sweden, 3–2, and were relegated to the silver medal. Selänne scored six goals and 11 points in the tournament, was named to the all-star team and received the Directorate Award as top forward.

Selänne stated he would retire from international competition after a bronze medal-winning performance followed at the 2008 IIHF World Championship. However, he returned to play in his fifth Olympic tournament at the 2010 Vancouver Olympics. Selänne became the all-time leading scorer in Olympic hockey history on February 19, 2010, as he recorded his 37th point in competition in a game against Germany. The Finns won the bronze medal with a 5–3 victory over Slovakia in the third-place game.

Selänne was named to the Finnish team for the 2014 Sochi Olympics, which marked his sixth appearance at the tournament. In the quarterfinals, Selänne scored a goal and an assist as the Finns ousted the host Russians from the tournament, then added two goals in the bronze medal match in a 5–0 victory over the United States. The 43-year-old Selänne became the oldest player to win a medal in Olympic hockey, a record later broken by compatriot Riikka Sallinen in 2018. He was named most valuable player of the Olympic tournament as selected by the media, and added six points to his Olympic record career total of 43.

== Playing style ==
Selänne's primary attribute is his skating speed. Nicknamed the "Finnish Flash", he uses his speed to evade opposition defenders. According to defenceman Nicklas Lidström, "He's one of those snipers that can put the puck on net because he finds openings and he knows where to be on the ice. Former teammate Jean-Sébastien Giguère added, "He's just a very elegant player. He's got a very nice stride to his skating, he plays with a lot of energy, a lot of enthusiasm ... with the skill he has, it just makes for a heck of a great player."

An elite offensive player, Selänne is the highest scoring Finnish-born player in NHL history. He ended his career with 684 goals, 12th all-time in NHL history, and 1,457 points, 15th best. His 110 game-winning goals tied him with Brett Hull for fourth all-time. Selänne is one of eight players to score 70 or more goals in one season, and he is the most recent player to do so. He holds numerous records, including most goals, 76, and points, 132, by a rookie. Both totals are also single-season records for the Winnipeg Jets/Phoenix Coyotes franchise. The holder of most major franchise records for the Ducks, Selänne leads the team at 457 goals, 531 assists, 988 points and 966 games played. He also holds single season records with 52 goals and 109 points. Even before his playing career had ended, the Ducks announced that Selänne's number 8 would be the first number retired by the franchise. The team formally retired his number on January 11, 2015, prior to a game against the Jets.

== Personal life ==
Selänne was born in Helsinki. Selänne is known for his fun-loving personality and is known to make an effort to sign autographs and shake hands. He is well-respected in the NHL players, coaches, and fans, including those of opposing teams. Selänne considers Paul Kariya and Joe Sakic to be the best friends he has made in the NHL, and both attended his final regular season game against the Avalanche.

An avid car collector, Selänne has entered the World Rally Championship (WRC) twice, finishing the Rally Finland 33rd overall in 1997 and 24th in 1998. He raced under the pseudonym "Teukka Salama" ("Teddy Flash" in English). In 1999 Selänne was involved in a crash while practicing for a rally race in his native Finland, an incident that was national news in the country. The vehicle he crashed into was driven by Finnish Ice Hockey Association president Kalervo Kummola, which put the latter into a wheelchair for four months. Due to Finnish laws that set fines based on an offender's salary, Selänne received a $50,000 fine for the incident.

A popular figure in Finland, Selänne's success in the NHL has been credited with aiding the growth of hockey in the country. He was once named the sexiest man in Finland by fashion magazine Eeva, and is the subject of the 2013 documentary film Selänne, directed by JP Siili, and which chronicles his life. The film became the highest grossing documentary in Finnish history within a month of its September 27 release, and was the third highest grossing locally produced film of the year.

After retiring from professional ice hockey, Selänne has become an active political commentator on Twitter. Selänne has said that he got interested in politics in 2015 after Donald Trump started his political campaign. Selänne supported Trump for president in the 2016 United States presidential election, but has later stated that he has been falsely labeled a Trump supporter. In 2023, he mentioned Mike Pence and Ron DeSantis as politicians he prefers over Trump. In Finnish politics, Selänne has supported the centre-right National Coalition Party. In 2024, Selänne self-identified as a Republican and again endorsed Donald Trump in the 2024 United States presidential election. It was the first American presidential election where he could vote.

Selänne opened a popular, Michelin-recommended steakhouse in nearby Laguna Beach with longtime friend Jim Shumate, a longtime Orange County restaurant operator who finally found the Laguna Beach property after a five-year search throughout Orange County.

In November 2019, Selänne released his authorized biography in North America titled Teemu Selänne: My Life. In March 2024, Selänne and his wife Sirpa gained citizenship of the United States. They have lived in Southern California since 1996.

In May 2023, Selänne was announced to become one of the three presenters on Top Gear Suomi, the Finnish adaptation of Top Gear. The series, broadcast on MTV3 since 2024, follows the same format as the original program, with the hosts reviewing cars, taking part in challenges, and competing in various automotive-themed events. Selänne's long-standing passion for cars and motorsport made him a central figure of the show.

Selänne starred in the August 1, 2024 movie Minor Leaguer, alongside hockey legend Brett Hull.

== Career statistics ==
=== Regular season and playoffs ===
Bold indicates led league

			Regular season					Playoffs
Season	Team	League	GP	G	A	Pts	PIM	GP	G	A	Pts	PIM
1986–87	Jokerit	FIN U20	33	10	12	22	8	—	—	—	—	—
1987–88	Jokerit	FIN U20	33	43	23	66	18	5	4	3	7	2
1987–88	Jokerit	FIN.2	5	1	1	2	0	—	—	—	—	—
1988–89	Jokerit	FIN U20	3	8	8	16	4	—	—	—	—	—
1988–89	Jokerit	FIN.2	35	36	33	69	14	5	7	3	10	4
1989–90	Jokerit	SM-l	11	4	8	12	0	—	—	—	—	—
1990–91	Jokerit	SM-l	42	33	25	58	12	—	—	—	—	—
1991–92	Jokerit	SM-l	44	39	23	62	20	10	10	7	17	18
1992–93	Winnipeg Jets	NHL	84	**76**	56	132	45	6	4	2	6	2
1993–94	Winnipeg Jets	NHL	51	25	29	54	22	—	—	—	—	—
1994–95	Jokerit	SM-l	20	7	12	19	6	—	—	—	—	—
1994–95	Winnipeg Jets	NHL	45	22	26	48	2	—	—	—	—	—
1995–96	Winnipeg Jets	NHL	51	24	48	72	18	—	—	—	—	—
1995–96	Mighty Ducks of Anaheim	NHL	28	16	20	36	4	—	—	—	—	—
1996–97	Mighty Ducks of Anaheim	NHL	78	51	58	109	34	11	7	3	10	4
1997–98	Mighty Ducks of Anaheim	NHL	73	**52**	34	86	30	—	—	—	—	—
1998–99	Mighty Ducks of Anaheim	NHL	75	**47**	60	107	30	4	2	2	4	2
1999–00	Mighty Ducks of Anaheim	NHL	79	33	52	85	12	—	—	—	—	—
2000–01	Mighty Ducks of Anaheim	NHL	61	26	33	59	36	—	—	—	—	—
2000–01	San Jose Sharks	NHL	12	7	6	13	0	6	0	2	2	0
2001–02	San Jose Sharks	NHL	82	29	25	54	40	12	5	3	8	2
2002–03	San Jose Sharks	NHL	82	28	36	64	30	—	—	—	—	—
2003–04	Colorado Avalanche	NHL	78	16	16	32	32	10	0	3	3	2
2005–06	Mighty Ducks of Anaheim	NHL	80	40	50	90	44	16	6	8	14	2
2006–07	Anaheim Ducks	NHL	82	48	46	94	82	21	5	10	15	10
2007–08	Anaheim Ducks	NHL	26	12	11	23	8	6	2	2	4	6
2008–09	Anaheim Ducks	NHL	65	27	27	54	36	13	4	2	6	4
2009–10	Anaheim Ducks	NHL	54	27	21	48	16	—	—	—	—	—
2010–11	Anaheim Ducks	NHL	73	31	49	80	49	6	6	1	7	12
2011–12	Anaheim Ducks	NHL	82	26	40	66	50	—	—	—	—	—
2012–13	Anaheim Ducks	NHL	46	12	12	24	28	7	1	2	3	6
2013–14	Anaheim Ducks	NHL	64	9	18	27	12	12	2	4	6	4
SM-liiga totals			117	83	68	151	38	10	10	7	17	18
NHL totals			1,451	684	773	1,457	660	130	44	44	88	62

=== International ===
Year	Team	Event	GP	G	A	Pts	PIM
1988	Finland	EJC	6	7	9	16	8
1989	Finland	WJC	7	5	5	10	10
1991	Finland	WC	10	6	5	11	2
1991	Finland	CC	6	1	1	2	2
1992	Finland	OLY	8	7	4	11	6
1996	Finland	WC	6	5	3	8	0
1996	Finland	WCH	4	3	2	5	0
1998	Finland	OLY	5	4	6	10	8
1999	Finland	WC	11	3	8	11	2
2002	Finland	OLY	4	3	0	3	2
2003	Finland	WC	7	8	3	11	2
2004	Finland	WCH	6	1	3	4	4
2006	Finland	OLY	8	6	5	11	4
2008	Finland	WC	9	3	4	7	12
2010	Finland	OLY	6	0	2	2	0
2014	Finland	OLY	6	4	2	6	4
Junior totals			13	12	14	26	18
Senior totals			96	54	48	102	48

== Awards and achievements ==
National Hockey League
Award	Year	Ref.
Calder Memorial Trophy	1993	
NHL All-Rookie Team	1993	
First team All-Star	1993; 1997	
Played in NHL All-Star Game	1993, 1994; 1996, 1997; 1998, 1999; 2000, 2002; 2003, 2007	
Second Team All-Star	1998; 1999	
Maurice "Rocket" Richard Trophy	1999	
Bill Masterton Memorial Trophy	2006	
Stanley Cup champion	2007	
Winnipeg Jets Hall of Fame	2022	

Finland
Award	Year	Ref.
Finnish Jr. A League Champion	1988	
Raimo Kilpiö trophy	1991	
SM-liiga All-Star team	1991; 1992	
Aarne Honkavaara trophy	1992	
SM-liiga Kanada-malja Champion	1992	
Finnish ice hockey player of the year	1993, 1996; 1997, 1998; 1999, 2000; 2006, 2012; 2014	

International
Award	Year	Ref.
EJC All-Star team	1988	
Izvestia Trophy (3rd place)	1989	
World Championship Most Valuable Player	1999	
World Championship All-Star team	1999	
Best Forward of the Olympic Games	2006	
Olympic All-Star team	2006, 2014	
Most Valuable Player of the Olympic Games	2014	
Hockey Hall of Fame	2017	
IIHF Hall of Fame	2017	

== Records ==
Career
Record	Total	Ref.
NHL record most goals by a rookie	76, 1992–93	
NHL record most points by a rookie	132, 1992–93	
NHL record, most goals by a Finnish-born player, career	684	
NHL record, most points by a Finnish-born player, career	1,457	
Wpg/Ari franchise record most goals, single season	76, 1992–93	
Wpg/Ari franchise record most points, single season	132, 1992–93	
Wpg/Ari franchise record consecutive games with a goal	9, March 15 – April 1, 1993	
Anaheim franchise record most goals, career	457	
Anaheim franchise record most goals, single season	52, 1997–98	
Anaheim franchise record most assists, career	531	
Anaheim franchise record second most points, career	988	
Anaheim franchise record most points, single season	109, 1996–97	
Anaheim Ducks' first ever playoff goal	1997	
Anaheim franchise record most power play goals, career	182	
Anaheim franchise record most power play assists, career	224 (as of 2012–13)	
Anaheim franchise record most power play points, career	402 (as of 2012–13)	
Anaheim franchise record most games played, career	966	
Anaheim franchise record most hat tricks, career	13	
Anaheim franchise record consecutive games with a goal	11, October 21 – November 10, 1997	
Anaheim franchise record most assists, single game	5, three times	
Most points in Olympic competition, career	43	

Preceded by Bryan Marchment	Winnipeg Jets first-round draft pick 1988	Succeeded by Stu Barnes
Preceded by Jukka Tammi	Winner of the Kultainen kypärä trophy 1990–91	Succeeded by Mikko Mäkelä
Preceded by Juha Järvenpää	Winner of the Raimo Kilpiö trophy 1990–91	Succeeded by Keijo Säilynoja
Preceded by Arto Javanainen	Winner of the Aarne Honkavaara trophy 1991–92	Succeeded by Tomas Kapusta
Preceded by Pavel Bure	Winner of the Calder Memorial Trophy; 1993	Succeeded by Martin Brodeur
Preceded by Brett Hull	NHL goal leader 1993; With: Alexander Mogilny	Succeeded by Pavel Bure
Preceded by Keith Tkachuk	NHL goal leader 1998; With: Peter Bondra	Succeeded by Pavel Bure
Preceded by Award created	Winner of the Maurice "Rocket" Richard Trophy; 1999	Succeeded by Pavel Bure
Preceded by Paul Kariya	Mighty Ducks of Anaheim captain 1998; While Paul Kariya was injured and out of the lineup	Succeeded by Paul Kariya
Preceded by Jarmo Myllys	Winner of the President's trophy (Finland); 1997–98	Succeeded by Saku Koivu
Preceded by Bryan Berard	Winner of the Bill Masterton Memorial Trophy; 2006	Succeeded by Phil Kessel
