= Kumman kaa =

- Genre: Comedy
- Written by: Minna Koskela; Heli Sutela
- Directed by: Johanna Vuoksenmaa; Lauri Nurkse
- Starring: Minna Koskela; Heli Sutela; Ilkka Merivaara
- Country of origin: Finland
- Original language: Finnish
- No. of seasons: 2
- No. of episodes: 20

Production
- Executive producer: Liisa Akimof
- Cinematography: Rike Jokela
- Running time: 20–24 minutes
- Production company: Production House

Original release
- Network: Nelonen
- Release: February 24, 2003 – January 31, 2005

Kumman kaa (With which one) is a Finnish television comedy series that aired on Nelonen from 2003 to 2005. The series was written by Minna Koskela and Heli Sutela, who also played the lead roles. The first season was directed by Johanna Vuoksenmaa, and the second season by Lauri Nurkse. The music was composed by the band Aavikko.

== Overview ==
The first season of the series was filmed in 2001 but was not broadcast until February 24, 2003.

The series has been rebroadcast multiple times and is available on the Ruutu streaming platform. It has been released on two double-DVD sets. Koskela and Sutela also wrote a companion book titled Kumman kaa: Perusasiat haltuun (Nemo, 2005).

In 2010, Koskela and Sutela launched a stage tour based on the series, titled Kummanki kaa ja mukana myös Vesa, which premiered on March 15. The show continued the story from where the second season ended and featured Ilkka Merivaara.

The series won the Telvis award for Best Drama Program in 2004.

== Plot ==
The series follows Anne, a Swedish teacher, and Ellu, a school nurse, as they navigate life in Helsinki. Both work at the same school, spending much of their time in Ellu's office rather than attending to their professional duties. They frequently discuss their personal lives and devise plans for various leisure activities. A recurring source of annoyance is the school psychologist, Tarja, with whom they have a contentious relationship. Anne's brother, Vesa, a journalist, often provides insight into their dilemmas. They also spend considerable time at their favorite bar, Eino, where they ponder relationships over drinks.

Anne and Vesa are originally from Sipoo. Though Vesa often helps Anne and Ellu out of tricky situations, they frequently exclaim, "Vesa doesn't get it!" when he disagrees with their antics. In the series finale, Anne is appointed principal of the Ruoholahti junior high school, where Ellu also secures a transfer as the school nurse.

== Cast ==
=== Main cast ===
- Minna Koskela as Ellu Jokinen
- Heli Sutela as Anne Nyberg
- Ilkka Merivaara as Vesa Nyberg

=== Recurring cast ===
- Robin Svartström as Aki
- Tiina Pirhonen as Tarja
- Sari Viitasalo as Marjo
- Susanna Mikkonen as Elisabeth
- Eppu Salminen as Vexi
- Juha Veijonen as Pertsa
- Antti Tammela as Rami
- Kari-Pekka Toivonen as Cajander
- José Hellström as Johnny
- Osmo Jokinen as Miku
- Hannu-Pekka Björkman as Mika
- Jarkko Pajunen as Markku
- Esa-Matti Pölhö as Kaitsu
- Pamela Tola as Mimmi
- Jakob Öhrman as Joonas
- Viktor Idman as Jesse
- Tommi Eronen as Harri
- Jarkko Nyman as Timo
- Antti Pääkkönen as Kipsakas
- Jouko Puolanto as Jore
- Seppo Halttunen as Marko
- Pauliina Hukkanen as Auli
- Janne Virtanen as Bar Eino's owner
- Kari Ketonen as Jujutsu instructor
- Riitta Havukainen as Ulla-Maija
- Jarkko Niemi as a student
