= Malla Malmivaara =

Finnish actress and singer (born 1982)

- Born: Laura Malmivaara; 10 December 1982 (age 43); Jyväskylä, Finland
- Other names: Malla; Belle Who; Laura Malmberg
- Occupations: Actress, singer
- Years active: 2005–present
- Relatives: Olli Malmivaara (second cousin); Laura Malmivaara (second cousin)

Malla Malmivaara (born Laura Malmivaara on 10 December 1982), performing under the stage name Malla and formerly Belle Who, is a Finnish actress and singer.

== Early life ==
Malmivaara was born in Jyväskylä in 1982, and was raised there. Her name at birth was Laura Malmivaara, but she uses the name Malla to avoid confusion with her second cousin, actress and singer Laura Malmivaara. She is of Sámi descent, through her grandfather. Her second cousin is ice hockey player Olli Malmivaara.

== Film career ==
Malmivaara made her acting debut at the age of four, on stage in the Jyväskylä City Theatre. She has performed in numerous films and TV shows. In 2018, she was nominated for a Jussi Award for her role in the movie Kaiken se kestää.

== Musical career ==
Malmivaara previously performed in the band Elisabeth Underground and released music under the name Belle Who, but currently performs under the name Malla, under which she has released two albums.

== Personal life ==
Malmivaara lives in Helsinki. She has two sons with her partner, musician Boris Nordin.

== Selected filmography ==
Film
Year	Title	Role	Notes
2009	Forbidden Fruit		
2010	The Hustlers		
2011	Dirty Bomb		
2017	Star Boys (Kaiken se kestää)		

TV
Year	Title	Role	Notes
2013	Nymphs		
2014–2016	Mustat lesket	Kirsi Lundberg	

== Partial discography ==
=== Albums ===
- Can't Whistle When You Smile (as Belle Who, 2009)
- Malla (as Malla, 2021)
- Fresko (as Malla, 2023)
