= Lakeside Murders =

Finnish television series

- Koskinen
- Genre: Crime drama; Nordic noir
- Created by: Riku Suokas
- Directed by: Lauri Nurkse; Riku Suokas
- Starring: Eero Aho; Maria Ylipää; Turkka Mastomäki; Jon-Jon Geitel
- Country of origin: Finland
- Original language: Finnish
- No. of seasons: 4
- No. of episodes: 40

Production
- Running time: 43 minutes
- Production company: Aito Media Oy

Original release
- Network: Ruutu+
- Release: 29 November 2021

Lakeside Murders (Finnish: Koskinen) is a Finnish crime drama and Nordic noir television series created by Riku Suokas and starring Eero Aho. The series is based on the Koskinen book series by Seppo Jokinen and follows Inspector Sakari Koskinen and his team in the Violent Crimes Unit as they try to solve murders in the Finnish lakeside city of Tampere.

Lakeside Murders is produced for Nelonen by Aito Media Oy. Filming of the series began in October 2020 in Tampere, Finland. The first season, which consisted of ten episodes, premiered in Finland on 29 November 2021 on Ruutu+ streaming service. Season two premiered on 15 June 2022. The series has been licensed to North America, Australia and Latvia.

== Overview ==
The series follows Inspector Sakari Koskinen and his team in the Violent Crime Unit of the Central Finland Police Department in Tampere. Koskisen's diverse team includes Ulla Lundelin, a mother of three who treats alcohol stress; Risto Pekki, who uses Tinder diligently; and the passionate Ilves fan Markku Kaatio. Half a year has passed since the events of the first season. The bomb that exploded at the wedding of Luttinen and Taru has left its mark, and the author, Kai Hurme, has fled abroad, avoiding the police. During the season, Koskinen and the team will face a series of drownings, a series of strange persecutions in the neighborhood of Kaleva's "Great Wall of China", a cycle of exploitation and vengeful violence across the country, and the head of a man found on the stairs of Tampere City Hall.

== Cast and characters ==
=== Main ===
- Eero Aho as Inspector Sakari Koskinen
- Maria Ylipää as Ulla Lundelin
- Turkka Mastomäki as Risto Pekki
- Jon-Jon Geitel as Markku Kaatio

=== Recurring ===
- Pertti Sveholm as Roine
- Petra Karjalainen as Raija Koskinen
- Samuel Kujala as Antti Koskinen
- Mari Turunen as Tanse Niiranen
- Martti Syrjä as Hokka

== Episodes ==
Series	Episodes	Originally released	
Series	Episodes	First released	Last released
1	10	29 November 2021	24 January 2022
2	10	15 June 2022	10 August 2022
3	10	7 June 2023	9 August 2023

=== Season 1 (2021–2022) ===
No. overall	No. in season	Title	Directed by	Written by	Original release date
1	1	(Finnish: Raadonsyöjä, osa 1)	Lauri Nurkse	Riku Suokas, Heikki Syrjä	29 November 2021
A genius designer is found murdered in a control center of the Tampere tramway. There seems to be plenty of secrets between the people at the center.
2	2	(Finnish: Raadonsyöjä, osa 2)	Lauri Nurkse	Riku Suokas, Heikki Syrjä	29 November 2021
A computer virus has been attached to the Tampere tramway control. Virus messes up the entire test-phase operation of the tramway and causes a power outage.
3	3	(Finnish: Siimamies, osa 1)	Riku Suokas	Riku Suokas, Heikki Syrjä	6 December 2021
As if Koskinen wasn't busy enough, a nightmare scenario takes place in the Hervanta area, Tampere: a 16-year-old girl is found strangled with a fishing line.
4	4	(Finnish: Siimamies, osa 2)	Riku Suokas	Riku Suokas, Heikki Syrjä	13 December 2021
Concurrent to the investigation, the girl's father flies into a vengeful rage, starting his own investigation on the matter.
5	5	(Finnish: Pudotuspeli, osa 1)	Riku Suokas	Riku Suokas, Heikki Syrjä	20 December 2021
Koskinen has been promoted to Chief Inspector and faces his first challenges in his position when a bank robbery ends in a sudden gunshot.
6	6	(Finnish: Pudotuspeli, osa 2)	Riku Suokas	Riku Suokas, Heikki Syrjä	27 December 2021
Koskinen's former colleague Roine has been admitted to a mental hospital. When the patients start to die of strange heart attacks, the old criminal investigator's suspicions are aroused.
7	7	(Finnish: Hukan enkelit, osa 1)	Lauri Nurkse	Riku Suokas, Heikki Syrjä	3 January 2022
The Violent Crimes Department is put in a tough spot when an unknown body turns up in the west side of Tampere. He had no chance of escaping the attacker because he was in a wheelchair.
8	8	(Finnish: Hukan enkelit, osa 2)	Lauri Nurkse	Riku Suokas, Heikki Syrjä	10 January 2022
A peculiar gang of disabled men have made the assisted living centre their home. Soon another attack takes place and a terminally ill woman, has no chance to escape from the killer's clutches.
9	9	(Finnish: Piripolkka, osa 1)	Lauri Nurkse	Riku Suokas, Heikki Syrjä	7 January 2022
An old man is beaten within an inch of his life in the Nekala area of Tampere and arson takes place in Hervanta. The main suspects are a teen gang. Soon one of the gang members turns up dead.
10	10	(Finnish: Piripolkka, osa 2)	Lauri Nurkse	Riku Suokas, Heikki Syrjä	24 January 2022
Chief inspector Koskinen and his team start investigating this senseless series of crimes. It is not an easy assignment, and it also causes distress in the youth caught up in the situation.

=== Season 2 (2022) ===
No. overall	No. in season	Title	Directed by	Written by	Original release date
11	1	(Finnish: Vilpittömässä mielessä, osa 1)	Lauri Nurkse	Riku Suokas, Heikki Syrjä	15 June 2022
The body of a drowned man is dragged up from the Tammerkoski rapids. Although the man was found in Lake Näsijärvi, he was not drowned in lake water but well water, and the marks found on his wrists are determined to be caused by a rope.
12	2	(Finnish: Vilpittömässä mielessä, osa 2)	Lauri Nurkse	Riku Suokas, Heikki Syrjä	20 June 2022
Koskinen and his son are sailing near the area where the first body was found and Koskinen gets an idea and goes to investigate a nearby cluster of islands. Koskinen unwittingly puts Antti in great danger.
13	3	(Finnish: Viha on paha vieras, osa 1)	Lauri Nurkse	Riku Suokas, Heikki Syrjä	22 June 2022
An uninvited guest visits people's flats and leaves behind threatening messages. A resident who has been stalking and terrorizing his neighbours is found killed in his flat. Almost every resident in the house has a motive.
14	4	(Finnish: Viha on paha vieras, osa 2)	Lauri Nurkse	Riku Suokas, Heikki Syrjä	29 June 2022
As the investigation progresses, only a few suspects remain. A young girl's tragic suicide in another part of the city indirectly provides Koskinen with the missing piece of the puzzle.
15	5	(Finnish: Hiirileikki, osa 1)	Unknown	Riku Suokas, Heikki Syrjä	6 July 2022
A bachelor living a quiet life has been stabbed in his flat and he swears he did not know the attacker. Koskinen gets on the trail of crimes that have been committed all over Finland in which lonely men have died or gone missing.
16	6	(Finnish: Hiirileikki, osa 2)	Unknown	Riku Suokas, Heikki Syrjä	13 July 2022
The perpetrators turn out to be two women swindling money from lonely men. The women are not only driven by a lust for money but also their desire to take revenge on their victims for the humiliations they suffered in their previous lives.
17	7	(Finnish: Sana sanaa vastaan, osa 1)	Riku Suokas	Riku Suokas, Heikki Syrjä	20 July 2022
Environmentalist opposing to an artificial lake that's being planned in Lake Näsijärvi demonstrate against the project and go on hunger strike. The demonstrators are attacked violently.
18	8	(Finnish: Sana sanaa vastaan, osa 2)	Riku Suokas	Riku Suokas, Heikki Syrjä	27 July 2022
Koskinen finds out the spiral of violence related to the case began years ago. The Mayor's twin brother has gone missing. The case gets a horrifying twist when a severed finger is found between the pages of the Constitution of Finland.
19	9	(Finnish: Suurta pahaa, osa 1)	Unknown	Riku Suokas, Heikki Syrjä	3 August 2022
The finger found in the library belongs to the mayor's brother. A headless body is found at the foot of the Mannerheim monument. The police receive a threat about five bombs having been armed around Tampere.
20	10	(Finnish: Suurta pahaa, osa 2)	Unknown	Riku Suokas, Heikki Syrjä	10 August 2022
The retired Roine gets interested in the case, finds the group behind the acts and gets captured by them. The group intends to execute the mayor of Tampere at the town hall square and live stream their declaration of war online.

=== Season 3 (2023) ===
No. overall	No. in season	Title	Directed by	Written by	Original release date
21	1	(Finnish: Ajomies, osa 1)	Riku Suokas	Riku Suokas, Heikki Syrjä	7 June 2023
Well known crime reporter is found murdered in cold blood.
22	2	(Finnish: Ajomies, osa 2)	Riku Suokas	Riku Suokas, Heikki Syrjä	14 June 2023
Memos left by Vanninen lead Koskinen and his team deeper to the exposure the crime reporter was working on. Trail lead Koskikeskus, where gunfight breaks out between police and Estonian mafia.
23	3	(Finnish: Kuka sellaista tekisi, osa 1)	Tommi Lepola	Riku Suokas, Heikki Syrjä	21 July 2023
Substance abuser is found dead in Hervanta. Koskinen suspects murder, but is alone with his theory.
24	4	(Finnish: Kuka sellaista tekisi, osa 2)	Tommi Lepola	Riku Suokas, Heikki Syrjä	28 June 2023
Investigation leads to Hervanta underworld. Koskinen gets on trail of killer, when man helping substance abusers is burned alive.
25	5	(Finnish: Räätälöity ratkaisu, osa 1)	Riku Suokas	Riku Suokas, Heikki Syrjä	5 July 2023
String of robberies by street gangs take place in downtown and one gang member is found dead. Cruel cause of death is shocking to Koskinen's team.
26	6	(Finnish: Räätälöity ratkaisu, osa 2)	Riku Suokas	Riku Suokas, Heikki Syrjä	12 July 2023
While investigating the boy's death Koskinen also has to deal with spiral of revenge between two businessmen. The cases are intertwined in a surprising way.
27	7	(Finnish: Vihan sukua, osa 1)	Tommi Lepola	Riku Suokas, Heikki Syrjä	19 July 2023
Bomb explodes in an election event in Pispala. Head of Tampere branch of Suojelupoliisi is certain of terrorist intent behind it.
28	8	(Finnish: Vihan sukua, osa 2)	Tommi Lepola	Riku Suokas, Heikki Syrjä	26 July 2023
Koskinen doesn't believe Rusinpää's terrorism assumption. Security of elections is threatened and the President is visiting Tampere.
29	9	(Finnish: Hervantalainen, osa 1)	Lauri Nurkse	Riku Suokas, Heikki Syrjä	2 August 2023
Pekki's upcoming wedding is a cause of stress. Meanwhile, police have difficulty comprehending the motive of gruesome string of assaults and murders made using a crowbar. Amid all Koskinen has strained relationship with his son.
30	10	(Finnish: Hervantalainen, osa 2)	Lauri Nurkse	Riku Suokas, Heikki Syrjä	9 August 2023
Koskinen finds out that he has information leak in his team. However he makes progress on the case of masked serial killer putting himself and his family on mortal danger.

== See also ==
- Bordertown
