= Wuolijoki =

Wuolijoki is a Finnish surname. Notable people with the surname include:

- Hella Wuolijoki (1886–1954), Estonian writer
- Juha Wuolijoki, Finnish producer and director
- Wäinö Wuolijoki (1872–1947), Finnish politician

See also:

- Vuolijoki, former municipality of Finland, now part of Kajaani
