= Ricky Rapper and the Nighthawk =

Ricky Rapper and the Night Hawk
- Directed by: Timo Koivusalo
- Written by: Sinikka Nopola; Tiina Nopola; Timo Koivusalo
- Based on: The book Risto Räppääjä ja yöhaukka by Sinikka and Tiina Nopola
- Produced by: Timo Koivusalo
- Starring: Samuel Shipway; Sanni Paatso; Vesa Vierikko; Minttu Mustakallio; Riitta Havukainen
- Music by: Esa Nieminen
- Production company: Artista Filmi Oy
- Distributed by: The Walt Disney Company Nordic
- Release date: 19 February 2016
- Running time: 72 minutes
- Country: Finland
- Language: Finnish
- Budget: €1,600,000 (Finnish Film Foundation support: €800,000)

Ricky Rapper and the Night Hawk (Finnish: Risto Räppääjä ja yöhaukka) is a Finnish children's film directed by Timo Koivusalo, released on February 19, 2016. It is based on the book of the same name by Sinikka and Tiina Nopola (2015).

== Plot ==
While digging for fishing worms, Risto Räppääjä discovers a treasure, leading to an archaeological excavation at the site. When an Iron Age ring from the excavation goes missing, it seems certain that the elusive Night Hawk, a grave robber, is nearby. The story takes a surprising turn when Rauha Räppääjä becomes entangled in the case, and Lennart Lindberg ends up wrongfully jailed. Determined to clear Lennart's name, Risto embarks on an international adventure to track down the Night Hawk.

== Cast ==
- Samuel Shipway as Ricky Rapper
- Sanni Paatso as Nelly Noodlehead
- Vesa Vierikko as Leonard Lindberg
- Minttu Mustakallio as Rauha Rapper
- Riitta Havukainen as Elvi Rapper
- Laura Malmivaara as Archaeologist Klaudia Kämäräinen
- Ville Myllyrinne as Male Police Officer
- Rinna Paatso as Female Police Officer
- Emily Shipway as Young Elvi Rapper

== Production ==
Filming took place in summer 2015, including scenes shot at Villilä Studios in Nakkila, Herrankukkaro in Rymättylä, and the old town of Naantali. Ricky Rapper and the Nighthawk is the sixth installment in the Ricky Rapper series. Like the previous two films, it was produced by Artista Filmi.
