= The Interrogation (film) =

- Theatrical release poster
- Finnish: Kuulustelu
- Directed by: Jörn Donner
- Written by: Olli Soinio
- Produced by: Jörn Donner; Misha Jaari; Mark Lwoff
- Starring: Minna Haapkylä
- Cinematography: Pirjo Honkasalo
- Distributed by: Walt Disney Studios Motion Pictures Finland
- Release date: 25 September 2009
- Running time: 110 minutes
- Country: Finland
- Language: Finnish

The Interrogation (Finnish: Kuulustelu) is a 2009 Finnish war drama film directed by Jörn Donner.

The plot focuses on the interrogation of Kerttu Nuorteva (played by Minna Haapkylä, who won the Jussi Award for best lead actress for her performance) during the Continuation War.

== Cast ==
- Minna Haapkylä as Kerttu Nuorteva
- Marcus Groth as Paavo Kastari
- Hannu-Pekka Björkman as Toivo Suominen
- Lauri Nurkse as Otto Kumenius
- Kristiina Elstelä as Mrs. Grahn
- Rea Mauranen as Dr. Schwanck
- Pertti Sveholm as Arvo Tuominen
- Mikko Reitala as Arno Anthoni
