= Christmas Story (film) =

- Film poster
- Finnish: Joulutarina
- Directed by: Juha Wuolijoki
- Written by: Marko Leino
- Produced by: Juha Wuolijoki
- Starring: Hannu-Pekka Björkman; Otto Gustavsson; Kari Väänänen; Minna Haapkylä; Mikko Leppilampi; Mikko Kouki
- Cinematography: Mika Orasmaa
- Music by: Leri Leskinen
- Release date: 16 November 2007
- Running time: 83 minutes
- Country: Finland
- Language: Finnish
- Box office: $4.3 million

Christmas Story (Finnish: Joulutarina) is a 2007 Finnish Christmas drama film directed by Juha Wuolijoki. It is the story of how an orphan called Nikolas became Santa Claus.

== Plot ==
Many years ago, in Lapland, a boy named Nikolas is orphaned when his parents and younger sister Aada are killed in an accident. The heads of the families in the village meet to decide his future and, as life in the arctic is difficult, it is decided that as no one family could care for him permanently, they would raise Nikolas communally, with each family taking him for one year, starting on Christmas Day, and then moving him on to the next. Grateful, Nikolas begins whittling toys out of wood as a gift which, each Christmas, he leaves for the family that cared for him. It becomes a tradition from then, with Nikolas never forgets the children of those families that received him each year. However, when a blight hits the village and none of the families can afford to take him in for the next year, Nikolas is taken in by a grumpy hermit carpenter named Iisakki, becoming his apprentice. Iisakki works him hard, but Nikolas is clever and quick to learn, and Iisakki gradually grows to love Nikolas as his own son. Nikolas begins to live more and more for the spirit of Christmas with each passing year and it becomes his life, and as he grows old, Nikolas becomes the figure known as Santa Claus.

== Cast ==
- Hannu-Pekka Björkman – Nikolas
- Otto Gustavsson – Young Nikolas
- Kari Väänänen – Iisakki
- Minna Haapkylä – Kristiina
- Mikko Leppilampi – Hannus
- Mikko Kouki – Eemeli
- Laura Birn – Aada
- Antti Tuisku – Mikko
- Matti Ristinen – Einari
- Ville Virtanen – Henrik
- Matti Rasilainen – Hermanni

== See also ==
- Klaus (film), 2019 animation with a similar plot
- List of Christmas films
- Santa Claus in film
