= Laura Malmivaara =

Finnish actress (born 1973)

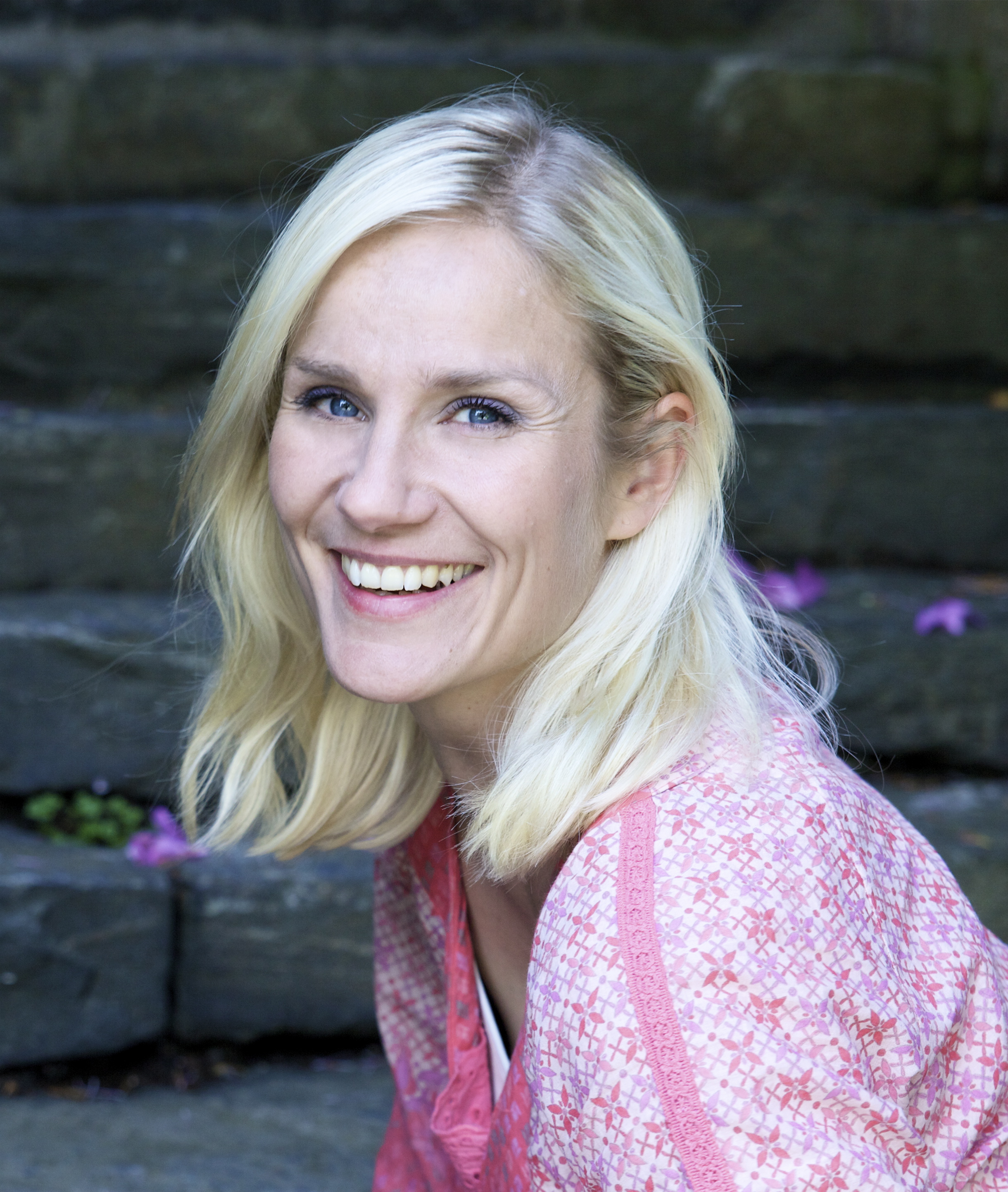
- Malmivaara in 2012
- Born: Laura Pauliina Malmivaara; 26 October 1973 (age 52); Kajaanin maalaiskunta, Finland
- Occupations: Actress, singer, photographer, television host, blogger, model
- Years active: 1993–present (acting career)
- Spouse: Aku Louhimies (m. 2003–2012)
- Relatives: Olli Malmivaara (brother); Malla Malmivaara (second cousin)

Laura Pauliina Malmivaara (born 26 October 1973) is a Finnish actress. Her acting career began in 1993 and includes dozens of roles in film and television productions, as well as stage appearances. In addition to acting, she has also worked as a singer, photographer, television host, blogger, and model.

== Early life and education ==
Laura Pauliina Malmivaara was born on 26 October 1973 into a clerical family in Kajaanin maalaiskunta (now Kajaani), Finland.

Before pursuing acting, she worked as a model in her youth. After graduating from the Sibelius Upper Secondary School in 1992, she lived and worked as a model in Athens, Greece, for a period of time.

In 2002, Malmivaara graduated from the Helsinki Theatre Academy. She also studied photography at the School of Arts, Design and Architecture in Helsinki and theology at the University of Helsinki.

== Career ==
=== Acting ===
==== Screen ====
Malmivaara made her acting debut in the 1993 film Harjunpää and the Persecutors and has since appeared in dozens of Finnish film and television productions. Among her best-known roles are in the films Restless (2002), Lovers & Leavers (2002), Vares: Private Eye (2004) and FC Venus (2005). For her performance in FC Venus, she was nominated for the Best Supporting Actress Award at the 60th Jussi Awards in 2006. Malmivaara is also well known for her role in the drama television series Kotikatu, in which she played the priest Tuija Kangasharju from 2002 to 2012.

In addition to her roles in Finnish productions, Malmivaara has also played lead roles in two Italian films written and directed by Anne Riitta Ciccone: L'amore di Màrja (2002) and Thy Neighbor (2008). She also appeared in the 2006 Swedish comedy film Baba's Cars, written and directed by Rafael Edholm.

In 2025 she played the lead role in hit yle comedy drama series Queen of Fucking Everything, created, written, and directed by Tiina Lymi, for which she won the Lead Actor of the Year award in the Golden Venlas.

==== Stage ====
Malmivaara was a founding member of the theatre group Akseli Ensemble, which was active from 2004 to 2008. Since 2008, she has been affiliated with KOM-teatteri, located in Helsinki.

=== Music ===
Malmivaara's debut album, Myytävänä elämä, was released in 2005 by Elements Music. The ten-track album features pop songs, and both before and after its release, the singles "Nukkumaan" and "Myytävänä elämä" were released in 2005 and 2006, respectively. "Nukkumaan" peaked at number seventeen on the Official Finnish Singles Chart, while "Myytävänä elämä" did not chart. Before her recording career, Malmivaara performed the song "Daa da daa da" with other actors in the film Restless and wrote and performed the song "Sadepilvet" for the film Lovers & Leavers.

=== Photography ===
In addition to her film acting career, Malmivaara has worked as a still photographer for several films. Moreover, three exhibitions featuring her photographic works have been held: Mikä minusta tulee isona (2004), Lauran matkakuvia: Tukholma (2012, 2013) and Taiteilijakuvia (2015).

=== Non-fiction television ===
Malmivaara has hosted two television programs. She hosted Peili, a show based on a board game, which ran for two seasons and aired on MTV3 AVA from 2009 to 2010. From 2012 to 2013, Malmivaara hosted the travel series Lauran matkakuvia: Tukholma, which also ran for two seasons on Liv. In each episode of the series, she travelled to Stockholm, Sweden, with an alternating celebrity guest.

In 2017, Malmivaara participated in the tenth season of Tanssii tähtien kanssa, the Finnish version of Dancing with the Stars, with dancer Mikko Ahti as her partner.

=== Blogging ===
Malmivaara frequently blogged for the women's magazine Evita, published by Bonnier Publications Oy from 2010 to 2013.

== Personal life ==
Malmivaara's younger brother, Olli, is a former professional ice hockey player, and actress and singer Malla Malmivaara (also born Laura Malmivaara) is her second cousin.

Malmivaara has two daughters, born in 2004 and 2006, with director Aku Louhimies, to whom she was married from 2003 to 2012.

== Filmography ==
=== Film ===
Year	Title	Role	Notes
1993	Harjunpää and the Persecutors (Harjunpää ja kiusantekijät)	Model	
1993	The Romanov Stones (Romanovin kivet)	Girl at the party	
2000	Restless (Levottomat)	Tiina	Also performed the song "Daa da daa da" with other actors
2002	Lovers & Leavers (Kuutamolla)	Laura	Also wrote and performed the song "Sadepilvet"
2002	L'amore di Màrja	Màrja	
2003	Young Gods (Hymypoika)	Helena Pääkkönen	
2004	Vares: Private Eye (Vares – yksityisetsivä)	Eeva Sunila	
2004	Uuno Turhapuro – This Is My Life	Television show judge	
2005	Frozen Land (Paha maa)	Social worker	
2005	FC Venus	Carita	
2006	Baba's Cars (Babas bilar)	Elena	
2006	Man Exposed (Riisuttu mies)	Vilma	
2008	Stormheart (Myrsky)	Mother	
2008	Late Fragments	Woman	Short film
2008	Thy Neighbor (Il prossimo tuo)	Eeva	
2009	The Hour of Prayer (Rukoushetki)	Narrator	Short film
2011	Ella & Aleksi (Ella & Aleksi – Yllätyssynttärit)	Hely Huuhkaja	Animated film (voice role)
2013	Open Up to Me (Kerron sinulle kaiken)	Women's shelter's director	
2013	Miten meistä tuli ystäviä	Tiina	Also co-wrote the film
2014	The Island of Secrets (Lomasankarit)	Annika Oksala	
2015	Urban Family (Ollaan vapaita)	Party hostess	
2016	Ricky Rapper and the Nighthawk (Risto Räppääjä ja yöhaukka)	Klaudia Kämäräinen	
2016	Born in Heinola (Teit meistä kauniin)	Mervi Wirtanen	
2017	The Darkness Moment (Pimein hetki)	Elina	Short film
2021	Omerta 6/12	Iiris Huovinen-Lång	

=== Television ===
Year	Title	Role	Notes
1994	Kultainen salama	Janne Mäki's wife	TV series: 1 episode
1994	Love Story	Woman in the sailboat	TV miniseries: 1 episode
1997	Siivoton juttu		TV film
1997	Tähtilampun alla	Annika Leino	TV series: 10 episodes
1998–2000	Samaa sukua, eri maata	Anne Kilappa	TV series: 48 episodes
2002	Jurismia!	Esmeralda	TV series: 2 episodes
2002	Isänmaan toivot	Irina	TV series: 1 episode
2002	Helsingin olympiakisat 1952 – Muistojuhla	Rauhanenkeli	TV special
2002–2012	Kotikatu	Tuija Kangasharju	TV series: 199 episodes
2003	Irtiottoja	Venla	TV series
2003	Me olemme taas	Various characters	TV film
2006	Ranta	Susanna	TV film
2009–2010	Peili	Herself as the host	Two-season game show
2010	SEX ABC, The Secret Files of Dr. Zukovski (Seksin ABC – tri Zukovskin salaiset kansiot)		Animated documentary series (voice role)
2012–2013	Lauran matkakuvia: Tukholma	Herself as the host	Two-season travel series: 20 episodes
2014	Toisen kanssa	Helena Parikka	TV series: 6 episodes
2015–2016	Ihon alla	Essi Salonen	TV series: 12 episodes
2016–2019	Bordertown (Sorjonen)	Anneli Ahola	TV series: 22 episodes
2017	Presidentti	Anna Talvio	TV series: 12 episodes
2017	Tanssii tähtien kanssa	Herself as a competitor	TV dance contest: 10th season
2018	Bullets	Kerttu Kavén	TV series: 9 episodes
2019	Kellot soi	Anne Asikainen-Kariluoma-Ståhlberg	TV series: 10 episodes
2020	All the Sins (Kaikki synnit)	Anu Leinonen	TV series: 6 episodes
2021	Fast (Karkurit)	Maria	TV series: 1 episode
2021	Kentän laidalla	Kristiina Heiskanen	TV series: 8 episodes
2021	Detective Maria Kallio (Maria Kallio)	Katri Tanner	TV series: 1 episode
2021	Dough (Deg)	Karita	TV series: 5 episodes
2021	Karuselli	Kaija Böök	TV series: 2 episodes
2022	Mobile 101 (Made in Finland)	Liisa Ollila	TV series: 2 episodes
2022	Poikani Joel	Roosa	TV miniseries
2022, 2024	Helsinki Syndrome	Anne Laukko	TV series: 14 episodes

=== Still photography ===
Year	Title	Notes
1997	The Blind Spot (Sokea piste)	Feature film
2000	Restless (Levottomat)	Feature film
2003	Irtiottoja	Television series
2006	Frozen City (Valkoinen kaupunki)	Feature film
2006	Man Exposed (Riisuttu mies)	Feature film
2008	Tears of April (Käsky)	Feature film
2012	Hush (Ja saapuu oikea yö)	Feature film
2017	Kuudes kerta	Feature film

== Discography ==
=== Albums ===
- Myytävänä elämä (2005)

=== Singles ===
- "Nukkumaan" (2005) – peaked at #17 on the Official Finnish Singles Chart
- "Myytävänä elämä" (2006)

== Photography exhibitions ==
- Mikä minusta tulee isona (2004)
- Lauran matkakuvia: Tukholma (2012, 2013)
- Taiteilijakuvia (2015)
