= Zarra's Law =

- Film poster
- Directed by: Juha Wuolijoki
- Written by: Joseph Scarpinito; Charles Kipps
- Starring: Tony Sirico; Brendan Fehr; Erin Cummings; Kathrine Narducci
- Production company: Scarpe Diem Productions
- Release date: June 11, 2014
- Countries: United States; Finland

Zarra's Law is a 2014 American police procedural film that made its world premiere in the director's home country Finland on June 11, 2014. The film stars Tony Sirico as retired detective Tony Zarra, who gets pushed into the world of crime after the murder of his younger brother. The film was written by Joseph Scarpinito and Charles Kipps and directed by Juha Wuolijoki, produced by Scarpe Diem Productions. The ensemble cast features actors Brendan Fehr, Erin Cummings and Kathrine Narducci. In the film, Tony's love for his brother and family makes it harder for him to let go. Moreover, Tony is faced with the stress of his brother's convicted killer being released from prison early.

== Plot ==
Zarra's Law is about two brothers on opposing sides of law. Tony Zarra being a successful retired seasoned police officer, Roberto being a Capo with the Mob.

After the death Roberto, who falls victim to a car bomb, his violent death breaks apart the Zarra family. When his son Gaetano shows up to his funeral dressed in full military attire, he shows he was disgusted by his father's way of life; this causes a sudden disappearance of Roberto's son. He leaves to join the army while his grandmother seeks alleviation in alcohol. Tony Zarra goes into retirement following his brother's funeral.

Two years pass and Leo, the bartender, tells Tony Bobby Stax is being released with an early parole from his eight-year sentence. Tony then finds himself forced back into the criminal world to seek revenge for his brother's death. Stax's release also pushes Gaetano's return from service and becomes a lawyer for his uncle's investigation of Roberto's organized death.

== Cast ==
Tony Sirico as Tony Zarra: a retired police officer who was seen as highly successful during his employment. Has a close relationship with his nephew and sees him as a son.

Brendan Fehr as Gaetano: Tony Zarra's nephew and Roberto's son, Tony's deceased brother. Shortly after his father's death he had disappeared, but comes back help his uncle face the injustice of the family.

Wass Stevens as Bobby Stax: an ambitious mobster who's convicted in murdering Roberto and is sent to prison.

Erin Cummings as Crystal: a bartender at the local mob hotspot, begins dating Gaetano, and is very possessive.

== Production ==
=== Filming ===
Filming locations for this film was shot around New York City, such as the Clinton Diner in Maspeth, Queens and in scattered places about Manhattan.

== Box office ==
Zarra's Law was first premiered at Finland's Midnight Sun Film Festival on June 11, 2014. It was later released in Sweden on December 28 via TV premiere.
