= Restless (2000 film) =

- Theatrical release poster
- Directed by: Aku Louhimies
- Written by: Aku Louhimies; Aleksi Bardy
- Produced by: Markus Selin
- Starring: Mikko Nousiainen; Laura Malmivaara
- Cinematography: Mac Ahlberg
- Edited by: Samu Heikkilä
- Music by: Leri Leskinen
- Production company: Solar Films
- Distributed by: Buena Vista International
- Release date: 28 January 2000
- Running time: 111 minutes
- Country: Finland
- Language: Finnish

Restless (Finnish: Levottomat) is a 2000 Finnish romantic film directed by Aku Louhimies. It was entered into the 22nd Moscow International Film Festival. The sex scenes in the film sparked uproar and disapproval from the audience and critics after the release. Critic Antti Lindqvist wrote in Katso (5/2000) that the director throws more sex scenes and naked women and men on the screen more than anyone since Lauri Törhönen's 1986 film The Undressing.

Restless was followed by Me and Morrison (2001) and Addiction (2004). Restless was co-written by Louhimies and Aleksi Bardy, but they did not participate in the sequels.

== Plot ==
The film is about Ari, a 27-year-old ambulance doctor with a terminally ill mother. One-night stands are his main pastime. He does not want to meet any of the girls again because he is certain that commitment equals pain. But one day Ari realises that he cannot feel anything at all. Then he meets a woman named Tiina on the beach. That same day they have sex in Ari's apartment and Tiina enters her phone number into Ari's in order to exchange contact details. At first Ari ignores Tiina's attempts to phone him to the amusement of his married colleague, Roope. Ari subsequently relents and they start dating each other reaching the point where Tiina, falling in love, begins to look for commitment. However, on Ari's birthday when Tiina brings him a cake to his apartment she arrives as another woman is leaving. Nonetheless she decides to maintain the relationship with him though expressing her desire for exclusivity.

Ari is later introduced to Tiina's friends who include two other couples, Ilona an archaeologist who is dating Stig and Hanna-Riikka a priest who is dating and living with Riku. This introduction takes place as the five pre-existing companions sail to an island to celebrate the Mid-Summer Festival. During this holiday the six have a conversation in which Hanna-Riikka states that man is nothing without belief to which Ari immediately responds: "Then that must mean I am an ape". The others laugh and Hanna-Riikka walks out. Ilona shows a clear interest in Ari and later initiates a sexual encounter with him. This affair continues for an unspecified length of time during which Ari and Tiina move in together and Hanna-Riikka confronts Ari with her suspicions of what is happening between him and Ilona. When these are confirmed Hanna-Rikka also confronts Ilona about her behaviour and is accused of being a hypocritical lesbian. When the Ilona and Ari decide to have one last episode of intercourse they are discovered by Stig who tells Tiina about the affair and Ari moves out. Riku offers him use of his couch much to Hanna-Riikka's displeasure. Meanwhile, Tiina discovers that she is pregnant and later gets a commitment from Ari to resume the relationship with the aim of being a responsible father to their child.

Late one night Ari is called to Roope's house because his heavy drinking has precipitated the breakdown of his marriage to Piia. Ari arrives to find Roope with a bottle of spirits and his revolver. After Roope tells him about the fallout of his alcoholism, Ari says that Piia is actually outside sulking in the front garden. Roope asks Ari to talk to his wife because he considers Ari more knowledgeable about how to talk to women and gives Ari his revolver to prevent him from killing himself. Later, when Ari goes to his old apartment Tiina tells him that the hospital has called to inform him of his mother's death. The pair attends the funeral together.

Then the film progresses to Tiina and Ilona reconciling, as do Ari and Stig who asks Ari to be his best man as the affair with Ilona apparently helped clarify Stig's perspective of the relationship to the point where marriage appeared feasible. The wedding is to be officiated by Hanna-Riikka, who by now has separated from Riku, and to be held on the island where the six earlier holidayed. During one of the drinking games they usually engage in, Hanna-Rikka states that she has never climaxed during sexual intercourse prompting Riku to walk out and the two are later seen arguing. At the reception Ari, in deep contemplation, tells Tiina that they need to talk. Once they are alone Ari states "What are we going to do?" to which Tiina again questions the commitment of Ari by arguing that they should get married. Ari opposes her and says that they should separate. To this, Tiina is shocked, so she proceeds to drink excessively at the wedding prompting Ilona to try stop her. Tiina ends up revealing to the groom that Ari has, in fact, only recently slept with the bride and also the priest. This leads to a confrontation with Ari using the butt of Roope's former revolver to knock both Stig and Riku to the ground and he leaves the reception.

The film ends with narrating Ari's thoughts as he gets away from it all by physically distancing himself by travelling, Tiina has given birth, Ilona is lecturing while Stig and Riku have maintained their friendship. In the last scene Ari returns to a church where Hanna-Riikka is working.

== Cast ==
- Mikko Nousiainen as Ari
- Laura Malmivaara as Tiina
- Petteri Summanen as Stig
- Matleena Kuusniemi as Ilona
- Valtteri Roiha as Riku
- Irina Björklund as Hanna-Riikka
- Samuli Edelmann as Roope
- Vilma Melasniemi as Piia
- Eija Nousiainen as Arin äiti
- Jaana Järvinen as Helena
- Pertti Sveholm as Pera
- Niina Kurkinen as Päivi

== Reception ==
The film had the highest-grossing opening for a Finnish film for over 10 years since The Winter War, grossing $372,337 in its opening week from 54,125 admissions.
