= Jenni Banerjee =

Finnish actress (born 1981)

Jenni Pauliina Banerjee
- Born: 1981 (age 44–45); Ylöjärvi, Finland
- Occupation: Actress

Jenni Pauliina Banerjee (born 1981) is a Finnish actress. She was born in Ylöjärvi, Finland and has appeared in movies such as Pahat pojat (2003), Joensuun Elli (2004) and Lieksa! (2007). Her maternal grandfather is from Calcutta, India.

== Selected filmography ==
=== Film ===
- Luokkajuhla (2002)
- Pahat pojat (2003)
- Hymypoika (2003)
- Joensuun Elli (2004)
- Käenpesä (2004) (one episode)
- Caasha (2005)
- Unna ja Nuuk (2006)
- Lieksa! (2007)
- Blackout (2008)
- Kohtaamisia (2009)
- Harjunpää ja pahan pappi (2010)

=== TV ===
- Syke (2014)
- Salatut elämät (2014)
