= Lovers & Leavers =

2002 Finnish romantic drama film

- Original Finnish film poster
- Directed by: Aku Louhimies
- Written by: Katja Kallio; Aku Louhimies
- Based on: Kuutamolla: Levoton tarina rakastamisesta by Katja Kallio
- Produced by: Jarkko Hentula; Ilkka Y. L. Matila; Marko Röhr
- Starring: Minna Haapkylä; Anna-Leena Härkönen; Laura Malmivaara; Peter Franzén; Matti Ristinen; Pirkko Saisio
- Cinematography: Heikki Färm
- Edited by: Samu Heikkilä
- Music by: Leri Leskinen
- Production company: Matila Röhr Productions
- Distributed by: Columbia TriStar Egmont Film Distributors
- Release date: 1 February 2002 (Finland)
- Running time: 117 minutes
- Country: Finland
- Language: Finnish

Lovers & Leavers (Finnish: Kuutamolla) is a 2002 Finnish romantic drama film directed by Aku Louhimies and co-written by Louhimies and Katja Kallio, based on the novel of the same name by Kallio.

== Synopsis ==
Lovers & Leavers is about Iiris, a 30-year-old bookstore assistant, who meets the man of her dreams.

== Production ==
Kuutamolla (English name: Lovers & Leavers) is a romantic drama film directed and co-written by Finnish screenwriter and director Aku Louhimies. It was co-written by Katja Kallio and Louhimies, based on Kallio's novel Kuutamolla: Levoton tarina rakastamisesta.

Heikki Färm was cinematographer on the film, while Leri Leskinen composed the score. Samu Heikkilä was responsible for editing the film.

The film was produced by Jarkko Hentula, Ilkka Y. L. Matila, and Marko Röhr, through Matila Röhr Productions.

== Cast ==
- Minna Haapkylä as Iiris Vaara
- Anna-Leena Härkönen as Anna
- Laura Malmivaara as Laura
- Peter Franzén as Marko
- Matti Ristinen as Sami
- Mikko Kouki as Jukka
- Pirkko Saisio as Leila Vaara
- Santeri Nuutinen as Santtu
- Rasmus Nuutinen as Tintti
- Veeti Kallio as Mikko
- Linda Zilliacus as Ilona

== Release ==
Lovers & Leavers was premiered in Finnish cinemas on 1 February 2002. It also screened at many international film festivals between 2002 and 2004, including in competition at the 2002 Shanghai International Film Festival in China, the Minneapolis–Saint Paul International Film Festival in the US, and the Taormina Film Festival in Italy.

The film has also been broadcast on Finnish TV channel MTV3 many times, and more recently (2021) on Nelonen.

== Awards ==
Minna Haapkylä won the Silver Dolphin Award for Best Actress at the 2002 Festroia International Film Festival for her role in Kuutamolla.

Other awards, awarded in 2003, include:

- Winner, Best Feature, Cinequest San Jose Film Festival
- Winner, Jury Award in category Best Narrative Feature - Drama, Durango Film Festival
- Nominated, Jussi Awards:
  - Best Actress (Paras naispääosa)
  - Best Editing (Paras leikkaus)
  - Best Film (Vuoden elokuva)
  - Best Set Design (Paras lavastus)
  - Best Supporting Actress (Paras naissivuosa)
- Winner, "Europe Now" prize, Karlovy Vary International Film Festival
