= Armi Alive! =

2015 Finnish drams film

- Theatrical poster
- Finnish: Armi elää!
- Directed by: Jörn Donner
- Written by: Karoliina Lindgren
- Produced by: Misha Jaari; Mark Lwoff
- Starring: Minna Haapkylä; Hannu-Pekka Björkman; Laura Birn
- Cinematography: Hannu-Pekka Vitikainen
- Edited by: Klaus Grabber
- Music by: Pessi Levanto
- Distributed by: Bufo
- Release date: 20 March 2015
- Running time: 84 minutes
- Country: Finland
- Language: Finnish

Armi Alive! (Finnish: Armi elää!) is a 2015 Finnish drama film directed by Jörn Donner. The film is based on the life of Finnish entrepreneur Armi Ratia through years 1949–1968 when she founded the textile and clothing company Marimekko and led it to international success. Written in a form of metafiction, the film follows a theatre group preparing a play of Ratia.

In March 2016 the film received two Jussi Awards, for screenplay by Karoliina Lindgren and scenic design by Otso Linnalaakso.

== Main cast ==
- Minna Haapkylä as Armi Ratia / Maria
- Hannu-Pekka Björkman as Viljo Ratia
- Laura Birn as Leena
- Rea Mauranen as Kerttu
