= The Border (2007 film) =

- Film poster
- Finnish: Raja 1918
- Russian: Граница 1918
- Directed by: Lauri Törhönen
- Written by: Aleksi Bardy; Lauri Törhönen
- Produced by: Jörn Donner; Jarkko Hentula
- Starring: Martin Bahne; Minna Haapkylä; Tommi Korpela; Leonid Mozgovoy; Hannu-Pekka Björkman
- Cinematography: Esa Vuorinen
- Edited by: Kimmo Kohtamäki
- Music by: Sergei Yevtushenko
- Production companies: Border Productions; The Hermitage Bridge Studio; Studio 217
- Distributed by: FS Film
- Release dates: 30 November 2007 (Finland); 17 December 2008 (Russia)
- Running time: 114 minutes
- Countries: Finland; Russia
- Languages: Finnish, Russian, Swedish, German
- Budget: €2.1 million
- Box office: €382,151 (Finland)

The Border (Finnish: Raja 1918, Russian: Граница 1918, romanized: Granitsa 1918, lit. 'Border 1918') is a 2007 Finnish-Russian war drama film directed by Lauri Törhönen. Set in the spring of 1918, right after the Finnish Civil War, the film is about a Finnish officer who is sent to the village of Rajajoki to form a border between Finland and Soviet Russia.

The film's main character Carl von Munck is based on Kai Donner and his experiences during the post-civil war period. His son Jörn Donner is one of the film's producers.

== Cast ==
- Martin Bahne as Carl von Munck
- Minna Haapkylä as Maaria Lintu
- Tommi Korpela as Heikki Kiljunen
- Leonid Mozgovoy as Major Gentsch
- Hannu-Pekka Björkman as Sergeant 1st Class Muranen
- Lauri Nurkse as Lieutenant Suutari
- Orvo Björninen as Doctor Perret
- Pauli Poranen as Edvin Lintu
- Roman Schatz as Major Berner
- Hannu Kahakorpi as General Jyrinkoski
- Eeva Putro as Piika Pietarista
