= Maria Ylipää =

Finnish singer and actress (born 1981)

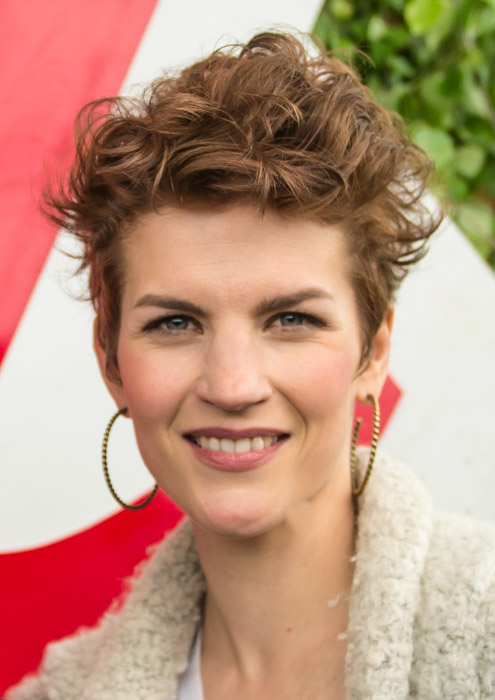
- Ylipää in 2015

Background information
- Born: Maria Mikaela Markuntytär Ylipää; 8 August 1981 (age 44); Ylöjärvi, Finland
- Occupations: Singer; actress

Maria Mikaela Markuntytär Ylipää (born 8 August 1981) is a Finnish singer and actress, who has starred in the musical Kristina från Duvemåla (Helsinki 2012, Göteborg 2014, Stockholm 2015) and acted in the films Keisarikunta (2004) and Pietà (2007). She has also appeared in the television series Rikospoliisi Maria Kallio (2003), Tappajan näköinen mies (2011) and Luottomies (2016) as well as musical theatres Helsinki City Theatre, Tampere Workers' Theatre, Swedish Theatre, Gothenburg opera house and the Stockholm Cirkus.

Ylipää has sung with Jukka Leppilampi, Jiri Kurose and Jarmo Savolainen on their albums and in 2011, on the Dallapé Orchestra album, Soittajan sussu. In spring 2009, she was also present at the music theatre UIT's performances. She has also released the solo album Onerva and made a joint album with Emma Salokoski. Ylipää graduated from Tampere Communal High School in 2000 and acting at the Helsinki Theatre Academy in 2005.

In 2007, Ylipää was first elected as ambassador to the Church of Finland's External Aid together with musician Juha Tapio.

Maria Ylipää's spouse is musician Matti Pentikäinen and they have two children.

== Filmography ==
=== Films ===
- Keisarikunta (2004) – Aila
- Pietà (television film, 2007) – Maria
- Miss Farkku-Suomi (2012) – Kara
- Ollaan vapaita (2015) – Selja
- Tappajan näköinen mies (2016) – Marja Takala

=== Television series ===
- Tappajan näköinen mies (2011) – Marja Takala
- Moska (2011) – seller
- Luottomies (2016, 2017) – Harriet Mäkinen-Renwall
- Aallonmurtaja (2017) – Tuula
- Lakeside Murders (2021, 2022) – Ulla Lundelin

=== Voice roles ===
- Tangled (2011) – Rapunzel
- Helinä-Keiju ja siipien salaisuus (2012) – Fawn
- Helinä-keiju ja Mikä-mikä-hirviön arvoitus (2014) – Fawn
- Helinä-keiju ja merirosvokeiju (2014) – Fawn
- Mary Poppins Returns (2018) – Mary Poppins

== Theatre roles ==
=== Helsinki City Theatre ===
- Cherbourgin sateenvarjot (2002)
- Tuhkimo (2003)
- Miss Saigon (2004)
- Evita (2006)
- Wicked (2010)

=== Tampere Workers' Theatre ===
- Suruttomat

=== Swedish Theatre ===
- Spin (2005)
- Kristina från Duvemåla (2012)
- Chess (2018)

=== Gothenburg Opera ===
- Kristina från Duvemåla (2014)
