= Selänne (film) =

- Promotional poster
- Directed by: JP Siili
- Starring: Teemu Selänne
- Distributed by: SF Film Finland Oy
- Release date: 27 September 2013
- Country: Finland

Selänne (stylized as Sel8nne) is a 2013 documentary film by Finnish director JP Siili about the Finnish professional ice hockey winger Teemu Selänne. The film covers both his professional and personal life.

== Reception ==
Episodi Jani Svensk	3/5 stars
MTV.fi Outi Heiskanen	3/5 stars
Turun Sanomat Kari Salminen	2/5 stars
