= Young Gods (film) =

2003 Finnish film

- Directed by: Jukka-Pekka Siili
- Written by: Jaajo Linnonmaa; Jukka Vieno
- Starring: Jussi Nikkilä; Reino Nordin; Jenni Banerjee
- Distributed by: Picture This! Entertainment
- Release date: 24 October 2003
- Running time: 99 min.
- Country: Finland
- Language: Finnish

Young Gods (Finnish: Hymypoika) is a 2003 film from Finland. The film centres on a group of Finnish teenagers who begin to make videos of themselves and others having sex. Their adventures become more and more extreme, eventually leading to tragic consequences.

It was directed by Jukka-Pekka Siili and stars Jussi Nikkilä.
