= FC Venus =

- Film poster
- Directed by: Joona Tena
- Written by: Outi Keskevaari; Katri Manninen; Joona Tena
- Produced by: Jarkko Hentula; Mikko Tenhunen
- Starring: Minna Haapkylä; Laura Malmivaara; Taneli Mäkelä; Petteri Summanen
- Cinematography: Jarkko T. Laine
- Edited by: Jukka Nykänen
- Music by: Sakari Salli
- Production company: Talent House
- Release date: 30 December 2005 (Finland)
- Running time: 114 minutes
- Country: Finland
- Language: Finnish
- Budget: €1,656,000
- Box office: €1,818,139

FC Venus is a 2005 Finnish romantic comedy film directed by Joona Tena.

A German remake of the film was released in 2006.

== Plot ==
Pete is a football enthusiast, who plays for FC HeMan, a team playing in the lowest possible league. His girlfriend, Anna, hates the whole sport. Pete and his teammates are planning to travel to watch the Football World Cup held in Germany. Anna is not excited about Pete's plan to leave her alone for the summer. Therefore, Anna decides to present a challenge to Pete: She will form a team from the wives and girlfriends of the FC HeMan players, and then the women's team (FC Venus) would play against FC HeMan. If the women's team wins, the men will have to give up football, and if the men's team wins, the women will pay their tickets to the World cup.

== Cast ==
- Minna Haapkylä as Anna
- Petteri Summanen as Pete
- Laura Malmivaara as Carita
- Miia Nuutila as Katariina
- Taneli Mäkelä as Lauri
- Lotta Lehtikari as Mara
- Janne Virtanen as Sebastian
- Eero Tommila as Niko

== See also ==
- List of Finnish films of the 2000s
