= Olli Malmivaara =

Finnish ice hockey player (born 1982)

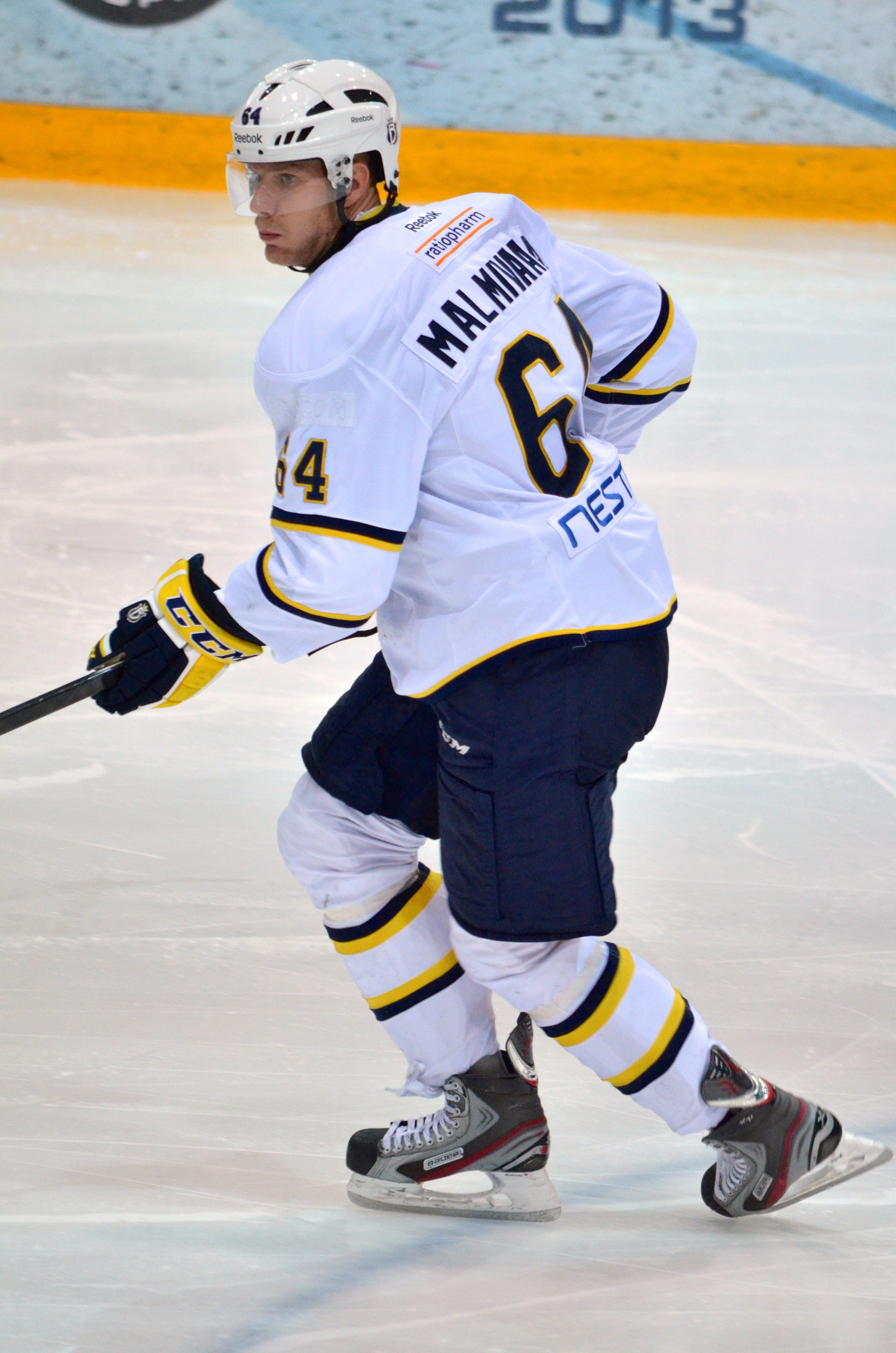
- Born: March 13, 1982 (age 44) Kajaani, Finland
- Height: 6 ft 7 in (201 cm)
- Weight: 230 lb (104 kg; 16 st 6 lb)
- Position: Defenceman
- Shot: Left
- Liiga team Former teams: Espoo Blues; Jokerit; SaiPa; New Jersey Devils; JYP Jyväskylä
- NHL draft: 117th overall, 2000; Chicago Blackhawks
- Playing career: 2000–2016

Olli Malmivaara (born March 13, 1982) is a Finnish former professional ice hockey defenceman. He played in the National Hockey League for the New Jersey Devils.

== Biography ==
As a youth, Malmivaara played in the 1995 Quebec International Pee-Wee Hockey Tournament with a team from Järvenpää.

He later played in Jokerit where he made his SM-liiga debut; in 2003 he signed with SaiPa and spent two years with that team. Malmivaara was drafted by the Chicago Blackhawks as their fourth-round pick, #117 overall, in the 2000 NHL entry draft.

In 2006, he signed with the New Jersey Devils of the National Hockey League (NHL). Malmivaara was a physical defenceman in the Finnish league, where he racked up an average of over 100 penalty minutes a season. The Devils signed him looking for defensive depth in Lowell. He played his first NHL game on October 31, 2007, against the Tampa Bay Lightning in a 6–1 win where he played just over 10 minutes. He would only play one other game in the 2007–08 NHL season, dressing for seven and a half minutes against the Toronto Maple Leafs in a 3–2 win.

As of 2013, he is playing with the Espoo Blues in the Finnish Liiga.

Malmivaara's sister Laura is an actress.

== Career statistics ==
=== Regular season and playoffs ===
			Regular season					Playoffs
Season	Team	League	GP	G	A	Pts	PIM	GP	G	A	Pts	PIM
1997–98	KJT	FIN U16	22	3	7	10	6	—	—	—	—	—
1998–99	Jokerit	FIN U18	35	1	8	9	10	7	0	0	0	2
1999–2000	Jokerit	FIN U18	14	6	6	12	14	1	0	0	0	2
1999–2000	Jokerit	FIN U20	27	3	3	6	12	12	0	2	2	2
2000–01	Jokerit	FIN U20	33	10	13	23	24	2	0	0	0	0
2000–01	Jokerit	SM-liiga	5	0	0	0	2	—	—	—	—	—
2000–01	Kiekko–Vantaa	Mestis	4	1	0	1	2	—	—	—	—	—
2001–02	Jokerit	FIN U20	2	0	1	1	0	—	—	—	—	—
2001–02	Jokerit	SM-liiga	53	0	6	6	16	11	0	0	0	2
2002–03	Jokerit	SM-liiga	42	1	0	1	22	5	0	0	0	0
2002–03	Kiekko–Vantaa	Mestis	2	1	1	2	2	—	—	—	—	—
2003–04	Jokerit	SM-liiga	25	1	0	1	2	—	—	—	—	—
2003–04	SaiPa	SM-liiga	11	1	0	1	6	—	—	—	—	—
2004–05	SaiPa	SM-liiga	56	9	1	10	89	—	—	—	—	—
2005–06	SaiPa	SM-liiga	54	11	9	20	134	8	1	0	1	12
2006–07	Lowell Devils	AHL	60	1	10	11	44	—	—	—	—	—
2007–08	New Jersey Devils	NHL	2	0	0	0	0	—	—	—	—	—
2007–08	Lowell Devils	AHL	57	8	9	17	53	—	—	—	—	—
2008–09	JYP	SM-liiga	57	4	11	15	122	15	2	3	5	20
2009–10	JYP	SM-liiga	52	3	3	6	123	11	0	0	0	18
2010–11	JYP	SM-liiga	58	5	6	11	40	10	0	0	0	10
2011–12	JYP	SM-liiga	60	1	0	1	48	14	2	1	3	4
2012–13	JYP	SM-liiga	45	0	3	3	32	2	0	0	0	2
2013–14	Blues	Liiga	60	1	4	5	42	7	0	0	0	6
2014–15	Blues	Liiga	50	0	4	4	48	—	—	—	—	—
2015–16	Blues	Liiga	5	0	0	0	0	—	—	—	—	—
2015–16	TPS	Liiga	47	1	0	1	40	8	0	0	0	10
Liiga totals			680	38	47	85	766	91	5	4	9	84
NHL totals			2	0	0	0	0	—	—	—	—	—

=== International ===
Year	Team	Event	GP	G	A	Pts	PIM
2000	Finland	WJC18	7	1	1	2	6
2001	Finland	WJC	7	1	0	1	2
2002	Finland	WJC	6	0	1	1	2
Junior totals			20	2	2	4	10
