= Blackout (2008 Finnish film) =

- Theatrical poster
- Directed by: JP Siili
- Written by: JP Siili
- Produced by: Olli Haikka
- Starring: Petteri Summanen; Jenni Banerjee; Irina Björklund
- Cinematography: Jarkko T. Laine
- Production company: Filmiteollisuus Fine
- Distributed by: FS Film Oy
- Release date: 26 December 2008
- Running time: 108 minutes
- Country: Finland
- Language: Finnish

Blackout is a 2008 Finnish film written and directed by JP Siili.

== Main cast ==
- Petteri Summanen as Pekka Valinto
- Jenni Banerjee as Laura Koskimies
- Irina Björklund as Anne Hartela
- Ismo Kallio as Ismo Valinto
- Lena Meriläinen as Hanna Kajaste
- Mikko Kouki as Juha Pasanen
- Mari Perankoski as Mari Koski
- Mikko Leppilampi as Kari Tuikkanen
- Eppu Salminen as Arto Suominen
- Risto Kaskilahti as Risto Vierikko
- Eero Milonoff
- Eeva Putro as Annen avustaja
