= Lauri Nurkse =

Finnish actor and film director

- Born: 11 May 1978 (age 48); Helsinki, Finland
- Occupations: Actor; Film director
- Years active: 2001-present

Lauri Nurkse (born 11 May 1978) is a Finnish actor and film director. He contributed to more than twenty films since 2001.

== Selected filmography ==
Year	Title	Credited as		Notes
Year	Title	Director	Actor	Notes
2001	Cyclomania		Yes	
2003	Bad Boys		Yes	
2003-2005	Kumman kaa	Yes		
2007	The Border		Yes	
2009	The Interrogation		Yes	
2010	The Hustlers	Yes		
2017	Presidentti	Yes		TV series
2021–2022	Lakeside Murders	Yes		TV series
