= Seppo Jokinen =

Finnish writer of crime fiction (born 1949)

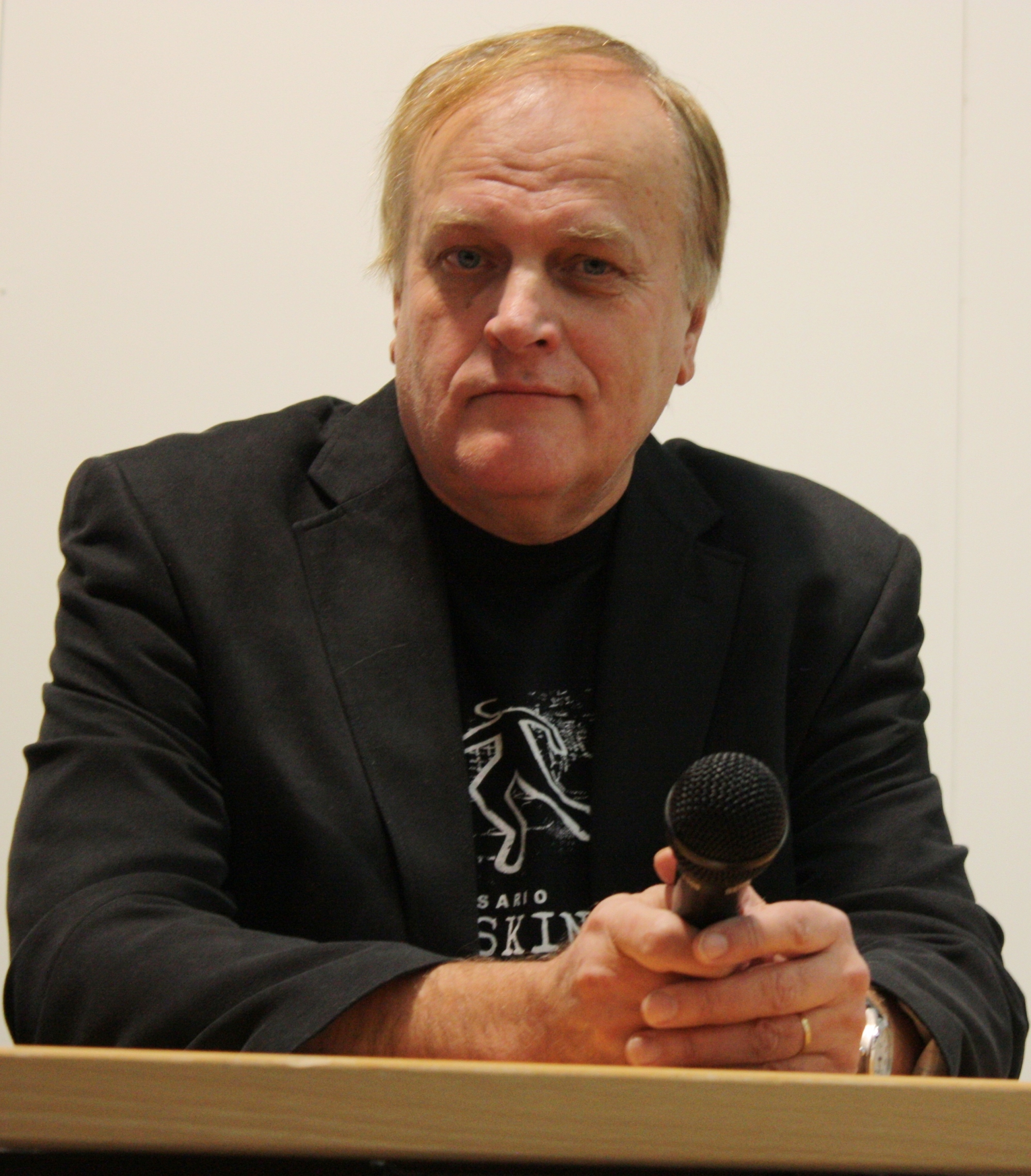
Jokinen in 2009

Seppo Sakari Jokinen (born 13 April 1949) is a Finnish writer of crime fiction.

His books' main character is the fictional police officer Sakari Koskinen from Hervanta, Tampere. Koskinen is divorced and has a son named Antti. The books are published by CrimeTime.

Jokinen himself was born in Tampere. He spent nearly four years in Australia after serving in the army in the early 1970s. He was for many years the main operator in the Tampere city IT centre.

The novel Hukan enkelit was published in English in 2012 as Wolves and Angels by Ice Cold Crime.

== Awards ==
- Tampereen kaupungin kirjallisuuspalkinto 1997 ja 2000
- Olga ja Vilho Linnamon Säätiön tunnustuspalkinto 1998
- Kariston Säätiön tunnustuspalkinto 2000
- Vuoden johtolanka -palkinto 2002
- Suuren Suomalaisen Kirjakerhon tunnustuspalkinto 2003

== Memberships ==
- Pirkkalaiskirjailijat ry 1996
- Suomen Kirjailijaliitto ry 1999
- Suomen Näytelmäkirjailijaliitto ry 2003

== Books ==
=== Sakari Koskinen series ===
- Koskinen ja siimamies. Karisto, 1996. ISBN 951-23-3573-5
- Koskinen ja raadonsyöjä. Karisto, 1997. ISBN 951-23-3704-5
- Koskinen ja pudotuspeli. Karisto, 1998. ISBN 951-23-3838-6
- Koskinen ja taikashow. Karisto, 1999. ISBN 951-23-3974-9
- Koskinen ja kreikkalainen kolmio. Karisto, 2000. ISBN 951-23-4089-5
- Hukan enkelit. Karisto, 2001. ISBN 951-23-4229-4. (Wolves and Angels, Ice Cold Crime, 2012)
- Piripolkka. Karisto, 2002. ISBN 951-23-4320-7
- Vilpittömässä mielessä. Karisto, 2003. ISBN 951-23-4424-6
- Suurta pahaa. Karisto, 2004. ISBN 951-23-4530-7
- Sana sanaa vastaan. Karisto, 2005. ISBN 951-23-4669-9
- Hiirileikki. Karisto, 2006. ISBN 951-23-4774-1
- Viha on paha vieras. Karisto, 2007. ISBN 978-951-23-4885-5
- Kuka sellaista tekisi. Karisto, 2008. ISBN 978-951-23-5000-1
- Lyöty mies. Karisto, 2009. ISBN 978-951-23-5130-5
- Räätälöity ratkaisu. Karisto, 2010. ISBN 978-951-23-5305-7
- Ajomies. Crime Time, 2011. ISBN 978-952-5918-25-0
- Hervantalainen. Crime Time, 2012 ISBN 978-952-591-871-7
- Vihan sukua. Helsinki: Crime Time, 2013. ISBN 978-952-289-047-4
- Mustat sydämet. Helsinki: Crime Time, 2014. ISBN 978-952-289-136-5
- Kuolevaksi julistettu. Helsinki: Crime Time, 2015. ISBN 978-952-289-239-3
- Rahtari. Helsinki: Crime Time, 2016. ISBN 978-952-289-277-5
- Vakaasti harkiten. Helsinki: Crime Time, 2017. ISBN 978-952-289-323-9
- Lyödyn laki. Helsinki: Crime Time, 2018. ISBN 978-952-289-422-9
