= Producing Adults =

2004 film

- DVD cover
- Original title: Lapsia ja aikuisia – kuinka niitä tehdään?
- Directed by: Aleksi Salmenperä
- Screenplay by: Pekko Pesonen
- Produced by: Petri Jokiranta; Tero Kaukomaa
- Starring: Minna Haapkylä; Kari-Pekka Toivonen; Minttu Mustakallio; Tommi Eronen; Pekka Strang; Dick Idman
- Cinematography: Tuomo Hutri
- Edited by: Kimmo Taavila
- Music by: Timo Hietala
- Production company: Blind Spot Pictures
- Distributed by: FS Film Oy
- Release dates: 13 May 2004 (Cannes); 17 September 2004 (Finland)
- Running time: 102 minutes
- Countries: Finland; Sweden
- Language: Finnish
- Budget: €1,200,000

Producing Adults (Finnish: Lapsia ja aikuisia – kuinka niitä tehdään?) (Children and Adults – How To Make Them?) is a 2004 Finnish comedy drama written by Pekko Pesonen and directed by Aleksi Salmenperä. It was Finland's official Academy Award submission for Best Foreign Language Film of 2004.

== Plot ==
The film deals with the myriad complications arising from Venla's (Minna Haapkylä) desire to have a child. Her longtime boyfriend Antero (Kari-Pekka Toivonen) is reluctant, fearing that fatherhood will imperil his last chance to succeed in his speed skating career and by seeing his friend go through fatherhood. Antero does some extreme things to avoid getting Venla pregnant and she begins to be equally devious in her attempts to conceive. Venla seeks help from her bisexual co-worker at a fertility clinic and the relationship between the two begins to blossom amongst many setbacks.

== Cast ==
- Minna Haapkylä as Venla
- Kari-Pekka Toivonen as Antero
- Minttu Mustakallio as Satu
- Tommi Eronen as Rönkkö
- Pekka Strang as Miro
- Dick Idman as Claes

== Production ==
Producing Adults was shot on one camera in 40 days, on a budget of €1,200,000.

== Release ==
The film was released in Sweden as Hela vägen (All the Way) on 26 November 2004.

=== Home media ===
Producing Adults was released on DVD in North America by Wolfe Video on 19 July 2005. In Region 2, the DVD was released by Peccadillo Pictures on 12 April 2010.

== Reception ==
=== Critical response ===
Variety described Producing Adults as "small but charming" and with a lesbian theme that "comes gradually and naturally into the story which never succumbs to the men-are-bad, women-are-fine cliche." AfterEllen said that "While we all adore a good coming out story ... sometimes it's nice to see a more realistic look at romance in all of its heartbreaking complexity." The Hollywood Reporter praised it as "an insightful, well-acted film."

=== Accolades ===
Minttu Mustakallio won "Best Supporting Actress" at the 2005 Jussi Awards (Finland's main film industry awards). Aleksi Salmenperä won the FIPRESCI Prize at the Stockholm Film Awards.
