= Minttu Mustakallio =

Finnish actress (born 1973)

- Born: 23 July 1973 (age 52); Ylivieska, Finland
- Occupation: Actress
- Awards: Jussi for Best Supporting Actress; 2005 Producing Adults

Minttu Mustakallio (born 23 July 1973) is a Finnish actress. Born in Ylivieska, Finland to a Greek father and Finnish mother, she has acted in many Finnish TV dramas and several feature films. She won a Jussi Award in 2005 as Best Supporting Actress in Producing Adults and in 2012 she won a Golden Venla award. She also worked as a writer for the television comedy series Ugrilampaat in 1999.

== Partial filmography ==
- Producing Adults (Lapsia ja aikuisia, 2004)
- Soap (Saippuaprinssi, 2006)
- Ganes (2007)
- Playing Solo (Sooloilua, 2007)
- If You Love (Jos rakastat, 2010)
- The Storage (2011)
