= Juha Wuolijoki =

Finnish director (born 1969)

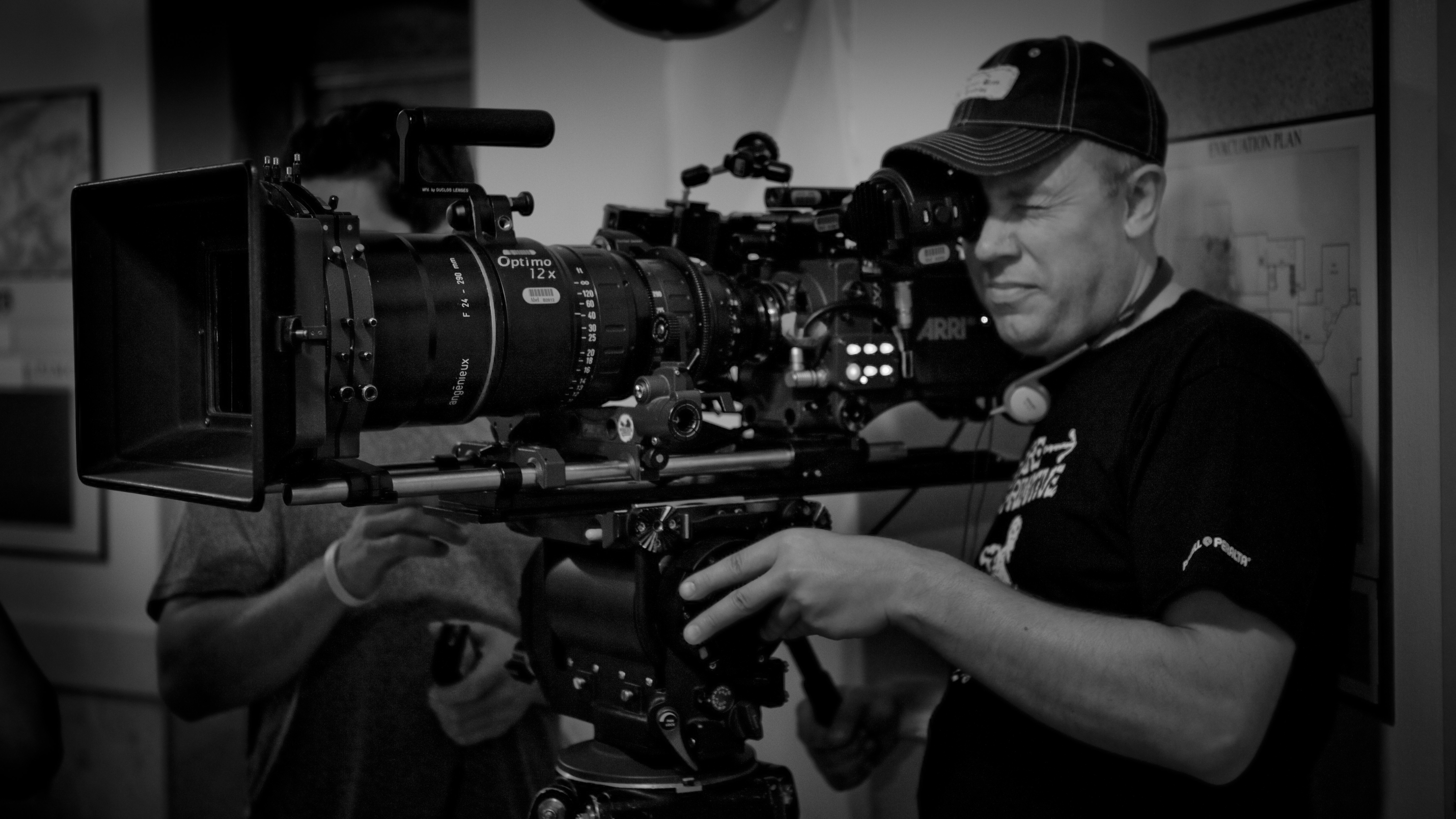
Juha Wuolijoki (2012)

Juha Wuolijoki is a Finnish director, writer and producer and the CEO-founder of the production and distribution company Snapper Films. Founded in 1998, Snapper Films is based in Helsinki and Los Angeles and it's one of the leading production companies in Finland. Juha has a Master of Arts Degree (1995) from the University of Arts and Design (Aalto University). He's best known as the director, co-writer and producer of award-winning features Gourmet Club (2004), Christmas Story (2007), Hella W (2011), and Vinski and the Invisibility Powder (2021). Most recently, he produced and directed the television series King of Los Angeles (2023) and Valhalla Project (2024).

Juha Wuolijoki is a member of Producers Council in the Producers Guild of America (PGA) and the European Film Academy (EFA).

== Career ==
In 2004, Wuolijoki produced and directed the Finnish-language television film Gourmet Club. The film won the Venla award for best television movie of the year, as well as the Golden Nymph award for best screenplay at the 45th Monte Carlo Television Festival and Best Foreign Film at the Long Island International Film Expo in New York .

Following Gourmet Club, Wuolijoki directed and produced the family feature Christmas Story (2007). The film became Finland's top-grossing film for the year, with over 200 000 viewers in its first month. Christmas Story has been sold to over 120 countries with theatrical releases in several territories, making it one of the most widely distributed Finnish live action films. Internationally, Christmas Story has had a theatrical audience of more than million people. The film won two Jussi Awards in Finland and was selected to several international film festivals, including Film Festival Cine-Jeune de l'Aisne in France, Chicago Children's Film Festival, Sarasota Film Festival, and Zlin - 48th International Film Festival for Children and Youth in Czech Republic. On DVD/Blu-ray, Christmas Story was the first Finnish feature to sell Platinum. Christmas Story was theatrically re-released in 2008, 2009, 2010, and historically in 2025 - 18 years after its premiere.

Netflix and Amazon Prime in US have released feature films that Wuolijoki has directed and produced. One of the latest Snapper Films productions is Zarra's Law (2014), a crime drama set in New York starring Tony Sirico, Brendan Fehr, Erin Cummings and Burt Young. Finnish box office hits, family features Ella and Friends and Ella and Friends 2, produced by Juha Wuolijoki, opened theatrically in Finland during the holiday seasons 2012 and 2013. Other recent projects include executive producing of French comedy feature Let My People Go!. The Finnish drama feature Hella W, directed and produced by Juha Wuolijoki, premiered theatrically in Finland and Scandinavia in January 2011. The film won two Jussi Awards in Finland. In 2009, Snapper Films entered into co-operation with the production company Black Forest Films. The co-operation started with Juha Wuolijoki co-producing the comedy feature Father, Son and a Holy Cow (2011). The Bollywood film Shamitabh (2015), starring Amitabh Bachchan and Dhanush, was shot partly in Finland. Snapper Films is the Finnish production company for the film.

Juha has also directed, adapted and translated numerous radio plays.

== Filmography ==
=== Film ===
- Shamitabh (2015) - producer, Finland
- Zarra's Law (2014) - director, producer
- Ella and Friends 2 (2013) - producer
- Ella and Friends (2012) - producer
- Let My People Go! (2011) - producer: Finland
- Father, Son and The Holy Cow (2011) - co-producer
- Hella W (2011) - director, producer, co-writer
- Christmas Story (2007) - director, producer, writer

=== TV ===
- Kaikki kunnossa (TV Series, 4 episodes, 2007) - director
- Gourmet Club (2004) - director, producer, writer
