= Minna Haapkylä =

Finnish actress

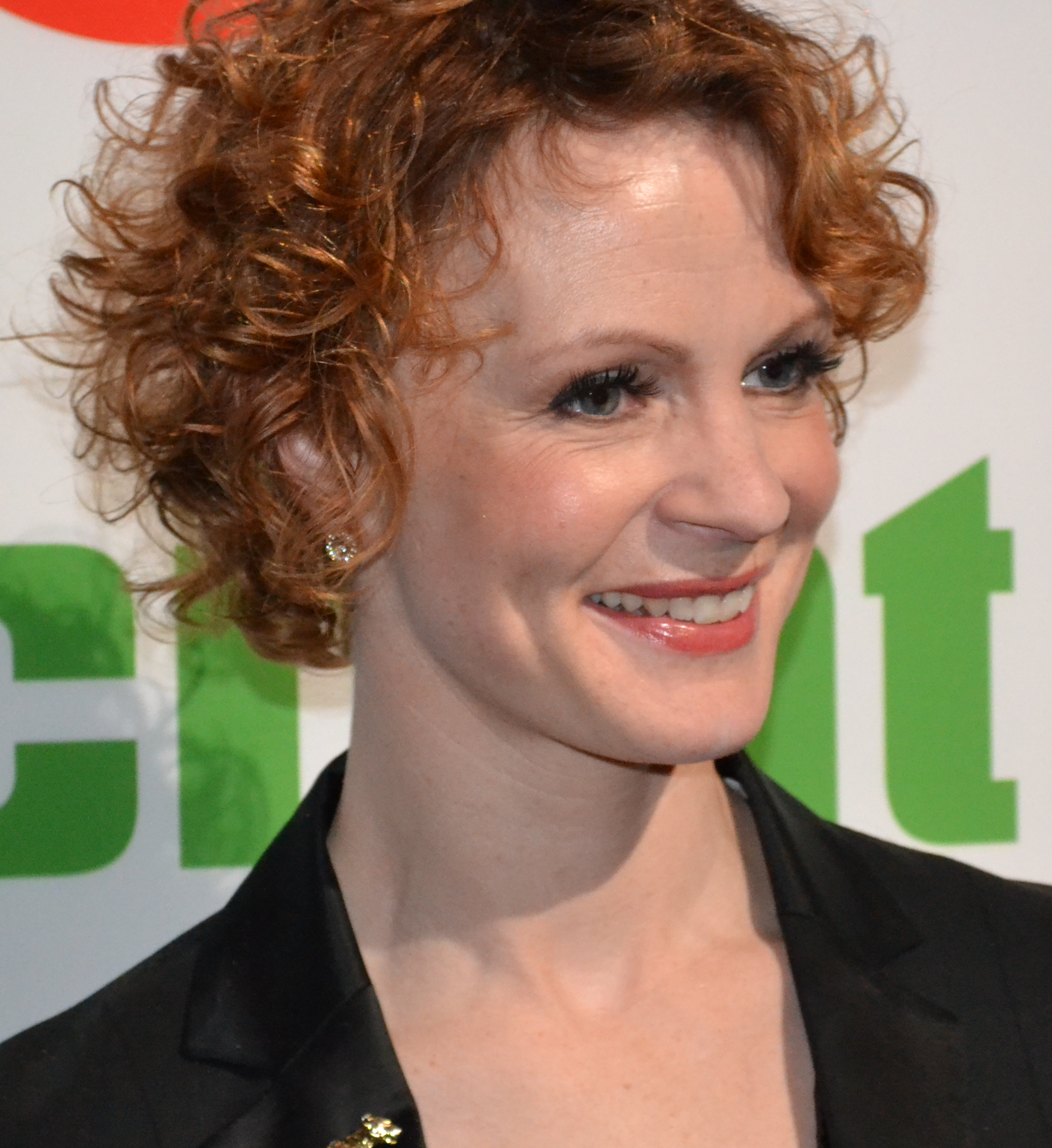
- Haapkylä in 2013
- Born: 10 June 1973 (age 53); Helsinki, Finland
- Occupations: Actor; producer
- Years active: 1995 – present
- Spouses: Hannu-Pekka Björkman (m. 2002–2014) Joanna Haartti (m. 2023)
- Children: 2
- Awards: Jussi Award (1999, 2009)

Minna-Maria Erika Haapkylä (born 10 June 1973) is a Finnish actress and producer. She is known for roles in the 2002 romantic drama film Lovers & Leavers (Kuutamolla), The Border (Raja 1918; 2007), and the 2009 film The Interrogation (Kuulustelu). She also plays Anna in the hit comedy drama series Queen of Fucking Everything.

== Early life and education ==
Minna-Maria Erika Haapkylä was born on 10 June 1973 in Helsinki, Finland. She attended school in France until the age of five.

She earned a Master of Arts in theatre at the Helsinki Theatre Academy, then studied at the Conservatoire national supérieur d'art dramatique in Paris from 1994 to 1996. She followed the master's programme in film production at the Aalto University.

== Career ==
Haapkylä and co-star Marc Gassot in Hovimäki in 2000

Known as Minna Haapkylä, she has appeared in many films and TV series. She became known for her role as Ester Lindhof in the TV series Hovimäki (1999-2003) and for playing the title role in the series Rikospoliisi Maria Kallio (Detective Maria Kallio; 2003).

In 1999 Haapkylä appeared in a supporting role in the Veikko Aaltonen film Rakkaudella, Maire. She also had roles in Lovers & Leavers (2002) and The Border (2007). She has also worked as a producer for the 2022 series Mobile 101. She played the lead role in the 2009 film The Interrogation, directed by Jörn Donner.

She plays Anna in the 2025 comedy drama TV series Queen of Fucking Everything, created and directed by Tiina Lymi, which she also co-produced.

== Recognition and awards ==
Haapkylä won a Jussi Award for best actress in a supporting role for Rakkaudella, Maire in 1999, and another in 2009 for the best actress in a leading roleThe Interrogation.

In 2002, she won the Silver Dolphin Award for Best Actress at the Festroia International Film Festival for her role in the film Kuutamolla (Lovers & Leavers).

== Personal life ==
Haapkylä was married to actor Hannu-Pekka Björkman from 2002 to 2014. They have two sons.

Since 2014, she has been in a relationship with actress Joanna Haartti. They married in August 2023.

She has also played bass guitar in a band.

== Selected filmography ==
- Suolaista ja makeaa (1995)
- Rakkaudella, Maire (1999)
- Lovers & Leavers (Kuutamolla; 2002)
- Helmiä ja sikoja (2003)
- Producing Adults (Lapsia ja aikuisia; 2004)
- FC Venus (2005)
- Charlie Says (2006)
- The Serpent (2006)
- Joulutarina (2007)
- The Border (Raja 1918; 2007)
- Erottamattomat (2008)
- The Interrogation (Kuulustelu; 2009)
- Sovinto (2010)
- Armi elää! (2015)
- Memory of Water (2022)
- Queen of Fucking Everything (TV series; 2025–)
