= JP Siili =

Finnish film director and screenwriter

Jukka-Pekka Siili (born 17 September 1964), often billed as JP Siili, is a Finnish film director and screenwriter. While also frequently working for television, he is best known for having directed films Hymypoika, Ganes and Härmä.

== Selected filmography ==
Films

- Hymypoika (2003)
- Young Gods (2003)
- Ganes (2007)
- Blackout (2008)
- Härmä (2012)
- Selänne (2013)
- Veljeni vartija (2018)

Television

- Sydänten akatemia (1998)
- Juulian totuudet (2002)
- Rakastuin mä luuseriin (2005)
- Tellus (2014)
