= Arto Halonen =

Finnish film director and screenwriter

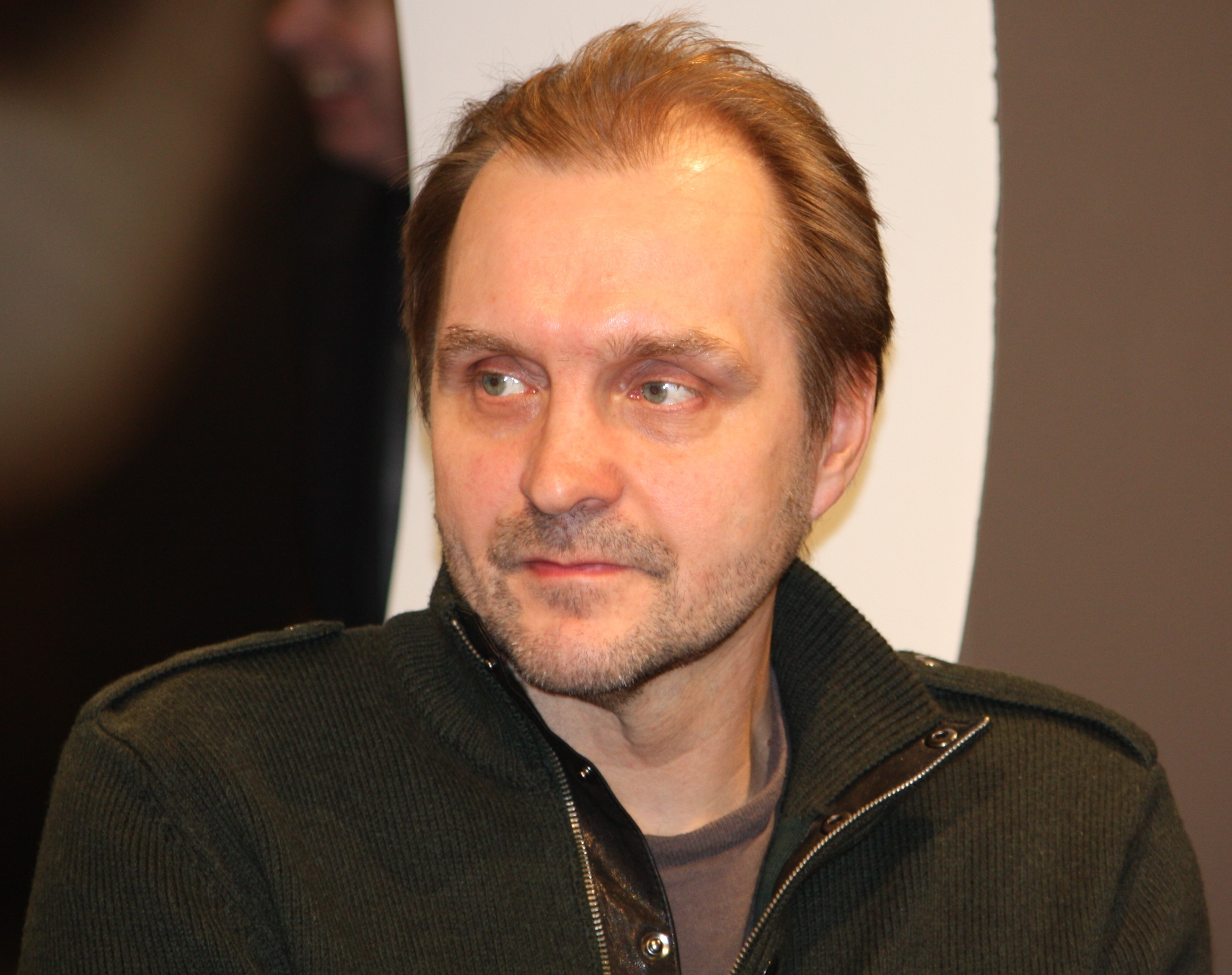
- Halonen in 2010
- Born: Arto Tapio Halonen; 11 January 1964 (age 62); Joensuu, Finland
- Citizenship: Finnish
- Occupations: Film director; producer; screenwriter
- Years active: 1980–present
- Notable work: Karmapa (1998); A Dreamer and the Dreamtribe (1998); Shadow of the Holy Book (2007); The Magnetic Man (2009); Princess (2010); When Heroes Lie (2012); A Patriotic Man (2013); White Rage (2015); Murderous Trance (2018); Home and Away (2023); After Us, the Flood (2024)
- Website: artfilmsproduction.com

Arto Tapio Halonen (born 11 January 1964) is a Finnish film director, screenwriter and producer who has directed documentary and fiction films, animations, and theatre. His best-known documentary films include Karmapa – Two Ways of Divinity (1998), Shadow of the Holy Book (2007), When Heroes Lie (2012) and White Rage (2015).

Halonen's best-known fiction films include Princess (2010), The Guardian Angel (2018) and After Us, the Flood (2024). Princess was a commercial success and attracted over 300,000 cinema viewers in Finland. The distribution rights to The Guardian Angel have been sold to 70 countries. After Us, the Flood has toured international festivals, winning several awards. Halonen's films deal with social themes, religions, manipulation and the world of sports.

Halonen is the founder of the DocPoint festival. He served as its festival director from 2001 to 2003 and as artistic director from 2001 to 2004. In 2002, he founded DOKKINO, a film event for children and young people, in connection with DocPoint. DOKKINO received the State Prize for Children's Culture in 2016, and DocPoint received the State Prize for Cinematic Art in 2024.

Halonen was awarded the Finland Prize in 2005 for a significant artistic career. In addition, he has received the City of Helsinki Culture Award (2010), the nationwide mental health award of the Finnish Association for Mental Health (2010), and the national civic action recognition award of the Central Association for Social Welfare and Health Security (2010). Halonen founded the production company Art Films Production AFP Oy in 1997.

== Life and career ==
=== Early life ===
Halonen was born in Joensuu.

=== Early career: the 1980s ===
Halonen's first film was created during an art and environmental education course at the Joensuu Commercial College. Over the next two years, he made twelve 8 mm home movies using equipment borrowed from the Joensuu Film Club. His first two fictional short films were made with fellow student Keijo Kakkonen in the spring of 1983. Between 1983 and 1985, Halonen made one short fiction film with Jukka Hartikainen and three with Risto Rantakoski. In addition, Halonen directed five short fiction films and one short documentary. Some of these short films were awarded at amateur festivals in Finland and abroad.

In 1984, Halonen represented Finland at the UNICA festival in East Germany with his short fiction film Taivaanrannan taa, which dealt with the musician Pekka Streng. Halonen later returned to Streng's story in his documentary The Magnetic Man (2009).

In 1985, Halonen, Risto Rantakoski and Mikko Pietiäinen were filming a documentary about the homeless man Veli Härkönen. Härkönen's death in a fire during filming attracted local and national attention. In connection with the case, Halonen publicly criticized the social authorities of the City of Joensuu, and this has been seen as his first social intervention through film.

In 1986, Halonen began his professional projects with the three-part fictional film series Sodan kasvot. The first part of the series, Ensi jouluna, was completed in 1986, but the series remained unfinished. In 1987, Halonen founded a sole proprietorship, and the drawn animation The Two Faces was also completed with Timo Kokkonen. The film was shown on MTV3. In the same year, Halonen made the clay animation Arina (1987) in collaboration with sculptor Teppo Laurinolli.

In 1988, Halonen's first feature-length documentary, Aaro Iivari Aukusti, Farmer's Son, was completed. The 50-minute film tells of the actions of Joensuu city manager Aaro Heikkilä under the pressure of dismissal threats and criminal charges.

From 1986 to 1989, Halonen taught film at the Joensuu School of Visual Arts for Children and Young People, where his students included actor Timo Lavikainen. In 1989, Halonen was appointed regional artist for film and video art in North Karelia.

=== The 1990s ===
Halonen served as regional artist in North Karelia from 1989 to 1993, during which time he led an extensive film education experiment. In the project, teachers were trained under the guidance of media professionals, and those teachers then applied the training in their own classrooms. Material from the experiment was collected for the Finnish National Board of Education for the development of media education in schools. Halonen also organized a screenwriting competition, whose eight winners were able to participate in professional training. Two short films were also produced on the basis of the competition. During his regional artist period, Halonen also co-directed with film director Markku Pölönen the educational film Valoa – Erään videoelokuvan anatomia.

In 1990, Halonen and Teppo Laurinolli's second clay animation Tourist was completed and selected for the domestic competition of the Tampere Short Film Festival. Halonen made the observational documentary The Long Trip (1989) about the making of Tourist. Finland's national public broadcaster Yle showed both films.

In 1990, Halonen created the shadow animation series Lammenneidin tarina for Yle's children's and youth department in collaboration with the children's theatre group Vunukka. He next directed the sports documentary The Light Behind the Shade (1990) about hurdler Arto Bryggare's comeback attempt, and the dramatized documentary Ringside (1992) about boxer Tarmo Uusivirta. Jarmo Jääskeläinen, founder of Yle TV2's Dokumenttiprojekti, bought Ringside for the programme. This began a collaboration of more than 20 years between Halonen, Jääskeläinen and his successor Ilkka Vehkalahti. Ringside won the EBU's Golden Shot award for best sports film, the State Film Art Commission quality support award, and the North Karelia Arts Commission's Ensiesitys award.

In 1993, the feature comedy film The Happy Wedding Day, produced by Yle TV2 Drama and written and directed by Halonen, was completed. With 830,000 viewers it was Yle's third most watched film of the year. The following year saw the release of the short documentary Something in the Blood, which dealt with Russian journalist Vyacheslav Oparin's connection to yetis. Veren perintö was selected for the domestic competition series of the Tampere Film Festival.

In 1995, the 65-minute TV drama Home, written by Melina Voipio, was completed; Halonen directed and adapted it for TV2 Drama. A shortened version of the film was also selected for the domestic competition at the Tampere Film Festival.

Among Halonen's best-known work is Karmapa – Two Ways of Divinity (1998), which deals with the selection conflict between the Karmapa lamas and China's aggressive Tibet policy. The film received the EU's humanitarian ECHO award and caused a political dispute when China attempted to prevent its screening at the Hong Kong Film Festival. In 2008, the case led to Halonen, who had been on the Finnish Olympic Committee's invitation list, being denied a visa to the Beijing Olympics, which sparked widespread attention and criticism over the silence of Finland's state leadership. A film about the difficult and ethically challenging making of the documentary, Karmapa – A Voyage on the Roof of the World (1998), received honorable mention from the jury at the Kettupäivät festival.

Also completed in 1998 was the documentary A Dreamer and the Dreamtribe, which deals with the dream culture of the Malaysian Temiar Senoi tribe and its influence on Western dream research. The film premiered in June 1998 as part of the 15th annual conference of the International Association for the Study of Dreams in Oahu, Hawaii.

=== The 2000s ===
In 2000, Halonen directed and wrote the documentary The Stars' Caravan produced in Kyrgyzstan by Millennium Film. The Stars' Carava is based on an original idea by Richard Manini and Carlo Cresto-Dina, and deals with the use of film as propaganda and its role as a messenger between cultures. The work premiered in the main competition of the International Documentary Film Festival Amsterdam (IDFA) in Amsterdam, and in Finland it received the State Film Art Commission quality support award. The film's music was composed by Edward Vesala and Iro Haarla. Vesala died before the film was completed, and it remained his last composition work. The Stars' Caravan is dedicated to Vesala's memory. Film critic Dennis Grunes selected the film among the 100 best Eastern European filmmakers or films made in Eastern Europe.

Halonen served on the board of Dokumenttikilta from 2000 to 2003 and as its chair from 2001 to 2002. He was a key figure in the internationalization of Finnish documentary film. Through Dokumenttikilta, Halonen produced the Naapureiden silmin and Uptown-Downtown festivals in Helsinki in 2000 and 2001, as well as the Northern Exposure Finnish film event in New York in 2002. Halonen also served as artistic director of the events.

In 2001, Halonen founded the Helsinki documentary film festival DocPoint, and in 2002 DOKKINO for children and young people in connection with it. The first DocPoint in 2002 was a success. By its third year, DocPoint had grown into the largest documentary film festival in the Nordic countries and had risen into the world's top ten in terms of audience size. Halonen said the aim had been, in addition to strengthening domestic film culture, to offer "moments of pause" and deep understanding amid a flood of lightweight media.

Halonen continued on DocPoint's board until 2013. According to film historian Peter von Bagh, "one of the milestones in the rise of Finnish documentary film is DocPoint, Arto Halonen's obsession, from which a festival has grown that has significantly increased the visibility and 'media-compatibility' of documentary film."

In 2011, Halonen curated the NYC – Finnish Documentary Film Event in New York together with DocPoint artistic director Erja Dammert. The event screened 47 Finnish documentaries, including at the Museum of Modern Art (MoMA).

From 2004 to 2007, Halonen made one feature-length and three short documentaries set in Cuba. The short film The Tank Man (2004) won awards at several festivals. The feature documentary Conquistadors of Cuba (2005) premiered in the international competition of the Visions du Réel festival and had theatrical distribution in Finland. The short documentaries The Legend (2005) and Confrontations in Cuba (2007) completed a thematic whole dealing with the intersections of history, myths and everyday life in totalitarian Cuba.

In 2005, Halonen's feature documentary Pavlov's Dogs was completed and premiered in the main competition of IDFA. The film deals with mechanisms of manipulation and power in Russia through the psychologist Sergei Knyazev. Pavlov's Dogs was screened, among other places, at MoMA in the Documentary Fortnight programme, and as the opening film of the Flahertiana documentary festival in Russia. The Meetings in Siberia festival selected Pavlov's Dogs among the best films in the festival's history. The film received an honourable mention at Kettupäivät in 2006 and a Jussi nomination in 2007.

In 2007, Shadow of the Holy Book, directed by Halonen and co-written with Kevin Frazier, was completed. The documentary deals with Turkmenistan's totalitarian regime and the propaganda cult surrounding the Ruhnama, as well as the role of Western multinational corporations in supporting the dictatorship. The film highlights how companies support dictatorships as part of business agreements, for example by translating the dictator's propaganda work into different languages.

Shadow of the Holy Book had its world premiere in the main competition of IDFA and toured more than 100 international festivals. The film was nominated for the European Film Academy's award for Best Documentary, and received, among other honours, the Grand Prix at the International Human Rights Film Festival in Paris. The film received wide international distribution, and its television rights were sold to several countries. In the United States, it was shown on PBS's prestigious Independent Lens series and on the Sundance Channel.

The film's main financier, Independent Television Service (ITVS), also carried out an impact campaign in U.S. cities in connection with the film's release together with local PBS stations and NGOs.

Shadow of the Holy Book sparked wide social and political discussion. Halonen and Frazier highlighted the activities of international corporations in Turkmenistan and demanded corporate responsibility in human rights issues. They sent an open letter to Turkmenistan's president Gurbanguly Berdymuhammedo and also took part in the discussion in Finland. Halonen challenged Finnish Foreign Minister Alexander Stubb to raise human rights issues during his visit to Turkmenistan in his capacity as OSCE Chairperson-in-Office. According to Stubb, the film and the discussions surrounding it helped him understand the country's political situation.

As a result of the discussion generated by the film, Finland's Ministry for Foreign Affairs commissioned a study on the ethical conduct of Finnish companies abroad, and the topic became part of the Finnish Government's human rights report.

A book of the same name by Frazier and Halonen based on the film was nominated for Poland's most prestigious non-fiction award, the Ryszard Kapuściński Award. Among other points, the book highlighted the role of Nokia Siemens Networks and Siemens in developing Turkmenistan's surveillance systems, which were used to control the opposition. Halonen's and Frazier's revelations about Nokia's actions later led to new, widely noticed revelations about the Nokia Siemens controversial telecommunications surveillance deals with the Iranian government, where the system was used to spy on dissidents.

In connection with the film, Halonen also founded the website Freedom for Sale, which deals with the relationships between business activity, human rights and authoritarian systems.

In 2008, Halonen directed the documentary Hyvitys for Yle's Tosi tarina series; it was a sister work to Halonen's earlier film Ringside.

The Magnetic Man (2009), about singer-songwriter Pekka Streng, who died young, had theatrical distribution in Finland and was nominated for the Jussi Award for Best Documentary. Halonen also organized a memorial concert for Pekka Streng at Tavastia Club, from which a separate concert film Strengin puutarhassa (2009) was compiled.

In the 2000s, Halonen also served as producer for the documentaries Pontikkapitäjä (2005), Tupakkatytöt (2006) and Yhden tähden hotelli (2007).

Pontikkapitäjä, directed by Jarmo Jääskeläinen and Auli Koponen, is a documentary about how Kitee became Finland's best-known center for the production and sale of moonshine.

Tupakkatytöt, directed and written by Tarja Mattila, follows the lives and survival of three women after the closure of Amer's tobacco factory. The film won awards at international film festivals in Germany, both in Leipzig and Lübeck. In addition, Tupakkatytöt received the jury's special prize at the Tampere Film Festival.

Yhden tähden hotelli, directed and written by Ari Matikainen, follows the life of singer Jorma Kääriäinen. The film had theatrical distribution in Finland and won the Jussi Award for Best Documentary.

=== The 2010s ===
Halonen's first fiction feature released in cinemas, Princess, premiered in the Golden Zenith competition of the Montreal World Film Festival in 2010. Halonen co-wrote the film with Pirjo Toikka and Paavo Westerberg.

In Finland, Princess became the most watched domestic film in cinemas during its first week of release and held the number one spot for five weeks. The film became one of the most watched Finnish domestic films of the 2010s, drawing more than 300,000 viewers.

Princess won several international awards, including Best Film at the Cape Winelands Film Festival in South Africa and an honourable mention at Portugal's Festroia festival. Katja Küttner, who played the lead role, received the Best Actress award at the Tallinn Black Nights Film Festival, a Jussi Award, and recognition as the Finnish Actors Union's Film Actor of the Year.

A large school campaign was carried out in connection with the film in cooperation with RAY, the Finnish Central Association for Mental Health, and Koulukino. The campaign aimed to increase understanding of difference and to reduce prejudice and negative attitudes.

A making-of documentary, Prinsessan hovissa (2010), was also released in connection with the launch of Princess. It describes the life and personality of Anna Lappalainen through people who knew her. In addition, the documentary follows the filming of Princess and features its creators and actors. The making-of documentary was directed by Italo Moncada, Venla Hellstedt, Halonen and Vilhelmiina Vilhunen.

Halonen and Toikka wrote, and Halonen directed, the musical Princess for the Tampere Workers' Theatre in 2013. The musical was the most watched production at the Tampere Workers' Theatre in autumn 2013 and spring 2014.

In 2011, Halonen produced Jarmo Jääskeläinen's documentary Voittajat ja voitetut. In the film, Jääskeläinen returns to Poland 25 years after the strikes and protests that began at the Gdańsk shipyard. The documentary follows three strikers who played a central role in the events and examines the history and present state of the Solidarity movement. It remained Jääskeläinen's last film.

Halonen's documentary When Heroes Lie directed by him and written together with Jouni K. Kemppainen and Kevin Frazier, was completed in 2012. The original idea for the film was proposed by Iikka Vehkalahti, head of Yle's Documentary Project. The documentary deals with the doping culture of cross-country skiing and the events of the 2001 Lahti World Championships, and moves between Finland, Italy, Sweden and Norway. The film depicts a system in which individuals are drawn into doping as part of a broader sports culture and its problems.

When Heroes Lie had its Finnish premiere at the Love & Anarchy festival, where it was screened as the opening film of the domestic gala. Its international premiere was at the International Documentary Film Festival Amsterdam, and it also served as the opening film of the Tallinn DocPoint festival. The film received the State Film Art Commission quality support award, and was nominated for the Lumilapio award for investigative journalism. The documentary attracted exceptionally wide media attention not only in Finland but also in Norway.

The feature fiction film A Patriotic Man (2013) continued the same theme through the use of doping in 1980s skiing. Halonen wrote the film together with Jouni K. Kemppainen. In the film, Toivo, who has become unemployed, becomes the Finnish national ski team's secret "blood tank." A Patriotic Man was the first Finnish-Croatian co-production in history. In addition to Finland and Croatia, it was also shot in Slovenia. The film was screened, among other places, at the Seattle International Film Festival. A Patriotic Man received Jussi nominations for Best Leading Actor (Martti Suosalo) and for make-up design (Riikka Virtanen).

In 2015, Halonen's dramatized documentary White Rage was completed. Halonen found Lauri's story in an article written by Katri Merikallio in Suomen Kuvalehti. The film tells the story of Lauri, who was severely bullied at school and fantasized about mass murder. Lauri was able to seek help and later became a researcher of aggression and violent behavior as well as a respected expert.

White Rage toured widely at international festivals and received, among other honours, a jury honourable award at the Millennium Docs Against Gravity festival in Warsaw. In Finland, the film received the State Film Art Commission quality support award. A broad anti-bullying school campaign was carried out around the film in cooperation with Koulukino and the Finnish Association for Mental Health. The campaign inspired Member of Parliament Tiina Elovaara (Finns Party) to submit a legislative initiative concerning the transfer of bullied pupils to another school.

The film has been used as a social and pedagogical tool in several Arab countries. Through the organizations ANHAR and Action Association 216, the film has been used as material in schools, prisons and youth homes. White Rage has also been shown in special screenings for students in North Macedonia as part of efforts to prevent school bullying and discrimination. As a result, the Manaki Brothers Film Festival together with Inner Wheel Club Skopje Europea awarded Halonen an honorary diploma in 2019 for significant work promoting tolerance.

In 2016, Halonen served as co-producer on The Liberation of Skopje, directed by Rade and Danilo Šerbedžija and set in Skopje during the Second World War. The film was a Macedonian-Croatian-Finnish co-production, and was selected as Macedonia's official Oscar entry in the category of Best International Feature Film.

In 2018, Halonen's psychological thriller The Guardian Angel, which he directed and wrote, was completed. The film was an international co-production and was shot in Croatia and Denmark. The Guardian Angel is based on real events and on the hypnosis murders that took place in Denmark in the 1950s. The film's distribution rights have been sold to 70 countries, and it was released under different titles in different markets: in the United States as Murderous Trance, in France as Hypnose, and in Italy as L'ipnotista.

The Guardian Angel had its international premiere at the Warsaw Film Festival and its North American premiere at the Santa Barbara Film Festival. The film received awards for Best Film and Best Actor (Josh Lucas) at the Gold Movie Awards in London. Halonen began planning the project as early as 1997 and managed to meet Palle Hardrup, who had committed the real hypnosis murders, before Hardrup's death in 2012. The film sparked discussion among doctors about "against-one's-will" hypnosis and how such mechanisms are actively exploited in the present day.

Kevin Frazier and Halonen also wrote The Guardian Angel novel, published by WSOY. The book was published not only in Finland but also in Denmark, Portugal and Italy.

In the same year, Halonen's dramatized documentary Takaisin valoon was completed. The film tells the story of Marissa Jaakola, who became a victim of human trafficking and exploitation. The film had its international premiere at the Manaki Brothers Film Festival in North Macedonia, and it was also screened in the Social Justice competition section of the Santa Barbara Film Festival. A book of the same name was also published in connection with the film.

A broad social campaign was built around Takaisin valoon, involving, among others, Victim Support Finland and the Finnish Association for Mental Health. In connection with the release of the film, Halonen negotiated with Jaakola's creditors so that she would be freed from debts arising from crimes committed against her. The negotiations were successful, and Jaakola had most of her debts forgiven. In addition, a fundraising campaign was organized through Art Films, enabling Jaakola to finally escape her debt burden.

=== The 2020s ===
In 2023, Halonen directed the documentary Suomeen juurtuneet, which follows the lives of the basketball players Leon Huff and Ervin Latimer, who moved to Finland, and their sons Shawn Huff and Ervin Latimer Jr. The film deals with identity, culture and sports, as well as experiences of becoming rooted in Finnish society.

In addition to Finland, the film was shot during the European Basketball Championship in the COVID bubble and at Pitti Uomo, Europe's most important menswear event. Suomeen juurtuneet had its international premiere at the Thessaloniki International Documentary Festival.

That same year, Halonen's family musical film Antero Varovainen ja Onnenkivi premiered. The film is based on an original story long developed by Halonen and Jukka Itkonen, for which they received their first script development support from the Finnish Film Foundation as early as 1990. Itkonen also wrote the lyrics for the songs in the film. The film was selected for several children's and youth film festivals and won the Best Film award at the Kinderfilm Steiermark festival in Austria. In Finland, the film drew more than 55,000 cinema viewers.

Itkonen died six months before filming began, and the film is dedicated to his memory. Before his death, Itkonen also managed to write the book Antero Varovainen ja Onnenkivi with Halonen; Tammi published it at the same time as the film.

In 2024, Halonen directed the science fiction drama After Us, the Flood, written by Ossi Hakala, which deals with humanity's inability to solve the climate crisis. The film premiered in the Free Spirit competition of the Warsaw International Film Festival and has won several international awards, including the Silver Méliès Award for Best Film at the Trieste Science+Fiction Festival, as well as the Gort Award for Best Film at the Boston SciFi Film Festival, the oldest U.S. festival focused on genre cinema. It was also nominated for the Golden Méliès Award for Best European Fantastic Film, awarded by the Méliès International Festivals Federation.

In Finland, After Us, the Flood received two Jussi nominations: Elias Westerberg for Breakthrough Role of the Year and Vesa Jokinen for Visual Effects. Hakala was also nominated among the three finalists for the Sylvi Award of the Finnish Dramatists and Screenwriters Association, awarded for the year's best film screenplay.

== Social impact ==
Halonen's film production has often been connected to social themes and campaigns built around them. His documentaries, such as Shadow of the Holy Book, Pavlov's Dogs, Karmapa – Two Ways of Divinity, Takaisin valoon and Suomeen juurtuneet, deal with topics such as human rights, authoritarian systems, corporate responsibility, racism, multiculturalism, manipulation and human trafficking. The documentary White Rage, in turn, examines school bullying and the factors underlying violence. Some of Halonen's documentaries have been used for educational purposes in Finland and abroad, including in the United States, the Middle East and North Africa.

In Halonen's fiction films, the relationship between the individual and society is a recurring theme. Princess deals with questions related to mental health and social norms, while The Guardian Angel examines psychological manipulation. After Us, the Flood deals with humanity's relationship to the environment and ecological threats. Halonen has addressed the structures of sport and the effects of doping in the documentary When Heroes Lie and the fiction film A Patriotic Man.

Halonen has also influenced the field of documentary film as the founder of the Helsinki documentary film festival DocPoint and the DOKKINO event for children and young people. The pedagogical materials created in connection with Halonen's films have expanded the use of his works for educational purposes.

== Film campaigns ==
Campaigns have been organized in connection with several of Halonen's films with the aim of increasing discussion about the social issues addressed by the films, such as human rights, mental health, school bullying, racism, multiculturalism and environmental questions.

The campaigns have included film screenings, audience discussions, expert panels and learning materials for educational institutions. Events have been organized in Finland and internationally, including in connection with film festivals, schools and special screenings.

Some of the issues raised by the campaigns have led to official investigations and legislative initiatives in Finland.

Campaign partners have included authorities, NGOs and expert organizations such as the Finnish UN Association, MIELI Mental Health Finland, the Finnish Central Association for Mental Health, Koulukino and Victim Support Finland.

== Filmography ==
- Pre-professional 8 mm films 1983–1986
- Next Christmas / Sodan kasvot (1986)
- Progress / Kehitys (1986–1987)
- The Two Faces / Kahdet kasvot (1987)
- Arina (1987)
- Aaro Iivari Aukusti, Farmer's Son / Aaro Iivari Aukusti, maanviljelijän poika (1988)
- Tourist / Turisti (1989)
- The Long Trip / Pitkä matka (1989)
- The Tale of the Pond Maiden / Lammenneidin tarina 1–3 (1990)
- The Light Behind the Shade / Valo varjon takaa (1990)
- Valoa – erään videoelokuvan anatomia (1991, with Markku Pölönen)
- Ringside (1992)
- The Happy Wedding Day / Onnellinen hääpäivä (1992)
- Syyllinen (1993)
- Something in the Blood / Veren perintö (1994)
- Home / Koti (1995)
- Karmapa – Two Ways of Divinity / Karmapa – Jumaluuden kaksi tietä (1998)
- Karmapa – A Voyage on the Roof of the World / Karmapa – Matka maailman katolle (1998)
- A Dreamer and the Dreamtribe / Unelmoija ja unikansa (1998)
- The Stars' Caravan / Taivasta vasten (2000)
- The Tank Man / Tynnyrimies (2004)
- Conquistadors of Cuba / Kuuban valloittajat (2005)
- Pavlov's Dogs / Pavlovin koirat (2005)
- Moonshine Village / Pontikkapitäjä (2005)
- The Legend / Legenda (2005)
- Tobacco Girls / Tupakkatytöt (2006)
- Shadow of the Holy Book / Pyhän kirjan varjo (2007)
- Confrontations in Cuba / Kohtaamisia Kuubassa (2007)
- Lone Star Hotel / Yhden tähden hotelli (2007)
- Amends / Hyvitys (2008)
- The Magnetic Man / Magneettimies (2009)
- In Streng's Garden / Strengin puutarhassa (2009)
- Princess / Prinsessa (2010)
- When Heroes Lie / Sinivalkoinen valhe (2012)
- A Patriotic Man / Isänmaallinen mies (2013)
- White Rage / Valkoinen raivo (2015)
- The Liberation of Skopje / Uhrauksia vapaudelle (2016)
- The Guardian Angel aka Murderous Trance (2018)
- Back Towards the Light / Takaisin valoon (2018)
- Arnold Cautious and the Happiness Stone / Antero Varovainen ja onnenkivi (family film, 2023)
- Home and Away / Suomeen juurtuneet (documentary, 2023)
- After Us, The Flood / Jälkeemme vedenpaisumus (2024)
