= The Magnetic Man =

- Finnish: Magneettimies
- Directed by: Arto Halonen
- Written by: Arto Halonen
- Produced by: Arto Halonen
- Narrated by: Olavi Uusivirta
- Cinematography: Hannu Vitikainen
- Edited by: Joona Louhivuori
- Animation by: Hanna-Leena Kartano
- Production company: Art Films production AFP
- Distributed by: Pirkanmaan elokuvakeskus r.y.; Sandrew Metronome Distribution Finland Oy
- Release date: 16 October 2009 (Finland)
- Running time: 79 minutes
- Country: Finland
- Language: Finnish

The Magnetic Man (Finnish: Magneettimies) is a 2009 documentary film directed by Arto Halonen. The film explores the life, work, and influence of Finnish singer-songwriter Pekka Streng, who died at a young age.

The documentary tells Streng's story through the people close to him as well as through those who were deeply influenced by his work. At the same time, the film follows the process of creating a new album, Unen maa, from previously unreleased reel-to-reel recordings left behind by Streng. The project was led by Jukka Hakoköngäs, with Halonen also participating in its production. The film includes previously unpublished material related to Streng, including photographs and diary entries.

Streng lived for many years in Myrskylä, where The Magnetic Man was also filmed. On 5 September 2009, the municipality of Myrskylä organized a Streng event featuring musical performances and an art exhibition, as well as a preview screening of The Magnetic Man. The film's official premiere later that autumn took place at the Love & Anarchy film festival. It was also screened at several international festivals and events, including the International TV Festival Bar event in Montenegro, Documentarist Istanbul Documentary Days festival, and North by Northeast event. The film received a theatrical release in Finland and was nominated for the Jussi Award for Best Documentary Film.

In connection with the film, Halonen also organized a memorial concert for Streng. The concert was subsequently made into a separate concert film, In Streng's Garden (Strengin puutarhassa, 2009). The memorial concert was held at Tavastia Club in Helsinki in February 2009.

== Reception ==
Five critics in Helsingin Sanomat's Nyt supplement gave the film an average rating of 3.0 stars.

Leena Virtanen of Nyt called The Magnetic Man a significant cultural achievement. She noted that the film subtly strips away some of the mystique that had accumulated around Streng over the decades, revealing him as a talented and surprisingly determined artist. According to Virtanen, the cinematography seeks a delicate and soft aesthetic that suits the subject, since "in the 1970s, men were feminine too."

Tarmo Poussu of Ilta-Sanomat wrote that Arto Halonen, whom he described as Finland's most internationally acclaimed documentary director, had made his most personal and possibly his best film. According to Poussu, "perhaps Finland's most enigmatic songwriter has received a biographical documentary worthy of him."

Tuomo Karhu of Turun Sanomat considered The Magnetic Man almost frustratingly allusive for a biographical film. "Halonen's film works best as a cinematic parallel and counterpart to Streng himself. Its mysterious narrative style is ideally suited to portraying Streng's exceptionally rich inner world."

Kai Hirvasnoro of Kansan Uutiset, meanwhile, found The Magnetic Man stunning: "What makes the film stunning is the way two talents from entirely different eras encounter one another. Arto Halonen's style perfectly captures the spirit of Pekka Streng's songs."

== People appearing in the documentary ==
- Atte Blom
- Arto Halonen
- Pauli Hanhiniemi
- Kärtsy Hatakka
- Juha Hurme
- Tapio Korjus
- Calle Lindholm
- Vesa-Matti Loiri
- Ritva Oksanen
- Emma Salokoski
- Keijo Siekkinen
- Kaarina Valoaalto
- Olavi Uusivirta
- Joonia Streng
- Matti Streng
- Irmeli Isomäki
