= A Dreamer and the Dreamtribe =

- Directed by: Arto Halonen
- Written by: Arto Halonen
- Produced by: Arto Halonen / Art Films production AFP; Jan Wellmann / Mandrake Productions
- Cinematography: Timo Heinänen
- Edited by: Juha Antti-Poika
- Music by: Vesa Mäkinen
- Production companies: Mandrake Productions; Art Films production
- Release date: 1998
- Running time: 52 minutes
- Countries: Finland; United Kingdom

A Dreamer and the Dreamtribe is a 1998 documentary film written and directed by Arto Halonen. The film explores the dream culture of the Malaysian Temiar Senoi tribe, the challenges involved in preserving it, its distinctive characteristics, and its influence on Western dream research.

The film was shot in Malaysia, United States, and Finland. It combines documentary material with dramatized sequences, including scenes depicting the work of anthropologist Pat Noone and psychotherapist Kilton Stewart among the Temiar Senoi during the 1930s.

The film premiered in June 1998 at the 15th annual conference of the International Association for the Study of Dreams (IASD) in O'ahu, Hawaii. Its festival premiere took place later that year at the Helsinki International Film Festival – Love & Anarchy.

The festival catalogue used a statement by Temiar shaman Abilem Lumi as the film's motto: “To maintain the dreams, it's very important to have ceremonies.”

The film was co-produced with Yle TV2's Dokumenttiprojekti and was also broadcast as part of Yle's Kolmas Ulottuvuus. Its international distributor was the American Fox Lorber (Kino Lorber). The documentary was produced by Art Films production and Mandrake Productions, with Peter Coyote narrating.

The film is thematically connected to Halonen's other 1998 documentary, Karmapa - Two Ways of Divinity. Both films examine communities whose identities and distinctive traditions are threatened by modernization, cultural assimilation, or political conflict.

== Dream research ==
Kilton Stewart proposed that the Temiar consciously controlled their dreams and were able to use dreams to overcome fears and influence future events. Later on, Robert Dentan, who conducted research among the Temiar from the 1960s through the 1980s, did not observe the same phenomenon and found some of Stewart and Noone's descriptions exaggerated. The film explores the academic debate surrounding Stewart's theories and the disagreements among Western dream researchers.

Jeremy Taylor and Patricia Garfield, both founding members of the International Association for the Study of Dreams (IASD), played important roles in popularizing what became known in the West as the Senoi dream technique. Dreamwork specialist and Unitarian priest Jeremy Taylor applied a Senoi-influenced dreamwork method in dream and therapy groups that he led. He also discussed the Senoi tradition in his 1992 book Where People Fly and Water Runs Uphill: Using Dreams to Tap the Wisdom of the Unconscious.

Psychologist and dream researcher Patricia Garfield published Creative Dreaming in 1974. The book became an international bestseller and was translated into several languages. In it, Garfield presented Senoi dream practices in a chapter entitled “Learn from Senoi Dreamers.”

The film also presents critical perspectives from psychology and sociology professor G. William Domhoff and sociology professor Geoffrey Benjamin of the National University of Singapore. Domhoff has criticized Kilton Stewart's views as well as the interpretations of the Senoi offered by Jeremy Taylor and Patricia Garfield. Benjamin, who conducted fieldwork among the Temiar, has likewise taken a critical view of the theory of Temiar dream control.

In a 1998 article in Helsingin Sanomat, titled Uneksijoiden opissa (Learning from Dreamers), Halonen stated that Temiar shamans had confirmed to him the key observations made by Kilton Stewart and anthropologist Pat Noone, including the belief that dream control could provide a means of influencing future events.

The article also emphasizes the Temiar understanding of reciprocity. According to the Temiar, their dream tradition can only open itself to people who are willing to share their own dreams as well. For this reason, although the Temiar respected Geoffrey Benjamin as a researcher, they believed that they did not necessarily share all of their beliefs about dreams with him because, in their view, he did not share his own dream experiences with them.
