= The Light Behind the Shade =

1990 Finnish documentary film

- Finnish: Valo varjon takaa
- Directed by: Arto Halonen
- Produced by: Arto Halonen
- Starring: Kari Mikkonen
- Production companies: Art Films Production AFP; Yleisradio TV2/Urheiluohjelmat; Yleisradio TV2/Yhteistuotannot
- Release date: 1990
- Running time: 46 minutes
- Country: Finland
- Language: Finnish

The Light Behind the Shade (Finnish: Valo varjon takaa) is a 1990 documentary film by Arto Halonen about 110 meters hurdler Arto Bryggare, who attempts to return to the top of his sport after rupturing his Achilles tendon. Filming began in 1988 and continued for a year and a half.

The Light Behind the Shade premiered on Yle's television channels in the spring of 1990. According to film critic Kari Salminen of Turun Sanomat, the film is a unique portrait of an athlete, as it gives its "subject" ample space to express his own views: "It does not overlook his achievements, but also reveals a subjective depth behind them. This approach would not even be possible in conventional sports programmes." The film was also screened in November 1990 at Kettupäivät, a showcase for Finnish short and documentary films. Helena Ylänen, a film critic for Helsingin Sanomat, wrote that "Halonen's work is unusually tightly constructed and dynamically varied; it has a distinctly professional feel while still being clearly personal."

The DVD release of the film in 2005 included bonus material covering Bryggare's later career, as well as interviews with people close to him. The DVD was released together with Halonen's other documentary film, Ringside (1992), about boxer Tarmo Uusivirta.

== Credits ==
- Directed by: Arto Halonen
- Written by: Arto Halonen
- Cinematography by: Arto Halonen
- Edited by: Arto Halonen
- Sound by: Kari Mikkonen, Tanja Suonmaa
- Music by: Kari Mikkonen
- Production company: Art Films Production AFP, TV2/ Urheiluohjelmat, Yleisradio/TV2/Yhteistuotannot
