= A Patriotic Man =

- Directed by: Arto Halonen
- Written by: Arto Halonen; Jouni K. Kemppainen
- Produced by: Arto Halonen
- Starring: Martti Suosalo; Pamela Tola
- Cinematography: Hannu-Pekka Vitikainen
- Edited by: Tuuli Kuittinen
- Music by: Alfi Kabiljo
- Production companies: Art Films production MP-Films
- Distributed by: Future Film Distribution
- Release date: 4 December 2013 (Finland)
- Running time: 97 minutes
- Country: Finland
- Language: finnish
- Budget: 1 731 925 €

A Patriotic Man (Finnish: Isänmaallinen mies) is a 2013 Finnish comedy film directed by Arto Halonen. The screenplay was written by Halonen and Helsingin Sanomat journalist Jouni K. Kemppainen. The film was produced by Art Films production, with Croatian company MP-Films as a production partner. Filming took place in Finland, Croatia, and Slovenia. A Patriotic Man is the first-ever film co-production between Finland and Croatia.

The film is set in the 1980s and serves as a companion piece to Halonen's 2012 documentary When Heroes Lie (Sinivalkoinen valhe), which examines the doping scandal involving the Finnish national cross-country skiing team.

The cast includes Martti Suosalo, Pamela Tola, Janne Reinikainen, Hannu-Pekka Björkman, Mikko Kouki, Eppu Salminen, Kari Ketonen, Pirjo Lonka, Satu Paavola, Katja Küttner, and Lauri Tilkanen.

The film also features brief appearances by former world-record sprinter Ben Johnson, who was caught doping, and Timo Seppälä, the longtime medical director of SUEK ry (FINCIS).

Halonen has said that he spoke with Ben Johnson about doping during evening conversations after filming. These discussions also touched on Johnson's trauma. As Halonen recalled, Johnson said: “That humiliation and shame never go away.” Johnson also expressed his concerns to Halonen about the current state of doping and the activities of the private laboratories operating behind the scenes.

== Plot ==
Set in the 1980s, the film follows Toivo (Martti Suosalo), who loses his job and goes to donate blood at his wife's (Pirjo Lonka) suggestion. A medical examination reveals that his blood has an unusually high hemoglobin level, making him a perfect recruit for the Finnish national cross-country skiing team's doping efforts. He is recruited to provide blood transfusions for Aino (Pamela Tola), a promising young skier. As Aino's performance improves, the two develop a close bond.

However, a crisis shortly before the Olympics threatens to derail their plans, and Toivo becomes central to the team's hopes of success.

== Distribution ==
The film had its international premiere at the Seattle International Film Festival, after which it was screened at several other festivals, including the Warsaw International Film Festival. It was also included in a US tour of Talk Cinema, organized by film critic Harlan Jacobson.

In Finland, A Patriotic Man premiered in cinemas at the end of 2013 and attracted approximately 35,000 viewers. The film made its television debut in 2016 and was among the most-watched films broadcast on Yleisradio's channels that year.

The film received nominations at the Jussi Awards in the categories of Best Actor (Martti Suosalo) and Best Makeup Design (Riikka Virtanen).

In later interviews, Halonen has revealed that the film's story, including the character of Toivo, is based on actual events and a real person.
