= Jaana Saarinen =

Finnish actress (born 1955)

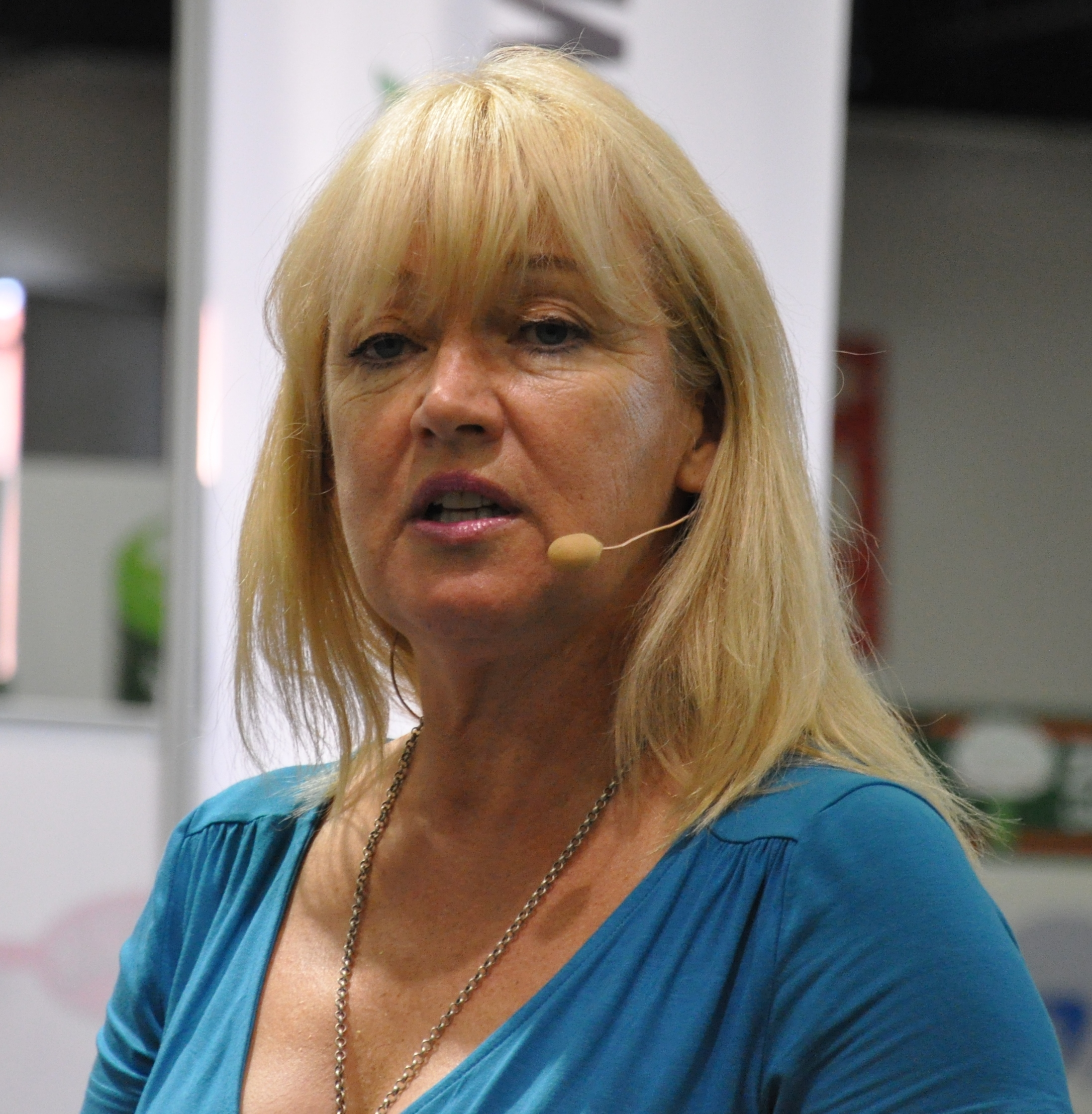
- Jaana Saarinen (2009)
- Born: Jaana Esikko Saarinen; 22 June 1955 (age 70); Helsinki, Finland

Jaana E. Saarinen (born 22 June 1955 in Helsinki) is a Finnish actress. She is famous for the Finnish soap opera Salatut elämät, where she played Maarit Salin from 1999 to 2004, 2007 to 2008 and 2015. For 25 years, Saarinen was involved with the Kotka City Theatre from 1981 to 2006. She took part in the very first Thilia Thalia competition in 1983 and came third. Hannu Salminen and Tuija Piepponen, representatives of the Kotka City Theatre, won the competition that year.

In autumn 2007, Saarinen lost a vote for chair of the Finnish Actors' Union to actor Mikko Hänninen of the Tampere Theatre.

Saarinen won a Venla award for best actress on 12 January 2007 for her role in the 3-part miniseries Hopeanuolet (Silver Arrows) directed by Auli Mantila.
