= Princess (2010 film) =

- Finnish theatrical poster
- Directed by: Arto Halonen
- Written by: Pirjo Toikka; Arto Halonen; Paavo Westerberg
- Produced by: Arto Halonen
- Starring: Katja Küttner; Samuli Edelmann; Krista Kosonen; Peter Franzén; Pirkka-Pekka Petelius
- Cinematography: Hannu-Pekka Vitikainen
- Edited by: Tuuli Kuittinen
- Music by: Tuomas Kantelinen
- Production company: Art Films productio
- Release date: 24 August 2010 (EIFF)
- Running time: 104 minutes
- Country: Finland
- Language: Finnish
- Budget: 1 624 029 €

Princess is a 2010 Finnish drama film directed by Arto Halonen and co-written by Halonen together with Pirjo Toikka and Paavo Westerberg. Princess premiered in Finnish cinemas on 10 September 2010 and became the most-watched film in Finland during its first week of release. The film remained in first place for five weeks, making it one of the most successful Finnish films of the 2000s. The film attracted more than 300,000 cinema viewers.

Princess tells the story of a real person, Anna Lappalainen (1896–1988), who was diagnosed manic-depressive and schizophrenic. The film depicts her extraordinary life at Kellokoski Psychiatric Hospital, where she became known as the "Princess of Kellokoski."

== Synopsis ==
Anna Lappalainen (Katja Küttner, née Kukkola), a cabaret dancer who has been moved from one foster home to another, ends up in a psychiatric hospital. It soon becomes clear to the staff and other patients that Lappalainen suffers from a powerful delusion. She claims to be a Princess, a member of the royal family from Buckingham Palace. Although the Princess herself is also among those receiving treatment, helping others becomes her mission in life.

The Princess’s court consists of a group of fellow patients (including Krista Kosonen, Peter Franzén and Pirkka-Pekka Petelius). Her realm extends to the village of Kellokoski and its bank manager (Tapio Liinoja). The medical staff, however, cannot agree on whether it is best for Lappalainen to be allowed to live within and be supported in her delusion. Doctor Grotenfelt (Samuli Edelmann) advocates modern methods of treatment, while a new invention, the lobotomy, is also making its way into Finland.

Eventually, Kellokoski Hospital becomes the Princess’s castle, where Anna establishes her court. Over the years, her personality earns admiration and respect from fellow patients, hospital staff and the entire surrounding village community.

== Production ==
The film was produced by Halonen, with Art Films production serving as the production company. The Finnish Central Association for Mental Health was an important partner in the project.

The film was shot during 2009, with outdoor filming taking place, among other locations, in Kellokoski, Niittylahti and Stockholm.

== Awards ==
Director Halonen was awarded the Helsinki City Culture Prize for his work, the Finnish Mental Health Association Award, and the National Recognition Award for Civic Activity. Halonen was the first cultural professional to receive the National Recognition Award for Civic Activity.

Halonen received the Helsinki City Culture Prize for his significant work in documentary filmmaking, for founding the DocPoint festival, and for his internationally acclaimed films dealing with socially significant issues, including Princess. The citation for the mental health award stated that Halonen had, "through his work, spoken in favour of tolerance, acceptance of difference and caring for others."

Katja Küttner, who played Lappalainen, received the Jussi Award for Best Actress as well as the Finnish Actors’ Union’s Film Actor of the Year Award. She was also named Best Actress at the Tallinn Black Nights Film Festival (PÖFF).

In addition to Estonia, Princess received a theatrical release in France on 24 August 2016. Its distribution rights were also sold to countries including the Netherlands, Belgium, Luxembourg, Greece, Sweden, Switzerland, Slovakia and the Czech Republic.

The film had its international premiere in autumn 2010 at the Montreal World Film Festival. The film was selected to compete in the First Films World Competition, a category intended for debut feature films. The film was nominated for the Golden Zenith award for Best First Film.

Following Montreal, the film was screened at numerous festivals in countries including the United States, Germany, Japan, Italy, Canada and the Netherlands. At the Cape Winelands Film Festival, the film received the Grand Prix Jury Award for Best Film.

In the United States, Princess was also shown in several locations as part of the popular Talk Cinema programme curated by renowned critic Harlan Jacobson, where it received a warm reception. At the Teaneck International Film Festival in New Jersey, Princess was awarded Best Feature Fiction Film. At the EuropaCinema Festival in Italy, the film won the festival’s second prize. In Portugal, it received an honourable mention from the jury at the Festroia International Film Festival, and it was nominated for the Dragon Award for Best Nordic Film at the Gothenburg International Film Festival.

Princess was selected to represent Finland at several European Union Film Festivals (EU Film Festival). In November 2012, the film was screened in Lebanon at the 19th European Film Festival at the Metropolis Cinema in Beirut. In spring 2013, the film toured India as part of the EU Film Festival themed "Celebrating Women." The film was also screened at other international festivals focusing on women in cinema, including the Women’s Film Festival in Vermont, United States, in March 2012.

== Reception ==
=== Reviews ===
Mikael Saarinen of Episodi magazine awarded the film four stars. He wrote that "Halonen successfully handles his first feature-length film and manages to create an interesting portrait of the era and, above all, a portrait of a person whose determination literally moved mountains."

Tina Myllyniemi of the Film-O-Holic film website also gave the film four stars and commented that it portrayed "the different sides of humanity convincingly and movingly; on the one hand, the lust for power and cynicism, and on the other, the ability to put oneself in another person’s position."

Helsingin Sanomat awarded the film three stars. Veli-Pekka Lehtonen wrote in the Nyt weekly supplement on 10 September 2010: "The film is professionally made. The central actors, composer Tuomas Kantelinen and cinematographer Hannu-Pekka Vitikainen foremost among them, create a convincing depiction of post-war Kellokoski and its surroundings."

== The Story of the Princess Elsewhere ==
Princess musical was written by Halonen and Toikka and directed by Halonen. The musical premiered on the main stage of the Tampere Workers’ Theatre in 2013. The music was composed by Tuomas Kantelinen, who also composed the music for the film. The musical was the most-watched production at the Tampere Workers’ Theatre during the autumn 2013 and spring 2014 seasons.

A making-of documentary, Prinsessan hovissa (2010), was released in connection with the launch of the film. The documentary tells the story of Anna Lappalainen’s life and personality through the people who knew her. It also follows the various stages of production of the fictional film Princess and includes interviews with the filmmakers and actors. Prinsessan hovissa was directed and written by Halonen, Italo Moncada, Venla Hellstedt and Vilhelmiina Vilhunen.

A large-scale school campaign was also organized in connection with the film in cooperation with RAY, the Finnish Central Association for Mental Health and Koulukino. The aim of the campaign was to increase understanding of differences and, consequently, reduce prejudice and negative attitudes.

Around the same time as the film was released, a non-fiction book about Anna Lappalainen, The Princess of Kellokoski (Kellokosken prinsessa), was also published. It was written by Ilkka Raitasuo and Terhi Siltala. Raitasuo had collected material about Lappalainen for many years while also working as her nurse at Kellokoski Hospital.

In 2026, a spoken theatre adaptation of Princess, written by Halonen and Toikka and directed by Heini Tola, premiered at Öljymäki Summer Theatre. The production sold out in record time.
