= When Heroes Lie =

- Film poster
- Finnish: Sinivalkoinen valhe
- Directed by: Arto Halonen
- Written by: Jouni K. Kemppainen; Arto Halonen; Kevin Frazier
- Starring: Arto Halonen; Paavo M. Petäjä
- Production company: Art Films production AFP Oy
- Release date: 5 October 2012
- Running time: 119 minutes
- Country: Finland
- Language: Finnish
- Budget: 300 000 €

When Heroes Lie is a documentary film completed in 2012 and directed by Arto Halonen. The screenplay was written by Halonen, Jouni K. Kemppainen, and Kevin Frazier. The film examines the history of doping in cross-country skiing from the 1970s onwards and explores major doping cases in Finnish skiing. Its scope expands to consider doping culture and related suspicions in skiing on a global scale.

The film focuses in particular on the events of the 2001 FIS Nordic World Ski Championships in Lahti, the doping scandal involving Finnish skiers, and the STT doping trial, which resumed in 2011. Based on extensive background research, the film also presents new information about the doping culture in Finnish cross-country skiing, including its origins, extent, and key figures.

The events depicted in the film take place in Finland, Italy, Sweden, and Norway. According to the film, a similar, largely unspoken doping culture existed in these countries, where success was pursued by any means necessary. Director Halonen explained that the film sought to portray a system resembling omertà, in which athletes understand that doping is often almost the only way to succeed in a situation where a significant proportion of competitors at the top level use prohibited substances. The film argues that this system places responsibility on individual athletes while leaving the wider environment in which they operate untouched.

== Release ==
In Finland, the film premiered at the Helsinki International Film Festival – Love & Anarchy, where it was screened as the opening film of the Finnish Gala. Its international premiere took place at the International Documentary Film Festival Amsterdam (IDFA). It also served as the opening film of the DocPoint Tallinn festival. The film has additionally been broadcast on television in Norway, Estonia, and Sweden.

In Finland, When Heroes Lie attracted extensive media attention and sparked lively public debate. Critics responded positively to the film. Tuomas Riskala of Iltalehti, for example, described it as “high-quality documentary storytelling with considerable social significance.” Linda Mäki-Kala of Me Naiset noted that Halonen had approached the doping culture in cross-country skiing with admirable persistence and honesty in his bold documentary.In a review for Yle, author Juha Hurme described When Heroes Lie as a genuine work of art: “As a genuine, multi-layered work of art and a complex cultural text, it is also funny in a horrifying way—a literally terrifyingly funny story.” However, the film also encountered opposition, and an attempt was made to prevent its screening in Ostrobothnia.

The film’s premiere in Norway also provoked strong reactions, particularly after it was featured as the main subject of NRK’s flagship news broadcasts. The allegations presented in the film sparked widespread debate among the public and within the Norwegian Ski Federation.

A major source of controversy was a claim made by an anonymous source close to the inner circle of Norwegian skiing, who described the doping histories of Norway, Sweden, and Finland as similar.

The controversy led to extensive public debate in Norway, with numerous former and then-active elite skiers and sports officials publicly responding to the allegations. Björn Dählie, Thomas Alsgaard, and Bente Skari denied the claims, while Marit Bjørgen and others also commented on the doping debate sparked by the documentary. Norwegian television covered the issue extensively. Inggard Lereim, who had served in medical roles within the International Ski Federation for decades, also defended himself during a live broadcast.

The director-general of NRK issued an unusually public statement supporting the film, defending the broadcaster’s decision to feature it in its main news coverage and to show it uncut, citing reliable sources and evidence.

The film also examined doping culture in Italian skiing through blood-monitoring records seized by the police. It features Italian anti-doping investigator Sandro Donati, who has served as an expert in Italian police investigations into doping. The film examines the blood values of several national-team skiers, including world champion Maurilio De Zolt and Olympic champion Manuela Di Centa, in connection with possible EPO use.

Di Centa, who had served as a member of the Italian parliament, denied the allegations presented in the film and announced in 2012 that she was considering legal action against Donati. Donati considered such a lawsuit unlikely, stating: “Those who threaten legal action ultimately do not actually take their cases to court because they are afraid that their actions will be exposed.” No charges have been filed since.

== Awarads and recognition ==
The film received the Quality Award from the Finnish State Film Art Committee. It was also nominated for the Lumilapio Award for investigative journalism. In addition, it was among the most-watched films on Yle’s television channels in 2013. The original idea for the film was proposed to Halonen by Iikka Vehkalahti, then head of Yle’s documentary department.

== Orion and supplementary material ==
The film examined the cooperation between the Finnish Ski Association and the pharmaceutical company Orion, which began in the mid-1990s. According to the film, the collaboration involved the development and supply of Ringersteril infusion solution for use in skiing. Ringersteril is an infusion solution similar to Hemohes. Hemohes was used to temporarily lower haemoglobin levels so that athletes could pass haemoglobin tests. The substance played a central role in the 2001 Lahti doping scandal. Orion manufactured and supplied Ringersteril infusion solution to the Finnish Ski Association without the required authorisation. This was unlawful, but by the time the matter was investigated, the offence was time-barred and no criminal proceedings followed.

In 2012, the filmmakers sent an open letter to Paula Risikko, then Minister of Social Affairs and Health, calling for stricter oversight and investigative procedures in the pharmaceutical industry. The letter highlighted the cooperation between Orion and the Finnish Ski Association, as well as shortcomings in the regulatory system. Risikko responded that she had asked Fimea, the Finnish Medicines Agency, to arrange discussions with the police to improve cooperation.

Halonen also produced supplementary material related to the film, including The Finnish Ski Association and Orion, Immo Kuutsa has Something to Say, Wrong Questions, What has Punkkinen Brought to Kaisa Mäkäräinen’s Coaching?, and Lessons from Doping Scandals for Jarmo Riski.

== See also ==
- Blood doping
- Erythropoietin
- Hemohes
