= The Two Faces =

1987 Finnish animated short film

- Finnish: Kahdet kasvot
- Directed by: Arto Halonen
- Written by: Arto Halonen
- Produced by: Arto Halonen
- Production company: Art Films Production AFP
- Release date: 1987
- Running time: 9.5 minutes
- Country: Finland
- Language: Finnish

The Two Faces (Finnish: Kahdet kasvot) is a 1987 traditional hand-drawn animation directed by Arto Halonen. The film was made in collaboration with animator Timo Kokkonen, has a running time of 9.5 minutes, and was composed by Kari Mikkonen. The film was broadcast on MTV3, and was Halonen's first film to be shown on television.

The production of the film took approximately two years. The film was funded with grants from the Finnish Cultural Foundation and the Joensuu Cultural Committee. Kokkonen stated in an interview with a newspaper that he had drawn approximately 3,000 frames for the film.

The film follows the journeys of two men, exploring human nature's unchanging character, revenge, and violence. The story begins in the Stone Age and progresses to the modern era, depicting the brutality of human nature and humanity's inability to free itself from the burdens of the past.

== Credits ==
- Directed by: Arto Halonen
- Produced by: Arto Halonen
- Written by: Arto Halonen
- Animated by: Timo Kokkonen
- Color process by: Merja Lappalainen-Vihonen, Tarja Hyvärinen, Satu Sipiläinen, Timo Kokkonen
- Music by: Kari Mikkonen
- Edited by: Arto Halonen
