= The Stars' Caravan =

2000 Finnish documentary film

- Finnish: Taivasta vasten
- Directed by: Arto Halonen
- Written by: Arto Halonen
- Based on: Richard Manin; Carlo Cresto-Dina
- Produced by: Kristiina Pervilä
- Cinematography: Pini Hellsted
- Edited by: Olli Soinio
- Music by: Edward Vesala; Iro Haarla
- Production company: Millennium Film
- Distributed by: Senso Films Oy
- Release date: 29 September 2000
- Running time: 60 minutes
- Country: Finland
- Language: Kyrgyz

The Stars' Caravan (Finnish: Taivasta vasten) is a 2000 Finnish documentary film produced by Millennium Film and Kristiina Pervilä, made as a co-production in Kyrgyzstan. Written and directed by Arto Halonen, it concludes Halonen's documentary series focusing on Asia. The film is based on an original idea by Richard Manin and Carlo Cresto-Dina and it explores film as a tool of propaganda, its power to manipulate and its role as a messenger between different cultures.

The film's music was composed by Edward Vesala together with his partner, Iro Haarla. This was Vesala's final composing work before his death, and the film is dedicated to his memory.

== Reception ==
The film was screened at several international film festivals. It premiered in the main competition of the International Documentary Film Festival Amsterdam (IDFA). In addition, the film was shown at the Gotheburg Film Festival in Sweden and in the Nordic Film competition at the Hot Docs Canadian International Documentary Festival in Toronto.

Film critic and documentary filmmaker Peter Wintonick wrote in his extensive article concerning The Stars' Caravan in the Canadian film magazine POV: "A very subtle, and engaging. I really though his (Halonen) film was ingenious, honest and simply complex for the way it interwove history, politics, exotic culture, fiction and documentary into one." Wintonick also named the film as his favorite at the 2000 IDFA documentary film festival, describing it as "a very subtle Finnish film."

In 2008, film critic Dennis Grunes included the film on his list of the 100 greatest Eastern European or Eastern European-shot films of all time. It is one of only three films from the year 2000 to make the list. Critic Vadim Rizov has described the film as a "masterpiece."

The Stars' Caravan received the Finnish State Quality Production Award.
