= Taneli Mäkelä =

Finnish actor, singer and writer (born 1959)

- Born: 10 March 1959 (age 67); Espoo, Finland
- Occupation: Actor
- Years active: 1985–present

Taneli Mäkelä (born 10 March 1959) is a Finnish actor, singer and writer. He appeared in more than seventy films since 1985.

== Selected filmography ==
Film
Year	Title	Role	Notes
2017	Napapiirin sankarit 3	Timo	
2016	Onnenonkija	Esa	
2016	Love Records – Anna mulle Lovee	Anders Blom	
2015	Hevisaurus-elokuva	Maxim	
2015	Luokkakokous	lääkäri	
2015	Viikossa aikuiseksi	Jouko	
2012	Härmä	Sakari Kantola	
2012	Vuosaari	Milla's father	
2010	Moomins and the Comet Chase		voice
2010	Jos rakastat	Ada's father	
2008	Putoavia enkeleitä	Aila's father	
2008	Kummeli Alivuokralainen	A man at the gas station	
2008	Kolmistaan	Martti	
2007	DaLintsi-koodi	Multiple roles	
2006	Kummelin Jackpot	Eikka	
2005	FC Venus	Lauri Rautakoski	
2004	Väärät kengät	Ritzi	
2003	Beatlehem	Eero Saarivuo	
2003	Helmiä ja sikoja	Announcer	
2002	Kylmä muuri		
2002	Haaveiden kehä	Maalismaa	
1997	Vaiennut kylä	Pukari	
1996	Tie naisen sydämeen	Pirjo Haarikka	
1995	Tyttöjä ja jäätelöä	Patu's mother's boyfriend	
1995	Koti	Man	
1994	Anita	Niilo Kalevi Rotko	
1994	Karavaani	Keuhko	
1992	Korpirastas		
1990	Vääpeli Körmy ja marsalkan sauva	Sergeant Jääskeläinen	
1989	Talvisota	Martti Hakala	
1988	Pullahiiri	Olli	
1988	Katsastus	Priest	
1988	Pohjanmaa	Erkki Hakala	
1987	Fakta homma	Aulis Kaakko	
1987	Lain ulkopuolella	Sakari Nevanen	
1987	Tropic of Ice	Gunman	
1986	Akallinen mies		
1986	Liian iso keikka	Police officer #3	
1986	Kaivatut	Vesa	
1986	Skorpionin tanssi		
1986	Viimeinen ottelu	Timo Leppänen	
1985	Lumilinna		

TV
Year	Title	Role	Notes
2022, 2024	Helsinki Syndrome	Jarmo Kiiski	14 episodes
2018	Arctic Circle	Esko Kangasniemi	
2009–2012	Kotikatu	Arto Maasalmi	
1993	Hobitit	Frodo Baggins (Frodo Reppuli)	
1988	Akkaa päälle		writer
1986–1988	Fakta homma		
