= Stupid Young Heart =

2018 film

- Film poster
- Directed by: Selma Vilhunen
- Written by: Kirsikka Saari
- Produced by: Venla Hellstedt; Elli Toivoniemi
- Starring: Pihla Viitala; Ville Haapasalo; Katja Kukkola
- Cinematography: Lisabi Fridell
- Edited by: Yva Fabricius; Michal Leszczylowski
- Music by: Timo Naomi Dirksen
- Production companies: Tuffi Films; Windmill Film; Hob; Windmill Film
- Distributed by: Nordisk Film
- Release dates: 7 September 2018 (TIFF); 12 October 2018
- Running time: 102 minutes
- Country: Finland
- Language: Finnish

Stupid Young Heart (Finnish: Hölmö nuori sydän) is a 2018 Finnish drama film directed by Selma Vilhunen. It was screened in the Contemporary World Cinema section at the 2018 Toronto International Film Festival. It was selected as the Finnish entry for the Best International Feature Film at the 92nd Academy Awards, but it was not nominated.

== Plot ==
Pregnant teen Kiira and her boyfriend Lenni struggle to make ends meet. Further complications arise when Lenni joins a group of neo-Nazis.

== Cast ==
- Pihla Viitala as Ansku
- Ville Haapasalo as Janne
- Katja Kukkola as Satu

== Reception ==
Barry Hertz from The Globe and Mail gave the film 2.5 out of 4, stating: "With Stupid Young Heart, director Selma Vilhunen attempts to dissect the attraction a fringe group might offer for the youthful and dispossessed, and while her intentions are noble, the execution is as shaky as the current geopolitical environment." Michael McNeely from "That Shelf" said: "Limited characterization and a static plot prevent the film from soaring."

Michelle da Silva from the newspaper NOW Toronto liked the film giving it 4 stars out of five, describing it as "much more than a teen romance" and writing: "Vilhunen explores real hardships of the working class, and her portrayal of teens is heartbreakingly authentic. Honkonen and Ristseppä give sensitive performances that will haunt you after the final scene." For The Canadian Press, David Friend said, "while 'Stupid Young Heart' ties up a complicated story too easily, it draws some light to how fringe groups find weakness and exploit it for their own agenda."

== See also ==
- List of submissions to the 92nd Academy Awards for Best International Feature Film
- List of Finnish submissions for the Academy Award for Best International Feature Film
