= Karmapa - Two Ways of Divinity =

- Directed by: Arto Halonen; Co-director; Viliam Poltikovič
- Written by: Arto Halonen; Viliam Poltikovič
- Produced by: Arto Halonen
- Narrated by: Peter Coyote (English); Esko Salminen (Finnish)
- Cinematography: Timo Heinänen; Jari Pollari; Camera assistants Miroslav Souček; Harri Sipilä
- Edited by: Arto Halonen
- Music by: Vesa Mäkinen
- Production companies: Art Films Production AFP; Yle
- Release date: March 13, 1998
- Running time: 58 minutes
- Country: Finland

Karmapa – Two Ways of Divinity is a 1998 documentary film shot in Tibet and China between 1994 and 1998 directed by Arto Halonen. The film received the European Union’s humanitarian ECHO Award.

Karmapa – Two Ways of Divinity explores Tibet’s spiritual community and China’s policies toward Tibet. It focuses on two high-ranking Tibetan Buddhist Karmapa lamas, the controversy surrounding their selection, and China’s efforts to use the position of the Karmapa for political purposes. The Dalai Lama also plays a central role in the film.

According to director Halonen, the film deals with the persecution of religion and culture in Tibet and China’s infiltration to the Tibetan Buddhist community. Halonen stated that China’s aim was to select the next Dalai Lama as a puppet ruler of Tibet. He said that this information was based on views expressed to him by Chinese authorities.

Chinese authorities monitored the filming of the documentary in Tibet and China and attempted to influence the final result. China also tried to prevent the film from being screened at a Hong Kong Film Festival in 1999.

A companion documentary, Karmapa - a Voyage on the Roof of the World, was also released in the same year. It documented the making of Karmapa – Two Ways of Divinity and received an award at Kettu-päivät. Both films were co-productions with Yle TV2’s Dokumenttiprojekti.

Halonen was joined by Czech filmmaker Viliam Poltikovič, who served as the film’s second screenwriter and co-director. In the Finnish version, the film is narrated by Esko Salminen, while the international version is narrated by Peter Coyote. The DVD release includes additional interviews with, among others, Pekka Haavisto, Jan Olof Mallander, and the film’s financier Jarmo Jääskeläinen. The material discusses the background of the film and the filming process.

Karmapa – Two Ways of Divinity received wide international attention and was theatrically released in several countries, including Finland, Switzerland and Germany. The film was screened at numerous film festivals, with its international premiere taking place at the IDFA documentary film festival in Amsterdam. In addition to the ECHO Award, the film received awards for Best Production and Editing at the Gava Film Festival in Spain. In Finland, it received The Finnish State Quality Production Award.

== Visa denial in 2008 ==
In 2008, Veikkaus, a partner of the Finnish Olympic Committee, invited prominent figures from Finland to attend the Beijing Olympics. Halonen was among the invited. Veikkaus CCO Ilkka Juva described Halonen as an important figure in the film industry and therefore a guest of Veikkaus.

The Finnish Olympic Committee applied for visas for its invited guests. In June 2008, however, China rejected Halonen’s visa application, making him the only one of Veikkaus’s invited guests whose visa was denied. Veikkaus could not influence the decision because it had not applied for the visa itself, but it ensured that the Finnish Olympic Committee would handle Halonen’s case. The Olympic Committee was not given a reason for the visa denial.

The decision sparked widespread discussion both in Finland and internationally. Finnish film organizations condemned the decision and called on political leaders to take action in support of freedom of expression. Newspaper editorials and politicians also raised the visa denial and questioned China’s suitability as host of the Olympics. The Finnish government and Prime Minister Matti Vanhanen were criticized for failing to speak out on Halonen’s behalf or demand an explanation from China for the visa denial.

According to Halonen, the reason for the decision was his Karmapa film, which had provoked strong criticism and anger among Chinese audiences and authorities following its release.
