= Miami (2017 film) =

2017 Finnish drama film

- Film poster
- Directed by: Zaida Bergroth
- Written by: Zaida Bergroth
- Starring: Krista Kosonen
- Release date: 4 August 2017
- Running time: 119 minutes
- Country: Finland
- Language: Finnish

Miami is a 2017 Finnish drama film directed by Zaida Bergroth. It was screened in the Contemporary World Cinema section at the 2017 Toronto International Film Festival.

== Cast ==
- Krista Kosonen as Angela
- Sonja Kuittinen as Anna
- Alex Anton as Timi
- Juhan Ulfsak as Eduard
- Janne Reinikainen as Jouni
