= Shadow of the Holy Book =

2007 Finnish documentary film

- Finnish: Pyhän kirjan varjo
- Directed by: Arto Halonen
- Written by: Kevin Frazier; Arto Halonen
- Produced by: Arto Halonen
- Starring: Arto Halonen; Kevin Frazier; Farid Tuhbatullin; Ruslan Tuhbatullin
- Cinematography: Hannu Vitikainen; Timo Heinänen; Arto Halonen
- Edited by: Samu Heikkilä
- Music by: Timo Peltola
- Production companies: Art Films Production; Dschoint Ventschr Filmproduktion; Kamoli Films
- Release dates: 2007 (IDFA); 29 February 2008 (Finland)
- Running time: 90 minutes
- Country: Finland
- Budget: 437,845.71€

Shadow of the Holy Book (Finnish: Pyhän kirjan varjo) is a 2007 documentary film directed by Arto Halonen. The film was written by Halonen and Kevin Frazier. It examines the totalitarian system of Turkmenistan, the Ruhnama cult that prevailed in the country, and the role of international corporations in maintaining it.

Shadow of the Holy Book examines Turkmenistan's propaganda book Ruhnama and the personality cult associated with it. The documentary reveals how Western corporations translated the work into their own languages and thereby supported the country's authoritarian regime. At the same time, the film examines how international economic agreements affect the people of Turkmenistan, who are left as the weakest party in the country's political and economic system.

Shadow of the Holy Book had its world premiere in the main competition of the International Documentary Film Festival Amsterdam (IDFA), after which it was widely screened at international film festivals. The film was shown at approximately 100 festivals around the world. These included the Museum of Modern Art's (MoMA) Documentary Fortnight in New York City, as well as Canada's Hot Docs and Sheffield DocFest. The film was also screened at the Thessaloniki International Documentary Festival, where Halonen was presented with the festival's Lifetime Achievement Award in connection with a special screening of Shadow of the Holy Book.

The film won the Grand Prix at the International Human Rights Film Festival in Paris and the Audience Award at the Taiwan International Film Festival. It also received a Special Jury Award at the Batumi International Art-House Film Festival in Georgia, as well as the Jurnal TV Special Award and an Honourable Mention from the jury at the CRONOGRAF International Documentary Film Festival in Moldova. In Finland, the film was awarded a The Finnish State Quality Production Award.

The film was nominated for the Prix Arte for Best Documentary of the year, as awarded by the European Film Academy. The award has been presented since 1989, and Shadow of the Holy Book was the second Finnish documentary to receive a nomination.

In 2008, the film was selected as the opening film of Mexico's DocsDF documentary film festival. In 2015, it was selected as one of the 29 best documentaries of the festival's first decade. In 2020, as part of the festival's 15th-anniversary celebrations, Shadow of the Holy Book was selected as the best film of 2008.

Mikko Piela of Uusi Suomi welcomed the fact that Finland was once again producing journalistic documentaries after a long period, although he felt that Halonen's style perhaps resembled Michael Moore's too closely. Piela nevertheless believed that Moore would not have dared to tackle such a sensitive subject. In his review, he even suggested that Halonen should receive the State Award for Public Information.

== International distribution ==
Shadow of the Holy Book achieved wide international distribution. In Germany, the film was released in cinemas, and television rights were sold to 20 countries.

One of the film's major financiers was the American company ITVS (Independent Television Service), which also served as a co-producer. In the United States, the film was broadcast as part of the Independent Lens program on PBS and on the Sundance Channel. ITVS estimated that the film could reach as many as 54 million viewers in the United States. The documentary was also screened in American cities as part of the Community Cinema program, while California Newsreel handled its DVD and educational distribution in North America.

== Social impact ==
The film sparked international discussion about the role of corporations in supporting authoritarian states. During festival appearances, Halonen and Frazier highlighted connections between various countries and Turkmenistan and sought to initiate public discussion on the subject.

During Turkmen President Gurbanguly Berdimuhamedow's visit to the European Union, Halonen and Frazier sent him an open letter demanding the release of dissidents from prison and an end to the country's totalitarian system.

In Finland, the film also influenced political discussion. Halonen raised human rights issues in discussions with the then Foreign Minister Alexander Stubb as Stubb prepared to visit Turkmenistan in his capacity as Chairman-in-Office of the OSCE. According to Stubb, the film and his discussions with Halonen helped him understand the situation in the country before meeting Berdimuhamedow.

As a result of the discussion generated by Shadow of the Holy Book, the Finnish Ministry for Foreign Affairs commissioned a study on the ethical conduct of Finnish companies abroad from Merja Pentikäinen at the Erik Castrén Institute, headed by Martti Koskenniemi. The study was published under the title Business Activities and Human Rights and served as background material for the Finnish Government's human rights report. Halonen also founded the open-access Freedom for Sale website, which "informs, investigates and monitors" human rights and the activities of the business world.

== Book ==
Based on the film, Frazier and Halonen wrote a book of the same name, which was one of ten finalists for Poland's prestigious Ryszard Kapuściński Award for literary reportage.

The book provided background on how Nokia Siemens Networks and Siemens had developed a more effective surveillance system for the Turkmen dictatorship to control the opposition. Halonen and Frazier first made this information public in an article by Petri Sajari published in Helsingin Sanomat on 27 February 2008. They subsequently discussed the issue in several articles, also calling on the government to take action to end Nokia's support for the activities of the Turkmen government.

Following Halonen and Frazier's revelations concerning Turkmenistan, Nokia Siemens Networks' controversial telecommunications surveillance deals with the Iranian government also came under public scrutiny. The system was used to spy on dissidents in Iran.
