= The Tank Man (2004 film) =

2004 Finnish short documentary film

- Finnish: Tynnyrimies
- Directed by: Arto Halonen
- Written by: Arto Halonen
- Produced by: Arto Halonen
- Cinematography: Arto Halonen; Jari Pollari
- Edited by: Arto Halonen; Sanna Liinamaa
- Music by: Tuomas Kantelinen
- Production company: Art Films Production
- Release date: 2004
- Running time: 17 minutes
- Country: Finland
- Language: Spanish

The Tank Man (Finnish: Tynnyrimies) is a 2004 short documentary film directed by Arto Halonen. The film tells the story of Cuban Jesús Perdomo Triguero, who has developed an acrobatic art form and a livelihood based on rolling gasoline barrels. The film is part of Halonen's series of documentaries set in Cuba, which consists of total of four films made between 2004 and 2007. The other films in the series are documentaries Conquistadors of Cuba (2005), The Legend (2005), and Confrontations in Cuba (2007).

The Tank Man received many international acknowledgments and was screened at more than 40 international film festivals. The film won the award for Best Documentary at the Magma Short Film Festival in Italy and received the jury's Coup de Cœur honorary award at the Film Insulaire festival in France. The film was also awarded an honorary jury prize at the Krakow Short Film Festival.
