= The Happy Wedding Day =

1993 Finnish comedy film

- Finnish: Onnellinen hääpäivä
- Directed by: Arto Halonen
- Written by: Arto Halonen
- Produced by: Kari Paukkunen
- Starring: Teijo Eloranta; Minna Pirilä
- Cinematography: Jukka Tuomisto
- Edited by: Kari Leppälä; Arto Halonen
- Music by: Jukka Pääkkönen
- Production company: YLE TV2 Draama
- Release date: 1993
- Running time: 88 minutes
- Country: Finland
- Language: Finnish

The Happy Wedding Day (Finnish: Onnellinen hääpäivä) is a 1993 Finnish comedy television film, written and directed by Arto Halonen. The film tells a story of a young groom who risks being late for his own wedding.

The film was shot in the summer of 1992 and produced by Yleisradio's TV2 Theatre Department. Its first television broadcast gained 830,000 viewers, making it the third most-watched film on Yle's channels in 1993. The film was also selected to represent Yleisradio at the Prix Europa television film festival.

When locations for the film were being sought, 15 churches refused to be used for filming because of concerns about the screenplay. Halonen emphasized that there was nothing inappropriate or suggestive in the script. Eventually, Kangasala church granted permission only a few days before filming began. In an interview with Ilta-Sanomat, Halonen discussed the film and said that some of the events were based on his own experiences.

== Cast ==
- Teijo Eloranta as Kalevi
- Minna Pirilä as Aino
- Minna Hokkanen as Liisa
- Matti Nurminen as Kauko
- Tuija Vuolle as Marjatta
- Jukka Sipilä as the Farmer
- Raija Paalanen as the Farmer's wife
- Otto Kanerva as Ari
- Lasse Karkjärvi as Mauri
