= Akkaa päälle =

Finnish comedy television series

The logo of Akkaa päälle

A screenshot of Akkaa päälle

Akkaa päälle is a Finnish comedy television series broadcast from 1994 to 2006 on MTV3. The series is directed by Anitta Pankkonen and written by Taneli Mäkelä and Pirkka-Pekka Petelius.

The programme won the Finnish View's Choice Award in 1997.

The series is set in the 1960s and is about four men trying to do something with their lives, with little result.

== Cast ==
- Taneli Mäkelä .... Kaino / ... (17 episodes, 1994–2006)
- Mikko Kivinen .... Aulis / ... (17 episodes, 1994–2006)
- Vesa Vierikko .... Anssi Ahlmgren / ... (16 episodes, 1994–2006)
- Pirkka-Pekka Petelius .... Sulo Tyynelä / ... (16 episodes, 1994–2006)
