= Home (1995 film) =

1995 Finnish drama film

- Finnish: Koti
- Directed by: Arto Halonen
- Written by: Melina Voipio
- Produced by: Kari Paukkunen
- Starring: Helena Kallio; Taneli Mäkelä; Johanna af Schultén
- Cinematography: Juhani Heikkonen
- Edited by: Sepi Niemi
- Music by: Jukka Pääkkönen
- Production company: Yle TV2 Draama
- Release date: 1995
- Running time: 65 minutes
- Country: Finland
- Language: Finnish

Home (Finnish: Koti) is a 1995 Finnish drama television film adapted and directed by Arto Halonen. The screenplay was written by Melina Voipio, and the film was produced by Yleisradio's TV2 Theatre Department.

Home portrays people from different backgrounds who share a common desire to live, grow, and find their place despite the burdens of home and the past. The film stars Helena Kallio, Taneli Mäkelä, and Johanna af Schultén.

Helsingin Sanomat critic Jukka Kajava considered the film a success in his review published in April 1995. According to Kajava, Voipio and Halonen captured the world of the story, its people, and the intersecting environments exceptionally well. He praised the film's expression and, in particular, the acting, describing it as understated and realistic.
