= Pavlov's Dogs (film) =

- Finnish: Pavlovin koirat
- Directed by: Arto Halonen
- Written by: Arto Halonen
- Produced by: Arto Halonen
- Cinematography: Vladimir Bashta; Arto Halonen; Dmitri Avrorin; Igor Tshernyshov
- Edited by: Sanna Liinamaa
- Music by: Tapani Rinne
- Production companies: Art Films Production AFP; Studio East-West
- Distributed by: Scanbox Entertainment Finland Oy
- Release dates: 28 March 2005 (IDFA, Amsterdam); 24 February 2006 (Finland)
- Running time: 68 minutes
- Country: Finland
- Language: Russian
- Budget: 255,000 €

Pavlov's Dogs (Finnish: Pavlovin koirat) is a 2005 documentary film directed by Arto Halonen. The film explores the manipulation of the human mind as a tool of power, both at the individual and societal levels. It takes its title from the experiments conducted on dogs by Ivan Pavlov. The document was filmed in Moscow, Russia.

The film follows Sergey Knyazev, a Russian psychologist and entertainment-industry professional who specializes in manipulating the human mind. Knyazev offers his wealthy clients extraordinary experiences, such as living as a beggar, as a response to the existential emptiness they experience. The film traces his career development from manipulating animals and individuals toward the broader control of the masses, eventually leading to his work with people close to Vladimir Putin.

Pavlov's Dogs premiered in the main competition of the International Documentary Film Festival Amsterdam (IDFA) and was screened at several international film festivals. The film was also shown at the Museum of Modern Art (MoMA) in New York as part of its Documentary Fortnight program, and it was the opening film at the Flahertiana festival in Russia. The film received theatrical distribution in both Finland and Sweden.

The Russian film festival Meetings in Siberia selected the film as one of the best films of all time. In Finland, Pavlov's Dogs received an honorable mention at Kettupäivät film festival in 2006 and was nominated for the Jussi Award for Best Documentary Film in 2007.

In his review for Variety, Ronnie Scheib described the film as "beautifully constructed," calling it a fascinating and skillful portrait of a Russian showman-psychologist. He highlighted how the film reflects the capitalist transformations of post-communist Russia and the phenomenon of "entertainment therapy" for the wealthy through stylized absurdities.
