= Murderous Trance =

- Film poster
- Directed by: Arto Halonen
- Written by: Arto Halonen
- Starring: Pilou Asbæk; Josh Lucas; Rade Šerbedžija; Cyron Melville; Sara Soulié
- Release date: 29 March 2018
- Running time: 102 minutes
- Countries: Finland; Denmark; Croatia
- Language: English

Murderous Trance (also titled The Guardian Angel) is a 2018 psychological thriller film written and directed by Arto Halonen and starring Pilou Asbæk, Josh Lucas, Rade Šerbedžija, Cyron Melville and Sara Soulié. It is based on a true story about the astonishing hypnosis murders that took place in Denmark in the 1950s. The hypnosis murders is the only known case where the court has been able to prove a hypnotizer guilty and sentence him for hypnotizing someone else to commit a crime.

Murderous Trance had its international festival premiere at the 34th Warsaw Film Festival in fall 2018. It was released in several countries during 2018–2020, including Finland, Denmark, France, Spain, UK and Japan. Nagra/myCinema brought the film to theatrical distribution in USA at the end of 2019, but it was cut short due to the COVID-19 lockdown in 2020. Murderous trance's North America digital release through MVD Entertainment Group is on 9 February 2021.

During the film's premiere in Finland and Denmark, it provoked a lot of discussion in the media among psychiatrists about the possibility to hypnotize people to act against their own morals, and the specialists unanimously confirmed it plausible. The most reputable newspaper in Finland, Helsingin Sanomat, published a comprehensive article in its science section about it. In the article Hannu Lauerma, an associate professor of psychiatry at the University of Turku, stated, ‘In a continuous long-term indirect influence by suggestion you can make things seem other than what they actually are. In that state a person doesn’t consider oneself doing anything bad, but instead truly believes that the act is good and inevitable.’

The independent film award Gold Movie Awards nominated Murderous Trance in four categories in its Best of the Year Award in London in January 2020. Murderous Trance won Best Feature Film Award and Best Actor Award (Josh Lucas).

The internationally produced movie was filmed in Denmark and Croatia. Halonen has also co-written a novel, The Guardian Angel, based on the same incidents. The book was published by WSOY and it has been translated into five languages: Finnish, Danish, Portuguese, Serbian and most recently to Italian in October 2020.

Arto Halonen was one of the first ones who were able to find the hypnosis murderer Palle Hardrup, who had changed his name after having been released from prison in 1967. Halonen is also one of the few to whom Palle Hardrup agreed to give interviews. They first met in 1997, twenty years before the movie was made.

== Plot ==
Criminal investigator Anders Olsen (Pilou Asbæk) begins to solve a case in which a bank robber shoots two bank clerks and runs into the streets of Copenhagen with the money. When arrested, he claims to have committed the crime alone. Some eyewitnesses say the robber seemed to have been in a trance, which makes the case even more complicated and peculiar. Olsen finds out that the accused has been in prison with the charismatic Bjørn Schouw Nielsen (Josh Lucas) and begins to suspect that Nielsen had hypnotized his fellow inmate to commit the crime for him. But could it be possible – and if so, how can the true perpetrator be caught? Olsen seeks help from a well-known psychiatrist specialized in hypnosis (Rade Šerbedžija), with whom Olsen delves deeper into the world of mental manipulation. Absorbed in the criminal investigation, Olsen does not realize that the mysterious Nielsen has secretly befriended his young wife (Sara Soulié). Soon the mysterious case touches him closer than he could have imagined.

== Cast ==
- Pilou Asbæk as Anders Olsen
- Josh Lucas as Bjørn Schouw Nielsen
- Cyron Melville as Palle Hardrup
- Rade Šerbedžija as Dr. Dabrowski
- Sara Soulié as Marie

== Production ==
The film was shot in Denmark and Croatia.

== Release ==
The film was released in theaters in Finland on 3 March 2018 and in the United States on 6 December 2019. Related to Murderous Trance's North America digital release on 9 February 2021 Josh Lucas visited the Talk and the Drew Barrymore Show.
