= Conquistadors of Cuba =

2005 Finnish documentary film

- Finnish: Kuuban valloittajat
- Directed by: Arto Halonen
- Written by: Arto Halonen
- Produced by: Arto Halonen
- Cinematography: Jari Pollari; Arto Halonen
- Edited by: Jukka Nykänen; Timo Peltola
- Music by: Tuomas Kantelinen
- Production companies: Art Films Production AFP; Dschoint Ventschr Filmproduktion
- Release date: 28 January 2005
- Running time: 87 minutes
- Country: Finland
- Language: Spanish

Conquistadors of Cuba (Finnish: Kuuban valloittajat) is a 2005 Finnish documentary film directed by Arto Halonen.

The film is part of Halonen's series of documentaries set in Cuba, which consists of total of four films made between 2004 and 2007. The other films in the series are the short documentaries The Tank Man (2004), The Legend (2005), and Confrontations in Cuba (2007).

The film explores Cuba's recent history through old American luxury cars that were once used by the country's rulers. A mechanic named Maximiliano is tasked with restoring Che Guevara's 1960 Chevrolet. The engine of the car once owned by Cuban dictator Fulgencio Batista is found in Maximiliano's own car, while the car of gangster Meyer Lansky is owned by his friend Mario Borges.

The film had its world premiere in 2005 at the international competition section of the prestigious Visions du Réel festival in Switzerland. In Finland, it was released in theaters later that year.

The film was screened at international film festivals including the Pan American Film Festival in Los Angeles, the Calgary International Film Festival in Canada, and Mexico's International Documentary Film Festival (DocsDF).
