= Kira Jääskeläinen =

Finnish-Polish documentary film director (born 1979)

- Born: 13 July 1979 (age 46); Warsaw, Poland
- Occupation: documentary film director
- Notable work: Takigaks – Once Were Hunters

Kira Jääskeläinen (born 1979 in Warsaw, Poland) is a Finnish-Polish documentary film director.

== Background ==
Jääskeläinen was born in Poland into a family of artists, but moved to Finland at the age of five. In the early years of the 2000s Jääskeläinen studied humanities at the University of Copenhagen, concentrating in East European Studies and the Russian language, and wrote her MA thesis on the material she collected in Chukotka. Later she studied in Moscow, in the Gerasimov Institute of Cinematography, majoring in documentary film making. Jääskeläinen has also studied classical music and plays the cello.

== Family ==
The Finnish documentarist Jarmo Jääskeläinen (1937–2022) was her father.

== Films ==
Jääskeläinen's first documentary Takigaks – Once Were Hunters was released in 2012. It tells about two brothers, Kolya and Sasha, who are Siberian Yupiks and live in the village of Novoye Chaplino in the eastern extremity of the Chukotka Peninsula. Their community has traditionally practised whale hunting, but some of the youth find themselves in the midst of an identity crisis, if, for some reason, they do not find this profession appealing. The filming of this documentary took place over five years.

The film has been shown on several film festivals and on the Finnish public YLE TV1 channel in 2014.

Jääskeläinen is working on a film on a one-hundred-year-old cello, which was found on a dumpster in Copenhagen, and another documentary film on Chukotka.

== Filmography ==
- Takigaks – Once Were Hunters, 2012. Katharsis Films Oy.
- Northern Travelogues, 2019. Illume Oy.
