= Karmapa - a Voyage on the Roof of the World =

- Directed by: Arto Halonen
- Written by: Arto Halonen
- Cinematography: Viliam Poltikovič; Miroslav Souček; Timo Heinänen; Harri Sipilä; Jari Pollari; Jean Bitar; Arto Halonen; Juha Antti-Poika
- Music by: Vesa Mäkinen
- Production companies: Art Films production Yleisradio / TV 2 / Dokumenttiprojekti
- Release date: 1998
- Running time: 61 minutes
- Country: Finland

Karmapa - a Voyage on the Roof of the World is a 1998 documentary film directed by Arto Halonen. It is a companion film to Karmapa - Two Ways of Divinity, following the challenging and ethically demanding process of making the film in Tibet, China, Nepal, India, the United States, and Finland. The documentary was co-produced with Yle TV2's Dokumenttiprojekti.

Filming began in 1994, and the film was completed in 1998. Karmapa - a Voyage on the Roof of the World examines the dispute over the selection of the Tibetan Buddhist Karmapa lama, as well as political pressure from China that also affects the filmmakers. The production faced significant challenges because of the religious and political sensitivity of its subject. Obtaining permission from the Chinese government to film the Karmapa living in Tibet proved particularly difficult. To secure permission, Halonen avoided telling Chinese authorities about material that had already been filmed in India showing the other Karmapa and the Dalai Lama.

Permission was finally granted in 1997, and filming in Tibet took place under the supervision of Chinese authorities.

Halonen has described the making of the Karmapa films as a difficult process that also involved his own personal growth. He said that he was forced to reflect on questions such as what was important to him, how he viewed the values of the world, and where he should direct his energy in his work. He described it as a success that he was able to “balance on difficult terrain” and address important issues “both politically and spiritually.”

Karmapa - a Voyage on the Roof of the World received an honorable mention from the jury at Kettupäivät in 1998. It was also selected to compete at Tampere Film Festival in 1999.

After the film was completed, China denied Halonen a visa for the 2008 Beijing Olympics, even though he had been invited by Veikkaus and the Finnish Olympic Committee. The visa denial evoked widespread discussion both in Finland and internationally. According to Halonen, the denial was connected to his Karmapa films, which had provoked strong criticism and anger in China following their release.
