= Copenhagen hypnosis murders =

1951 murders in Denmark

The Copenhagen hypnosis murders were a double-murder case in connection with a failed bank robbery that happened in Denmark on 29 March 1951. After extensive police, psychiatric and psychological investigations and the ensuing trial proceedings, two people were convicted of the murders: Palle Hardrup and Bjørn Schouw Nielsen. It was the view of the trial court, in a decision that the Danish Supreme Court affirmed, that Schouw Nielsen had hypnotized the 28-year-old Hardrup to carry out the robbery and the murders.

Both men served prison terms and were released in 1967.

== Robbery ==
When Hardrup committed the robbery, he shot one of the bank's cashiers and then the branch manager. Hardrup then fled by bicycle to a nearby street and entered a building. Several eyewitnesses went in after him, and the police were directed to a stairwell where Hardrup had tried to hide. Hardrup quickly surrendered to the police without resistance.

== The investigation ==
The bicycle used by Hardrup in his escape belonged to Bjørn Schouw Nielsen. A few days after the incident, Nielsen himself contacted the police and claimed he wanted to make sure he was not a robbery suspect just because Hardrup had used his bicycle.

Bjørn Schouw Nielsen and Palle Hardrup had previously shared the same cell at Horsens State Prison, where they had served sentences for treason after World War II. During their time in prison, both men showed great interest in Asian philosophy, yoga, and hypnosis.

After the robbery, the police department began to suspect that Nielsen might have used hypnosis to manipulate Hardrup to commit the bank robbery and the related murders. The theory was corroborated by forty witness statements from prisoners and guards at Horsens State Prison: these statements suggested that Hardrup was already under Nielsen's mental control in prison. The guards and prisoners reported that Nielsen manipulated Hardrup like a puppet and that he could make Hardrup behave as if he were in a trance. Hardrup had also told several fellow inmates that Nielsen hypnotized him regularly.

Forensic investigator Roland Olsen led the investigation. Olsen was assisted by Max Schmidt, the chief psychiatrist at the police department, and by Dr. Paul Reiter. Using suggestion and hypnosis, Max Schmidt and Paul Rieter explored Palle Hardrup's mental states and his susceptibility to hypnosis. Paul Reiter had been researching the use of hypnosis for criminal activity for years and believed that it was possible to hypnotize another person to commit crimes. Rieter conducted extensive interviews and had several discussions with the Hardrup family and Hardrup's closest relatives. The interviews served as evidence for Rieter’s conclusions about Hardrup’s mental state. At the trial, it was Reiter who specifically spoke of the fact that a person can be hypnotized to do something the person would not normally do as long as the act is, in that person's view, morally justified. According to Reiter’s theory, Nielsen had already started manipulating Hardrup mentally and emotionally in prison, so in the end, Hardrup came to feel that committing murder was not only an acceptable but even an inevitable act. This level of manipulation was made possible and reinforced by Nielsen’s often repeated hypnotic suggestions. Reiter has authored numerous publications on the subject, including Antisocial or criminal acts and hypnosis: a case study.

After an extensive set of legal proceedings that eventually ended in 1955, Palle Hardrup was sentenced to be imprisoned indefinitely at the Institution of Herstedvester. The Danish Supreme Court upheld Bjørn Schouw Nielsen's sentence to life imprisonment and declined to reopen the case. At the time of the Supreme Court's decision, the Danish Medico-Legal Council had stated that they were unable either to confirm or dispute Reiter's theory. However, in December 1956, after a thorough examination of the case file, the Council issued its final public statement on the case, finding that there had been a significant mental disorder in Hardrup's state of mind - the influence of another person, which in these circumstances involved hypnosis. A few years later, the subcommittee of the Strasbourg Court of Human Rights reopened the case for special consideration. In 1960, the subcommittee found that the Danish judiciary had properly convicted Nielsen. This decision was further upheld by the Human Rights Court in 1961.

Both Nielsen and Hardrup were released independently in 1967. Bjørn Schouw Nielsen committed suicide with potassium cyanide in 1974. Palle Hardrup died in 2012.

== Film adaptation ==
A movie based on the hypnosis murders case, Murderous Trance (The Guardian Angel), premiered in 2018. The movie was an international co-production, shot in Denmark and Croatia, and stars Pilou Asbæk, Josh Lucas, Rade Šerbedžija, Cyron Melville and Sara Soulié. The movie's director, writer and co-producer Arto Halonen first met Palle Hardrup in 1997 and was one of the few people to interview him.
