= Confrontations in Cuba =

- Directed by: Arto Halonen
- Written by: Arto Halonen
- Produced by: Arto Halonen
- Cinematography: Arto Halonen; Alberto Moreno
- Edited by: Hanna Aartolahti
- Music by: Martti Turunen
- Production company: Art Films Production AFP Oy
- Distributed by: Art Films Production AFP Oy; Suomen Elokuvakontakti ry
- Release date: 2007
- Running time: 18 minutes
- Language: Spanish

Confrontations in Cuba (Finnish: Kohtaamisia Kuubassa) is a 2007 Finnish experimental short documentary film written and directed by Arto Halonen. It is the fourth and final installment in Halonen’s series of documentary films shot in Cuba. The other films in the series are The Tank Man (2004), Conquistadors of Cuba (2005), and The Legend (2005).

The film portrays everyday moments in Cuba, Havana as people await the climax of the baseball season and Hurricane Wilma. The film consists of separate stories, each filmed in one single take.

The film was screened, among other festivals, in the national short film competition at Tampere Film Festival and in the documentary competition at the Magma Short Film Festival in Italy.
