= The Legend (2005 film) =

2005 Finnish documentary film

- Finnish: Legenda
- Directed by: Arto Halonen
- Written by: Arto Halonen; Timo Peltola
- Produced by: Arto Halonen
- Cinematography: Arto Halonen
- Edited by: Timo Peltola
- Music by: Timo Peltola
- Release date: 2005
- Country: Finland
- Languages: Finnish; Spanish

The Legend (Finnish: Legenda) is a 2005 Finnish short documentary directed by Arto Halonen. The film was written by Halonen and Timo Peltola. It is part of Halonen's series of documentary films shot in Cuba. The other films in the series are The Tank Man (2004), Conquistadors of Cuba (2005), and Confrontations in Cuba (2007).

The film tells the story of Jorge Jorge, a Cuban revolutionary hero whose colorful life story reflects the larger legend of Cuba, shaped by both fact and fiction.

Jorge worked as a waiter at Havana's legendary Hotel Nacional until his life changed when mafia boss Meyer Lansky left a large sum of money in his bank account. Jorge handed over part of the money to Fidel Castro, and as a result, he was appointed manager of the hotel as a reward for his work in support of the Cuban Revolution.

The film had its international premiere at the Havana International Film Festival, after which it was screened at numerous film festivals, including the Documentary Madrid festival in Spain.
