= Something in the Blood =

1994 Finnish documentary film

- Finnish: Veren perintö
- Directed by: Arto Halonen
- Written by: Arto Halonen
- Produced by: Arto Halonen
- Cinematography: Timo Heinänen
- Edited by: Arto Halonen
- Music by: Petri Karttunen
- Production company: Art Films Production AFP
- Release date: 1994 (Finland)
- Running time: 28 minutes
- Country: Finland
- Languages: Finnish; Russian

Something in the Blood (Finnish: Veren perintö) is a 1994 Finnish documentary film directed by Arto Halonen. The film tells a story of a Russian journalist, Vyacheslav Oparin, who believes that he has a connection to Yetis. The film was shot during winter and summer of 1993 in Russia's Republic of Karelia and in the area of Paanajärvi National Park. Something in the Blood was part of Yleisradio's TV2 channel's Dokumenttiprojekti program.

The film was selected for the Tampere Film Festival and was also screened at the Pärnu International Anthropological Film Festival and the Thessaloniki International Documentary Film Festival. In the documentary, Halonen remains impartial and does not take a stand on the truthfulness of Oparin's claims. Halonen told the Tampere Film Festival's magazine: "The topic presented itself to me as a symbol of many things. Whether the man is crazy or a fraud, or whether the whole story is true, is not essential."

== People featured in the film ==
=== Vyacheslav Oparin ===
Vyacheslav Oparin was a well-known and respected journalist in Karelia and editor-in-chief of the local Novaya Zhizn (New Life) newspaper. His relationship with the Yeti was mystical and deeply personal.

=== Maija Bykova ===
The film also features Russian cryptozoologist and hominologist Maija Bykova (1930–1996), who devoted her career to researching the Yeti. Bykova based her work on the research of Boris Porhnev, a historian and sociologist at the Academy of Sciences of the Soviet Union, and Dmitry Bayanov, head of the hominological research center at the Moscow State Darwin Museum. She put their theoretical foundation into practice and became known for years of field research, including expeditions into the wilderness of Siberia.

Bykova conducted field research for 15 years before having her first personal Yeti sighting. At the time of the film's production in 1993, she said that she had encountered a Yeti twice in nature. Bykova died of a brain tumor in the United States in February 1996, and part of the extensive research archive she had collected was lost after her death.
