= Aaro Iivari Aukusti, Farmer's Son =

- Directed by: Arto Halonen
- Produced by: Arto Halonen
- Cinematography: Arto Halonen
- Edited by: Arto Halonen
- Music by: Kari Mikkonen
- Production company: Art Films Production AFP
- Release date: 1989
- Running time: 50 minutes
- Country: Finland
- Language: Finnish

Aaro Iivari Aukusti, the Farmer’s Son is a documentary film directed by Arto Halonen, which was completed in 1989. The film is a portrait of Aaro Heikkilä, the mayor of Joensuu at the time, whose outspoken manner and actions divided public opinion. The film was shot during a period when Heikkilä was suspected of an offence committed in public office.

Aaro Iivari Aukusti, the Farmer’s Son is the first feature-length documentary film of Halonen’s career.

== Credits ==
- Directed by: Arto Halonen
- Produced by: Arto Halonen
- Music by: Kari Mikkonen
- Cinematography by: Arto Halonen
- Edited by: Arto Halonen
- Sound by: Teemu Laitinen, Jukka Silvennoinen
- Lighting by: Teemu Laitinen, Jukka Silvennoinen
