= Tourist (1990 film) =

1990 Finnish animated short film

- Finnish: Turisti
- Directed by: Arto Halonen
- Written by: Arto Halonen; Teppo Laurinolli
- Produced by: Arto Halonen
- Cinematography: Arto Halonen
- Edited by: Arto Halonen
- Music by: Petri Karttunen
- Animation by: Teppo Laurinolli
- Production company: Art Films Production AFP
- Release date: 1990
- Running time: 15 minutes
- Country: Finland
- Language: Finnish

Tourist (Finnish: Turisti) is a 1990 Finnish clay animation film by Arto Halonen and Teppo Laurinolli. The film explores the exploitation of nature and its devastating effects on life, as Mother Nature struggles to defend her existence.

The main character is a human-like creature that is born into the natural world and discovers its ability to exploit its surroundings.

The film received production funding from the Finnish Film Foundation and was also financed by Yle TV2. Tourist was also selected for the National Competition at the Tampere Film Festival.

== The Long Trip (1990) ==
The Long Trip
- Finnish: Pitkä matka eli tositapahtumiin perustuva kertomus erään elokuvan synnystä
- Directed by: Arto Halonen
- Written by: Arto Halonen
- Produced by: Arto Halonen
- Cinematography: Arto Halonen (Note: Under the pseudonym Pertti Pitkänen.); Teemu Laitinen; Markku Pölönen; Teppo Laurinolli
- Music by: Petri Karttunen; Kari Mikkonen
- Distributed by: Art Films Production AFP
- Release date: 1990
- Running time: 31 minutes
- Country: Finland
- Language: Finnish

During the production of Tourist, Halonen also made a documentary following the animation's creation process, The Long Trip (1990, Finnish: Pitkä matka eli tositapahtumiin perustuva kertomus erään elokuvan synnystä), which was broadcast on Yle. The running time of the document is 31 minutes, and it premiered on Yle in 1990.
