= Pekka Streng =

Finnish musician (1948–1975)

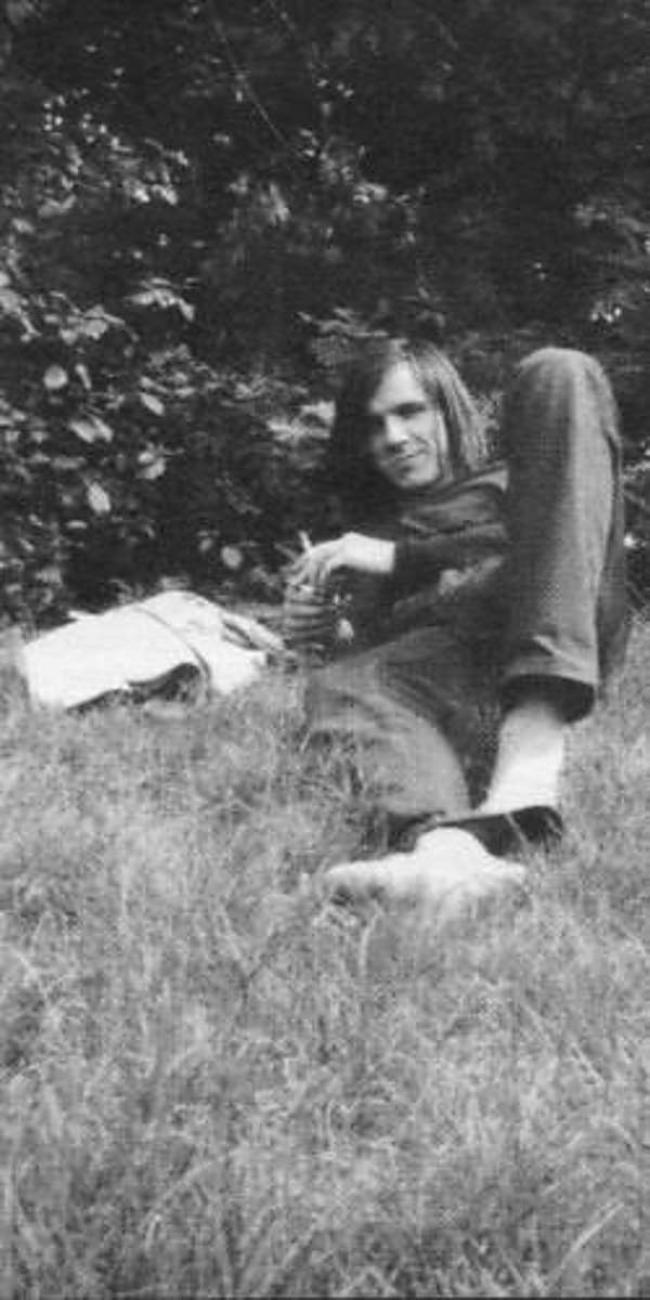
Pekka Streng

Pekka Valter Mattias Streng (April 26, 1948 – April 11, 1975) was a Finnish musician who had a notable influence on progressive rock in Finland.

Streng was born in Sysmä, and died of cancer at the age of 26. He knew about his disease throughout his career and the awareness of his forthcoming death can be heard from both his lyrics and music. During his short career he made two albums, which were published by Love Records. He wrote the songs and lyrics (in Finnish), and performed vocals and acoustic guitars on the albums. On the first one, Magneettimiehen kuolema (1970), he collaborated with Tasavallan Presidentti, a renowned Finnish prog band of the time. On Kesämaa (1972), various other noted musicians such as Olli Ahvenlahti and Hasse Walli took part in the studio sessions.

At the time of publication, Streng's records did not prove especially popular. Later, however, his music began gradually to attract more and more following. The two albums were first released on (one) CD in 1990. Due to demand, remastered CD editions of both albums (this time separately) were released in 2003.

Pekka Streng avoided publicity and gave only one interview to a music journalist that was published posthumously. Because of this, not much has been known about him as a person, which occasionally has helped to form a somewhat mystified image of him. His life and personality were explored in more detail in the 2009 documentary movie Magneettimies by Arto Halonen, which included interviews with Streng's family and associates.

In 2009, nearly 34 years after Pekka Streng's death was released a posthumous album called Unen Maa which was built upon old recovered tape recordings where Pekka sings and plays acoustic guitar. Studio musicians (Olympia-orkesteri) provided overdubs for the recordings.

== Discography ==
- Magneettimiehen Kuolema (with Tasavallan Presidentti) (1970)
- Kesämaa (1972)
- Unen maa (posthumous album with Olympia-orkesteri) (2009)
