= Ringside (1992 film) =

- Directed by: Arto Halonen
- Written by: Arto Halonen
- Produced by: Arto Halonen
- Cinematography: Timo Heinänen (fiction); Arto Halonen (documentary)
- Edited by: Arto Halonen
- Music by: Petri Karttunen
- Production company: Art Films production
- Release date: 1992
- Running time: 57 minutes
- Country: Finland
- Language: Finnish

Ringside is a 1992 Finnish dramatized documentary film directed by Arto Halonen. The film tells the story of boxer Tarmo Uusivirta, who makes a comeback as a professional boxer and prepares for the most important match of his career while falling in love and challenging his view of the world. Halonen followed Uusivirta's return to the ring from autumn of 1990 onwards.

In the film's fictional sequences, Uusivirta as a child is played by Mikko Saarikko.

Ringside received production support from the Finnish Film Foundation, but initially had no television broadcaster. The completed film was eventually acquired by Yle's Dokumenttiprojekti program, whose founder Jarmo Jääskeläinen purchased it for broadcast.

Ringside gained international recognition by winning the Golden Shot Award for Best Sports Film, awarded by the European Broadcasting Union (EBU) in Portorož, Slovenia. It also received the Finnish State Quality Production Award. The film represented Yleisradio at the Banff Festival. The Arts Council of North Karelia awarded Halonen the Ensiesitys Award for his breakthrough with Ringside. Critic Jukka Kajava wrote in Helsingin Sanomat about the film's unusually honest portrayal of an athlete and its ability to speak to young people.

Uusivirta died in 1999. Following his death, Helsingin Sanomat published an article about Uusivirta's career and life that was partly based on the Ringside documentary.

The film's 2005 DVD release included additional material featuring not only the filmmakers but also Uusivirta's coaches Yrjö Sikiö and Aarno Luoma, as well as Simo Rantalainen, his manager during the final part of his professional career. The DVD was released together with Halonen's other documentary, Valo varjon takaa, about hurdler Arto Bryggare.

== Credits ==
- Director: Arto Halonen
- Writer: Arto Halonen
- Cinematography: Timo Heinänen (fiction), Arto Halonen (documentary)
- Editing: Arto Halonen
- Sound: Leo Mäenluoma, Jari Ovaska
- Music: Petri Karttunen
- Producer: Arto Halonen
