= Krista Kosonen =

Finnish actress (born 1983)

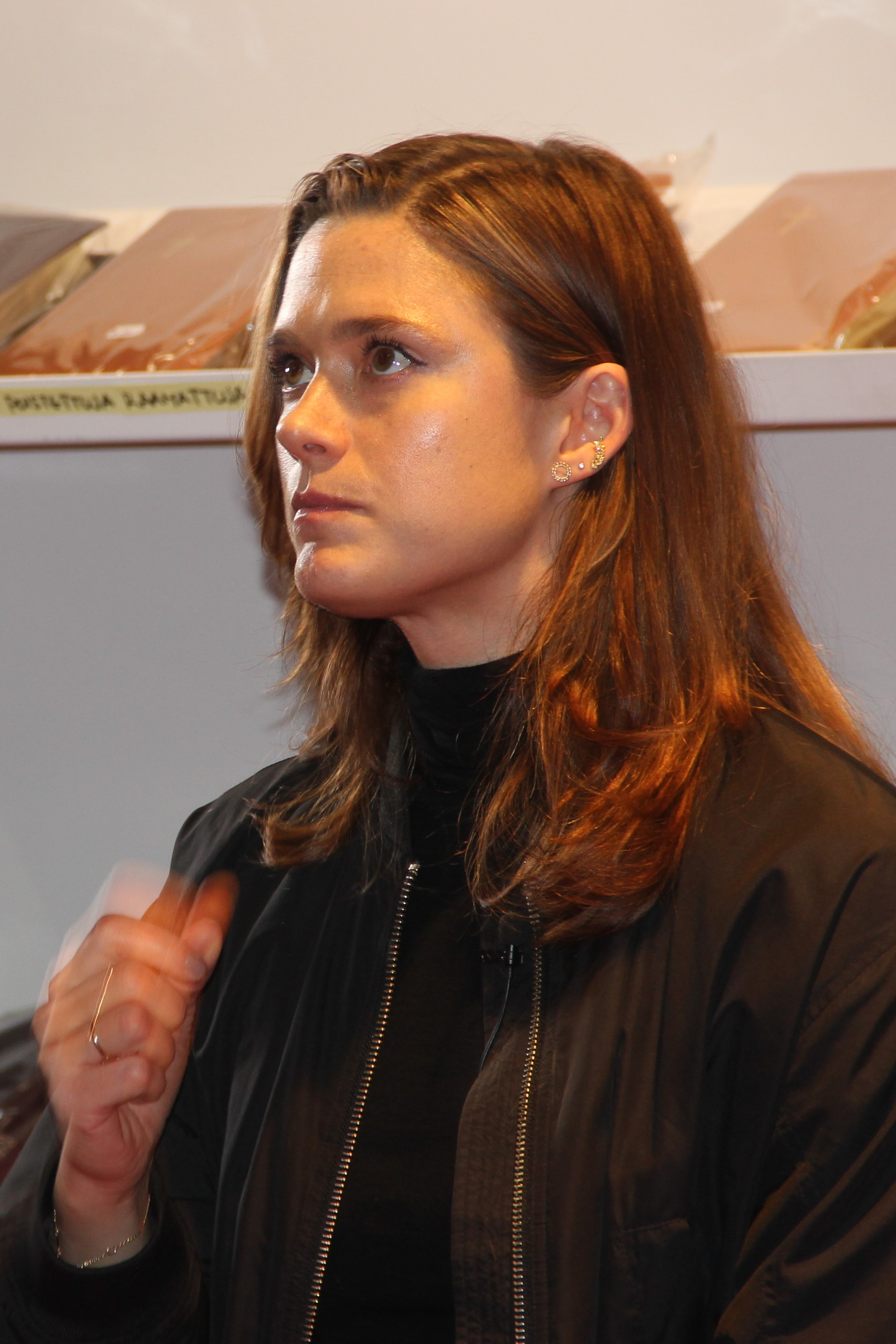
- Kosonen in 2021
- Born: Krista Erika Kosonen; 28 May 1983 (age 43); Espoo, Finland
- Occupation: Actress
- Years active: 2006–present
- Spouse: Antti Jokinen (m. 2018)
- Children: 2
- Awards: Shanghai International Film Festival; Jussi Awards

Krista Erika Kosonen (born 28 May 1983) is a Finnish actress known for her roles in films such as Jade Warrior (2006), Princess (2010), and The Midwife (2015), for which she won the Golden Goblet Award for Best Actress. She has also appeared in the sketch comedy series Putous and the HBO series Beforeigners, and is a two-time recipient of the Jussi Award for Best Actress.

== Career ==
Krista Kosonen has acted in such films as Jade Warrior (2006) and Princess (2010) and the Norwegian HBO series Beforeigners (2019, 2021). She has also appeared in the sketch comedy television show Putous (2010–2014). She received the Best Actress award at the Shanghai International Film Festival for her performance in The Midwife (2015). She has also won two Jussi Award for Best Actress: in 2016 for The Midwife and in 2018 for Miami.

== Personal life ==
Kosonen was born on 28 May 1983. She is married to the movie director Antti J. Jokinen. They have two children together, a daughter (born 2015) and a son (born 2022).

== Selected filmography ==
=== Film ===
List of film appearances, with year, title, and role shown
Year	Title	Role	Notes
2006	Jade Warrior	Ronja	
2007	The Year of the Wolf	Sari Karaslahti	
2010	Princess	Christina Von Heyroth	
2011	Risto	Anna Kaskilahti	
2011	Body of Water	Julia	
2012	Purge	Ingel	
2012	Road North	Elina	
2014	Big Significant Things	Ella	
2015	The Midwife	Helena Alatalo	
2017	Blade Runner 2049	Doxie #2	
2017	Miami	Angela	
2019	Dogs Don't Wear Pants	Mona	
2020	Tove	Vivica Bandler	
2021	Omerta 6/12		
2026	Backrooms	Nora Kline	
2026	Red Snow		

=== Television ===
List of television appearances, with year, title, and role shown
Year	Title	Role	Notes
2010	Underworld Trilogy	Satu Haapala	5 episodes
2010–14	Putous	Various characters	42 episodes
2018	Bullets	Mari Kristina Saari	10 episodes
2019–2021	Beforeigners	Alfhildr Enginsdottir	12 episodes
2021	Mister 8	Maria	8 episodes
2023	The Swarm	Tina Lund	8 episodes
2024	Ronja, the Robber's Daughter	Lovis, Ronja's mother	12 episodes
2025	Foundation	Fallon Greer	5 episodes
2026	Land of Sin	Dani Anttila	5 episodes
