= Tarmo Uusivirta =

Finnish boxer

Personal information
- Nickname: Tare
- Nationality: Finnish
- Born: Tarmo Tapani Uusivirta; 5 February 1957 Jyväskylä, Finland
- Died: 13 December 1999 (aged 42) Jyväskylä, Finland
- Height: 1.81 m (5 ft 11 in)
- Weight: Super-middleweight

Boxing career
- Stance: Orthodox

Boxing record
- Total fights: 31
- Wins: 24
- Win by KO: 16
- Losses: 4
- Draws: 3
Medal record
Men's amateur boxing
Representing Finland
European Amateur Championships
Gold medal – first place	1979 Cologne	Middleweight
World Championships
Silver medal – second place	1978 Belgrade	Middleweight
Silver medal – second place	1982 Munich	Middleweight

Tarmo "Tare" Tapani Uusivirta (5 February 1957 – 13 December 1999) was a Finnish professional boxer who competed from 1982 to 1992, and challenged once for the European super-middleweight title in 1991. As an amateur he won a gold medal at the 1979 European Championships, and consecutive silver medals at the 1978 and 1982 World Championships; all in the middleweight division.

== Amateur career ==
Besides the European title, Uusivirta won silver medals at the world championships in 1978 and 1982. He competed at the 1980 Olympics and lost in the second round to the eventual bronze medalist Jerzy Rybicki.

== Professional career ==
In 1982 Uusivirta turned professional. In 1986, he had a draw with the then reigning European Champion Alex Blanchard in a non-title match. In 1987, he won against the future European champion James Cook (boxer). In 1988 he had a second draw with Blanchard, contending the IBF European super-middleweight title. In 1992, shortly before the European super-middleweight title fight against James Cook (boxer), Uusivirta suffered an injury and had to give up a close bout in the 7th round. He retired the same year with a record of 24 wins (16 knockouts), 4 losses, and 3 draws.

== Retirement and death ==
After retiring Uusivirta grew bitter and regretted his move from amateur to professional boxing. He eventually lost his job as a fireman due to alcoholism, and committed suicide at the age of 42 in 1999.

== Film, book and theater ==
Arto Halonen directed a dramatized documentary Ringside (1992) that tells a story of Uusivirta's return to the boxing ring.

Simo Rantalainen wrote a book about the boxer, Tare: Mestarinyrkkeilijän muotokuva, which was published in February 2017.

A biographical play, Mestari, written and directed by Pasi Lampela, premiered at Jyväskylä City Theatre on January 22, 2025.

== Professional boxing record ==
31 fights	24 wins	4 losses
By knockout	16	2
By decision	8	2
Draws	3	

No.	Result	Record	Opponent	Type	Round, time	Date	Location	Notes
31	Win	24–4–3	Shannon Landberg	UD	8	5 Apr 1992	Seinäjoki, Finland	
30	Loss	23–4–3	James Cook	RTD	7 (12), 0:58	22 Oct 1991	Latchmere Leisure Centre, London, England	For European super-middleweight title
29	Win	23–3–3	Ron Lee Warrior	KO	1	17 Jun 1991	Helsinki, Finland	
28	Win	22–3–3	Kenny Schaefer	TKO	7 (10)	25 Mar 1991	Helsinki, Finland	
27	Win	21–3–3	Jimmy Shavers	KO	5, 1:10	3 Dec 1990	Helsinki, Finland	
26	Win	20–3–3	Irving Hines	TKO	4 (10), 2:28	5 Nov 1990	Helsinki, Finland	
25	Win	19–3–3	Troy Watson	UD	8	1 Oct 1990	Helsinki, Finland	
24	Win	18–3–3	William Clayton	KO	1 (8), 2:59	20 Aug 1990	Helsinki, Finland	
23	Draw	17–3–3	Alex Blanchard	SD	12	12 Dec 1988	Ice Hall, Helsinki, Finland	For vacant IBF European super-middleweight title
22	Win	17–3–2	Gonzalo Mencho	KO	4 (8)	11 Sep 1988	UKK Halli, Laukaa, Finland	
21	Win	16–3–2	Harry Cowap	RTD	3 (10), 3:00	15 May 1988	Ice Stadium, Tampere, Finland	
20	Win	15–3–2	Tony Burke	RTD	8 (10), 3:00	7 Feb 1988	UKK Halli, Laukaa, Finland	
19	Win	14–3–2	Mbuyanba Kalombo	PTS	6	15 Jan 1988	Skive Hallerne, Skive, Denmark	
18	Win	13–3–2	James Cook	UD	10	26 Oct 1987	Jyväskylä, Finland	
17	Draw	12–3–2	Enrico Scacchia	PTS	10	26 Dec 1986	Bern, Switzerland	
16	Win	12–3–1	Joe Cooper	TKO	2 (6)	21 Nov 1986	Tre Falke Scenen, Copenhagen, Denmark	
15	Win	11–3–1	Jimmy Cable	PTS	10	9 Nov 1986	Vaasa, Finland	
14	Draw	10–3–1	Alex Blanchard	PTS	10	26 Mar 1986	Jaap Edenhal, Amsterdam, Netherlands	
13	Win	10–3	Philippe Seys	KO	2	24 Nov 1985	Vaasa, Finland	
12	Win	9–3	Paul Tchoue	PTS	8	11 May 1985	Vaasa, Finland	
11	Win	8–3	Willie Wright	PTS	8	9 Mar 1985	K.B. Hallen, Copenhagen, Denmark	
10	Win	7–3	Esperno Postl	TKO	3	27 Oct 1984	Mariehamn, Finland	
9	Loss	6–3	Jose Seys	TKO	5	21 May 1984	Urheilutalo, Helsinki, Finland	
8	Loss	6–2	Anthony Holt	MD	8	11 May 1984	Felt Forum, New York City, New York, US	
7	Win	6–1	Juan Munoz Holgado	KO	3 (6)	18 Feb 1984	Idrætshuset, Copenhagen, Denmark	
6	Win	5–1	Martin McEwan	KO	2	17 Dec 1983	Hotel Arkipelag, Mariehamn, Finland	
5	Loss	4–1	Dick Katende	PTS	8	5 Nov 1983	Mannheim, West Germany	
4	Win	4–0	Maurice Bufi	TKO	5	18 Sep 1983	Jyväskylä, Finland	
3	Win	3–0	Andre Mongelema	RTD	5, 3:00	9 Apr 1983	Blendecques, France	
2	Win	2–0	Deano Wallace	KO	2	1 Oct 1982	Helsinki, Finland	
1	Win	1–0	Mick Morris	PTS	6	25 Jun 1982	Hanko, Finland	Professional debut
