= Jarmo Jääskeläinen =

Finnish journalist (1937–2022)

- Born: 2 August 1937; Viipuri, Finland
- Died: 2 January 2022 (aged 84); Helsinki, Finland
- Occupation: Documentarist
- Years active: 1967–2005
- Notable work: Ylioppilaan kuolema ('The death of a student') and Messu isänmaan puolesta ('A mass for fatherland')

Jarmo Jääskeläinen (2 August 1937 – 2 January 2022) was a Finnish journalist, producer and director of documentary films. He was known especially for his documentaries on Poland.

== Career ==
Jääskeläinen started his career in London, broadcasting for the Finnish service in the BBC World Service. From there he moved to Poland, where he studied in the Łódź Film School from 1965 on. From 1967 on he worked as the Polish correspondent for the Finnish Broadcasting Corporation YLE. When he returned to Finland, he worked as a producer and director of documentary films. At YLE, he founded the programme Dokumenttiprojekti, the slot for documentary films, and he was its head from 1990 to 1997.

Jääskeläinen included in Dokumenttiprojekti not only works of Finnish documentarists, but also those of foreign directors. YLE thus gained a strong reputation as a place to show documentaries. The centerpieces of Jääskeläinen's works are critical documentaries on Poland, such as Ylioppilaan kuolema ('The death of a student') and Messu isänmaan puolesta ('A mass for fatherland').

== Personal life and death ==
Jääskeläinen was born in Viipuri on 2 August 1937. He married Elzbieta Jääskeläinen, a Pole. Documentarist Kira Jääskeläinen is his daughter. He died in Helsinki on 2 January 2022, at the age of 84.

== Honors ==
Jääskeläinen was awarded the State prize for dissemination of information in 1979, and DocPoint gave him their first Apollo Award in 1979. He was also awarded the Golden Venla Prize for his life work in 2011, and he was given the title of professor in 1998. He also received awards from Poland.

== Documentaries directed by Jääskeläinen ==
- Siellä missä satakieli lauloi 1–2. ('Where the nightingale sang 1–2.') 1975.
- Antonius-maastamuuttaja ('Antonius the Emigrant.') 1976.
- Ylioppilaan kuolema ('The death of a student'). (A documentary about the Polish student Stanisław Pyjas, who was murdered on 7 May 1977 in Kraków.) 1977.
- Kruunaus. ('The crowning.') 1979.
- Maailman paras paikka. ('The best place in the world.') (A documentary about the gold miner Heikki Pihlajamäki). 1979.
- Vankilan rajattu vapaus. ('The restricted freedom of the prison.') (A documentary about the state of war in Poland in the early 1980s.) 1982.
- Nälkäsairaus. ('The illness of hunger.') (A documentary about the Warsaw Ghetto in the early 1940s.) 1983.
- Aulis Sallinen nylkee ahvenen. ('Aulis Sallinen skins a perch.') 1984.
- Messu isänmaan puolesta ('A mass for the fatherland'). (A documentary about Jerzy Popiełuszko, who was murdered in October 1984.) 1985.
- Eestiläinen juhla. ('An Estonian feast.') 1985.
- Onni sinua seuratkoon – kokemuksia eräästä rakennemuutoksesta. ('May fortune follow you — experiences of a societal change.') (A documentary on the Vuosaari Wharf of Wärtsilä Marine and its last months in 1987.) 1987, 2003.
- Lastauspaikka – Umschlagsplatz. ('The loading place.') (A documentary about moving of the residents of the Warsaw ghetto to the Treblinka concentration camp in 1942.) 1987.
- Sankarit ja marttyyrit. ('Heroes and martyrs.') (A documentary about the small town of Nowy Korczyn in southern Poland and its Jews.) 1989.
- Pontikkapitäjä. ('The moonshine parish.') (A documentary on the municipality of Kitee, Finland.) 2005.

== Honours ==
- Finnish state prize for dissemination of information, 1979
- Finnish church prize for dissemination of information, 1981
- Commander's Cross, Poland
- The title of professor 1998 for his merits as a documentarist
- Apollo Prize, 2006
- Golden Venla, 2011
