= Juha Hurme =

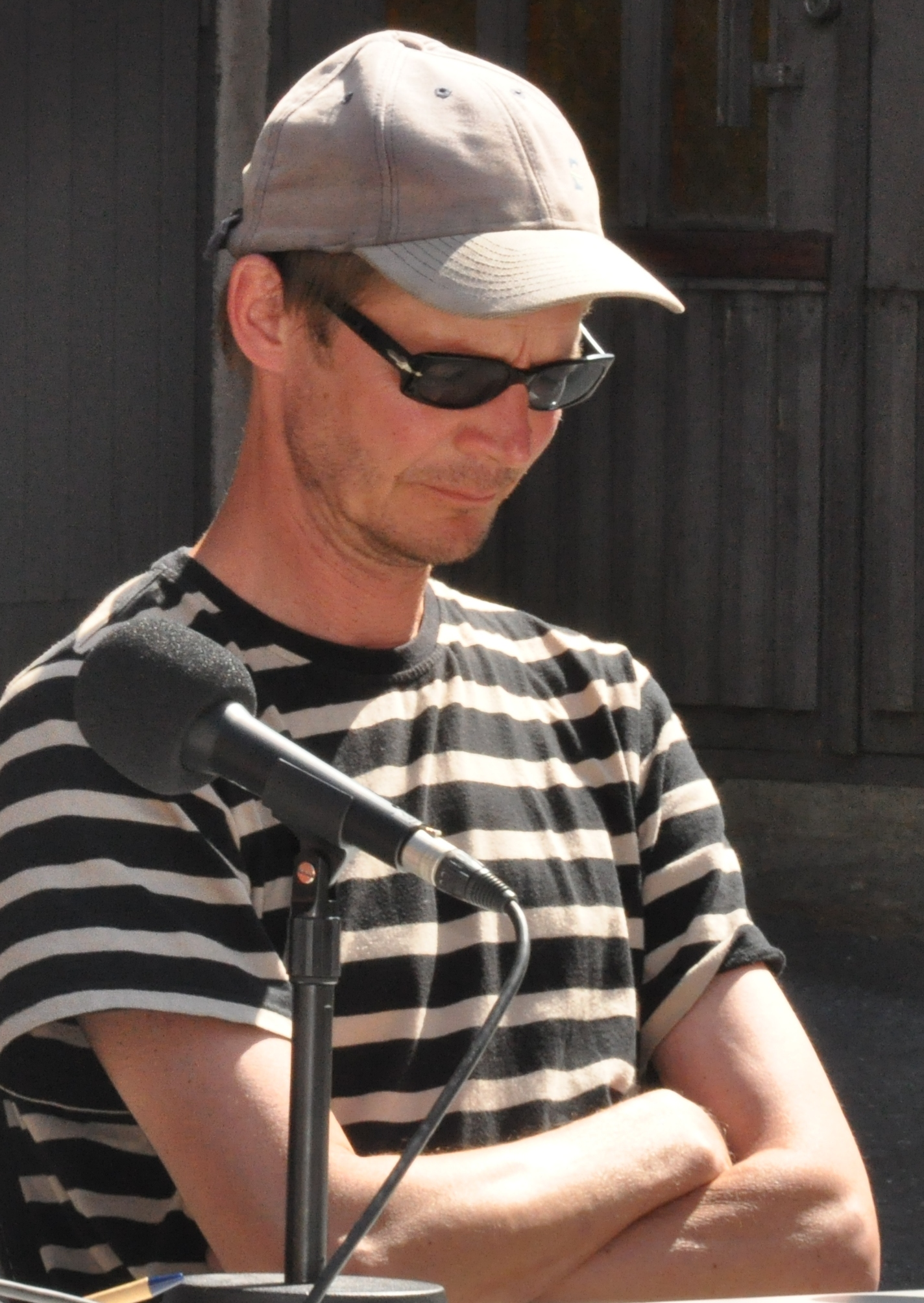

Juha Hurme (born 29 June 1959 in Paimio) is a Finnish director, playwright and writer. In 2006 Hurme received the Eino Leino Prize and in 2017 he was awarded the Finlandia Prize, for his novel Niemi. Hurme has studied sciences and has a degree in biology.
