= Katja Küttner =

Finnish actress (born 1971)

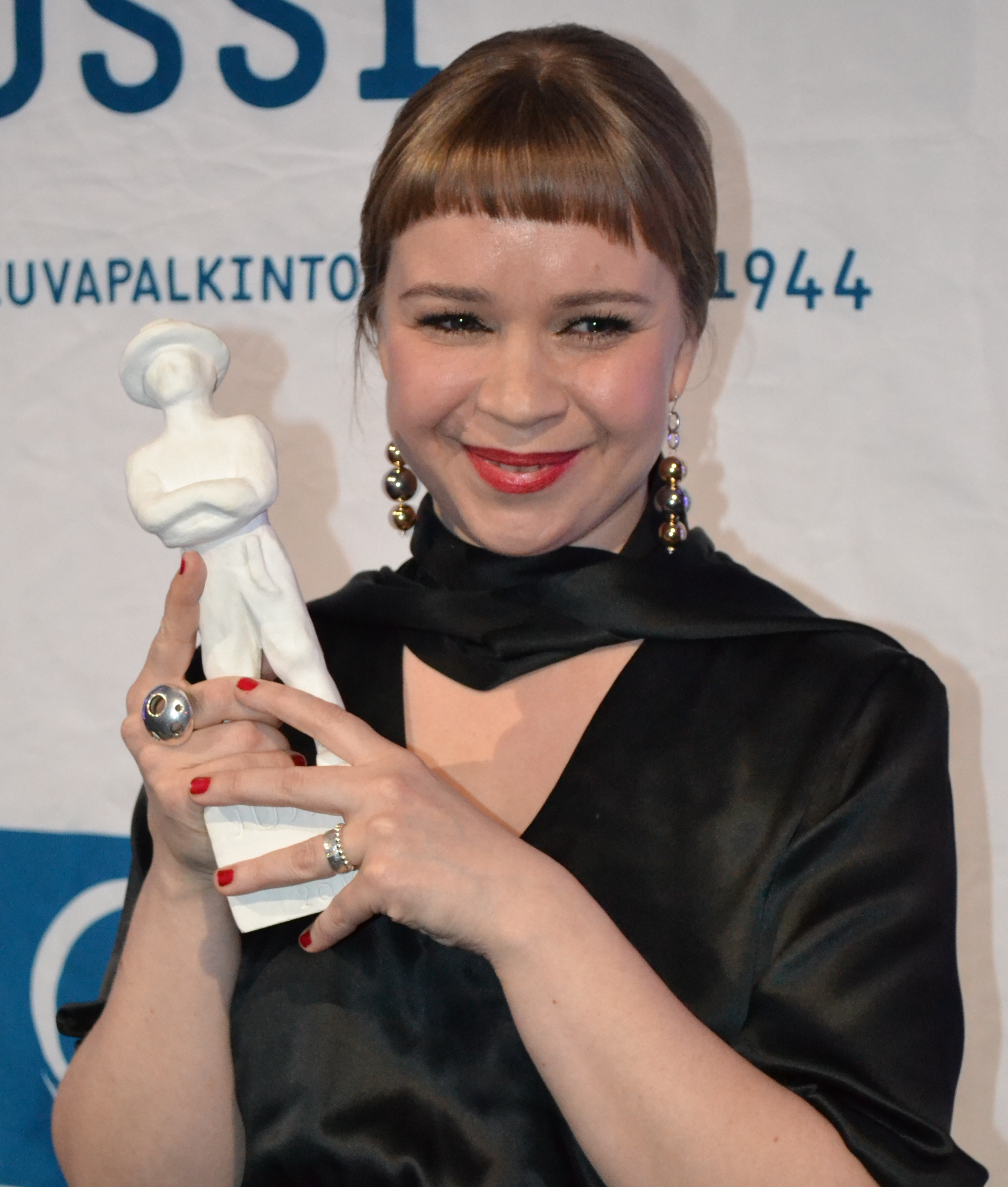
- Küttner in 2011
- Born: Katja Kukkola; 1971 (age 54–55); Oulainen, Finland
- Occupation: Actress
- Spouse: Iiro Küttner
- Children: 3
- Awards: Jussi Award for Best Actress (2010)

Katja Küttner (née Kukkola; born 1971) is a Finnish actress. She won a Jussi Award for Best Actress for Princess (2010).

== Early life and education ==
Katja Kukkola was born in 1971 in Oulainen, Finland. She attended Lahti Folk High School for one year and then studied for two years to become a kindergarten teacher. In the meantime, she applied to the Helsinki Theatre Academy. She was ultimately accepted in 1994 and graduated with a master's degree in 1998.

== Career ==
Küttner played a grieving mother in Eläville ja kuolleille (2005). She had the lead role in the 2010 film Anna Lappalainen in Princess, for which she won a Jussi Award for Best Actress.

In 2025 Küttner appeared in the TV series Queen of Fucking Everything, written and directed by Tiina Lymi for YLE and sold around the world.

== Personal life ==
Küttner and her husband, screenwriter Iiro Küttner, have three children.

== Acting credits ==
=== Film ===
Year	Title	Role	Notes	Ref.
2005	Eläville ja kuolleille			
2010	Princess	Anna Lappalainen		
2016	Tappajan näköinen mies			
2018	Stupid Young Heart			
2019	Kristal	Kristal	Short film	

=== Television ===
Year	Title	Role	Notes	Ref.
2025	Queen of Fucking Everything	Marke		

=== Theater ===
Year	Title	Role	Theater	Notes	Ref.
2018	Vuoden perhe	Laura	Takomo Theater		

== Awards and nominations ==
Year	Award	Work	Result	Ref.
2010	Jussi Award for Best Actress	Princess	Won	
