= Finnish Actors Union =

Finnish trade union

Näyttelijäliitto
- Finnish Actors Union
- Suomen Näyttelijäliitto; Finlands Skådespelarförbundet
- Founded: 1913
- Type: Trade union
- Headquarters: Helsinki
- Location: Finland
- Field: Acting
- Key people: Antti Timonen, President
- Website: www.nayttelijaliitto.fi

The Finnish Actors Union (Finnish: Suomen Näyttelijäliitto, Swedish: Finlands Skådespelarförbundet) is a trade union representing theatrical actors in Finland. Founded in 1913, the union claims to be Finland's oldest union in the theatre sector and the union to which 96% of Finland's actors belong. The union seeks to represent the interests of actors, to improve working conditions and to ensure the sector is not subordinated to market forces or prevailing political views.

In 2013, the Finnish postal service issued a set of six stamps celebrating the union's centenary, featuring Ritva Valkama, Esko Salminen, Outi Mäenpää, Martti Lemmalo, Krista Kosonen and Aku Hirviniemi. Since 2020 and the arrival of COVID-19, the union has been concerned about the reduction in working conditions in the theatre sector and the loss of work for freelancers.
