= Helsinki International Film Festival =

Coordinates: 60°10′15″N 24°56′15″E

The Helsinki International Film Festival – Love & Anarchy (Finnish: Rakkautta & Anarkiaa) is a non-competitive film festival held since 1988 in Helsinki, Finland, yearly in September.

It is the biggest film festival in Finland. In 2015 the festival attracted over 61,000 visitors. In 2024 the festival had nearly 55 000 admissions, which was the best result in any Finnish, post-pandemic film festival.

The festival was named after the 1973 Lina Wertmüller film Love and Anarchy.

The current executive director is Pauliina Ståhlberg, former producer of Deadwind TV series.
