= Tommi Korpela =

Finnish actor (born 1968)

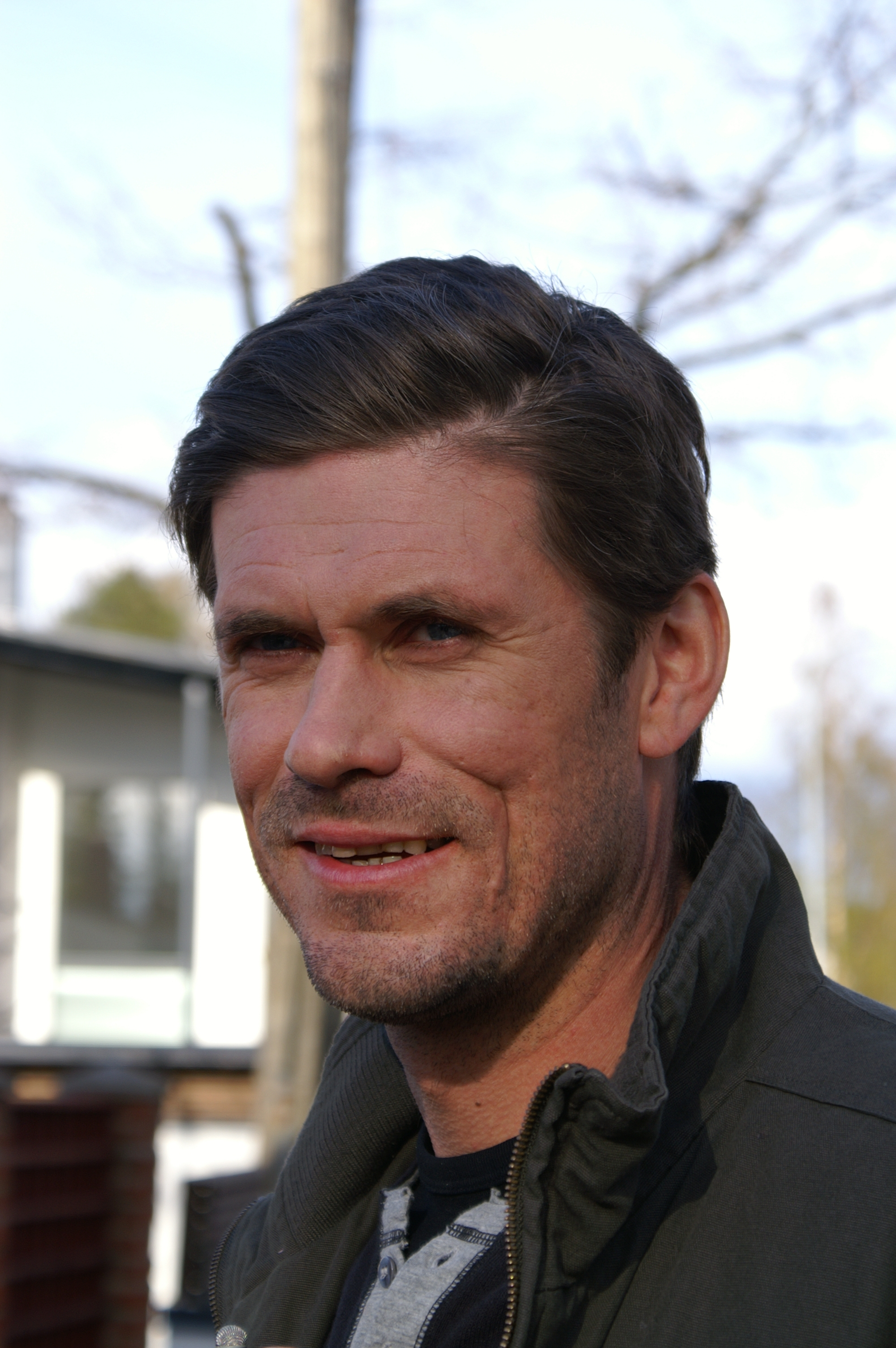
- Korpela in Espoo in 2007
- Born: Tommi Petteri Korpela; 23 August 1968 (age 57); Helsinki, Finland
- Occupation: Actor
- Years active: 1992–present

Tommi Petteri Korpela (born 23 August 1968) is a Finnish actor. He has won the Jussi Award for Best Actor three times, a feat accomplished by only two other Finnish actors before him: Lasse Pöysti and Tauno Palo. He is a member of the comedy group Julmahuvi.

== Filmography ==
Film performances
| Year | Film | Role | Director | Notes |
|---|---|---|---|---|
| 1993 | True Magic | Paavali Prinkkala | Saara Cantell | |
| 1996 | Viisasten kivi | Teppo | Sakari Kirjavainen | |
| 1997 | A Clear Winter's Day | Teuvo | Saara Cantell | |
| 1997 | Good Deeds | Bouncer | Markus Nummi | |
| 1997 | Today | | Eija-Liisa Ahtila | |
| 1997 | The Icebreaker (Jäänmurtaja) | Mutanen | Heikki Kujanpää | |
| 1997 | Kersantin kunnia | Sergeant Juntunen | Veli-Matti Saikkonen | |
| 1999 | Rikos ja rakkaus | Aarne Sirkiä | Pekka Milonoff | |
| 2001 | The Classic | Gym teacher | Kari Väänänen | |
| 2001 | On the Road to Emmaus | Kuoppala | Markku Pölönen | |
| 2002 | Haaveiden kehä | Police | Matti Ijäs | |
| 2002 | Rumble | Mäkinen | Jani Volanen | |
| 2003 | Bad Boys | Mutka | Aleksi Mäkelä | |
| 2003 | Raid | Russian criminal | Tapio Piirainen | |
| 2003 | Rare Exports Inc. | Marker | Jalmari Helander | |
| 2004 | Vares: Private Eye | Uusniitty | Aleksi Mäkelä | |
| 2005 | For the Living and the Dead | Kai | Kari Paljakka | |
| 2006 | Unna ja Nuuk | Alti | Saara Cantell | |
| 2006 | Lights in the Dusk | Lecturer | Aki Kaurismäki | |
| 2006 | The Prince of Soap | Assistant director | Janne Kuusi | |
| 2007 | V2: Dead Angel | Tom Marjola | Aleksi Mäkelä | |
| 2007 | A Man's Work | Juha Hakala | Aleksi Salmenperä | Won: Jussi Award for Best Actor |
| 2007 | Ganes | Otto Aaltonen | Jukka-Pekka Siili | |
| 2007 | The Border | Heikki Kiljunen | Lauri Törhönen | |
| 2007 | The Home of Dark Butterflies | Olavi Harjula | Dome Karukoski | |
| 2007 | The Flight Before Christmas | Leader of the herd | Michael Hegner; Kari Juusonen | |
| 2008 | Falling Angels | Lauri Viita | Heikki Kujanpää | Won: Jussi Award for Best Actor |
| 2009 | Where Is Where? | Death | Eija-Liisa Ahtila | |
| 2009 | Forbidden Fruit | Preacher | Dome Karukoski | |
| 2009 | Last Cowboy Standing | Ossi Kallio | Zaida Bergroth | |
| 2009 | Backwood Philosopher | Kronberg | Kari Väänänen | |
| 2010 | Rare Exports: A Christmas Tale | Aimo | Jalmari Helander | |
| 2010 | The Patient | The Patient | Misko Iho | |
| 2010 | Priest of Evil | Kengu | Olli Saarela | |
| 2010 | Kotirauha | Jaatinen | Aleksi Mäkelä | |
| 2012 | Purge | Martin Truu | Antti Jokinen | |
| 2014 | Santa | Jussi | Marius Ivaskevicius | Nominated: Sidabrinė gervė Award for Best Actor |
| 2015 | Wildeye | Gödel | Antti Jokinen | |
| 2015 | Häiriötekijä | Various characters | Aleksi Salmenperä | Won: Jussi Award for Best Actor |
| 2016 | Bodom | Hiker's voice | Taneli Mustonen | |
| 2016 | The Mine | | Aleksi Salmenperä | |
| 2017 | The Other Side of Hope | Melartin | Aki Kaurismäki | |
| 2017 | The Eternal Road | Jussi Ketola | Antti-Jussi Annila | |
| 2019 | Maria's Paradise | | Zaida Bergroth | |
| 2020 | The Last Ones | | Veiko Õunpuu | |
| 2021 | The Potato | | Joona Tena | |
| 2021 | Omerta 6/12 | | Aku Louhimies | |
| 2024 | 8 Views of Lake Biwa | Platon | Marko Raat | |
| 2024 | The Missile (Ohjus) | Pertti Keinänen | | |
| 2026 | Red Snow | | Ilja Rautsi | |

Television performances
| Year | Title | Role | Notes |
|---|---|---|---|
| 2018 | Bullets | Timo Viita | |
| 2019 | M/S Romantic | | |
| 2022 | A Good Family | Lefa Halme | 6 episodes |
