= Åkerblom =

Åkerblom is a Swedish-language surname.

== Geographical distribution ==
As of 2014, 84.9% of all known bearers of the surname Åkerblom were residents of Sweden (frequency 1:5,529), 13.4% of Finland (1:19,562) and 1.0% of Norway (1:244,874).

In Sweden, the frequency of the surname was higher than national average (1:5,529) in the following counties:

1. Gotland County (1:1,170)
2. Uppsala County (1:2,429)
3. Gävleborg County (1:2,569)
4. Västmanland County (1:2,702)
5. Södermanland County (1:2,909)
6. Dalarna County (1:3,292)
7. Jämtland County (1:3,563)
8. Stockholm County (1:4,315)

In Finland, the frequency of the surname was higher than national average (1:19,562) in the following regions:

1. Åland (1:950)
2. Central Ostrobothnia (1:1,911)
3. Kymenlaakso (1:9,494)
4. Ostrobothnia (1:10,224)
5. Southwest Finland (1:11,045)
6. Uusimaa (1:12,031)

== People ==
- Bengt Åkerblom (1967–1995), Swedish ice hockey player
- Maria Åkerblom (1898–1981), leader of the evangelical Åkerblom Movement
- Matti Åkerblom (1740–1819), Finnish church builder
- Viktor Åkerblom Nilsson (born 1981), Swedish actor and television presenter
