= Bad Family =

Bad Family may refer to:

- Bad Family (TV series), a South Korean TV series
- Bad Family (film), a 2010 Finnish film
