= Kauffman Amish Mennonite =

Branch of Amish Mennonites

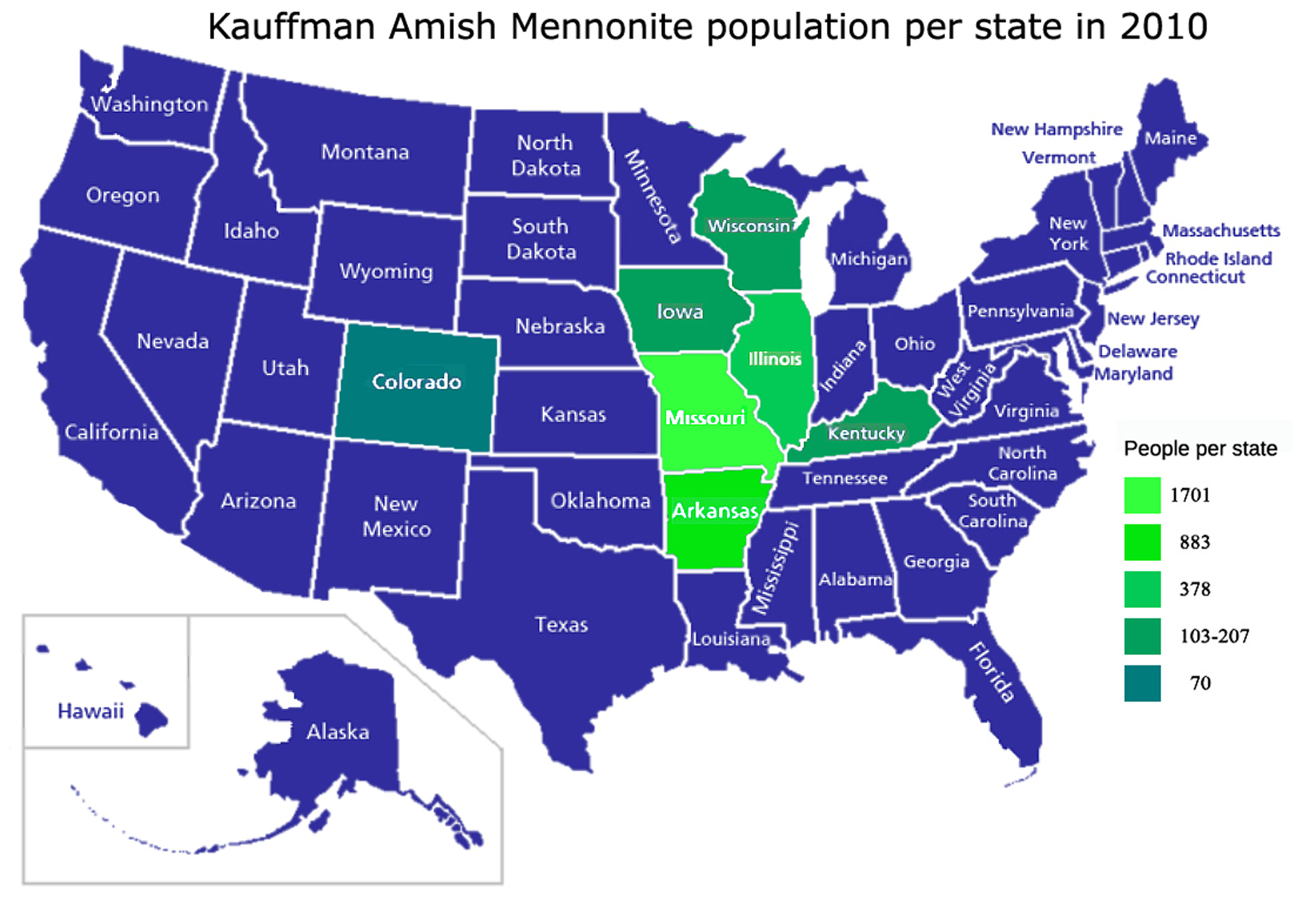
Kauffman Amish Mennonite population per US state in 2010

The Kauffman Amish Mennonites, also called Sleeping Preacher Churches or Tampico Amish Mennonite Churches, are a plain, car-driving branch of the Amish Mennonites whose tradition goes back to John D. Kauffman (1847–1913) and Noah Troyer (1831–1886) who preached while being in a state of trance and who were seen as "sleeping preachers".

In contrast to other Amish Mennonites they have retained their identity over the last hundred years and also largely the Pennsylvania German language and other Amish Mennonite traditions from the late 1800s.

They use many modern technologies, including black cars, but refuse television, radio and internet.

In 2010, there were 16 congregations of Kauffman Amish Mennonites. In 2017 they had around 2,000 baptized members and lived mainly in Missouri and Arkansas.

== History ==
=== Early history ===
For the early history of the Amish Mennonites, see Amish: History.

=== The Amish division between 1862 and 1878 ===
Mostly between 1862 and 1878 there were developments that divided the Amish into two major branches: the Old Order Amish and the Amish Mennonites. The Old Order faction rejected change and wanted to cling to the old teachings, whereas the Amish Mennonites embraced change.

During that time Dienerversammlungen (ministerial conferences) were held in Wayne County, Ohio, and other places, concerning how the Amish should deal with the pressures of modern society. The meetings themselves were a progressive idea, for bishops to assemble to discuss uniformity was an unprecedented notion in the Amish church. By the first several meetings, the more traditionally minded bishops agreed to boycott the conferences and then formed their congregations to become the Old Order Amish. The more progressive branch, comprising approximately two-thirds of all Amish, drifted toward the Mennonite mainstream over the next decades. They first retained the name Amish Mennonite but eventually dropped the word Amish from their congregations and later united with the Mennonite Church and other Mennonite denominations, especially in the early 20th century. The Tampico Amish Mennonites are the only Amish Mennonites from the division between 1862 and 1878 who have retained their Amish Mennonite identity until now.

=== The sleeping preacher ===
John D. Kauffman, who was member of an Amish Mennonite congregation, started to preach in June 1880, but it took until 1907, when he and some of his followers moved from Elkhart County, Indiana, to Shelby County, Illinois, to form their own congregation, Mt. Hermon Church. In the beginning they were without bishop, but later bishop John R. Zook from Lawrence County, Pennsylvania, came and ordained Peter Zimmerman as their bishop. Against his will, but at the instruction of the Holy Spirit, Kauffman was also ordained bishop in 1911.

After the death of John D. Kauffman in 1913, Joseph Reber was ordained as the leader of the church in 1914 and in 1954 he was still in this position.

Their first congregation, Mt. Hermon near Shelbyville, Illinois, assimilated into the Mennonite mainstream over the years, but the Fairfield congregation in Tampico, Illinois, which broke away from the Mt. Hermon church in 1933 and moved to Henry County, Illinois, in 1938 and to Tampico, Bureau County, Illinois, in 1944, preserved the old ways of the Kauffman Amish Mennonite, using German in its services and emphasizing Kauffman's "Spirit preaching".

The Kauffman Amish Mennonite later moved to other states, especially to Missouri where about half of them live now, and to Arkansas where about a quarter of them live now.

== Belief and practice ==
As descendants from the Amish, the Kauffman Amish Mennonites are an Anabaptist Christian group in the tradition of the Radical Reformation of the early 16th century. In contrast to other Amish Mennonites they have largely retained the Pennsylvania German language, which they also use for church service. The Pennsylvania German language is seen as a "neat wall" against the evil influence of the "world".

Sermons make frequent mention of Kauffman's teachings, referring to his statements as the preaching with the words "The Spirit taught us . . ." According to Pius Hostetler, the followers of Kauffman saw his preaching as "Spirit preaching", therefore regarded as an authoritative interpretation of the Bible and binding upon his followers.

The dress of the Kauffman Amish Mennonites is similar to the Beachy Amish in many respects although the men normally wear longer beards, and lapel coats are with buttons instead of hooks and eyes. In the mid-1980s men still wore Amish-like beards, hats and suspenders while women wore head coverings, bonnets, capes, aprons and black stockings.

The practice of shunning (German: Bann und Meidung) was supported by the preaching of John Kauffman. It is still practiced today.

== Members and congregations ==
Kauffman Amish Mennonite members by year
Year	Congre- gations	Members
1953	1	143
~1995	11	~900
2001	?	1,222
2008	16	1,450
2017	18	2,011

The vast majority of members are descending from followers of John Kauffman, thus of old Amish stock with typical Amish names like Hostetler, Schwartzentruber, Kauffman, Blosser, Kropf and Schrock. The percentage of members from a non-Mennonite background is relatively small but larger than in Old Order Amish affiliations.

Anabaptists make a distinction between baptized members and the total population that consists also of their children and young people who live in the group without being baptized. The number of adherents or souls also includes children and young people.

In 1938 the Tampico Amish Mennonites had one church, 17 households and 130 souls and in 1957 the "Sleeping Preacher Churches" had six congregations with a total membership of 540, but only the Fairfield congregation, four miles south of Tampico, Illinois, which had 143 members in 1953, did not assimilate into the Mennonite mainstream. In the mid 1990s the Tampico Amish Mennonites had eleven congregations with about 900 church members.

In 2008 they had 1,450 baptized members. In 2010 the "Tampico Amish Mennonite Churches" had 3,342 adherents, including children and young adults who are not yet baptized. In 2017 there were 18 congregations with 2,011 baptized members and in 2014 they had 18 churches, 714 households and more than 3,500 members, mainly living in Missouri and Arkansas.

== Literature ==
Kauffman Amish Mennonite adherents by state and year
State	Souls in 2000	Souls in 2010	Souls in 2020
Missouri	1,159	1,701	2,056
Arkansas	433	883	1,034
Illinois	504	378	388
Wisconsin	169	207	260
Iowa	-	103	247
Colorado	57	70	105
Kentucky	-	109	?
All states	2,322	3,342	4,090

John D. Kauffman and his followers inspired Julia Kasdorf to write her poetry book "Sleeping Preacher", which was published in 1992 and for which she won the Agnes Lynch Starrett Poetry Prize.

=== Further reading ===
- Pius Hostetler: The Life, Preaching, and Labors of John D. Kauffman, Shelbyville, Illinois, 1915.
- Jacob Christner: Kauffman's Sermons, Tampico, Illinois: Tornado Print, no date, 24 pages. (First edition, 1915; second edition, 1948).
- Aarni Voipio: Sleeping Preachers: a Study in Ecstatic Religiosity, Helsinki, 1951.
- Harry H. Hiller: The Sleeping Preacher: An Historical Study of the Role of Charisma in Amish Society in Pennsylvania Folklife 18 (Winter 1968/69), pages 19-31.
- Don Yoder: Trance-Preaching in the United States in Pennsylvania Folklife 18 (Winter 1968/69), pages 12-18.
- Phoebe A. Brubaker: Possession Trance and Plain Coats : The Lives, Times, and Trances of Amish Mennonite "Sleeping" Preachers Noah Troyer and John D. Kauffman, 1878-1920, manuscript at Goshen College, History Senior Seminar, 2003.
- Gary Eugene Blosser: 2016 Church Directory of the "Tampico" Amish-Mennonite Churches, 2016, 568 pages.

== See also ==
- Subgroups of Amish
