= Tears of April =

- Directed by: Aku Louhimies
- Written by: Jari Rantala
- Based on: Käsky by Leena Lander
- Produced by: Aleksi Bardy
- Starring: Samuli Vauramo; Pihla Viitala; Eero Aho
- Cinematography: Rauno Ronkainen
- Edited by: Benjamin Mercer
- Music by: Pessi Levanto
- Production company: Helsinki-filmi
- Distributed by: FS Film
- Release dates: 22 August 2008 (Espoo Film Festival); 29 August 2008 (Finland)
- Country: Finland
- Language: Finnish
- Budget: €1.5 million
- Box office: €274,079 (domestic)

Tears of April (Finnish: Käsky) is a 2008 Finnish war drama film directed by Aku Louhimies. Based on the novel Käsky by Leena Lander, the film is set in the final stages of the Finnish Civil War.

== Plot ==
The film tells a story of a captured female Red Guard fighter, Miina, and the soldier Aaro who escorts her to her trial. The fictional character Emil Hallenberg is loosely based on the actual Erik Grotenfelt, a poet turned judge and executioner.

== Cast ==
- Samuli Vauramo as Aaro Harjula
- Pihla Viitala as Miina Malin
- Eero Aho as Emil Hallenberg
- Eemeli Louhimies as Eino
- Miina Maasola as Martta
- Riina Maidre as Beata Hallenberg
- Sulevi Peltola as Konsta
- Oskar Pöysti as Paasonen
