= Konttinen =

Konttinen is a Finnish surname. Notable people with the surname include:

- Helena Konttinen (1871–1916), Finnish Christian prophet
- Sirkka-Liisa Konttinen (born 1948), Finnish photographer
