= Pihla Viitala =

Finnish actress (born 1982)

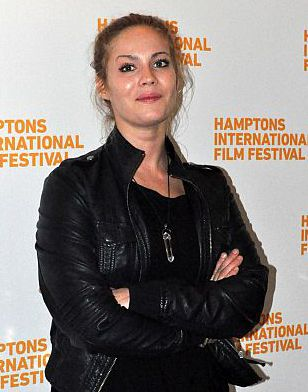
- Viitala in 2010
- Born: 30 September 1982 (age 43); Helsinki, Uusimaa, Finland
- Education: Helsinki Theatre Academy
- Occupation: Actress
- Years active: 2006–present
- Spouses: Kerkko Koskinen (m. 2004; div. 2008) Alexander Schimpf (m. 2011)
- Children: 2

Pihla Viitala (born 30 September 1982) is a Finnish actress. She studied acting at the Helsinki Theatre Academy.

== Personal life ==
In 2004, Viitala married musician Kerkko Koskinen; the couple divorced in 2008. She married Kazakh-German Alex Schimpf in 2011, and the couple have two children together. The family lives in Helsinki.

Finnish actress Rebecca Viitala is her cousin.

== Filmography ==
Film
Year	Title	Role	Notes
2007	Ganes	Nina	
2008	Tears of April	Miina Malin	
2008	Jungle of Dreams	Sara	
2009	Hellsinki	Monika	
2009	Pihalla	Meri	
2009	Reykjavik Whale Watching Massacre	Anette	
2010	Bad Family	Tilda	
2010	The Hustlers	Anna	
2011	Red Sky	Cordova	
2011	Elokuu	Johanna	
2012	Must Have Been Love	Helmi	
2013	Hansel and Gretel: Witch Hunters	Mina	
2015	Latin Lover	Solveig	
2017	Kuudes Kerta	Annika	Also movienames: "The sixth time" and "Honeybunnies"
2017	Kaiken Se Kestää	Marja	English Name: "Star Boys"
2018	Stupid Young Heart	Ansku	
2019	Maria's Paradise	Maria Åkerblom	

Television
Year	Title	Role	Notes
2007	Sanaton sopimus	Mia Valtonen	TV movie
2008	Lemmenleikit	Janina Lundberg	4 episodes
2008	Projectors	Leena	2 episodes
2009	Ihmebantu	Herself	1 episode
2010	Our Little Brother	Siiri	TV movie
2010	Virta	Amanda Välke	2 episodes
2013	Hellfjord	Riina	7 episodes
2014-2016	Mustat lesket	Veera Joentie	24 episodes
2018-2022	Deadwind	Sofia Karppi	28 episodes
2018	Arctic Circle	Marita Kautsalo	10 episodes
2018	Kieler Street	Natasja	2 episodes
2020	Cold Courage	Mari	Upcoming

== Awards ==
- 2010 Shooting Stars Award
