= Alcan Highway (film) =

2013 film directed by Aleksi Salmenperä

- Film poster
- Directed by: Aleksi Salmenperä
- Produced by: Marko Antila, Yrjö Nieminen, Ulla Simonen
- Cinematography: Henri Blomberg (2nd camera Aleksi Salmenperä)
- Edited by: Samu Heikkilä
- Music by: Ville Tanttu
- Distributed by: Made Oy
- Release date: April 19, 2013
- Running time: 89 minutes
- Country: Finland
- Language: English

Alcan Highway is a 2013 documentary film by the Finnish director Aleksi Salmenperä. It is a road movie about a dream of being somewhere else. The film was shot in 2011.

== The film ==
The protagonist of the film is Hese Tolonen of Helsinki, Finland, who does not have a permanent dwelling in his home town. Freezing weather, snow and a vagrant lifestyle do not go well together, and Hese has come to the conclusion that the best location for him with his lifestyle would be on Vancouver Island on the West Coast of Canada. He wants to acquire a cheap place for himself, with wheels. For this, he finds and old abandoned GMC truck in a junk yard in Wasilla, Alaska. The truck is 63 years old, and it has not been started for 40 years. The price tag is 700 dollars. He mounts an Airstream Land Yacht jerry on top of it, and this will be his new living quarters.

Hese's old friend Jon Ayres and a truck mechanic named Rhys Palmer help him build and repair the truck. Jon has taken a three week leave from his job, and Rhys has promised to his family that he would be back at home after two weeks. Hese does not have a definite schedule for his road trip. Bennett Durgeloh, the owner of the Wasilla junk yard, and his wife Rhonda allow the men to work at the junk yard.

When the three men are able to hit the road, they can only drive at 55–65 miles per hour. If they drive faster, there will be considerable vibration and reeling to be dealt with. However, the three decide to see how fast the truck can be driven. As a result of this, smoke comes into the cabin, and the men have to take a break. Hese pours the wrong kind of oil into the engine, but Rhys is able to start it anyhow. Once they are in Canada, they stop at a service station, and a loud explosion is heard from the truck, flames arise from the engine, and a cloud of smoke arises to the sky. Nevertheless, the men are able to fix the truck, and the trip goes on.

== Reception ==
Olli-Matti Oinonen of Savon Sanomat wrote that the film is an open air, atmospheric feel-good road movie: “Alaska Highway is about fixing a truck, of travelling and of beautiful sceneries, but nevertheless director Salmenperä has been able to create magical tension, in which the viewer is wondering, together with Tolonen, whether the old truck will be able to make it in its new task. [– –] Henri Blomberg has done a fine job with the cinematography, and thanks to the music composed by Ville Anselmi Tanttu, there is an air of great freedom in the film. The viewer can even feel the breeze on his face. Even the dog travelling with Rhys Palmer seems to enjoy the freedom and the road trip.”

Kalle Kinnunen of Suomen Kuvalehti compared the film to Andrei Rubliov by Andrei Tarkovsky and its famous episode of casting a church bell. “The atmosphere is that of sacredness, but it is also a heavy one: they must push through with this project. [– –] Alcan Highway surprises by being an interesting film although nothing significant seems to be happening in it. No explanations are given for Hese's character, that of an aimless wanderer. There is only one scene in which the narrator reveals some of Hese's personal history, and things seem to fall into place, just as they should. At the end the narrator states, that we are not making the trip, but the trip is shaping us. This is already superfluous. We did already get the point earlier on. This trip leaves behind a warm afterglow.”

Anna Möttölä of Helsingin Sanomat Nyt also wrote positively of the film. “Let it be said here at the very beginning: I know nothing about trucks and I am not interested in them. Nevertheless, I immediately fell in love with this film. Salmenperä and the cinematographer Hena Blomberg serve us sparingly the beautiful mountain landscapes of Alaska — and when they finally open up before our eyes, the effect is even more impressive. The splendid music of Ville Anselmi Tanttu and the orchestra take us along this trip. Alcan Highway does not preach the blessings of downshifting, and neither does it glorify the lifestyle of the protagonist. It tells of a pursuit of a dream and of freedom — and of acquiring a home, which one can find in a run down yacht jerry.”

John Anderson of the film magazine Variety wrote that the film is like watching “Chekhov in a junkyard”: “The locales are unsurprisingly gorgeous, and Hena Blomberg's lensing is first-rate. Less obvious and more critical is the film's sense of construction — the way Salmenperä shoots Tolonen's various actions, and the truck's, to create sense of a fluidity, motion and solitude. [– –] Once Palmer and Ayres go back to their lives (they’d only signed on for a limited time), Tolonen is supposed to be on his own, and that's the way it feels. How Salmenperä choreographs this is one of the film's joys. [– –] Production values are first-rate, including the music, except perhaps when Tolonen is singing.”

== Hese Tolonen ==
Hese Tolonen (1967–2020) was an industrial designer, who graduated from the Helsinki School of Arts and Design (Taik) in 2000. As his final project he created a sculpture that was also a working motorcycle. From the beginning it was clear to him that the motorcycle would be presented in an art context. “I’m more of a freak artist than a designer”, he said.

Hese got to know one of the main characters of the film, Jon Ayres, in 1997, when they both studied in Taik. At the time Ayres was studying glass blowing there. Later Hese visited Ayers in Toronto, where they both worked in various studios. When Ayres moved to Vancouver Island, Hese visited him there in 2008. There the two promised to “make one big road trip before we got too old to do that.” The idea was to drive around in California, but the plans changed, when Hese found a truck in Wasilla, Alaska. Palmer came to the project through Ayers; he was the mechanically inclined one of the group.

Motorcycles, cars and buses and building them were Hese's passions. In 2003, he came up with something that was called the SaunaBus project. It was a combined sauna and a showroom, presented at the 2003 Milan Furniture Fair.

In 1992, Hese was one of the founders of the motorcycle magazine Kopteri. He was found for this film through his motorcycling hobby. He died as a result of a road accident in 2020. He was out on his motorcycle, stopped at traffic lights on Vihdintie, Konala, Helsinki, when a car approached the intersection at a high speed and ran over him, trying to make it through the intersection even though the lights had already turned to red. He died of his injuries in a local hospital a few days later. On 3 October 2020, he was commemorated with a motorcycle ride, in which 350 cyclists participated.
