= Skavabölen pojat =

- Directed by: Zaida Bergroth
- Written by: Jan Forsström
- Produced by: Nicole Gerhards; Jarkko Hentula; Hanneke M. van der Tas
- Starring: Lauri Tilkanen; Iiro Panula; Ilmari Järvenpää; Onni Tommila; Leea Klemola; Martti Suosalo
- Edited by: Niels Pagh Andersen
- Music by: Alexander Hacke
- Production company: Juonifilmi Oy
- Release date: 4 September 2009
- Running time: 126 minutes
- Country: Finland
- Language: Finnish

Skavabölen pojat (Finnish for "the boys from Skavaböle/Hyrylä") is a 2009 Finnish drama film. It was directed by Zaida Bergroth and based on a play by the same name, written by Antti Raivio in 1991 and performed at Q-teatteri in the 1990s. Skavabölen pojat is a story about two brothers, growing from children to adults, from the early 1970s to the early 1980s, in Grankulla/Kauniainen and Skavaböle/Hyrylä in the Greater Helsinki Area.

The film was awarded the Flash Forward prize at the Busan International Film Festival in South Korea.

== Plot ==
The film varies between the "present" in the early 1980s, and the brothers' childhood in the early 1970s.

== Cast ==
- Ilmari Järvenpää as Rupert Kallio
- Onni Tommila as Evert
- Lauri Tilkanen
- Iiro Panula
- Leea Klemola (mother)
- Martti Suosalo (father)
- Elina Knihtilä
- Tommi Korpela
- Sulevi Peltola
- Henriikka Salo
- Eila Roine

== Reception ==
In the film review column in the Helsingin Sanomat weekly supplement Nyt, four critics gave the film an average score of 3.3 out of 5.
