= Peltomaa =

Peltomaa is a Finnish surname. Notable people with the surname include:

- Petja Peltomaa (born 1971), Finnish screenwriter
- Timo Peltomaa (born 1968), Finnish ice hockey player
