= Jukka Rasila =

Finnish actor and voice actor

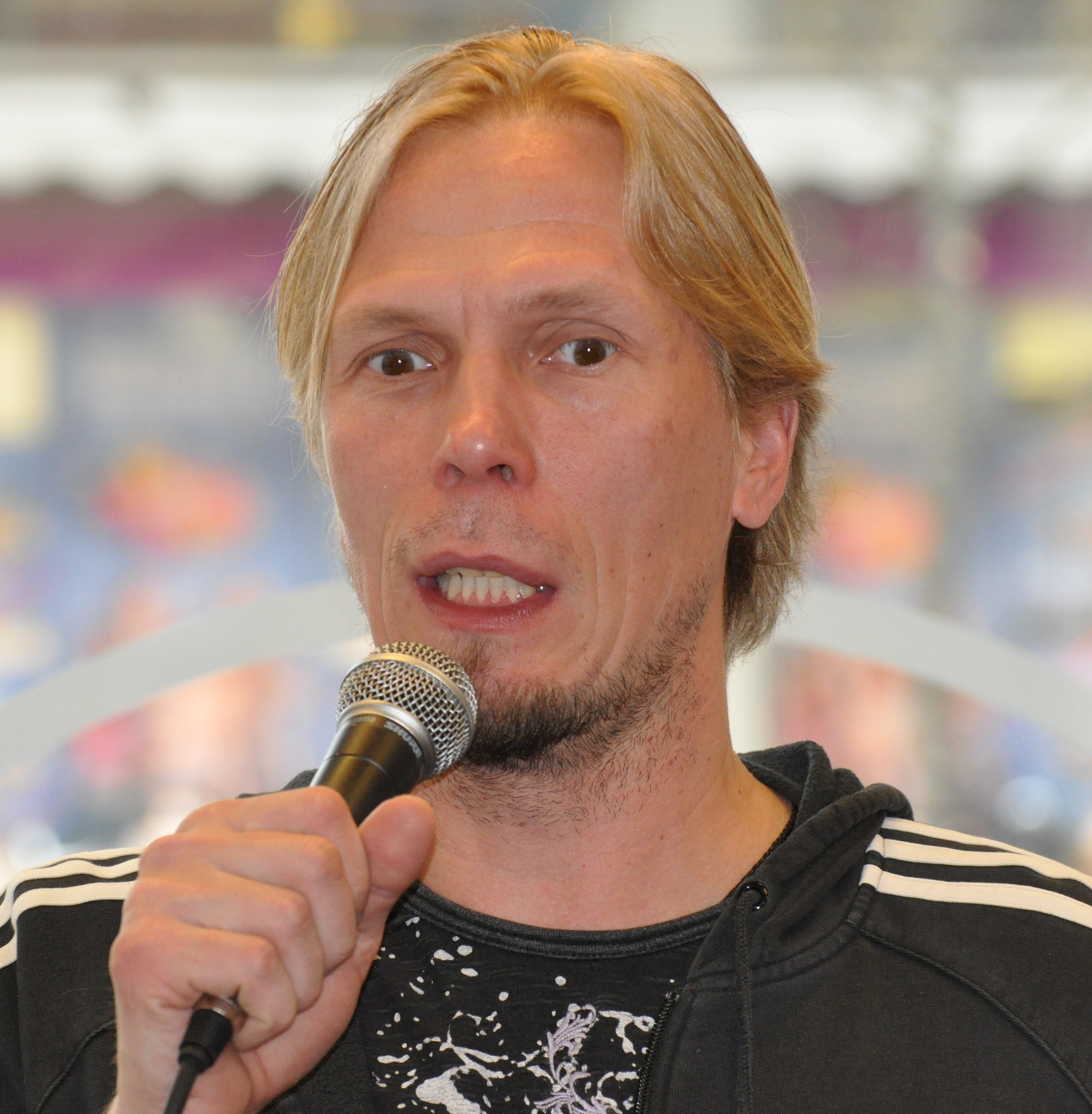
Rasila in 2010

Jukka "Jugi" Rasila (born 12 August 1969 in Oulu, Finland) is a Finnish actor and voice actor.

== Career ==
Rasila is best known for starring in several television comedy programs, such as Studio Julmahuvi, Putous and Ihmebantu, while often appearing on stage and in films. In 2010, Rasila competed in the fifth season of Tanssii tähtien kanssa, a Finnish version of the British television series Strictly Come Dancing, and finished in third place. Also frequently working as a voice actor, Rasila has served as the Finnish voice of Donald Duck since May 1993.

== Selected filmography ==
=== In films ===
- Pieniä valheita (1994)
- FC Venus (2005)
- Kummelin Jackpot (2006)
- Kummeli Alivuokralainen (2008)
- Risto Räppääjä ja polkupyörävaras (2010)
- Prinsessa (2010)
- Herra Heinämäki ja Leijonatuuliviiri (2011)
- Kummeli V (2014)
- Se mieletön remppa (2020)

=== On television ===
- Häkkilinnut (1991)
- Toini ja Heikki Haaman Show (1995–1996)
- Studio Julmahuvi (1998)
- Tummien vesien tulkit (2002)
- Kymenlaakson laulu (2008)
- Ihmebantu (2009)
- Putous (2010–2014)
- Amazing Race Suomi (2023)
