= Rumble (2002 film) =

- Official poster
- Directed by: Jani Volanen
- Written by: Jani Volanen; Jari Nissinen
- Starring: Tommi Korpela; Vesa-Matti Loiri; Jari Nissinen; Jari Pehkonen
- Release date: 2002
- Running time: 55 minutes
- Country: Finland
- Language: Finnish

Rumble is a 2002 Finnish comedy road trip short film with Tommi Korpela, Vesa-Matti Loiri, Jari Nissinen, and Jari Pehkonen. It was directed and co-written by Jani Volanen.

== Plot ==
The film is about four Finnish Teddy Boy or rockabilly friends who travel in the Finnish countryside in a 1960 Cadillac.

== Soundtrack ==
- Gene Vincent & His Blue Caps: B-I-Bickey-Bi, Bo-Bo-Go
- The Johnny Otis Show: Willie and the Hand Jive
- Johnny Burnette & The Rock'n Roll Trio: The Train Kept A-Rollin'
- Don & Dewey: Koko Joe
- Roy Orbison & Teen Kings: Go! Go! Go!
- Augie Rios: Linda Lou
- Elvis Presley: Blue Moon
- Freddie Cannon: Tallahassee Lassie
- Sandy Nelson: Let There Be Drums
- The Flamingos: I Only Have Eyes for You
- Ray Sharpe: Linda Lu
- Thurston Harris: Little Bitty Pretty One
- Ronnie Dee: Action Packed
- Ronnie Self: Bop-A-Lena
- Jackie Morningstar: Rockin' in the Graveyard
- The Teen Queens: Eddie My Love
- Shep and the Limelites: Daddy's Home
- Lord Dent & His Invaders: Wolf Call
- The Wailers: Mau Mau
- The Capris: There's a Moon Out Tonight
- The Jive Bombers: Bad Boy
