= Åkerblom Movement =

Finnish evangelical movement

The Åkerblom Movement was an evangelical movement often described as a sect active in Finland in the late 1910s and early 1920s. The movement was most active in Swedish speaking Ostrobothnia, but it attracted people also in the south of Finland. The leader of the movement was the young girl Maria Åkerblom from the village of Snappertuna in Uusimaa.

The sect has its roots in Snappertuna in 1917, when it is said that twelve-year-old Maria Åkerblom received prophesies from God. Åkerblom was struck by sickness and as she fell asleep, she started to preach. She delivered her speeches in trance as a so-called "sleeping preacher". This happened several times, and Åkerblom became famous. Services with Åkerblom preaching became more and more popular and her reputation spread throughout Finland. She started to travel around in Finland preaching.

Åkerblom's sermons attracted most people in the northern parts of Ostrobothnia, especially in the Kokkola-region and the village of Terjärv. In the beginning no problems occurred as the movement started spreading in the region. Later, though, the members of the movement were accused of several different crimes, for instance shooting a policeman, stealing and physical violence.

The movement grew larger in the early 1920s, in spite of all the accusations made against it. The leaders of the movement decided that all the members should sell all their belongings and give it to the sect. The movement's aim was to move to the holy land of Israel.

The Åkerblom Movement did not make it that far, though. In the 1920s it fell apart because of all the accusations and trials it went through. Some members remained close to Maria Åkerblom, but the vast majority returned to normal life.
