= Antti Luusuaniemi =

Finnish actor

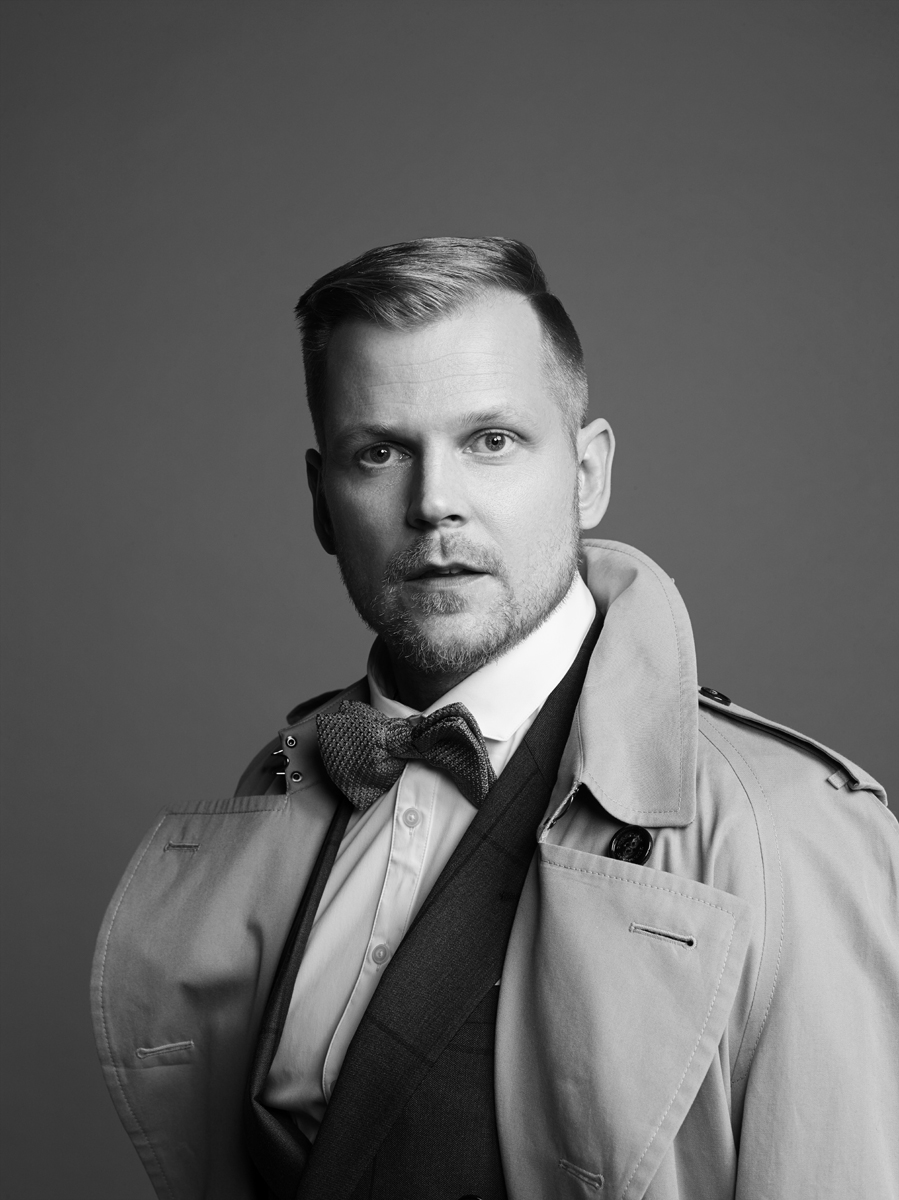
- Luusuaniemi in 2017
- Born: 7 September 1979 (age 46); Ekenäs, Finland
- Occupation: Actor
- Years active: 2003–present

Antti Luusuaniemi (born 7 September 1979) is a Finnish actor. He appeared in more than thirty films since 2003.

== Selected filmography ==
=== Film ===
Year	Title	Role	Notes
2005	Shadow of the Eagle		
2010	The Hustlers		
2016	Little Wing		
2016	The Liberation of Skopje		
2021	Reunion 3: Singles Cruise	Karno	
2021	The Potato		

=== TV ===
- Syke (2014)
- M/S Romantic (2019)
- Helsinki Syndrome (2022, 2024)

== Personal life ==
Luusuaniemi has two children with Hungarian-born Lili Zoe Ermezei, to whom he was married from 2012 to 2024. They lived in Hungary and Finland. Luusuaniemi also has one child from a previous relationship.
