= John D. Kauffman =

Amish Mennonite bishop (1847–1913)

John D. Kauffman (7 July 1847 – 22 October 1913) was an Amish Mennonite minister and later bishop who preached while being in a state of trance and who was seen as a "sleeping preacher". The Kauffman Amish Mennonites, a group with about 3,500 members, still adhere to his teachings.

John D. Kauffman was born in Logan County, Ohio, but moved with his parents to Elkhart County, Indiana, at a young age. After the limited school education typical for the Amish he joined the Amish Mennonite church, married Sarah Stutsman and became a farmer.

After being struck by an illness with a lot of pain, he began preaching in a state of trance in June 1880. An article of the Herald of Truth reported on 15 May 1882 that he had preached together with Noah Troyer (1831–1886), who was also an Amish "sleeping preacher", both in an "unconscious state", Kauffman after Troyer, each for about two hours. He preached for several years every Wednesday evening and every Sunday evening until 1911, when he was ordained bishop. He travelled a lot to preach in other Mennonite churches in the U.S. and in Canada.

In 1907 he moved to Shelbyville, Illinois, with his followers because of conflicts with the Amish Mennonites in the Elkhart region and organized, with his followers, an independent congregation, called Mt. Hermon. In 1911 he was ordained bishop there by Bishop Peter Zimmerman of the Linn Amish Mennonite Church in Roanoke, Illinois.

In September 1913 he knew that he was to die soon and said farewell to his followers. Some weeks later, on 22 October 1913, he died at his home.

== Literature ==
- Pius Hostetler: The Life, Preaching, and Labors of John D. Kauffman, Shelbyville, Illinois, 1915.
- Jacob Christner: Kauffman's Sermons, Tampico, Illinois: Tornado Print, no date, 24 pages. (First edition, 1915; second edition, 1948).
- Jacob Christner: Predigten von Johannis D. Kauffman, Burnsville, N.C., 1959.
- Harry H. Hiller: The Sleeping Preacher: An Historical Study of the Role of Charisma in Amish Society in Pennsylvania Folklife 18 (Winter 1968/69), pages 19–31.
- Phoebe A. Brubaker: Possession Trance and Plain Coats : The Lives, Times, and Trances of Amish Mennonite "Sleeping" Preachers Noah Troyer and John D. Kauffman, 1878-1920, manuscript at Goshen College, History Senior Seminar, 2003.
