= Pekka Karjalainen =

Finnish film director and sound producer (born 1961)

- Born: 1961 (age 63–64); Finland
- Occupations: Director; sound producer
- Awards: Jussi Award

Pekka Karjalainen (born 1961) is a Finnish film director and sound producer. He won the Jussi Award in the category of Best Sound Design for his work on 2001's Joki.

== Filmography ==
- Hysteria, (1993)
- Minäkin rakastan sinua, (TV) (1998)
- Silmä silmästä (1999)
- Minä, joki ja metsä, (TV) (2000)
- Liekki, (TV) (2002)
- Beatlehem, (TV) (2003)
- Kummelin jackpot, (2006)
- Matchen (Short), (2018)
- Arno (Documentary Short), (2019)
- All the Sins (TV Series), (2019)
