= Jefferson Anderson =

Finnish animated sitcom

- Finnish: Pasila
- Genre: Animated sitcom
- Directed by: Atte Järvinen
- Voices of: Jani Volanen; Kari Hietalahti; Juho Milonoff; Mari Lehtonen (English cast); Brian R. Norris; Eric Bauza; Dorothy Elias-Fahn
- Country of origin: Finland
- Original language: Finnish
- No. of seasons: 6
- No. of episodes: 64

Production
- Production location: Finland

Original release
- Network: Yle TV2
- Release: 17 February 2007

Jefferson Anderson (Finnish: Pasila) is a Finnish animated sitcom. The animated series portrays a satirical view of daily events in Helsinki at a police precinct in the suburb of Pasila. The series is made by members of the same team that made the award-winning series The Autocrats, a political animated satire. In 2007, the Finnish Broadcasting Company (Yle) sent Jefferson Anderson to compete for the Rose d'Or. The show's first two seasons were later dubbed in English and are available online. A sequel, Pasila 2.5 – The Spin-Off, was broadcast from 2014 to 2016.

== Characters ==
=== Lieutenant Kyösti Pöysti (Jefferson Anderson) ===
Pöysti (voiced by Jani Volanen (original series), Tero Koponen (spin-off)) is the main character, aged 30 or 31 years throughout the series. He is single and is always seen sucking on a pacifier, showing his infantility and emotional handicap. However, his jadedness and penetrating cynicism allows him to see through schemes and discern motives. Pöysti's modus operandi can be described as psychological: he finds the sore spots of criminals by going through several options and uses them to crack the perps – or not. Sometimes he goes for overkill, like provoking people to jump off the roof or arresting innocent people without grounds.

=== Precinct captain Rauno Repomies ===
Repomies (voiced by Kari Hietalahti) is the Captain of the Pasila precinct, a man with a moustache and heavy medication. He is nearing retirement and often displays antiquated manners. He keeps on getting more confused and more poetic, until someone usually reminds him to take his pills. He is extremely gullible and many episodes involve him ending up as the victim of the main perpetrator. Repomies and Pöysti have a bad relationship because of their incompatibility: Repomies is annoyed by Pöysti's slacking and disrespect for authority, but his authoritarian management practices aren't very successful at dealing with this either.

=== Officer Tommi Neponen ===
Neponen (voiced by Juho Milonoff) is Pöysti's classmate from the Police Academy. He's described as the only sane person in the Pasila precinct. He's been married for seven years and has children. Although Pöysti considers him a friend, there is a running joke that Pöysti doesn't remember Neponen's first name.

=== Desk sergeant Pekka Routalempi ===
Routalempi (voiced by Juho Milonoff) is the 46-year-old desk sergeant at the precinct. He keeps on pondering common things in everyday life and considers these phenomena "fascinating". As he explains in an episode, this behaviour was adopted after he stopped drinking and therefore saw how wonderful life could be even without alcohol. His stories are so mind-numbingly boring that Repomies thinks using him as an interrogator is a violation of human rights treaties (which is "fascinating" too). He is divorced. He is terrible at chases, because he doesn't want to hurt people and doesn't want to overtake other cars.

=== Helga ===
Helga (voiced by Mari Lehtonen) is the token woman police officer, although very manly in her manners and the most macho of all characters. Her father is ashamed of his daughter, as he wanted a son. He threw Helga into a river as a baby. Helga is doing her best to fulfill her father's wishes and blames her mother for being a girl.

=== Juhani Kontiovaara ===
Juhani Kontiovaara (voiced by Jani Volanen (original series), Tero Koponen (spin-off)) is the presenter in the morning TV show Huomenta ihmiset ("Good Morning, People"). His voice and behavior is exaggeratedly calm. The character is a parody of Lauri Karhuvaara, presenter at Huomenta Suomi. In his free time, he goes orienteering during the weekends. He holds the police in high esteem and he thinks he's Pöysti's best friend, even though Pöysti hates him and his show.

=== Darja ===
Darja appears in the spin-off series. She is a hippie that does yoga and believes in horoscopes and auras. No criminal investigation method, such as meditation or remote seeing, is too far out for her. She tries to see the best in everyone, being reluctant to assume malice or use force. However, this is only up to a point; she can be firm if pushed enough.

== Episodes ==
=== Season 1 ===
No.	Title
1	"Vasikka" "The Snitch"
Officer Nikander is shot dead by accident by his colleagues and is replaced by Kyösti Pöysti. Pöysti starts to investigate Nikander's major case, catching an international smuggling league of bootlegged CDs.
2	"Kiinalainen työvoima" "Chinese Workers"
Illegal Chinese workers have been brought to Finland in a container. Pöysti starts to investigate who brings them into the country and how.
3	"Toteemieläin" "Totem Animal"
Pöysti is on fire, taking down suspects one by one. He enters a bank to stop a robbery in progress but ends up as a hostage himself.
4	"Vanhempainyhdistys" "Parents' Association"
Unwittingly, Pöysti infiltrates a dangerous group of school-burners, the Hermanni Elementary School Parents' Association.
5	"Linnoittautuneet vanhukset" "The Fortified Senior Citizens"
Helga's father has a nasty amount of unlicensed weapons at home after his service. Helga and Neponen are sent to raid the place and blockade a group of senior citizens protecting him.
6	"Reetta Ruusu"
Pöysti has to stop the premiere of choreographer Reetta Ruusu's dance performance "I demand God pay for this" because it will put the dancers' lives at risk.
7	"Algamis"
Pöysti and Neponen are investigating the mysterious death of role player Samuli alias Milhindor Assentian during a LARP game.
8	"Phil Collins -darra" "Phil Collins Hangover"
Pöysti wakes up with a hangover that eventually escalates into a state where everyone starts to resemble Phil Collins. A pastiche of his piece "Another Day in Paradise" is also playing in his head.
9	"Luennoitsija" "Lecturer"
Professional con man Kauko Palmgren-Palmgren is released from prison. Meanwhile, Repomies is having a personal crisis.
10	"Laillinen bordelli" "Legal brothel"
The first legal brothel of Finland is opened in Helsinki. This causes turmoil in the police force as well as the whole city.
11	"Avainpelaaja" "Key Player"
Laakkonen, a man frustrated in his life, goes amok at home and Pöysti is sent to solve the situation. A series of pursuits ensues.
12	"Terroristi" "Terrorist"
The City of Helsinki celebrates its birthday, but the procession is threatened by terrorist Pasi "The Bomb" Jussilainen.

=== Season 2 ===
No.	Title
13	"Orvot koirat" "Orphan Dogs"
In a hostage situation, Routalempi accidentally shoots a dog with a rocket launcher. An organization called The Finnish Friends of St. Petersburgs Orphan Dogs starts protesting.
14	"Puolesta ja vastaan" "For And Against"
Repomies gets access to the Internet and sends his policemen to investigate comments posted on chat rooms.
15	"Apulaiskaupunginjohtaja" "Deputy Mayor"
Officer Pöysti is investigating death threats received by deputy mayor Jorma Hyvärinen.
16	"Mutsis oli" "Yo Momma"
Pöysti loses interest in police work and heads for Goa with the Madventures presenters.
17	"Stalkkeri" "Stalker"
Finland's hottest singer Jemmica Laamanen is the victim of an obsessive fan.
18	"Salaviina" "Counterfeit Liquor"
There's toxic liquor on the black market, blinding everyone who drinks it.
19	"Kerjäläiset" "Beggars"
Visitors from the EU are coming and Repomies has to clean up the streets of Helsinki of all the beggars.
20	"Eläke" "Retirement"
Repomies loses it totally and is persuaded to retire. Pöysti succeeds him as the captain.
21	"Olympiavoittaja" "The Olympic Winner"
Pöysti and his colleagues must follow the Hammer Throw Olympic Champion after he's released from prison.
22	"Veli" "Brother"
The police are after a man who's got the most speeding tickets in Finland.
23	"Kaksvitonen" "Twenty-fiver"
The Pasila Precinct has two bombing attacks to investigate. This episode is a parody of 24.
24	"Tauno Muikku"
The police investigates corruption charges against business mogul Tauno Muikku.
