= Selma Vilhunen =

Finnish film maker

- Born: October 1976 (age 49); Turku, Finland
- Occupation: film maker
- Years active: 1999–present

Selma Vilhunen (born October 1976 in Turku) is a Finnish film maker.

Vilhunen and fellow producer Kirsikka Saari received an Academy Awards nomination in the category of Best Live Action Short Film for the 2013 film Do I Have to Take Care of Everything?.

== Selected filmography ==
- Little Wing (2016)
- Stupid Young Heart (2018)
- Hobbyhorse Revolution a movie about hobby horsing
- Four Little Adults (2023)
