= Samu Heikkilä =

Finnish film editor

Samu Heikkilä (born 31 July 1971 in Karstula) is a Finnish film editor.

== Education ==
He graduated from University of Art and Design Helsinki with Master of Arts in Cinema in 1999.

== Career ==
He has won film editing awards for films such as Frozen Land and Girl Picture. In his career he has won seven awards and received ten nominations. In 2005 he was granted the State Prize for Cinema along with director Aku Louhimies and cinematographer Rauno Ronkainen. In 2019 he received the Nordisk Film Prize in Finland along with director Aleksi Salmenperä.

== Filmography ==
- Restless (2000)
- Lovers and Leavers (2002)
- The Free Fall (2002, TV series, 10 episodes)
- Juulia's Truths (2002, TV miniseries)
- Irtiottoja (2003, TV series)
- Young Gods (2003)
- Flowers and Binding (2004)
- Frozen Land (2005)
- Frozen City (2006)
- Revolution (2006, documentary)
- A Man's Work (2007)
- Shadow of the Holy Book (2007, documentary)
- Punksters & Youngsters (2008, documentary)
- Letters To Father Jacob (2009)
- A Man from the Congo River (2009, documentary)
- Bad Family (2010)
- Forever Yours (2011, documentary)
- Five Star Existence (2012, documentary)
- Leap (2012, documentary)
- Alcan Highway (2013, documentary)
- 8-Ball (2013)
- Dagmamman (2014)
- Other Girls (2015)
- Distractions (2015)
- The Mine (2016)
- Little Wing (2016)
- The Other Side of Hope (2017)
- Miami (2017)
- The Violin Player (2018)
- Void (2018)
- The Human Part (2018)
- Maria's Paradise (2019)
- White Wall (2020, TV series)
- Games People Play (2020)
- Tove (2020)
- Bubble (2022)
- Girl Picture (2022)
- Fallen Leaves (2022)
