= The Potato Venture =

2020 Finnish comedy film

- A film poster.
- Directed by: Joona Tena
- Written by: Pekko Pesonen
- Produced by: Olli Haikka; Marko Talli
- Starring: Joonas Nordman; Mikko Penttilä; Alex Anton; Kari Hietalahti; Linnea Leino; Kari Ketonen; Petteri Pennilä; Mimosa Willamo; Linda Manelius; Lasse Karkjärvi; Antti Tuomas Heikkinen; Hannes Suominen; Antti Luusuaniemi; Mikko Kouki; Ville Myllyrinne; Helmi-Leena Nummela; Eero Herranen; Marc Gassot; Tommi Korpela; Lauri Maijala
- Cinematography: Konsta Sohlberg
- Edited by: Jyrki Levä
- Music by: Panu Aaltio
- Production company: Yellow Film & TV
- Distributed by: SF Studios
- Release dates: December 25, 2020 (limited); August 13, 2021 (official)
- Running time: 109 minutes
- Country: Finland
- Language: Finnish
- Budget: €2,000,000

The Potato Venture (Finnish: Peruna, lit. 'Potato') is a 2020 Finnish comedy film directed by Joona Tena and written by Pekko Pesonen. The film follows Untamo (Joonas Nordman), a 17th-century startup entrepreneur attempting to introduce the potato to Finland, where the turnip is the reigning root vegetable.

== Production ==
Potato was filmed in Lithuania in the autumn of 2019 with a budget of €2,000,000, €787,745 of which came from the Finnish Film Foundation.

== Release ==
Potato was initially set to premiere on October 14, 2020, but was delayed due to the COVID-19 pandemic. The new release date was announced as December 25, 2020. It was shown in preview screenings in early 2021 and officially released on August 13, 2021. It was released on Blu-ray and DVD in November 2021.

== Cast ==
- Joonas Nordman as Untamo
- Mikko Penttilä as Axel
- Alex Anton as Magnus
- Kari Hietalahti as Kalevi
- Linnea Leino as Killisilmä
- Lasse Karkjärvi as Untamo's father
- Petteri Pennilä as Lord of the Castle
- Mimosa Willamo as Twin
- Linda Manelius as Twin
- Kari Ketonen as Advisor
- Antti Tuomas Heikkinen as Wheelbarrow Brother
- Hannes Suominen as Bucket Brother
- Antti Luusuaniemi as Lars
- Mikko Kouki as Copper Tycoon
- Ville Myllyrinne as Bishop
- Helmi-Leena Nummela as Village Prostitute
- Eero Herranen as Birger the Great
- Marc Gassot as Jester
- Tommi Korpela as Archangel Michael
- Lauri Maijala as Liquor Emperor
- Ilmari Kujansuu as Young Untamo

== Reception ==
The film received positive reviews.
