= Julmahuvi =

Finnish comedy collective

Julmahuvi (julma = cruel; huvi = fun) is the name of a group of comedic actors which created several comical TV-series and mockumentaries for the Finnish TV-channels Yle TV1 and MTV3. Julmahuvi collectively are Tommi Korpela, Jukka Rasila, Janne Reinikainen, Petteri Summanen and Jani Volanen.

The group first worked together on the sketch-show To(i)ni ja Heikki Haaman Show which ran from 1995 to 1996 on MTV3. After this they produced the mockumentary about a fictional boyband named The Joyboys Story in 1997.

The group's most famous show was the sketch show Studio Julmahuvi which ran for eight episodes on Yle in 1998. The show was a parody of YLE's own programming, squeezing an entire evening's worth of programming into a half-hour show which included everything from news and weather to a children's show and a German police drama, with commercials and TV-spots on the side. The show was created with an impressive budget of 67,000 € per episode which resulted in extremely high production-values (in comparison to Finnish low-budget sketch-shows like Pulttibois and Kummeli).

Afterwards Julmahuvi made Jerico 2000, a parody topic-show which also reused some of the smaller mockumentaries featured in Studio Julmahuvi. It aired on MTV3 in 1999. The last big production was the mini-series Mennen tullen which featured several characters from Studio Julmahuvi's fictional cop-shows now in the present day. It aired on YLE between 2000 and 2001. Though produced in the fashion of a serious murder-mystery, it was essentially a dark comedy with occasional absurd elements.

The Joyboys Story won the Bronze Rose of Montreux in 1997 and Studio Julmahuvi was awarded with the Venla (Finland's equivalent to an Emmy) prize for the best comedy show in 1999.

Studio Julmahuvi, The Joyboys Story, Jerico 2000 and Mennen tullen were all released as a box-set on DVD in 2005 with a bonus CD containing voice-clips and songs featured on Z-Salamapartio, one of the fictional cop-shows set in the 1970s.
