= Little Wing (2016 film) =

2016 film

- Film poster
- Finnish: Tyttö nimeltä Varpu
- Directed by: Selma Vilhunen
- Written by: Selma Vilhunen
- Produced by: Kai Nordberg; Kaarle Aho
- Starring: Linnea Skog; Paula Vesala
- Cinematography: Tuomo Hutri
- Edited by: Samu Heikkilä
- Music by: Jori Sjöroos; Paula Vesala
- Production companies: Making Movies; Final Cut for Real
- Release dates: 8 September 2016 (TIFF); 23 September 2016 (Finland)
- Running time: 100 minutes
- Countries: Finland; Denmark
- Language: Finnish

Little Wing (Finnish: Tyttö nimeltä Varpu) is a 2016 Finnish-Danish drama film directed by Selma Vilhunen. It was screened in the Discovery section at the 2016 Toronto International Film Festival. It won the 2017 Nordic Council Film Prize.

== Cast ==
- Linnea Skog as Varpu Miettinen
- Paula Vesala as Siru Miettinen
- Lauri Maijala as Varpu's father
- Santtu Karvonen as Bo
- Antti Luusuaniemi as Ilmari Hukkanen
- Niina Sillanpää as Emilia Hukkanen
- Outi Mäenpää as Riding Instructor
