= Syke (TV series) =

- Genre: Drama
- Created by: Series creator: Petja Peltomaa; Head writers: Petja Peltomaa (seasons 1–3, 5); Terhi Arola (season 4); Joona Kivirinta (season 5); Anne Prokofjeff (seasons 5–13); Hanna Leivonniemi (seasons 7–11); Hannamaija Matila (season 12)
- Directed by: Joona Tena (season 1); Aleksi Mäkelä (seasons 2, 4); Taavi Vartia (seasons 3, 5, 6, 10–12); Jäppi Savolainen (season 4); Toni Laine (seasons 6–13); Annika Grof (seasons 7–9)
- Starring: Lena Meriläinen; Leena Pöysti; Antti Luusuaniemi; Matti Ristinen; Tiina Lymi; Iina Kuustonen
- Country of origin: Finland
- No. of seasons: 17
- No. of episodes: 408

Production
- Running time: ~48 minutes (seasons 1–4); ~21 minutes (seasons 5–)
- Production company: Yellow Film & TV

Original release
- Network: Yle TV2 & Yle Areena
- Release: 29 October 2014 – 2017
- Network: Ruutu+
- Release: 2018 – present
- Network: Nelonen / Liv
- Release: 2019 – present

Syke (Pulse; or also known as Nurses) is a Finnish medical drama television series that has been airing since 2014. Set in the trauma department of a central hospital in a major city, the series initially focused on the lives of four nurses, both at work and during their personal time.

On its fourth season, the show expanded to include scenes outside the hospital, depicting ambulance operations, and by its fifth season, it encompassed the entire trauma department.

== Production ==
=== Creation and early years ===
The series Syke was created by Petja Peltomaa, who served as the head writer for its first three seasons and returned for the fifth season. Early working titles included Sisar hento valkoinen and Veitsenterällä.

Before its premiere, Yleisradio (Yle) set a target of 500,000 viewers per episode. The series exceeded this goal for certain episodes during its first season. Across its first two seasons, it averaged over 900,000 viewers, with an additional average of 165,000 views per episode on Yle Areena. Its first episode became Yle Areena's most-watched drama episode, surpassing 200,000 views.

Syke was filmed primarily in a Helsinki studio with custom-built 360-degree sets. Actors underwent training in hospital equipment and minor procedures before filming began in October 2013. Props, including artificial organs and blood, were sourced from the UK or created using materials like foam, silicone, and everyday items such as balloons and nylons.

The first season, directed by Joona Tena, consisted of ten episodes. Aleksi Mäkelä directed the second season, Taavi Vartia the third, and Jäppi Savolainen and Mäkelä split directing duties on the fourth. In 2016, the third season won the public vote for Best TV Show at the Golden Venla awards.

=== Transition to Nelonen Media ===
After Yle announced the series' conclusion with its fourth season in 2017, production company Yellow Film & TV negotiated its continuation on a different platform. In March 2018, it was announced that new seasons would premiere on the Ruutu streaming service starting November 2018.

Seasons five and six, filmed between July 2018 and March 2019, featured expanded sets and introduced new characters alongside returning leads. The fifth season adopted a new format of 40 shorter episodes divided into ten story arcs.

=== Main cast ===
- Lena Meriläinen as Lenita Pakkala
- Iina Kuustonen as Iiris Ketola (seasons 1–6, 13–14)
- Tiina Lymi as Marleena Nortamo (née Ranta) (seasons 1–5)
- Leena Pöysti as Johanna Alanko
- Antti Luusuaniemi as Max Hansson
- Lauri Tilkanen as Jarkko Vento (seasons 1–3)
- Jarkko Niemi as Petteri Holopainen (seasons 1–5, 17)
- Matti Ristinen as Ilmari Nortamo
- Jaana Pesonen as Marjut Blom
- Carl-Kristian Rundman as Olavi Kaskela (seasons 3–6)
- Juha-Tapio Arola as Artturi Laine (seasons 4–)
- Amelie Blauberg as Aino Tammilehto (seasons 5–)
- Senna Vodzogbe as Zahra Danquah (seasons 5–7, 14)
- Janne Saarinen as Niklas "Nikke" Uotila (seasons 5–)
- Marius Valtanen as Eetu Haataja (seasons 5–10, 13–14)
- Valtteri Lehtinen as Leevi Koskinen (seasons 5–)
- Sebastian Rejman as Jesper "Jesse" Adlercreutz (seasons 5–)
- Jenni Banerjee as Santtu Viljanen (seasons 5–8)
- Sanna Stellan as Ella Vaahtera (seasons 5–6, 11–12)
- Nicke Lignell as Jari Valkjärvi (seasons 7–)
- Iida-Maria Heinonen as Sonja Salmi (seasons 7–)
- Akseli Kouki as Santeri Valkjärvi (seasons 7–8, 10–13)
- Helmi-Leena Nummela as Jannica Ronkainen (seasons 7–)
- Janni Hussi as Vilma Davis (seasons 11–16)
- Mikko Nousiainen as Lauri Kivi (seasons 12–)

== Awards ==
- Golden Venla Best TV Show, 2016
