= Pihalla =

- Film poster
- Directed by: Toni Laine
- Written by: Petja Peltomaa; Sanna Reinumägi
- Starring: Sibel Kekilli; Mikko Leppilampi; Teemu Palosaari; Sanna-June Hyde; Matleena Kuusniemi; Pihla Viitala
- Release date: October 23, 2009
- Running time: 93 minutes
- Countries: Finland; Germany
- Languages: English; Finnish; German

Pihalla is a 2009 Finnish film directed by Toni Laine. The release date for the film was 23 October 2009.
