= Samuli Vauramo =

Finnish actor

- Born: 22 October 1981 (age 44); Vantaa, Finland

Samuli Vauramo (born 22 October 1981) is a Finnish actor.

Vauramo was born in Vantaa, Finland. Vauramo graduated from the Finnish Theatre Academy in 2005. After graduating he worked at the Theatre of Kotka, where he acted in Aleksis Kivi's famous play Nummisuutarit. In 2005, he starred as a rap DJ in the praised film Tyttö sinä olet tähti with Pamela Tola. He received a Jussi nomination (Finland's equivalent of an Oscar) for Best Leading Actor for his role. He has also appeared in several television series and is currently working on new film projects. He is considered one of Finland's most promising young actors. In 2009 Samuli Vauramo received the Shooting Star-award at the Berlin Film Festival.

== Filmography ==
=== Films ===
- Autumn Blood (2012) .... Hunter
- War of the Dead (2011) .... Kolya
- The American (2010)
- Bunraku (2010) .... Bully No. 1
- Käsky (2008) .... Aaro Harjula
- Lieksa! (2007) .... Kasper
- Tyttö sinä olet tähti (2005) .... Sune
- Mies vailla menneisyyttä (2002) .... extra

=== Television ===
- Conflict (2024) .... Captain Kraus
- H+: The Digital Series (2012) .... Topi Kuusela (web series)
- Uutishuone .... Vesa (12 episodes, 2009)
- Bodomin legenda (2006) (TV) .... Nils Grönholm
- Rikospoliisi ei laula (2006)
- Sairaskertomuksia .... An activist (3 episodes, 2004)

== Awards ==
- 2009 Shooting Stars Award by European Film Promotion at the Berlin International Film Festival
