= Lauri Tilkanen =

Finnish actor (born 1987)

Lauri Tilkanen (2026)

Lauri Tilkanen (born 6 November 1987) is a Finnish actor. He has appeared on television and in films such as Skavabölen pojat (2009), Paha perhe (2010), Hiljaisuus (2011), Härmä (2012) and Juoppohullun päiväkirja (2012). He studied at the Helsinki Theatre Academy and graduated in 2012.

Tilkanen was in a relationship with actress Pamela Tola since 2011. Tola gave birth to their son in March 2013. They married in 2015. They divorced in June 2020.

== Selected filmography ==
=== Films ===
- Skavabölen pojat (2009)
- Paha perhe / Bad Family (2010)
- Ei kenenkään maa (2009)
- Hiljaisuus (2011)
- Härmä (2012)
- Juoppohullun päiväkirja (2012)
- Wildeye (2015)
- Reunion (2015)
- Syysprinssi (2016)
- Tom of Finland (2017)
- Teräsleidit / Ladies of Steel (2020)
- Memory of Water (2022)

=== Television ===
- Nymphs (2014)
- Syke (2014)
- Tellus (2014)
- Deadwind (2018)
- Hotel Swan Helsinki (2020)
- Hildur (2026)
