= Autumn Blood =

- Film poster
- Directed by: Markus Blunder
- Written by: Markus Blunder; Stephen T. Barton
- Story by: Gunther Aloys
- Produced by: Markus Blunder
- Starring: Sophie Lowe; Maximilian Harnisch; Samuel Vauramo; Gustaf Skarsgård; Tim Morten Uhlenbrock; Annica McCrudden; Peter Stormare
- Cinematography: Reed Morano
- Edited by: Joe Landauer
- Music by: Robert Miller
- Production companies: Dreamrunner Pictures; Mountain Film
- Distributed by: Thim Film; ARC Entertainment
- Release date: September 14, 2013 (Oldenburg International Filmfest)
- Running time: 100 minutes
- Country: Austria
- Language: English

Autumn Blood is a 2013 English-language Austrian thriller drama film directed by Markus Blunder and starring Sophie Lowe.

== Plot ==
A mother and her two children, an older sister and a younger brother, witness a man shoot their husband and father. Traumatized, the boy never speaks again. The children grow up and the girl becomes a beautiful young woman, who attracts the attention of some local men. One day while the girl is swimming alone in a natural spring in the mountains a man appears, he rapes her and she staggers back home. While at their home the boy finds that their mother has died in her bed. A while later the men, an older father, his grown son, and his sons friends, come to the house of the children and one of them rapes the girl again.

Later, they find out a social worker is making inquiries about the girl at the local post office, because the girl has collected welfare instead of her deceased mother. So the men come to the house with rifles, apparently to kill the girl and boy and a hunt begins. During this hunt for the children one of the men falls to his death, another is killed by his friend, then right before the son shoots the girl the father kills his own son. He then offers the girl his rifle to shoot him, but she refuses to do so.

== Cast ==
- Sophie Lowe as The Girl
- Maximilian Harnisch as The Boy
- Peter Stormare as The Mayor
- Samuel Vauramo as The Hunter
- Gustaf Skarsgård as The Butcher
- Tim Morten Uhlenbrock as The Friend
- Annica McCrudden as The Social Worker
- George Lenz as The Clerk
- Nelly Gschwandtner as The Hunter's Wife
- Julia Dietze as The Butcher's Wife
- Hansa Czypionka as The Priest
- Jonas Laux as The Father
- Jacqueline Le Saunier as The Mother
- Hannah Payr as Young Girl
- Elias Köfler as Young Boy
- Margarete Tiesel as Village Woman

== Reception ==
The film received a 20% rating on Rotten Tomatoes. The Village Voice noted that Autumn Blood "hovers between the allegorical and literal" being at the same time "beautiful and brutal, sparse and lush, primal and modern". The review lauded the film for being "engaging, even haunting" because of its "messy flesh-and-blood characters".

=== Accolades ===
Award	Date	Category	Recipient	Result	Ref.
Hollywood Film Awards	2013	Best Narrative Feature	Autumn Blood	Won	
San Diego International Film Festival	2013	Best Narrative Feature	Autumn Blood	Won	
Molins Horror Film Festival	2014	Best Narrative Feature	Autumn Blood	Won	
Molins Horror Film Festival	2014	Best Director	Markus Blunder	Won	
Irvine International Film Festival	2014	Best Cinematography	Reed Morano	Won	
Hamilton Film Festival	2015	Best Actress	Sophie Lowe	Won	
