= Bullets (Finnish TV series) =

Finnish television crime drama series

- Genre: Crime drama
- Created by: Antti Pesonen; Minna Virtanen
- Screenplay by: Minna Virtanen; Matti Laine; Kirsi Vikman
- Directed by: Pete Riski
- Starring: Krista Kosonen; Sibel Kekilli; Tommi Korpela; Dragomir Mrsic
- Country of origin: Finland
- Original languages: Finnish; English; German; Dutch
- No. of seasons: 1
- No. of episodes: 10 (list of episodes)

Production
- Producers: Minna Virtanen; Saara Kankaanpää; Peter Nadermann; Thomas Disch (TV producer); Jan de Clercq; Alan Sim
- Running time: 45 mins. (per episode)
- Production companies: Vertigo Production; Nadcon; Lunanime/Lumiére

Original release
- Network: Elisa Viihde; MTV3; C More
- Release: 19 October – 21 December 2018

Bullets is a Finnish ten-part television crime drama, which premiered on 19 October 2018 on MTV3. It was created by Antti Pesonen and Minna Virtanen with Pete Riski directing. Series rights were sold in over 30 countries, including United Kingdom, Germany and Spain. In Australia Bullets was broadcast on SBS-TV's streaming service, On Demand from 13 June 2019. The action is set in Helsinki (Finland), Belgium and North Caucasus with filming in Finland, Belgium and Georgia. The main protagonists are Mari Saari (Krista Kosonen), an undercover Supo officer and Timo Viita (Tommi Korpela), a narcotics superintendent who investigate the activities of Madina Taburova (Sibel Kekilli), a wanted terrorist, who has arrived in Helsinki as a drug mule. A ruthless criminal, Juri Borodin (Dragomir Mrsic), or "ghost", pursues Madina for his own schemes.

== Plot ==
In 2002, early in the War in Afghanistan, Madina meets Jumanah, joins her "Brides of Allah". They prepare female suicide bombers or "bullets": harmless until loaded and aimed at targets. Madina's husband Aslan was killed by Russians; their daughter, Alba was taken by UN nurses. From 2005 to 2015 Madina travels across Europe, orchestrating numerous terrorist activities using "bullets". In 2016 Madina fakes her death in Paris, two years later in Belgium she becomes "Zamira". However she is forced to be a drug mule by "the Arabian", to get into Finland. In Helsinki both Mari and Timo are watching drugs exchanged by Almaz and Jari. Mari chases Jari but he escapes after killing Jaana. Mari is arrested by Timo as a suspect but he's forced to release her by Juha.

Mari becomes an undercover social worker at Almaz' refugee center. Almaz collects drugs from mules and passes them to Jari. Madina arrives at the center but falls ill when one of her internal packages leaks. Mari saves Madina's life and takes her to hospital. Juri is hunting Madina and follows her trail to Belgium, killing "the Arabian" and his dealers. Karla orders Mari to work with Timo on Jari's drug network. Juri arrives in Helsinki and successively kills Almaz and Jari. Madina is threatened by Juri but she's rescued by Timo and Mari. Timo organises a safe house for Madina, however Juri finds her, blackmails her into cooperation by threatening Alba. Mari starts dating Kim. Madina gets a job as a hotel cleaner. She starts recruiting Roza and Zara. Mari tells Madina she's found Alba and tries to convince her to meet.

Madina is initially scared off by Juri's threats. Roza and Zara start working with Madina at the hotel. Mari sends Alba to Madina, they speak. Juri's henchmen snatch Madina off streets but she escapes. Sayid collects Alba from her home. Madina and Mari arrive. Juri threatens Alba's life and orders Madina to kill Mari. Mari is shot by Madina. Mari injured, defuses a bomb left by Juri. Juri's van with Madina, Alba and Sayid stopped by hotel security. They carry chemical explosives. Leonid and Juri kill security. Russian president has arrived at hotel. Sayid places chemicals on a trolley, which is taken upstairs by Zara. Alba wears fake bomb vest, Leonid wants her shot but Mari shows it's a false detonator. Explosion rips through third floor. Mari rushes upstairs to roof. Sayid's dying, Madina and Juri struggle over his gun. Alba arrives on roof. Juri killed by Mari, Madina dies of wounds. "Interior Minister" decides to lay blame on Madina and not mention connection of Russian agents.

== Cast ==
=== Main cast ===
According to sources:

- Krista Kosonen as an unnamed undercover Finnish Security Intelligence Service ("Supo") officer, her latest alias is "Mari Kristina Saari", a social worker at a refugee center. Previous aliases include "Nina Elina Ojamäki" and "Ulla Enni Kimmonen"
  - Inna Bodson as "girl" (12-year-old "Mari"), an orphan after parents killed in car accident, raised by Karla
- Sibel Kekilli as Madina Taburova, Chechen-born terrorist, poses as "Zamira" a refugee, drug courier. Actually looking for her daughter, Alba
- Tommi Korpela as Timo Viita, Drug Unit's Detective Superintendent, married to Anna, father of Ronja, tries to destroy Jari's drug network, has family problems, eventually separated from Anna
- Dragomir Mrsic as Juri Borodin, former Russian Special Forces commander, intelligence officer, now works for "Oligarch" criminal network, hunts Madina, referred to as "ghost" by Supo and Timo's unit
- Jani Volanen as Jaska Lahti, narcotics officer, Timo's subordinate, generally accedes to Timo's methods
- Leo Honkonen as Vili Porkka, narcotics officer, Timo's subordinate, often criticises Timo's methods
- Adra Al-Aliáyat as Alba Kavén, Kerttu's adoptive teenage daughter, Madina's biological daughter
- Outi Mäenpää as Karla Tuomi, Supo Senior Inspector, Mari's superior, raised Mari
- Nika Savolainen as Zara Egorova, Dagestani woman, Helsinki resident, Konstantin's wife, market stall owner, recruited by Madina
- Jasmin Mora as Roza Mazri, secondary student, bullied by fellow students, recruited by Madina
- Sherwan Haji as Sayid, Juri's henchman, helps organise Helsinki hotel plot
- Koen De Bouw as "Oligarch", Geneva-based businessman, criminal over-lord, Juri's boss

=== Additional cast ===
- Timo Tuominen as Juha Puistola, Helsinki Head of Internal Affairs, previously investigated Timo's squad for misconduct, schemes for advancement
- Milka Ahlroth as Anna Viita, Timo's disgruntled wife, Ronja's mother, later separated from Timo
- Juho Milonoff as Jari Pietani Holma, Timo's former informant, Helsinki drug lord
- Tibo Vandenborre as Leonid Oltsyn, Russian president's chief bodyguard, security consultant, arrives at Helsinki hotel
- Nabil Mallat as "the Arabian" (Mahmoud Hassan), Belgian drug lord, gives Madina new passport, makes her a drug mule
- Lukas de Wolf as Aslan, Chechen resident, Madina's husband, father of Alba
- Dahlia Pessemiers as Jumanah, leader of female terrorists, "Brides of Allah", creates "bullets", recruited and trained Madina
- Sachli Gholamalizad as Zamira Hoxha, North Caucasus-Russian refugee, Belgian-resident
- Oona Airola as Jaana Kulmala, Mari's colleague, undercover at Helsinki airport
- Laura Malmivaara as Kerttu Kavén, Alba's adoptive mother, jewelry shop assistant
- Sampo Sarkola as Kari Kavén, Alba's adoptive father
- Kai Vaine as Kim Ekman, lawyer, Sofia's father
- Sten Karpov as Faisal, Juri's henchman, helps track Madina
- Andrei Tusmak as Konstantin, former journalist, wannabe writer, Zara's abusive husband
- Isabelle van Hecke as "Director of Housekeeping" at Helsinki hotel, hires "Zamira"
- Rober Enckell as "Interior Minister", in charge of all policing matters
- Lilja Kervinen as Ronja Viita, Timo's daughter
- Adna Mohamed as Almaz Kosar Abdi, refugee center nurse, Jari's drug courier
- Gisele Virkkunen as Zaha Mazri, Roza's mother, generally ill, cared for by Roza
- Elina Partrakka as Sofia Ekman, Kim's daughter

== Episode guide ==
No.	Title	Directed by	Written by	Original release date
1	"Refugee"	Pete Riski	Minna Virtanen; Kirsi Vikman	19 October 2018
Afghanistan (2002): Madina meets Jumanah. Helsinki airport (present): Mari and Jaana surveil Almaz and Jari. Vili reports, "he's here", Timo and Jaska spring into action. Almaz gives Jari white bag; they separate. Mari and Jaana chase Jari. Timo and Jaska follow. Jari disappears outside, Mari and Jaana search. Jari rises with gun drawn. Janna calls "gun!" shot fired. Mari cannot save Jaana. Timo and squad arrive; arrest Mari. Belgium: Zamira agrees to be "Arabian"'s drug mule, gives passport but killed. Timo interviews Mari: nothing. Juha orders Mari's release. Belgium: men break into shipping container, find ≈ 20 people: ask for Madina. Timo missed his birthday party: Ronja's annoyed, Anna's resigned. Madina buys Zamira's passport from "Arabian"; works as drug mule. Madina leaves Helsinki airport. Karla: new alias as "Mari", refugee center's social worker. Jaana's corpse anonymously removed. Madina hides passport in room. New flat: Mari knows she's being filmed. At center, Mari sees Madina interviewed by Almaz. Madina sweating. Timo's squad observes Almaz and Mari chatting. Vili and Jaska leave, Timo remains. Juri questions "Arabian" at gunpoint: where's Madina? Juri kills "Arabian". Mari follows Almaz, Madina asks for Alba, collapses. Almaz runs off. Mari saves Madina, boards ambulance. Timo follows.
2	"Courier"	Pete Riski	Minna Virtanen; Kirsi Vikman	26 October 2018
Madina's drug bag leaked, she's critical. Mari returns to center, finds passport. Karla and Mari review Zamira's life: why choose her? Timo sees Madina's guarded room. Mari finds Almaz, updates her on Madina's health. Almaz to Mari: got drugs from refugee mules. Juri leaves Helsinki airport, jammer interrupts CCTV feeds. Drug identified: Syrian amphetamine ("Ammo"). Karla to Mari: work with Timo's squad. Supo and Drug Unit discus joint-operation on "Ammo". Vili and Jaska: Jari took over "Ammo" distribution. Jari visits Almaz: I killed someone; he leaves. Mari attempts facial recognition to ID Madina: no matches. Juri watches Jari exit. Madina recalls Aslan giving her necklace. Karla to Mari: "Arabian" killed Zamira, "ghost" killed "Arabian" plus three henchmen; CCTV jammed, case closed. Mari: what about Madina? Karla: she's mule; let Timo have her. Jaska and Vili at Almaz' flat: she's strangled. Mari's on leave, meets Kim. Refugee center's caller asked for Madina, given Almaz' details. At Almaz' flat, Timo finds money cache. Timo asks Anna: holiday? Anna: cannot afford it. Madina remembers Jumanah preparing woman with bomb vest. Madina wakes, recovers necklace, knocks out guard. Takes gun, phone. Timo to Mari: Almaz killed. Mari to Timo: hospital guard not responding.
3	"Madina"	Pete Riski	Minna Virtanen; Kirsi Vikman	2 November 2018
London (2008): Madina prepares woman's backpack: leave at Waterloo station. Madina observes explosion's aftermath. Present: Madina changed clothes. Mari goes to hospital ward. Timo arrives, walks past "ghost", who looks suspicious. Timo turns around but he's gone. Juri follows Madina, she recognizes him, steals car, gets away. Timo collects Mari, tells her about "ghost". Madina breaks into center, goes to room, Mari awaits. Madina holds gun. Jaska and Vili view hospital's CCTV, disrupted when "ghost" passed Timo. Madina to Mari: drive to your flat, Mari returns passport. Karla phones Mari: "Zamira" = Madina, dangerous terrorist. Mari's building: "ghost" enters, Madina to Mari: answer door; "ghost" waits below, gun raised. Timo sees "ghost", yells "police!" Shots fired, "ghost" runs off. Timo offers Madina police protection, she lowers gun. Karla: maintain cover; determine Madina's mission. Timo to Juha: Madina needs safe house. Anna's disgruntled by Timo's work-focused attitude. Mari reads Madina's file: created "bullets" for terrorism, supposedly died, 2016. Mari and Kim dating. Madina questioned by police: cannot recall drug dealers' names but forced to be mule. Recognizes Almaz but not Jari nor "ghost". Chechnya (2002): Russians attack Madina and Aslan's home. Madina escapes with Alba. Aslan's captured, killed.
4	"Home"	Pete Riski	Minna Virtanen; Kirsi Vikman; Matti Laine	9 November 2018
Mari takes Timo to Supo HQ. Karla to Timo: Madina's true identity is classified. Karla details Madina's history. Timo agrees to treat Madina as drug mule. Mari to find Madina's real mission. Jari sees police tape at Almaz' flat, texts her for details. Mari to Timo: Almaz' phone taken by "ghost"? Almaz: lets meet. Jari shot dead by "ghost". At home, Timo's bags packed, Anna asks him to leave. Ronja to Timo: no one can live with you, go away. Mari relives parents' deaths in car accident. Madina in interview room, camera disrupted, envelope of photos left. Police find Jari's corpse. Madina: will talk to Mari. Madina agrees to police protection. Geneva: "Oligarch" phones Juri, police releasing Madina, mission remains. Mari takes Madina to safe house. Juha to Timo: gather intel on Mari. Timo asks Mari personal questions, she's unsettled. Timo stalks Anna: identifies visitor's numberplate. Mari returns to Supo HQ, views Madina's CCTV, sees image distorted. Mari alerts Vili and Jaska, who enter safe house building, but she stops them when image settles. Inside: Juri blackmails Madina to cooperate by threatening Alba's life. Syria (2016): Madina to Jumanah: time for me to leave, going to Paris to "die".
5	"Alba"	Pete Riski	Minna Virtanen; Kirsi Vikman; Matti Laine	16 November 2018
Belgium (2017): Madina sees young woman crying, holding detonator. Madina calms her, disarms bomb vest, then leaves. Current: Mari and Timo review Madina's footage, envelope appeared after "ghost" visit. Mari enters Madina's flat, copies photos. Jaska and Vili follow Madina. Mari: who's young woman in photos? Timo shares breakfast with Ronja, Anna's stayed out. Timo hides spycam in kitchen. Mari uses facial recognition to ID Alba and adoptive family. Timo checks Almaz' money cache, re-hides it. Mari and Madina discuss news: teenage girl as suicide bomber. Mari: who would do this to children? Madina: I never had any children. Anna finds Timo's money cache. Alba photographed by "ghost" as she leaves school. At jiu-jitsu class, Mari and Alba spar and talk. Anna confronts Timo over cache, orders its removal. Mari meets Kim and Sofia at museum. Timo spies on Anna and Ronja. Alba asks Kerttu about birth mother, but Kerttu knows little. Mari and Madina dine. Alba searches parents' room finds baby shawl. Madina to Mari: lost daughter in 2002. Middle East (2017): Madina tracked down by "ghost". He tells her: Alba's alive in Helsinki, get ready to work for us. She shoots him in chest, runs off, he wears bulletproof vest.
6	"Zara"	Pete Riski	Minna Virtanen; Kirsi Vikman; Matti Laine	23 November 2018
Karla to Mari: stay clear of Alba. Juri to Madina: go to job interview or risk Alba's safety. Gives Madina vial of clear liquid: get rid of Mari; also a parcel. Mari sees her flat's been broken in. Kim arrives; found by her phone number, they have sex. Mari searches Kim's wallet, asks for ID check. Madina in hotel, instructed in cleaner's duties. Juha questions Mari, shows previous IDs, who are you? Mari: Juha's unauthorized. Mari's CCTV disrupted. Madina watches Roza bullied at school. Timo to Karla: Madina's hotel job. Karla: search Madina's flat. Jaska finds annotated Quran, photographs notes. Madina starts recruiting Roza. Mari to Timo: Madina's radicalizing Roza. Vili tails Madina to market, he photographs her with Zara. Juha questions Timo over Supo work. Timo at Supo HQ: Juha investigating Janna's death, Mari's negligence. He's seeking career advancement. Madina gives Zara her Quran: read marked pages. Mari follows Zara. Konstantin annoys Zara, and then beats her. Mari bangs on door. Mari to Timo: Konstantin's wife beater. Zara reads Quran. Mari and Timo: get Madina to meet Alba? At Madina's, Mari visits. Madina prepares tea cups; adds vial content to Mari's cup. Mari: I found Alba. Madina drops cups.
7	"Ghost"	Pete Riski	Minna Virtanen; Kirsi Vikman	30 November 2018
Helsinki (2016): Timo cleared of misconduct and threatening suspect. Juha disappointed. Timo has heart attack. Present: Mari sees Timo's spycam on Ronja, she tells him Ronja will learn she's being photographed by him; remove it. Madina to Juri: we can use Mari to fool police. Juri: agrees but continue recruiting Roza and Zara. Timo visits Anna and Ronja, Anna gives him divorce papers: she will not discuss relationship, he's had too many chances already. Madina meets Roza and Zara: offers hotel cleaner job. Zara accepts, but Roza hesitates. Timo removes spycam from kitchen. Timo visits Juha for drinks: Anna wants divorce. Later Anna to Juha: does he know about our affair? Konstantin takes Zara's Quran, denigrates her faith. Karla agrees to Timo and Mari's plan for Madina and Alba meeting. It may flush out "ghost". Mari and Alba spar at jiu-jitsu. Mari: your mother's alive, wants to meet. Mari and Madina go to school for meet up, Juri follows. At school, Timo and team watch, Alba arrives, Madina stays in car. Mari talks to Alba, returns to car but Madina refuses. Jari observes Alba waiting. Alba arrives home, distraught. Mari takes Madina home: Zara arrives, Konstantin's beaten her up.
8	"Birthday"	Pete Riski	Minna Virtanen; Kirsi Vikman	7 December 2018
Juri watches Kerttu console Alba. Mari takes Madina to Zara's. Madina enters, stands on Konstantin's neck until he dies; collects Zara's things. Roza to Zaha: taking hotel cleaner job. Juri signals helicopter: three henchmen disembark. Mari to Karla, Timo: Konstantin's corpse disposed. Timo and team: unhappy covering murder. Mari: if Madina's arrested, cell continues mission. Karla agrees: need information on cell members. Karla to Mari: dangerous seeing Kim. Madina orders bomb-making material via Zara's laptop, pays by Zara's card. Juri observes Mari meet Kim. Karla to Juha: leave Mari alone, photos of Juha with Anna. Madina goes to Roza's bedroom, places Quran. Jaska photographs Madina leaving. Juri's henchman: Mari's ID appears genuine. Madina photographs floor plans. Ronja cannot abide Juha visiting. Karla to Mari: extensive search of your background, by "ghost". Mari: send Alba to Madina? Timo buries money cache. Anna to Juha: Timo had money bag. Madina refuses to contact Alba. Juha to Vili: Timo stole evidence. At jiu-jitsu, Mari to Alba: Madina's address. Alba goes to Madina's, Alba realizes it is Madina's goodbye. Juri observes meeting. At hotel, Leonid announces important visitor imminent. On way to Sofia's birthday, Mari's attacked, she stabs Juri's henchman with his knife.
9	"Roza"	Pete Riski	Minna Virtanen; Kirsi Vikman	14 December 2018
Madina to Kerttu: jewelry for my daughter, but Madina leaves without chosen necklace. Henchman not IDed, has Russian Special Forces tattoos. Madina snatched off streets. Doctor to Timo: another heart attack likely; leave police. Karla to Mari: Madina's missing. Zaha to Roza: Quran notes are false, dangerous. Vili to Timo: Juha says you stole evidence. Juri to Madina: why meet Alba? Roza's SMS: I quit. Juri releases Madina: fix it. Madina to Roza: lets meet. Juri sends Faisal instead, tells Sayid to imprison Madina. Timo and Jaska dig up money cache. Madina breaks bindings with screw. Timo at Ronja's dance practice apologizes, will miss tomorrow's recital. Ronja: you know mom's boyfriend. Sayid checks Madina: knocked out, takes gun, phone. Madina phones Mari: help. Mari collects Madina, Alba in danger. Kerttu gives Alba necklace; chosen by her birth mother. Timo sees Anna and Juha together. Karla phones Timo: check on Roza. At Roza's, police dead, Faisal enters, grabs Roza. Timo saves her, chases Faisal but out of condition. Madina and Mari at Alba's, Sayid takes Alba. Timo fights Juha over Anna. Madina and Mari arrive at room, Juri awaits. Sayid holds Alba. Juri orders Madina to kill Mari, Madina shoots Mari.
10	"Mari Saari"	Pete Riski	Minna Virtanen; Kirsi Vikman	21 December 2018
Mari's injured, near bomb set to go. Juri in van, presses button. Mari defuses bomb. Timo in hospital; Juha: prison for stealing evidence. Timo: evidence logged in. Madina to Zara: come to work. Madina, Juri, Alba and Sayid in van. Stopped due to "cleaning products". Leonid overrides hotel security, but refused entry. Leonid and Juri kill them. Russian president arrives at hotel. Zara wearing cleaner's uniform enters hotel. Sayid sets timer for chemical bomb on trolley. Juri to Madina: say goodbye to Alba. Sayid pushes trolley into basement. Madina to Alba: Aslan's necklace. Zara takes trolley upstairs. Alba wears bomb vest. Leonid orders Alba shot. Mari denies him: fake detonator. Juri to Madina: I killed Aslan. Sayid: president in kill zone. Juri starts timer. Madina lunges for Juri's gun. Explosion destroys third floor. Mari runs upstairs: continues to roof. Sayid's dying, Madina's wounded: holds gun on Juri. Mari: Alba's alive. Madina winces, Juri attacks. Mari shoots Juri dead. Alba witnesses Madina dying. Month later: Mari addresses "Interior Minister", outlines Juri's plot, highly organized with intelligence agents. Juha counters: better to blame Madina. Minister: to appease Russians, stick with Juha's version. Leonid reports to "Oligarch". Karla: president wanted to meet secret daughter.

== Reception ==
Dimitris Passas of Tap the Line observed Bullets strives, "to show how difficult is to judge its characters who are repeatedly making questionable, in terms of ethics and morality, decisions because of extreme circumstances." SBS-TV's Anthony Morris described the pivotal interaction between lead characters, Mari (Kosonen) and Madina (Kekilli), and explained, "[it's] about the connection between the two women as it is about the plot twists and turns you'd expect from a spy drama." TV Tonight's David Knox felt, "[this is] an intelligent mix of crime serial, espionage thriller, and political drama, set against the atmospheric backdrops."
