= The Hustlers =

- Film poster
- Finnish: Veijarit
- Directed by: Lauri Nurkse
- Starring: Mikko Leppilampi; Antti Luusuaniemi
- Release date: 25 December 2010
- Running time: 85 minutes
- Country: Finland
- Language: Finnish

The Hustlers (Finnish: Veijarit) is a 2010 Finnish comedy film directed by Lauri Nurkse.

== Cast ==
- Mikko Leppilampi as Saku
- Antti Luusuaniemi as Ässä
- Pihla Viitala as Anna
- Hennariikka Laaksola as Vilma
- Malla Malmivaara as Rita
- Ville Tiihonen as Alex
- Leo Honkonen as Stefu
- Eero Ritala as Panu
