= Reykjavik Whale Watching Massacre =

- Promotional poster
- Directed by: Júlíus Kemp
- Written by: Sjón Sigurdsson
- Produced by: Mike Downey; Gísli Gíslason; Sam Taylor; Ingvar Þórðarson
- Starring: Gunnar Hansen; Pihla Viitala; Nae Yuuki; Helgi Björnsson
- Cinematography: Jean-Noël Mustonen
- Edited by: Sigurbjörg Jónsdóttir
- Music by: Hilmar Örn Hilmarsson
- Distributed by: Kisi Productions
- Release date: 2 September 2009 (Iceland)
- Country: Iceland
- Languages: Icelandic; English

Reykjavik Whale Watching Massacre is a 2009 Icelandic comedy-horror film directed by Júlíus Kemp and written by Sjón Sigurdsson.

== Premise ==
Tourists in Iceland on a whale watching expedition off the coast of Reykjavík are stranded when their ship breaks down, but are rescued by a nearby whaling ship crewed by "fishbillies" who are not as friendly as they first seem.

== Cast ==
- Pihla Viitala as Annette
- Nae Yuuki as Endo
- Terence Anderson as Leon
- Miranda Hennessy as Marie-Anne
- Helgi Björnsson as Tryggvi
- Guðrún Gísladóttir as Mamma
- Stefán Jónsson as Siggi
- Aymen Hamdouchi as Jean Francois
- Snorri Engilbertsson as Anton
- Gunnar Hansen as Captain Pétur
- Thor Kristjansson as Björn
- Ragnhildur Steinunn Jónsdóttir as Hannah Traschle
- Carlos Takeshi as Nobuyoshi
- Halldóra Geirharðsdóttir as Helga
- Hanna María Karlsdóttir as Signý
- Björn Nygårds Kers as Captured Bird Watcher

== Release ==
The film was released in Icelandic cinemas in September 2009. Due to the lack of Icelandic horror films and the film's grindhouse feel, many audience members could not take it seriously and mistakenly thought it was unintentionally funny as opposed to purposely comedic; advertisements that started with the words "the first Icelandic thriller" were removed in favour of new advertisements stating that the film "should only be seen if you have a sense of humor". E1 Entertainment picked up distribution rights for the UK, where the film was released on 10 May 2010 as Harpoon: The Reykjavik Whale Watching Massacre.
