= Red Sky (2011 film) =

2011 film

- Film poster
- Directed by: Laya Yourgou
- Written by: Laya Yourgou
- Produced by: Laya Yourgou
- Starring: Apostolis Totsikas
- Cinematography: Tassos Zafiropoulos
- Release date: 7 April 2011
- Running time: 90 minutes
- Country: Greece
- Language: Greek

Red Sky (Greek: Κόκκινος Ουρανός, translit. Kokkinos ouranos) is a 2011 Greek drama film directed by Laya Yourgou.

== Cast ==
- Apostolis Totsikas
- Orfeas Avgoustidis
- Pihla Viitala
- Efstathia Tsapareli
- Laertis Vasiliou
- Altin Huta
- Angeliki Lemoni
- Argiris Thanasoulas
- Adonis Vlisidis
