= M/S Romantic =

- Genre: Black comedy Drama
- Created by: Jani Volanen; Tommi Korpela
- Written by: Jani Volanen; Tommi Korpela
- Directed by: Jani Volanen
- Starring: Hannu-Pekka Björkman; Anna Paavilainen; Antti Luusuaniemi; Antti Tuomas Heikkinen; Annika Aapalahti; Sami Ahonen; Lotta Kaihua; Joel Hirvonen; Santeri Kinnunen; Iivo Tuuri; Vilma Sippola; Amos Brotherus; Tommi Korpela; Petteri Pennilä; Pirjo Lonka; Elena Leeve; Miila Virtanen; Anna-Sofia Tuominen; Tomi Salmela; Milla Palin
- Country of origin: Finland
- No. of seasons: 1
- No. of episodes: 4

Production
- Producers: Marko Talli; Olli Haikka
- Cinematography: Teppo Högman
- Editor: Jussi Rautaniemi
- Running time: 59–73 minutes
- Production company: Yellow Film & TV

Original release
- Network: Yle TV1; Yle Areena
- Release: 24 February – 17 March 2019

M/S Romantic is a Finnish four-part black comedy miniseries created by Jani Volanen and Tommi Korpela. Volanen directed the series alone. M/S Romantic depicts one day aboard a cruise ship traveling between Helsinki and Stockholm. The series aired on Yle TV1 from 24 February to 17 March 2019, and all episodes were simultaneously released on the streaming service Yle Areena on 24 February.

The first episode was watched by 574,000 people on television and had over 350,000 views on Yle Areena by 6 March 2019. M/S Romantic won the 2019 Golden Venla for Best Drama Series. Additionally, Volanen received the Best Director Venla, Volanen and Korpela jointly won Best Writer Venlas, and Hannu-Pekka Björkman was awarded Best Actor.

The series' budget was €1,221,058, of which €100,000 was funded by the Finnish Film Foundation.

== Cast ==
- Hannu-Pekka Björkman as Jocke, cruise director
- Anna Paavilainen as Jenna
- Antti Luusuaniemi as Kaide
- Antti Tuomas Heikkinen as Emppu
- Annika Aapalahti as Pike
- Sami Ahonen as Jamo
- Lotta Kaihua as Elena
- Joel Hirvonen as Nipa
- Santeri Kinnunen as Veli Kallio
- Iivo Tuuri as Samu
- Vilma Sippola as Annika
- Amos Brotherus as Kaapo
- Tommi Korpela as Gusu
- Petteri Pennilä as Matias

== Episodes ==
No.	Title	Directed by	Written by	Original release date
1	"Kahdet häät ja yhdet varpajaiset"	Jani Volanen	Jani Volanen and Tommi Korpela	24 February 2019
The cruise director Joakim "Jocke" Stenroos has returned to work prematurely after the birth of his fourth child. He is frustrated as Jenna, who was in charge when he was away, has in his opinion ran the ship poorly, like letting a man with several dogs on board. Jocke deals with the famous singer Gusu who has accidentally been placed in a small cabin. Bachelor friends Kaide and Emppu are hunting for one-night stands. Kaide regards himself a seasoned "player" and takes it upon himself to teach Emppu. As newlyweds Pike and Jamo are boarding the ship, Jamo trips and injures his legs. Their tensions worsen when they discover that the cruise is hosting another wedding as well, a Finnish-Swedish couple. The pair deals with the wedding coordinator Nipa's poor planning in various matters. Eventually, Nipa has a racist breakdown and physically attacks a member of the other wedding party, who takes him down. As Jamo is dealing with his foot, Pike leaves him to go to the disco, as she thinks he isn't taking the wedding seriously. Gusu approaches Pike and seduces her, eventually getting her to go to his cabin, where he gives her alcohol and licks her leg.
2	"Meidän poikamme merellä"	Jani Volanen	Jani Volanen and Tommi Korpela	3 March 2019
Jocke deals with a sexually provocative band that he deems inappropriate for children, as well as cynical pub troubadour Mike. He asks Gusu to perform a classic song of his, which he is reluctant to do. Veli Kallio is taking his six-year-old nephew Samu on a "men's trip", but Veli encounters a like-minded group onboard that he befriends. Samu buys a souvenir for his mom but loses it while playing on the deck. Veli starts increasingly neglecting Samu, opting rather to drink with his friends at the bar. Eventually Samu starts crying and Veli takes him to their cabin. Once Samu falls asleep, Veli leaves for to the bar. Samu wakes up to loud noises from an adjacent cabin. Finding the cabin empty, he takes off into the night.
3	"Koirien yö"	Jani Volanen	Jani Volanen and Tommi Korpela	10 March 2019
A Japanese man seems to threaten the dog owner. Panicked, the dog owner seeks out Jocke, who locks him with his dogs in the ship jail. After members from the Finnish wedding party try to push Jocke into a pool, he has a breakdown in his cabin. Annika performs at a talent show, but comes in third. After a confrontation with her family, she runs off. Kaapo, a young passenger whose family is traveling with Annika's, follows her. Annika gets alcohol from a drunk man (Matias), and Annika and Kaapo drink in a random vehicle in the car deck. Despite Kaide's off-putting behaviour, Emppu manages to arrange a meeting with other women at the disco. Emppu has a worsening eye infection, but Kaide convinces him to go to the disco. Emppu connects with one of the women, but Kaide goes on a racist rant, putting everyone off. Following a confrontation with Emppu, a dejected Kaide abandons the group and climbs over the deck railing, hanging over the water. Veli departs back to his cabin, but gets sidetracked into a cabin with strangers drinking. Unable to find Veli at the bar, Samu ventures onto the deck alone.
4	"Pimeyden ytimessä"	Jani Volanen	Jani Volanen and Tommi Korpela	17 March 2019
Jocke reluctantly agrees to let a helicopter land on the ship. Matias enters a speed dating event. He's enamoured with Eeva. Matias consistently fails to pick up on Eeva's hints that she's not interested. Her friend eventually lashes out at him for not leaving them alone. Matias cries alone at his cabin and drinks. Annika seeks out a man named Ricardo, who has alcohol for Annika and Kaapo. When Annika and Ricardo make out in his cabin, Kaapo storms off. Annika and Kaapo end up on the deck of the ship. Annika asks Kaapo to jump off and swim to a nearby island with her. The two kiss, but they run inside after seeing an animal on deck. Jocke complains to the ship captain Janne about Jenna. Janne dismisses Jocke's complaints and orders him to go home tomorrow, but orders the two to deal with the lockdown of the ship as there was an animal spotted on deck. When the ship loses power, Annika is reunited with her parents. Pike leaves Gusu and joins Jamo at their cabin. Jocke calms the crowd with a song with his guitar before the power returns. The ship doctor tends to Matias after he injures himself on deck. Jenna takes an intoxicated Veli to his cabin, where Samu awaits, having found the souvenir on the deck. Kaide encounters the two women, who tell him that Emppu was taken to the hospital with a helicopter due to his infected eyes. Gusu decides to perform a classic.

== Reception ==
Helsingin Sanomat's Laura Kytölä praised the series for capturing Finnishness with dark undertones, comparing it to Jani Volanen's earlier works, Ihmebantu (2009) and Häiriötekijä (2013, 2015). She commended the series' weaving of six storylines into a cohesive narrative.

== Awards ==
- Golden Venla: Best Drama Series 2020
- Best Director Venla
- Best Writer Venla
- Best Actor (Hannu-Pekka Björkman)
