= Anna Rogel =

Anna Rågel or Anna Rogel (4 December 1751 in Merikarvia – 5 July 1784) was a Finnish preacher. She is regarded as the most notable woman within the religious revival movement in Satakunta and Ostrobothnia during the 18th century. She was also among the first "sleeping preachers" in Finland.

After having become sick and bedridden in 1770, Anna Rogel became famous for, during unconsciousness, singing and massing in her bed. She claimed to have no recollection of it afterward. She became the target of thousands of pilgrimages, and the sleeptalk preachers spread along the coasts of Gulf of Bothnia in both Finland and Sweden. She was for a period kept at the house of the merchant Johan Blad in Vaasa.

A monument was raised over her in 1870.

== Sources ==
- "Rågel, Anna, in Biofragiskt lxikon för Finland (Biographical Encyclopedia for Finland (BFL))".
