= Hiljaisuus =

- Film poster
- Directed by: Sakari Kirjavainen
- Written by: Esko Salervo
- Produced by: Joonas Berghäll
- Starring: Joonas Saartamo; Joanna Haartti; Lauri Tilkanen; Terhi Suorlahti; Ilkka Heiskanen; Sinikka Mokkila; Kari Hakala
- Production company: Cine Works Koskinen Rossi
- Distributed by: Buena Vista International
- Release date: 9 December 2011
- Country: Finland
- Language: Finnish
- Budget: €1,500,198

Hiljaisuus (English: Silence) is a 2011 Finnish war docudrama film directed by Sakari Kirjavainen and set in winter and spring 1944, near the end of the Continuation War.

== Plot ==
Starring Finnish actors Joonas Saartamo, Joanna Haartti, Lauri Tilkanen, Terhi Suorlahti, Ilkka Heiskanen, Sinikka Mokkila and Kari Hakala, the film details the life and times of the members of a specialized Finnish army unit, commanded by a priest, whose difficult and dangerous assignment is to recover dead soldiers from the front lines, prepare their often frozen bodies for burial, and deliver them to their hometowns and families for funeral and burial. The film covers the daily lives, romances, and intrigues of the soldiers and their civilian female helpers attached to the unit, including the extreme dangers connected with their jobs. Near the end of the film, the unit's field morgue is about to be overrun; and the soldiers must take quick action to save their own lives and evacuate the growing collection of dead soldiers the unit are preparing for their final resting places.

== Reviews ==
Tuomas Riskala writes in Iltalehti, "Lauri Tilkanen and Joonas Saartamo do an impressive job in the lead roles" and "Director Sakari Kirjavainen and screenwriter Esko Salervo have created an intimate depiction of the war and the state of mind between life and death..." Outi Heiskanen of Skenet opines, "The actors deserve all possible superlatives" and "Few films manage to create so strong and touching an atmosphere without falling victim to melodramatic excesses."

== Awards ==
The film was nominated for seven 2012 Jussi Awards, Finland's premier motion picture accolade; and won four: Joonas Saartamo, Paras miespääosa (Best Actor); Ilkka Heiskanen, Paras miessivuosa (Best Supporting Actor); Olli Huhtanen and Pietari Koskinen, Paras äänisuunnittelu (Best Sound Design); and Timo Hietala, Paras musiikki (Best Music).
