= An Eye for an Eye (1999 film) =

- Original Finnish film poster
- Finnish: Silmä silmästä
- Directed by: Atro Lahtela
- Written by: Atro Lahtela
- Produced by: Johannes Lassila
- Starring: Meri Nenonen; Jani Volanen; Jukka-Pekka Palo
- Cinematography: Tahvo Hirvonen
- Edited by: Kimmo Taavila
- Music by: Pekka Karjalainen
- Production companies: Talent House; Matila Röhr Productions
- Distributed by: Cinema Mondo
- Release date: 1 October 1999
- Running time: 76 min
- Country: Finland
- Language: Finnish

An Eye for an Eye (Finnish: Silmä silmästä) is a 1999 Finnish horror drama film written and directed by Atro Lahtela. It tells the story of a woman, who is haunted by nightmares, and who returns to her old home village, finding out about the secret past of both the village and her dead father. The film's actors include Meri Nenonen, Jukka-Pekka Palo, Johanna af Schultén and double role made Jani Volanen.

The film's production costs were more than FIM 1.8 million. The film has been screened at the Helsinki International Film Festival in 1999 and at the Puchon International Fantastic Film Festival in South Korea in 2000.

== Premise ==
Two sisters, Kiia and Eija, have moved away from the village of Pirunperä in Kainuu after their father's suicide. Kiia has become a sculptor and is plagued by nightmares related to her old home village, while her sister Eija has created a career as a flight attendant. Kiia returns to her former home to make sculptures for the local church. At the same time, she finds out the secret past of her father and home village, because the sculptures by Kiia seems to evoke the indescribable evil that slept in Pirunperä.

== Cast ==
- Meri Nenonen as Kiia Saari
  - Ronja Kåhre as Young Kiia
- Jani Volanen as Priest Sulo Salo / Kalevi Salo, Sulo's father
  - Walter Gröhn as Young Sulo
- Jukka-Pekka Palo as Martti Saari, Kiia's Eija's father
- Ari Piispa as Kai-Petteri "Koo-Pee" Korppi
- Ulla Uotinen as Maria Korppi
- Heidi Kiviharju as Sari Salo, Sulo's sister
- Inga-Liisa Laukka as Grandma Martta
- Johanna af Schultén as Eija Saari
  - Nicole Henriksson as Young Eija
- Eeva-Liisa Haimelin as Siiri
- Jouko Puolanto as gallerist
- Jukka-Pekka Mikkonen as intellectual in the gallery

== Reception ==
When the film was released, it received mixed reviews. Helena Ylänen, a critic of Helsingin Sanomat, wrote on October 1, 1999, that "the film has been clearly inspired by Finnish madness with its liquor vapors, unpaved roads, fire frosts, hanging loops, religious charms and covert lusts."

In the Gorehound magazine 2/1999, Tuomas Riskala gave value to the choice of theme, but found the object of criticism: "There are, however, moments in the film during which one remembers which genre should be; for example, the memory bundles and flashes of the subconscious experienced by Kiia are successful. At times, however, it seems that director Atro Lahtela has not wanted to create any overly original horror aesthetic."

On October 1, 1999, Tarmo Poussu gave recognition in Ilta-Sanomat for acting work and also for the fact that "Lahtela's pictorial narrative is flexible and he describes the work of a sculptor in an interesting way, for example". But the criticism was just as harsh: "In the main, however, he fails. The supernatural episodes of the film are outdated by their means, roughly underlined and amusing in their effect."
