= Helena Konttinen =

Finnish prophet (1871–1916)

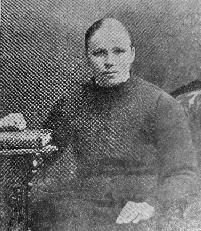
Helena Konttinen.

Helena Konttinen (18 June 1871 in Uukuniemi (today's Parikkala and part of Russia), Finland – 24 April 1916 in Uukuniemi, Finland) was a Finnish Christian prophet, a "sleeping preacher", whose religious activities were between the years 1893 and 1916, mostly located at Uukuniemi. Konttinen was married and she had four children.

Konttinen's activity resulted in revivalism called "uukuniemiläisyys".

== Biography and career ==
Helena Konttinen was a modest, uneducated peasant woman from Uukuniemi who was unable to write. She lived an extremely poor life with her husband taking care of his closest relatives. Konttinen had always been religious and belonged to the Lutheran Church like many other Finnish people during those years. In 1905, at age 34, she became a sleeping preacher claiming to be a prophet of God. Konttinen, when falling into a trance, was telling people that what she experienced were divine truths and soon gained authority as a channel of heavenly powers. According to the pastor, K. Sarlin, Helena Konttinen was a mouthpiece of God. Sarlin collected her talks and recollections in the book A Prophet of Our Times which had been published in 1916, the same year of Konttinen death.

== Literature ==
- Aarni Voipio: Sleeping Preachers: a Study in Ecstatic Religiosity, Helsinki, 1951.
