= Bad Family (film) =

- Promotional poster
- Finnish: Paha perhe
- Directed by: Aleksi Salmenperä
- Written by: Aleksi Salmenperä
- Produced by: Aki Kaurismäki
- Starring: Ville Virtanen; Lauri Tilkanen; Pihla Viitala; Vera Kiiskinen
- Cinematography: Tuomo Hutri
- Edited by: Samu Heikkilä
- Music by: Ville Tanttu
- Distributed by: Sandrew Metronome
- Release date: 29 January 2010
- Running time: 95 minutes
- Country: Finland
- Language: Finnish
- Budget: €1.6 million

Bad Family (Finnish: Paha perhe) is a 2010 Finnish drama film written and directed by Aleksi Salmenperä and produced by Aki Kaurismäki. The film tells the story of an overly protective and controlling father who suspects incest is taking place between his own son and daughter. These growing suspicions and concerns cause the father to become delusional and unrelenting in his quest to end the love affair between his children.

Distributed domestically by Sandrew Metronome, Bad Family was theatrically released in Finland on 29 January 2010. From 14 to 21 February 2010 it was screened at the 60th Berlin International Film Festival.

== Plot ==
After a divorce a father, Mikael Lindgren, raises his son, Daniel, on his own. His ex-wife, Laura, has custody over his daughter, Tilda. When Laura dies, Daniel and Tilda finally meet again.

== Cast ==
- Ville Virtanen — Mikael Lindberg
- Lauri Tilkanen — Daniel
- Pihla Viitala — Tilda
- Vera Kiiskinen — Laura
- Niki Seppälä — Milo
- Ismo Kallio — Jaan

== Critical response ==
In a review of the film, Jonathan Romney of Screen Daily called Salmenperä's storyline a "confident study of family trauma" and proclaimed the film "a compelling, sometimes darkly witty drama." Alissa Simon of Variety magazine stated that Bad Family has a "perversely fascinating start" after which the "darkly comic psychodrama goes plain psycho". She commended the "serious thesping by the three principals" for suggesting "psychological depth" but concluded that "the script eventually leaves them high and dry" and that "[Bad Family] loses its way at the midpoint, becoming a tonal roller-coaster that skitters to a stop."

== See also ==
- 2010 in film
- Cinema of Finland
- List of Finnish films: 2000s
- Genetic sexual attraction
