= Noah Troyer =

Amish Mennonite preacher (1831–1886)

- Born: February 18, 1831; Ohio
- Died: March 2, 1886
- Known for: Preaching in a trance
- Spouse: Fannie Mast
- Children: 6

Noah Troyer (February 18, 1831 - March 2, 1886), was an Amish Mennonite farmer and "sleeping preacher," who preached while in a state of trance.

Noah Troyer was born in Ohio in 1831. He married Fannie Mast, a resident of Holmes County, Ohio, and they had six children together. In 1875, they moved to Johnson County, Iowa, and bought a 160-acre farm there, three miles north of Kalona in Washington County, Iowa - which immediately adjoins Iowa County, where the Amana Colonies are situated.

At that time, the Amana Colonies were the main American settlement of the religious community of the Inspirationalists, also known as the "Community of True Inspiration," who had brought trance preaching to North America.

In 1878 he started to preach at some length in an unconscious state at the Amish Church. He continued in this manner of preaching and became known as a "sleeping preacher."

An article of the Herald of Truth reported on May 15, 1882, that he had preached with John D. Kauffman (1847-1913), another Amish "sleeping preacher." Troyer had spoken first, followed by Kauffman, and each spoke for about two hours.

On the morning of March 2, 1886, Troyer died in a hunting accident.

== Literature ==
- Noah Troyer: Sermons Delivered While in an Unconscious State : With a Brief Biographical Sketch of His Life, Iowa City, Iowa, 1879.
- Noah Troyer: Sermons Delivered by Noah Troyer, a Member of the Amish Mennonite Church, of Johnson County, Iowa, while in an Unconscious State. Second Book. Containing Six Sermons not before Published, together with Several Articles from Other Writers, Elkhart, Indiana, 1880, 103 pages.
- Steven Dale Reschly: The Amish on the Iowa prairie, 1840-1910, Baltimore and London, 2000, 268 pages. (One Chapter of 24 pages "Sleeping Preacher Strains" mainly on Noah Troyer)
- Harry H. Hiller: The Sleeping Preacher: An Historical Study of the Role of Charisma in Amish Society in Pennsylvania Folklife 18 (Winter 1968/69), pages 19-31.
- Phoebe A. Brubaker: Possession Trance and Plain Coats: The Lives, Times, and Trances of Amish Mennonite "Sleeping" Preachers Noah Troyer and John D. Kauffman, 1878-1920, manuscript at Mennonite Historical Library (Goshen College), History Senior Seminar, 2003, 194 pages.
- Becky Guengerich: Biography of a sleeping preacher, Noah Troyer, manuscript at Mennonite Historical Library (Goshen College), Horsch History Essay Contest paper, 1968, 8 pages.
