= Aleksi Salmenperä =

Finnish film director (born 1973)

- Born: 1973 (age 52–53); Helsinki, Finland
- Occupations: Film director, screenwriter
- Years active: 1998-present

Aleksi Salmenperä (born 1973 in Helsinki) is a Finnish film director. He is a graduate of the University of Art and Design Helsinki; among his films are 2004's Producing Adults, 2007's A Man's Work and 2010 Bad Family. A Man's Work was entered into the 29th Moscow International Film Festival.

== Filmography ==
- Rajatapaus (1998)
- Onnenpeli 2001 (short film, 2001)
- Producing Adults (Finnish: Lapsia ja aikuisia) (2004)
- A Man's Work (Finnish: Miehen työ) (2007)
- Posse (short film, 2009)
- Bad Family (Finnish: Paha perhe) (2010)
- Alcan Highway (2013)
- Häiriötekijä (2015)
- Jättiläinen (2016)
- Tyhjiö (2018)
