= Petja Peltomaa =

Finnish screenwriter

Petja Peltomaa (born 1971 in Ylöjärvi) is a Finnish screenwriter who has created tv-series Nurses (Syke) and music entertainment show The Song of my life (Elämäni biisi)

Peltomaa graduated with master's degree from the Department of Film Studies from University of Art and Design.

Peltomaa was Finlands Screenwriters's guild's chairwoman in 2013 and 2014. In 2015 the guild awarded Peltomaa as the screenwriter of the year.

Peltomaa co-wrote television series Kimmo with Tommi Liski for which they received Venla-award for best writing in 2013. Peltomaa has also been nominated for best writing in years 2014, 2015 and 2016 for television drama series Nurses.

Peltomaa lives in Helsinki. She has two daughters.

== Selected filmography and TV credits ==
- Käenpesä (2004)
- Tukka auki (2008) – Head writer
- Pihalla (2009) – Co-written with Sanna Reinumäki
- Parasta aikaa (2009) – Head writer
- Vastaparit (2010) – Head writer
- Kimmo (2012) – Co-written with Tommi Liski
- Kerran viikossa (2013) – Head writer
- Syke (2014–) – Head writer
