= Jani Volanen =

Finnish actor, writer and director (born 1971)

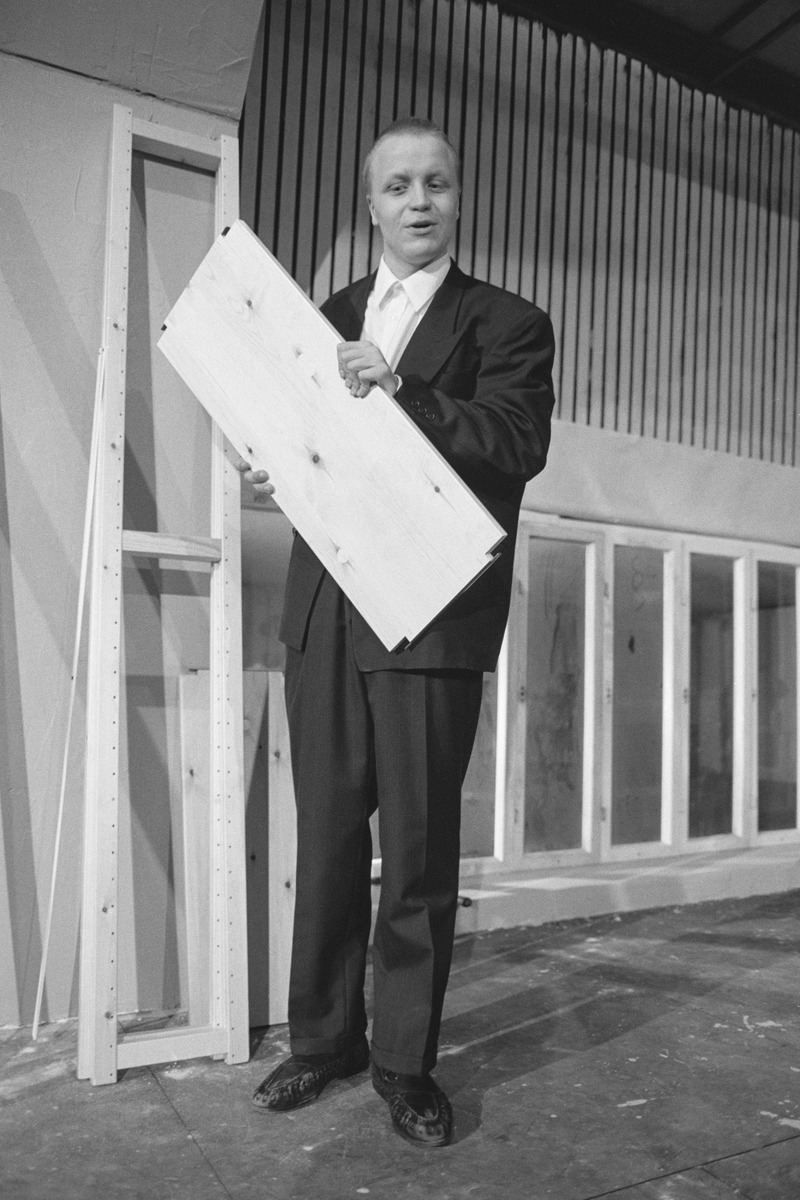
- Jani Volanen in 1993
- Born: Jani Kristian Volanen; 1 November 1971 (age 53); Helsinki, Finland
- Occupations: Actor; writer; director
- Years active: 1986–present
- Notable work: M/S Romantic; Summer of Sorrow

Jani Kristian Volanen (born 1 November 1971) is a Finnish actor, writer and director.

== Biography ==
Born in Helsinki, he has appeared in more than fifty TV and movie productions and thirty professional theater productions since 1986. Volanen has also created and directed many comedy shows for Finnish television. Volanen often plays characters with personality disorders. He is a member of the comedy group Julmahuvi.

Volanen has won the Jussi Award for Best Supporting Actor twice for his roles in the films A Man's Work (2007) and The Mine (Jättiläinen, 2016). In 2020, he wrote and starred in the short film The Bouncer (Poke) that won the 2021 Jussi Award for Best Short Film. Volanen won the Golden Venlas for Best Director, Best Screenplay and Best Drama Series for M/S Romantic in 2020 and for Summer of Sorrow (Munkkivuori) in 2023.

== Filmography ==
=== Actor ===
Film performances
Year	Title	Role	Notes
1999	An Eye for an Eye (Silmä silmästä)	Sulo Salo, Kalevi Salo	
2006	Matti: Hell Is for Heroes (Matti)	Nipa	
2006	Saippuaprinssi	Director	
2007	A Man's Work (Miehen työ)	Olli, Juha's friend	Won the 2008 Jussi Award for Best Supporting Actor
2009	Forbidden Fruit (Kielletty hedelmä)	Ilari	
2012	Love and Other Troubles (Hulluna Saraan)	Eikka	
2014	Schönefeld Boulevard	Leif	
2016	The Mine (Jättiläinen)	Pekka Perä	Won the 2017 Jussi Award for Best Supporting Actor
2018	Deadwind (Karppi)	Usko Bergdahl	
2019	Dogs Don't Wear Pants (Koirat eivät käytä housuja)	Pauli	
2020	The Bouncer (Poke)	Nightclub bouncer	Short film, also writer
2022	Hatching (Pahanhautoja)	Father	

Television performances
Year	Title	Role	Notes
2007–2013	Jefferson Anderson (Pasila)	Kyösti Pöysti	Animated series (voice role), 64 episodes
2018	Bullets	Jaska Lahti	10 episodes

=== Director and/or writer ===
Film
Year	Title	Director	Writer	Notes
2002	Rumble	Yes	Yes	
2015	Distractions (Häiriötekijä)	No	Yes	
2020	The Bouncer (Poke)	No	Yes	Short film, also actor

Television
Year	Title	Director	Writer	Notes
1997	The Joyboys Story	No	Yes	TV film, won the Montreux Bronze Rose Award for Comedy
1998	Studio Julmahuvi	Yes	Yes	TV series, won the Venla Award for Best Comedy Series
1999	Jerico 2000	Yes	Yes	TV film
2000–2001	Mennen tullen	Yes	Yes	TV miniseries
2003	Ranuan kummit	Yes	Yes	TV series, won the Venla Award for Best Comedy Series
2004	Sairaskertomuksia	No	Yes	TV series
2009	Ihmebantu	Yes	Yes	TV series, won both the Venla award and Golden TV award for Best Comedy Series
2010	Comedy Combat (Putous)	Yes	Yes	TV series
2019	M/S Romantic	Yes	Yes	TV miniseries, won the Golden Venlas for Best Director, Best Screenplay and Best Drama Series
2022	Summer of Sorrow (Munkkivuori)	Yes	Yes	TV series, won the Golden Venlas for Best Director, Best Screenplay and Best Drama Series
