= Maria's Paradise =

2019 film

- Film poster
- Finnish: Marian paratiisi
- Directed by: Zaida Bergroth
- Starring: Pihla Viitala
- Release date: 6 September 2019 (TIFF)
- Running time: 110 minutes
- Country: Finland
- Language: Finnish

Maria's Paradise (Finnish: Marian paratiisi) is a 2019 Finnish drama film directed by Zaida Bergroth. It was screened in the Contemporary World Cinema section at the 2019 Toronto International Film Festival.

== Cast ==
- Pihla Viitala as Maria Åkerblom
- Tommi Korpela as Eino Vartiovaara
- Elina Knihtilä as Saga
- Satu Tuuli Karhu as Salome
