= Sleeping preacher =

Type of Christian preacher

A sleeping preacher, also called trance-preacher, is a Christian, most often Protestant person who preaches, prophesies or addresses a public audience while "sleeping," that is, in a state of trance.

== History ==
The first reports of sporadic trance preachers, often children, are from the 16th and 17th century in Germany. Immediately after the revocation of the Edict of Nantes in 1685, a resistance movement broke out among the persecuted French Protestants of the Cevennes in Southern France. This movement, in which trance preaching was relatively widespread, is known as the "prophet movement", the "French Prophets" or eventually as the "Camisards". It spread to England in 1706 and to Germany and Switzerland in 1711 where its adherents took the name Wahre Insprierte, that is, 'True Inspirationalists'.

Amish sleeping preacher Noah Troyer lived three miles north of Kalona in Washington County, Iowa, which immediately adjoins Iowa County, where the Amana Colonies are situated, at the time the principal American establishment of the religious community of the Inspirationalists, also known as the Community of True Inspiration, who had brought trance preaching to North America.

An article of the Herald of Truth reported on 15 May 1882 that Noah Troyer had preached together with John D. Kauffman (1847–1913), who was also an Amish "sleeping preacher", both in an "unconscious state", Kauffman after Troyer, each for about two hours.

== Today ==
The Kauffman Amish Mennonites, also called Sleeping Preacher Churches or Tampico Amish Mennonite Churches, are the only existing church that goes back to a sleeping preacher, namely John D. Kauffman. They are a Plain, car-driving branch of the Amish Mennonites that, in contrast to other Amish Mennonites, have largely retained the Pennsylvania German language and other traditions from the late 1800s.

In 2017, the Kauffman Amish Mennonites had some 2,000 baptized members and lived mainly in Missouri and Arkansas.

== Examples ==
- Johann Friedrich Rock (1678–1749) from Germany
- Anna Rogel (1751–1784) from Finland
- Constantine Blackmon Sanders (1831–1887), a Presbyterian from the U.S.
- Noah Troyer (1831–1886), an Amish man from the U.S.
- John D. Kauffman (1847–1913), an Amish man from the U.S.
- Helena Konttinen (1871–1916) from Finland
- Edgar Cayce (1877–1945) from the U.S.
- Amanda Matilda Reunanen (1894–1965) from Finland
- Maria Åkerblom (1898–1981) from Finland

== See also ==
- Shouter movement

== Literature ==
- Clarke Garrett: Spirit Possession and Popular Religion: From the Camisards to the Shakers, Baltimore, 1987.
- Aarni Voipio: Sleeping Preachers: a Study in Ecstatic Religiosity, Helsinki, 1951.
- Harry H. Hiller: The Sleeping Preacher: An Historical Study of the Role of Charisma in Amish Society in Pennsylvania Folklife 18 (Winter 1968/69), pages 19-31.
- Don Yoder: Trance-Preaching in the United States in Pennsylvania Folklife 18 (Winter 1968/69), pages 12-18.
