= Sulevi Peltola =

Finnish actor (1946–2025)

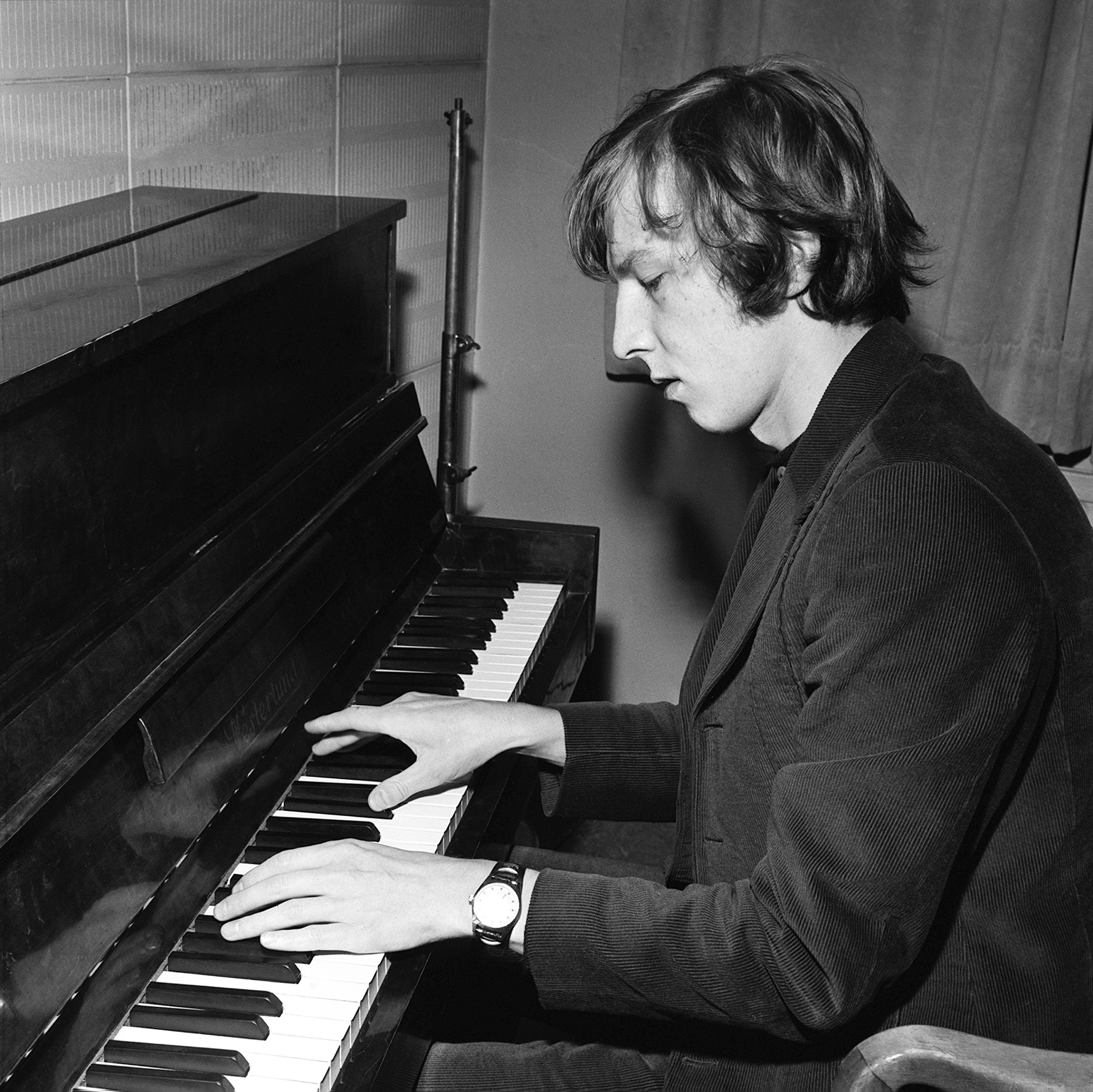
- Peltola in 1971
- Born: Sulevi Antero Peltola; 7 December 1946; Viljakkala, Pirkanmaa, Finland
- Died: 28 January 2025 (aged 78); Helsinki, Finland
- Occupation(s): Film and television actor

Sulevi Antero Peltola (7 December 1946 – 28 January 2025) was a Finnish film and television actor. He was known for playing PK in the 2002 film The Circle of Dreams, for which he won a Jussi Award in the category Best Actor.

Peltola died on 28 January 2025, in Viljakkala, at the age of 78.
