= Maria Åkerblom =

Finnish religious movement leader

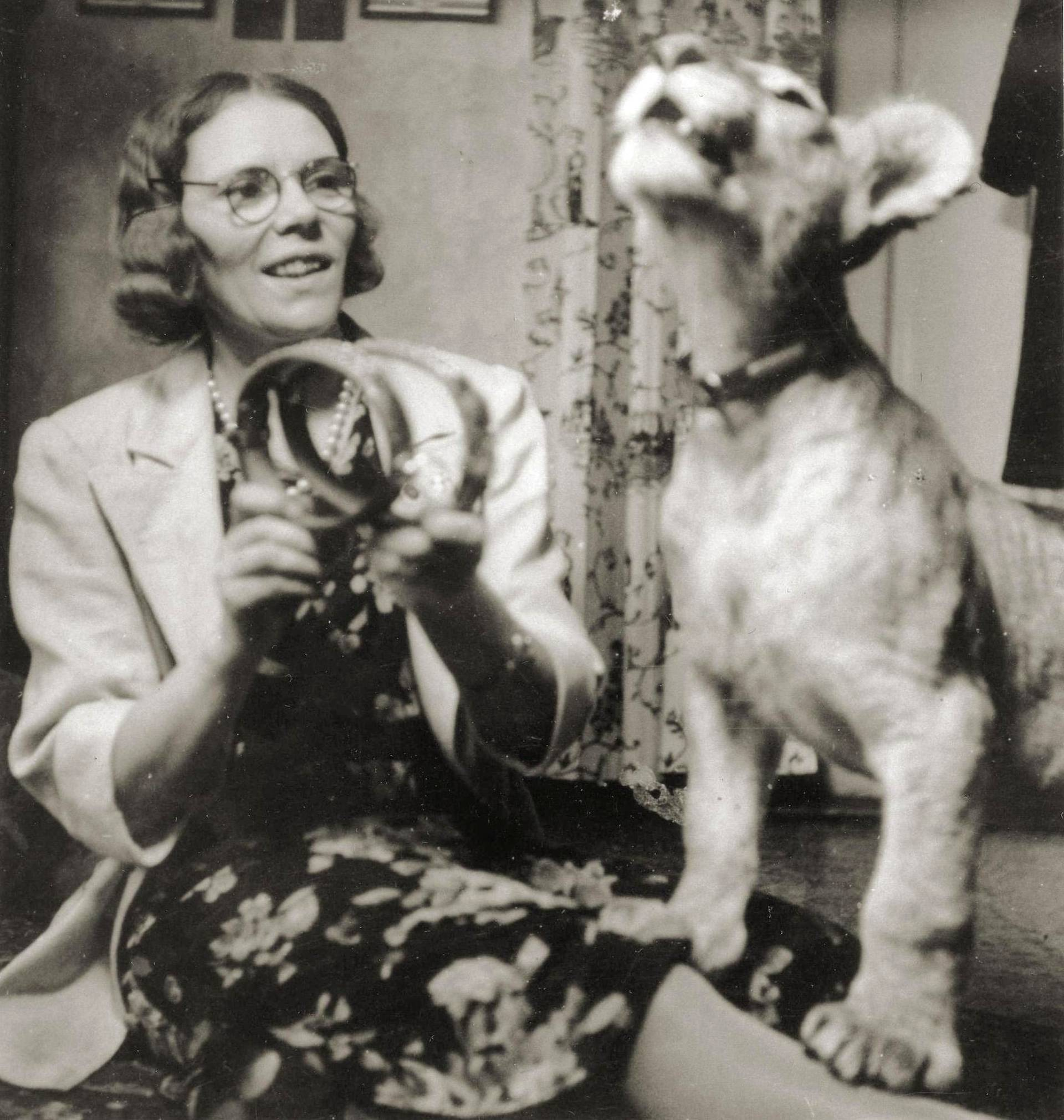
Maria Åkerblom with a cub of a lion in the early 1940s

Ida Maria Åkerblom (September 14, 1898 – February 25, 1981) was the leader of the Finnish Åkerblom Movement, an evangelical movement sometimes called a "cult". She had also served some time in prison. Her movement deemed her a prophet and began in the 1920s. Maria Åkerblom is characterized by Aarni Voipio as a "sleeping preacher", that is, a person who preaches in a state of trance.

The 2019 Zaida Bergroth film Maria's Paradise is based on Åkerblom's life.
