= Hayflower, Quiltshoe and the Feisty First-grader =

- Directed by: Lenka Hellstedt
- Written by: Sinikka Nopola; Tiina Nopola
- Based on: The book Hayflower, Quiltshoe, and the Feisty Schoolchild by Sinikka Nopola and Tiina Nopola
- Produced by: Jarkko Hentula; Anni Pänkäälä
- Starring: Matilda Pirttikangas; Emelia Levy; Niina Lahtinen; Joonas Nordman; Pirjo Heikkilä; Krisse Salminen; Janne Kataja; Lari Halme; Aksa Korttila
- Cinematography: Mark Stubbs
- Edited by: Iikka Hesse
- Music by: Katja Lappi; Miikka Huttunen
- Production companies: Yellow Film & TV; Ricky Rapper; Production Company Hihhihhii
- Distributed by: SF Studios
- Release date: February 14, 2020
- Running time: 75 minutes
- Country: Finland
- Language: Finnish
- Budget: €1,600,000

Hayflower, Quiltshoe and the Feisty First-grader (Finnish: Heinähattu, Vilttitossu ja ärhäkkä koululainen) is a 2020 Finnish children's film directed by Lenka Hellstedt. The movie is based on the 2013 children's book of the same name by Tiina Nopola and Sinikka Nopola. It is the third adaptation of the Hayflower and Quiltshoe book series.

The film premiered on February 14, 2020, and serves as a sequel to the 2017 movie Hayflower, Quiltshoe and the Rubens Brothers. Another sequel, Hayflower, Quiltshoe and the Chicken, was released in 2024.

== Plot ==
Hayflower begins school, learning new things along the way. Her younger sister, Quiltshoe, feels bored staying at home without her playmate. One day, when Hayflower's class is set to go on a fishing trip, Quiltshoe decides to disguise herself as her sister and join the school activities.

== Cast ==
- Matilda Pirttikangas as Quiltshoe
- Emelia Levy as Hayflower
- Niina Lahtinen as Hanna Kattilakoski
- Joonas Nordman as Matti Kattilakoski
- Pirjo Heikkilä as Helga Alibullen
- Krisse Salminen as Halise Alibullen
- Janne Kataja as Isonapa
- Lari Halme as Rillirousku
- Aksa Korttila as Annukka Pylkkänen
- Ona Kamu as recess supervisor and teacher in flashbacks
- Jukka Rasila as the principal
- Anna-Leena Sipilä as the wrong teacher
- Christoffer Strandberg as the gothic teacher
- Jarkko Tamminen as the voice of Hämis
- Matleena Kuusniemi as the voice of Luki

== Reception ==
The film received mixed reviews, however, it was seen as an improvement over its predecessor, Hayflower, Quiltshoe and the Rubens Brothers. Film-O-Holic noted that this time, the children did not take a back seat to the adults' antics.

The movie debuted on Friday, February 14, 2020, drawing 40,000 viewers on its opening weekend and becoming the weekend's top film. It was also the most-watched film of February in Finland, with a total of 142,884 viewers. By the end of March, the film had 176,276 viewers, slightly surpassing its predecessor's total audience. However, the COVID-19 pandemic led to cinema closures in mid-March.
