= Hayflower, Quiltshoe and the Rubens Brothers =

- Directed by: Anna Dahlman
- Screenplay by: Sinikka Nopola; Tiina Nopola
- Based on: Heinähattu, Vilttitossu ja Rubensin veljekset by Tiina Nopola and Sinikka Nopola
- Produced by: Jarkko Hentula
- Cinematography: Teppo Högman
- Edited by: Iikka Hesse
- Music by: Katja Lappi; Miikka Huttunen
- Production companies: Yellow Film & TV Oy; Ricky Rapper Oy; Tuotantoyhtiö Hihhihhii Oy
- Distributed by: SF Studios
- Release date: November 24, 2017 (fi)
- Running time: 90 minutes
- Country: Finland
- Language: Finnish
- Budget: €1,650,000

Hayflower, Quiltshoe and the Rubens Brothers (Finnish: Heinähattu, Vilttitossu ja Rubensin veljekset) is a 2017 Finnish family film directed by Anna Dahlman. It is based on the 2001 children's book of the same name by Tiina Nopola and Sinikka Nopola, part of the Hayflower and Quiltshoe series. The film is the second adaptation from the book series, following the 2002 movie Hayflower and Quiltshoe. A sequel, Hayflower, Quiltshoe and the Feisty First-grader, was released in 2020.

== Plot ==
The Kattilakoski family is going on vacation, as are local policemen Rillirousku and Isonapa, who are delighted to take a break from the family's antics. However, their holiday cabins turn out to be next to each other. To avoid detection, the policemen disguise themselves as artistic brothers, "the Rubens Brothers." Hayflower and Quiltshoe grow suspicious of their neighbors and begin spying on them. Meanwhile, two thieves are hiding in the nearby forest, searching for buried loot.

== Cast ==
- Matilda Pirttikangas as Quiltshoe
- Emelia Levy as Hayflower
- Niina Lahtinen as Hanna Kattilakoski
- Joonas Nordman as Matti Kattilakoski
- Pirjo Heikkilä as Helga Alibullen
- Krisse Salminen as Halise Alibullen
- Janne Kataja as Isonapa
- Lari Halme as Rillirousku
- Aksa Korttila as Annukka Pylkkänen
- Ona Kamu as recess supervisor and teacher in flashbacks
- Jukka Rasila as the principal
- Anna-Leena Sipilä as the wrong teacher
- Christoffer Strandberg as the gothic teacher
- Jarkko Tamminen as the voice of Hämis
- Matleena Kuusniemi as the voice of Luki

== Reception ==
The film received mixed reviews. Some praised the performances of the child actors, while others criticized the focus on adult characters. Episodi criticized the film for underestimating its audience, while Aamulehti appreciated its over-the-top comedic style.
