= Pyjama Party =

Finnish sketch comedy television series

- Finnish: Siskonpeti
- Genre: Comedy
- Created by: Anna Dahlman, Pirjo Heikkilä, Niina Lahtinen, Julia Jokinen, Katja Lappi
- Written by: Anna Dahlman, Pirjo Heikkilä, Niina Lahtinen, Krisse Salminen, Sanna Stellan, Joonas Nordman
- Starring: Pirjo Heikkilä, Niina Lahtinen, Krisse Salminen, Sanna Stellan, Jarkko Niemi, Joonas Nordman, Fathi Ahmed
- Composer: Katja Lappi
- Country of origin: Finland
- Original language: Finnish
- No. of seasons: 2
- No. of episodes: 24

Production
- Executive producers: Olli Haikka, Milla Bruneau, Petja Peltomaa
- Producers: Julia Jokinen, Jenni Säntti, Tuula Länsisalmi (Yle)
- Cinematography: Teppo Högman
- Editor: Jesse Jokela
- Running time: 23 minutes
- Production company: Yellow Film & TV

Original release
- Network: Yle
- Release: 2 January 2014 – 7 January 2016

Pyjama Party (Finnish: Siskonpeti) is a Finnish sketch comedy television series starring Niina Lahtinen, Pirjo Heikkilä, Sanna Stellan, Krisse Salminen, Joonas Nordman and Jarkko Niemi. Pyjama Party is scripted by the director Anna Dahlman with the actresses and composed by Katja Lappi.

The first season aired in Finland in 2014 and the second season in 2015. The TV series is produced by Yellow Film & TV and aired by Yle.

Pyjama Party is an unruly and sassy sketch comedy show with full of music, entertainment, personal accounts of the comedians’ private lives and weird performances such as awkward wedding speeches and clumsy lap dances. Every episode deals with a different type of theme e.g. Relationship (season 1 episode 2), Home (season 1 episode 3), Work (season 1 episode 4) or Sex (season 1 episode 5). Pyjama Party's sketch Booze day (Viinapäivä), which shows parents behaving like little children in a liquor store, became an international YouTube hit in 2015. It also received the annual award for promoting temperance in 2015.

== Awards ==
Pyjama Party won the Kultainen Venla Award for the best comedy and sketch program in 2014 and 2015. Pyjama Party was also selected for a nominee of The Best Comedy Show in Rose d'Or Awards 2016.
