= Ricky Rapper =

Finnish media franchise

- Ricky Rapper character
- First appearance: Hetki lyö, Risto Räppääjä (1997)
- Created by: Sinikka Nopola; Tiina Nopola
- Portrayed by: Niilo Sipilä; Severi Heikkilä; Lauri Karo; Samuel Shipway; Silmu Ståhlberg; Otso Törmälä; Aleksi Johansson
- Voiced by: Emil Kihlström

Ricky Rapper (Finnish: Risto Räppääjä) is a main character in a series of children's fantasy books and comic strips by Finnish writers Sinikka Nopola and Tiina Nopola. Ricky Rapper is a ten-year-old boy who likes to play drums. He lives in an apartment building with his aunt Serena Rapper.

Fourteen books have been released in the series starting from 1997. In 2008 Sinikka and Tiina Nopola scripted the musical movie Ricky Rapper. It was one of the most successful titles in the Finnish box-office of 2008. In 2010, the following movie Ricky Rapper and the Bicycle Thief was the sixth most successful title in the Finnish box-office of all time in its first weekend, and the most successful Finnish family movie of all time.

== Book series ==
Ricky Rapper
- Book cover of Hetki lyö, Risto Räppääjä
- Author: Sinikka Nopola, Tiina Nopola
- Original title: Risto Räppääjä
- Illustrator: Aino Havukainen, Sami Toivonen
- Country: Finland
- Language: Finnish
- Genre: Children's literature
- Publisher: Tammi

- Hetki lyö, Risto Räppääjä (1997)
- Risto Räppääjä ja kauhea makkara (1998)
- Risto Räppääjä ja Nuudelipää (2000)
- Risto Räppääjä ja pakastaja-Elvi (2001)
- Risto Räppääjä ja komea Kullervo (2002)
- Risto Räppääjä ja sitkeä finni (2003)
- Risto Räppääja ja Hilpuri Tilli (2004)
- Risto Räppääjä ja villi kone (2006)
- Risto Räppääjä ja viimeinen tötterö (2007)
- Risto Räppääjä ja kuuluisa Kamilla (2009)
- Risto Räppääjä saa isän (2011)
- Risto Räppääjä ja nukkavieru Nelli (2012)
- Risto Räppääjä ja kaksoisolento (2013)
- Risto Räppääjä ja Sevillan saituri (2014)
- Risto Räppääjä ja yöhaukka (2015)
- Risto Räppääjä ja pullistelija (2016)

== Television series and movies ==
- Ricky Rapper, 2000 (TV mini-series)

=== Films ===
- Ricky Rapper, 2008
- Ricky Rapper and the Bicycle Thief, 2010
- Ricky Rapper and Cool Wendy, 2012
- Ricky Rapper and Slick Leonard, 2014
- Ricky Rapper and the Miser from Seville, 2015
- Ricky Rapper and the Nighthawk, 2016
- Ricky Rapper and the Strongman, 2019
- Ricky Rapper and the Wrong Vincent, 2020
- Ricky Rapper and the Wild Machine, 2023
- Ricky Rapper and the Doppelganger, 2025
