= Ricky Rapper and Cool Wendy =

- Directed by: Mari Rantasila
- Written by: Sinikka Nopola; Tiina Nopola
- Produced by: Lasse Saarinen; Risto Salomaa
- Cinematography: Timo Heinänen
- Edited by: Tuuli Kuittinen
- Music by: Iiro Rantala
- Production company: Kinotar Oy
- Release date: 10 February 2012
- Country: Finland
- Budget: €1,586,000 (€650,000 from SES support)
- Box office: €2,514,570

Ricky Rapper and Cool Wendy (Finnish: Risto Räppääjä ja viileä Venla) is a 2012 Finnish family film directed by Mari Rantasila. It premiered on February 10, 2012. Lauri Karo stars as Ricky Rapper, while Venni Uotila plays Nelly Noodlehead and Olivia Ainali portrays the titular character, Cool Wendy.

This was the third and final Ricky Rapper film produced by Kinotar Oy. The next installment, Ricky Rapper and Slick Leonard, was produced by Artista Filmi.

== Plot ==
Ricky Rapper and Nelly Noodlehead travel to an island where Elvi Rapper is managing a holiday resort. They meet Cool Wendy and her father, Uolevi Horsmaniemi. Wendy, slightly older than Ricky and Nelly, disrupts their dynamic as Nelly becomes drawn to Wendy. Meanwhile, old friends Elvi and Uolevi grow closer. The film explores themes of friendship, loneliness, and accepting differences.

== Cast ==
- Lauri Karo as Ricky Rapper
- Venni Uotila as Nelly Noodlehead
- Olivia Ainali as Cool Wendy
- Annu Valonen as Rauha Rapper
- Martti Suosalo as Lennart Lindberg
- Ulla Tapaninen as Elvi Rapper
- Juha Muje as Uolevi Horsmaniemi

== Reception ==
The film was positively reviewed by Finnish critics.
