= Hyvät herrat =

1990–1996 Finnish television series

- Finnish: Hyvät herrat
- Genre: Political satire
- Created by: Jarmo Porola
- Written by: Lasse Lehtinen; Aarno Laitinen
- Starring: Matti Tuominen; Eero Melasniemi; Eila Pehkonen; Anja Pohjola; Sarina Röhr; Mikko Roiha; Billy Carson; Vilma Melasniemi
- Theme music composer: Jussi Halme
- Opening theme: Seppo Välimäki
- Country of origin: Finland
- Original language: Finnish
- No. of seasons: 7
- No. of episodes: 207

Production
- Running time: 58 minutes
- Production company: VipVision

Original release
- Network: Kolmoskanava, later MTV3
- Release: 15 January 1990 – 21 May 1996

Related
- Donna Paukku

Hyvät herrat (lit. 'Dear Sirs') is a Finnish political satire television series produced between 1990 and 1996. It was broadcast from 1990 to 1992 on Kolmoskanava and from 1993 to 1996 on MTV3. Aarno Laitinen served as the main screenwriter, assisted primarily by Lasse Lehtinen, who wrote under the pseudonyms Saara Lenso, Serita Numintio, and Sole Sarana. For several years, Yleisradio political editor Jarkko Juselius also contributed to the writing. The series was directed by Pertti Melasniemi and produced by Jarmo Porola. A total of 207 episodes were produced.

In 1999, a 15-part continuation series, Herrat nauraa, was released as a follow-up to the original programme.

== Overview ==
The main characters of the series are business advisor Johannes Paukku (Matti Tuominen), a sausage manufacturer who became wealthy with "Paukku's Run", and his son-in-law Raimo "Tollo" Koskivuo (Eero Melasniemi), a Social Democratic politician who was promoted from member of parliament to party secretary and minister during the series. In each episode, Paukku and Tollo organised a saunailta, or evening sauna party, and invited a political guest or other well-known public figure, with whom they attempted to gain support for their own political projects, accompanied by drinking and conversation. Paukku's character was reportedly modelled on business leader and industry lobbyist Heikki Tavela; however, series co-writer Aarno Laitinen denied this, instead naming Harri Kontion, a far-right construction industry entrepreneur.

The characters of Hyvät herrat were distinctly characterised, and the show's humour often relied on satire and irony. Paukku was portrayed as a chauvinistic and complaining industrialist, while Tollo was depicted as a calculating political opportunist. Through these characters, the series caricatured the so-called "good brother network" of politics, in which decisions were portrayed as being made informally in saunas and private meetings without the public's knowledge. The characters also indulged in drinking, luxury, and extramarital affairs; Paukku resided in Barcelona and Tollo's wife never appeared in the series.

In the first year, sauna guests' backs were washed by the character Armi (Eila Pehkonen). After Pehkonen's death in September 1991, she was replaced by Tyyne Hurskainen (Anja Pohjola), who commented on politics from the perspective of the "front-line" of the National Coalition Party. Throughout the series, the sauna guests were served the alcohol Koskenkorva Viina—referred to as "turpentine"—by various waiters: first Pia (Sarina Röhr), then Timo (Mikko Roiha), whom Paukku nicknamed "Håkan", and South African Dr. Samuel Livingstone Matabele (Billy Carson). Paukku's openly dismissive treatment of the waiters was used to satirise prejudices against women, sexual minorities, immigrants, and activists. According to director Melasniemi, Paukku was always the character who ultimately misbehaved, was ridiculed, and became the subject of laughter.

== Production and casting ==
To ensure topical political commentary, episodes in 1990 were filmed on Mondays and broadcast the same evening, which meant that the cast often had to read that day's afternoon newspapers during filming to prepare. From spring 1991 until the end of the series, recording was moved to Tuesdays, giving the production team one additional day of preparation. The show was filmed in the Park Hotel Käpylä in Käpylä, Helsinki, which has operated under the name Finlandia Park Hotel Helsinki since February 2017.

According to screenwriter Lasse Lehtinen, several well-known actors were considered for the role of Paukku, including Lasse Pöysti and Pentti Siimes. The main requirement was that the chosen actor had to be sober, which made casting difficult because many actors available at the time reportedly struggled with alcoholism. Director Pertti Melasniemi insisted on casting Matti Tuominen, a decision later regarded by Lehtinen as successful, believing Tuominen convincingly embodied the role. At the time, Tuominen was relatively unknown to television audiences, although he already had an extensive career in theatre. His son, actor Sakari Tuominen, later stated that in private life his father's personality was very different from Paukku's, describing him as shy, modest, and more of a sidekick than the centre of attention.

The theme music of the series, and other synthesizer music in the program, was made by Jussi Halme. At the beginning of episodes from 1994 to 1996, a computer-generated animation by Seppo Välimäki was used as its intro.

== Guests ==
In each episode of the series, a Finnish politician or other public figure appeared as themselves. Guests included senior political leaders such as ministers and presidents.

According to show writer Lasse Lehtinen, politicians actively sought to appear on the programme, and only a few, such as Paavo Väyrynen, declined invitations. Although the characters Paukku and Tollo often ridiculed their guests, there was no shortage of participants, as the programme offered media publicity and an opportunity to present personal views on a popular television show. In this way, real politics and the screenwriters' satire were interwoven in Hyvät herrat.

Esko Aho, former Prime Minister of Finland, took part in the filming of an episode but ultimately decided not to allow it to be broadcast. Russian diplomat Viktor Vladimirov had also agreed to appear but cancelled a day before recording; he was replaced on short notice by writer and politician Jörn Donner.

The President of Finland, Mauno Koivisto, was scheduled to appear in an episode to play volleyball with Tollo for the Sikariporras team. However, on the eve of filming, government negotiations were taking place. In order to blur the line between fact and fiction, director Pertti Melasniemi sent Tollo with a film crew to the negotiations to provide commentary. When newspapers reported the following day that Tollo had participated in the government's formation, the Office of the President indicated that Koivisto would not take part in the programme. Melasniemi later suggested that Koivisto would therefore never be seen in the series.

=== Partial list of guests ===
- Sauli Niinistö
- Tarja Halonen
- Martti Ahtisaari
- Elisabeth Rehn
- Matti Vanhanen
- Juha "Junnu" Vainio
- Ben Zyskowicz
- Jörn Donner
- Ilkka Kanerva
- Pirkko K. Koskinen
- Sanelma Vuorre
- Tuovi Allén
- Hannele Luukkainen
- Kerttu Törnqvist
- Leif Salmén
- Leena Harkimo
- Eero Paloheimo
- Riitta Suominen
- Ruben Stiller
- Spede Pasanen

== Impact ==
An episode broadcast on 6 April 1993 attracted 1.4 million viewers. The series made its main character, sales adviser Paukku, a cult figure. His recurring catchphrase "Personnel, turpentine!" (Henkilökunta, tärpättiä!) became widely recognised in Finland.

The appearances of high-ranking politicians on the programme, which frequently employed dark humour, also provoked controversy. In the mid-1990s, the current affairs programme Mediapeli on MTV3 organised a studio debate and viewer survey on the question, "Is it appropriate for ministers to appear on Hyvät herrat?". The discussion was illustrated with clips from a post–May Day episode of the series, in which Paukku and Tollo awoke from a drinking binge wearing May Day masks.

According to Tapani Ruokanen, biographer of President Martti Ahtisaari, Hyvät herrat contributed in 1992–1993 to raising Ahtisaari's public profile as a potential presidential candidate. His name was first mentioned in this context during an episode in September 1992. Shortly afterwards, Aarno Laitinen wrote a column in Iltalehti titled "Could it be Martti Ahtisaari?". Lehtinen, who was at odds with the long-time Social Democratic Party (SDP) chairman and former prime minister Kalevi Sorsa, reportedly opposed Sorsa's candidacy. Eero Heinäluoma, a later SDP chairman, recalled in Ahtisaari's biography: "The essential thing was that Lasse Lehtinen, a propagandist even more skilled than Joseph Goebbels, set out to push Ahtisaari for the presidency systematically, using the entire media and influencing his fellow journalists across outlets."

== Episodes ==
Season 1
Number	Name	Guest(s)	Airdate
1	Raha saa palkkansa	Jukka Keitele	15 January 1990
2	Tittelit pois	Riitta Suominen	22 January 1990
3	Oma koti turhan kallis	Arja Alho	29 January 1990
4	Kolmossivun tyttö	Heikki Tavela	5 February 1990
5	Kallis kansliapäällikkö	Bror Wahlroos	12 February 1990
6	Kirje rajan takaa	Leif Salmén	19 February 1990
7	Paukku ja Leppänen	Urpo Leppänen	26 February 1990
8	Karjala takaisin!	Johannes Virolainen	5 March 1990
9			12 March 1990
10	Oma pää ja pääoma	Esko Seppänen	19 March 1990
11	Muistamaton neuvos	Lasse Lehtinen	26 March 1990
12	Paljon onnea vaan	Juha Vainio	2 April 1990
13			9 April 1990
14			23 April 1990
15	Mustaa valkoisella		7 May 1990

Season 2
Number	Name	Guest(s)	Airdate
16	Turun muikku	Ari Valjakka	15 October 1990
17	Nautaa rajalle	Pekka Ruotsalainen	22 October 1990
18	Koivu ja johtotähti	Erja Tikka	29 October 1990
19	Kumin käryä		5 November 1990
20	Kusti polkee, lesti kulkee	Pekka Vennamo	12 November 1990
21	Pappia kyydissä	Heikki Riihijärvi	19 November 1990
22	Melkein ministeri	Pekka Kivelä	26 November 1990
23	Klyyvariklubi		3 December 1990
24	Vuorineuvosten vaivaistalo		10 December 1990
25	Paukkuryssiä	Rita Tainola	17 December 1990
26			29 January 1991
27			5 February 1991
28	Rauha ja solidaarisuus	Jukka Kuikka	12 February 1991
29			19 February 1991
30		Matti Louekoski	26 February 1991
31			5 March 1991
32			12 March 1991
33			19 March 1991
34			26 March 1991
35	Makkaraesirippu	Ben Zyskowicz	9 April 1991
36	Mooses ja Demostenes	Arto Tuominen	16 April 1991
37	Paukku ja pamppu	Sulo Aittoniemi	23 April 1991
38	Makkarapankki	Ulf Sundqvist	30 April 1991
39	Pallo hallussa	Anssi Rauramo	7 May 1991

Season 3
Number	Name	Guest(s)	Airdate
40	Ann yks silakk	Elisabeth Rehn	1 October 1991
41			8 October 1991
42			15 October 1991
43			22 October 1991
44			29 October 1991
45			5 November 1991
46			12 November 1991
47	Ei tippapullo tapa	Ilkka Kanerva	19 November 1991
48	Taistojen teillä	Matti Viialainen	26 November 1991
49	Kauhea Kankkunen	Juha Kankkunen	3 December 1991
50	Dynamiittia!!	Eero Paloheimo	10 December 1991
51	En etsi valtaa	Kirsti Paakkanen	17 December 1991
52	Kuollut kukko	Jörn Donner	4 January 1992
53	Poliisin tuttu		11 February 1992
54	Innostunut sonni		18 February 1992
55	Varkauspäivä	Hannele Luukkainen	25 February 1992
56	Lakkokenraalit	Risto Kuisma	3 March 1992
57	Tiede ja kunnia	Eino Tunkelo	10 March 1992
58	Valoa kansalle	Pentti Sierilä	17 March 1992
59	Peräänanattomat		24 March 1992
60	Sairas kansa		31 March 1992
61	Pekkaspäivä	Tarja Tenkula	7 April 1992
62	On sovittu		14 April 1992
63	Tuhlaajapojat	Raimo Ilaskivi	28 April 1992
64	Jokeri hihassa	Teemu Selänne; Hjallis Harkimo	5 May 1992
65	Valkoinen metsästäjä	Peter Fryckman	12 May 1992
66	Tasavallan miehet	Arvo Salo	19 May 1992
67	Hullujen huone	Claes Andersson	26 May 1992

Season 4
Number	Name	Guest(s)	Airdate
68	Loistelohta	Jukka Ojaranta	1 September 1992
69	Meedio	Terho Pursiainen	8 September 1992
70	Kolme muskettisoturia ("The Three Musketeers")	Raimo Vistbacka	15 September 1992
71	Työstä ja taistelusta	Mikko Laaksonen	22 September 1992
72	Mein Kampf	Renny Harlin	29 September 1992
73	Carlssonin kiusaus	Jorma Ojaharju	6 October 1992
74	Leijonaketju hyökkää	Seppo Lindblom	13 October 1992
75	Käytös kymmenen	Sanelma Vuorre	20 October 1992
76	Tasavallan ruorimiehet	Kimmo Sasi	27 October 1992
77	Miehen kääntöpuoli	Liisa Kulhia	3 November 1992
78	Kaasua, Kauppaneuvos Paukku	Pirjo-Riitta Antvuori	10 November 1992
79	Miesten turvakoti	Ilkka Taipale	17 November 1992
80			24 November 1992
81	Itsenäisyyden varjossa	Georg C. Ehrnrooth	1 December 1992
82	Porsaita äidin		8 December 1992
83	Sponsorisopimus	Riitta Suominen	5 January 1993
84	Joustavin hampain	Paavo Lipponen	12 January 1993
85	Työhönottohaastattelu	Olli Rehn	19 January 1993
86	Rakastan elämää	Jutta Zilliacus	26 January 1993
87	Suuri lehtijako	Markku Laukkanen	2 February 1993
88	Tappajahauki	Seppo Sarlund	9 February 1993
89	Kauhun tasapaino	Jaakko Laakso	16 February 1993
90	Vahakabinetti	Tarja Kautto	23 February 1993
91			2 March 1993
92			9 March 1993
93	Samma på svenska	Ole Norrback	16 March 1993
94	Yltiöheterö	Paavo Nikula	23 March 1993
95	Vettä ja leipää		30 March 1993
96	Saamamies	Kike Elomaa	6 April 1993
97	Pakettiratkaisu		20 April 1993
98	Taivaan täydeltä	Heikki Nikunen	27 April 1993
99	Vapaa Lappi	Esko-Juhani Tennilä	4 May 1993
100	Supersunnuntai	Antti Kalliomäki	11 May 1993
101	Turskan puolesta	Minna Karhunen	18 May 1993
102	Eväsreppu	Tuovi Allén	25 May 1993

Season 5
Number	Name	Guest(s)	Airdate
103	Musta Pekka		31 August 1993
104			7 September 1993
105	Hiomaton timantti	Anne Murto	14 September 1993
106	Ydinkysymys	Martti Tiuri; Matti Putkonen	21 September 1993
107	Ekoismi		28 September 1993
108	Kitkan viisas	Pauli Saapunki	5 October 1993
109	Kunnianmies	Lasse Virén	12 October 1993
110	Rantarosvot	Kari Häkämies	19 October 1993
111	Lähivaikuttaja		26 October 1993
112	Kyläpäälliköt	Aaro Heikkilä	2 November 1993
113	Työn sankarit	Juha Mieto	9 November 1993
114	Euromannekiini	Laila Snellman	16 November 1993
115	Isänmaa vaarassa		23 November 1993
116	Karelia-Express	Pekka Karhuvaara	30 November 1993
117	Vihreä akkavalta	Jaakko Pöyry	7 December 1993
118	Sanaton mutiainen	Lasse Kanerva	14 December 1993
119	Työmiehen tietolaari		11 January 1994
120	Lullan och Bullan	Tuulikki Ukkola	18 January 1994
121	Sylttytehdas	Sauli Niinistö	25 January 1994
122			1 February 1994
123	Sananvapauden tunarit	Uma Aaltonen	8 February 1994
124		Kirsi Piha	15 February 1994
125			22 February 1994
126			1 March 1994
127			8 March 1994
128	Jäätä särkemään		15 March 1994
129	Rehellinen konna	Volvo Markkanen	22 March 1994
130	Koirakoulu	Pentti Matikainen	29 March 1994
131	Karjala takaisin	Rauno Meriö	12 April 1994
132	Paavo ja Paavo	Seppo Pelttari	19 April 1994
133	Laastaria, laastaria	Peter Nygård	26 April 1994
134	Painista runoon	Pertti Ukkola	3 May 1994
135	Aatosta jaloa	Eino Grön	10 May 1994
136	Hellät varpaat	Curt Lindström	17 May 1994
137	Vihreä n**keri	Pekka Haavisto	24 May 1994

Season 6
Number	Name	Guest(s)	Airdate
138	Kaatuneiden muistopäivä	Veltto Virtanen	30 August 1994
139	Yks paskan maku	Kauko Juhantalo	6 September 1994
140	Malja Euroopalle	Rolf Kullberg	13 September 1994
141	Ryssän kätyri	Georg Paile	20 September 1994
142	Anekauppaneuvos	Tapani Ruokanen	27 September 1994
143	Likivihreät	Heidi Hautala	4 October 1994
144	Bryssä hyökkää	Erkki Liikanen	11 October 1994
145	Opin sauna	Olli-Pekka Heinonen	18 October 1994
146	Turun tauti	Mikko Rönnholm	25 October 1994
147	Maamiehen tietolaari	Heikki A. Ollila	1 November 1994
148	Miesten turvakoti	Sinikka Hurskainen	8 November 1994
149			15 November 1994
150	Muodollisesti pätevä	Anne Sällylä	22 November 1994
151	Nuori vesipeto		29 November 1994
152	Varjovastaanotto	Heikki Sarmanto; Matti Oiling	6 December 1994
153	Köyhien joulu	Niilo Tarvajärvi	13 December 1994
154	Hei, me sukelletaan	Jari Komulainen	17 January 1995
155			24 January 1995
156			31 January 1995
157			7 February 1995
158			14 February 1995
159	Paragondemari	Tarja Halonen	21 February 1995
160	Vaalilöylyt	Anneli Taina	28 February 1995
161			7 March 1995
162			14 March 1995
163	Käärme paratiisissa	Ruben Stiller	21 March 1995
164	Asfalttikepulainen	Matti Vanhanen	28 March 1995
165	Mäntsälä mielessäin	Timo T. A. Mikkonen	4 April 1995
166	Melkein ministeri		11 April 1995
167		Tuija Brax	25 April 1995
168			2 May 1995
169	Uusi poliittinen kulttuuri	Outi Ojala	9 May 1995
170	Lapuan vireä	Tapio Korjus	16 May 1995
171	Viimeinen demari	Aimo Kairamo; Tom Warelius	23 May 1995
172	Aatosta jaloa	Liisa Hyssälä	30 May 1995

Season 7
Number	Name	Guest(s)	Airdate
173	Iso vihree		29 August 1995
174	Ylämaan kunkku		5 September 1995
175	Hyvä kysymys		12 September 1995
176	Jhallikeisari		19 September 1995
177	Tohtorikopla		26 September 1995
178	Elokuvaa suurempaa	Spede Pasanen	3 October 1995
179			10 October 1995
180	Missitohtori		17 October 1995
181			24 October 1995
182			31 October 1995
183			7 November 1995
184			14 November 1995
185			21 November 1995
186	Hojo, hojo	Heikki Turunen	28 November 1995
187	Formuakauppa		5 December 1995
188	Sikaenergiaa		12 December 1995
189	Toveripaukku	Pekka Korpinen	9 January 1996
190	Tervemenoa		16 January 1996
191	Nuoret kotkat		23 January 1996
192	SULi kuuhun		30 January 1996
193	Leivätön pöytä		6 February 1996
194	Sissimajuri		13 February 1996
195	Routaporsas		20 February 1996
196	Silkkiä ja puoteja		27 February 1996
197	Oi noita taikureita		5 March 1996
198	Shakki ja nakki		12 March 1996
199	Ei EU-nukkeja!		19 March 1996
200	Paljon onnea vaan		26 March 1996
201	Helise maa!		2 April 1996
202	Havuja, perkele		16 April 1996
203	N**kerijatsia	Jyrki Kangas; Ted Curson; Reino Laine	23 April 1996
204	Kuninkaallinen vappu		30 April 1996
205	Viherkossu		7 May 1996
206	Kala nimeltään Vanda	Pekka Kejonen	14 May 1996
207	Laulu Katupoikien		21 May 1996

== Sequels ==
In 1999, a short sequel was made to the series called Herrat nauraa.

In the winter of 2006–2007, MTV3 aired a new series, Donna Paukku, in which Johannes Paukku's illegitimate daughter arrives in Finland and begins inviting sauna party guests, with the help of Tollo and former back-washer Tyyne Hurskainen. Of the actors in the original series, only Anja Pohjola, who played Tyyne Hurskainen, was involved. Aarno Laitinen did not contribute to Donna Paukku, but he could not prevent it from being done under copyright law.

== Reruns ==
In the first years of the series, episodes were reaired on the Sunday morning after their premiere. Episodes of the series were rerun in the summer of 1998. During the 2006 presidential elections, three episodes of the fifth season were reaired, in which presidential candidates Matti Vanhanen, Tarja Halonen and Sauli Niinistö appeared as guests. In addition, in the summer of 2006, MTV3 aired eight selected episodes from 1990 to 1992 as a wish list.

== Cast ==
- Matti Tuominen as trade advisor Johannes Paukku
- Eero Melasniemi as Member of Parliament/Party Secretary/Minister of State Raimo "Tollo" Koskivuo
- Eila Pehkonen as back-washer Armi (1990–1991)
- Anja Pohjola as back-washer Tyyne Hurskainen (1991–1996, 1999)
- Sarina Röhr as bartender Pia (1990–1991)
- Mikko Roiha as bartender Timo/Håkan (1992–1993)
- Billy Carson as South African-born bartender Dr. Samuel Livingstone Matabele (1993–1996)

== Cameo roles ==
Sales advisor Paukku made a cameo role in Ere Kokkonen's movie Vääpeli Körmy - taisteluni. In the film, when negotiations are underway to end the war between Finland and Sweden, the commander of the Swedish army is softened up by taking him to Paukku's sauna.

== Homages ==
The sauna facilities at Park Hotel Käpylä are named after the series characters Paukku, Tollo and Tyyne.
