= Ricky Rapper and the Bicycle Thief =

- Theatrical release poster
- Directed by: Mari Rantasila
- Written by: Sinikka Nopola; Tiina Nopola
- Produced by: Lasse Saarinen; Risto Salomaa
- Starring: Severi Heikkilä; Lauramaija Luoto; Annu Valonen; Ulla Tapaninen; Martti Suosalo; Marcus Groth
- Edited by: Tuuli Kuittinen
- Music by: Iiro Rantala
- Production company: Kinotar
- Distributed by: Nordisk Film
- Release dates: October 2009 (Mill Valley); February 12, 2010 (Finland)
- Running time: 100 minutes
- Country: Finland
- Language: Finnish
- Budget: € 1,700,000
- Box office: $ 3,151,286 (13 September 2010)

Ricky Rapper and the Bicycle Thief (Finnish: Risto Räppääjä ja polkupyörävaras) is a 2009 Finnish musical film. The film is based on children's fantasy book series Ricky Rapper of Sinikka Nopola and Tiina Nopola. However, the film is not based on any book volume. The children's musical comedy Ricky Rapper and the Bicycle Thief continues loosely the previous film Ricky Rapper. The film was shot in Kartanonkoski in the city of Vantaa and also in Hyvinkää, Porvoo and Sipoo in the summer 2009. Furthermore, train station scenes were shot in the Kauklahti railway station in the city of Espoo and on the Ilmala rail yard in the city of Helsinki.

The previous Ricky Rapper film was shot a couple of years earlier and the kid actors, as Ricky Rapper and Nelly Butterfly, were "over-aged". Consequently, the studio hired new main actors. However, previous stars make a pop-up visit during the end credits of the film.

The Ricky Rapper and the Bicycle Thief received 38,425 viewers in its first weekend – almost double as the previous film. The result was the sixth most successful in the Finnish box-office in its first weekend all-time, and the most successful Finnish family movie all-time. In 2010, the Ricky Rapper and the Bicycle Thief received 328 000 viewers and it was the second popular Finnish film in that year.

== Synopsis ==
Aunt Serena Rapper and Lennart Lindberg leave on a vacation and Fanny Freezer comes to take care of Ricky Rapper and Nelly Noodlehead. Ricky gets a new bike, but the bike disappears inexplicably.

== Cast ==
- Severi Heikkilä as Ricky Rapper: A ten-year-old boy who likes to play drums
- Lauramaija Luoto as Nelly Butterfly/Noodlehead: A girl who is a friend of Ricky.
- Annu Valonen as Serena Rapper: Ricky's aunt who dates with Mr. Lennart Lindberg.
- Martti Suosalo as Lennart Lindberg: A shy man who dates with Ms. Serena Rapper.
- Ulla Tapaninen as Fanny the Freezer: Aunt Serena's cousin who takes care of the household.
- Marcus Groth as Bertil Rosenbögel: A mysterious man with a van who has something to do with the bike.
