= Ricky Rapper and the Wrong Vincent =

- Directed by: Maria Sid
- Written by: Sinikka Nopola; Tiina Nopola; Josefina Rautiainen
- Based on: Risto Räppääjä ja väärä Vincent by Sinikka and Tiina Nopola
- Produced by: Risto Salomaa; Jukka Helle; Markus Selin; Sinikka Nopola; Tiina Nopola
- Starring: Silmu Ståhlberg; Lumi Kallio; Jenni Kokander; Ylermi Rajamaa; Minka Kuustonen
- Cinematography: Robert Nordström
- Edited by: Joona Louhivuori
- Music by: Iiro Rantala
- Production company: Solar Films
- Distributed by: Nordisk Film
- Release date: October 9, 2020
- Running time: 86 minutes
- Country: Finland
- Language: Finnish
- Budget: €1,740,000

Ricky Rapper and the Wrong Vincent (Finnish: Risto Räppääjä ja väärä Vincent) is a 2020 Finnish children's film directed by Maria Sid. The film is based on the book of the same name by Sinikka Nopola and Tiina Nopola.

== Cast ==
- Silmu Ståhlberg - Ricky Rapper
- Lumi Kallio - Nelly Noodlehead
- Jenni Kokander - Freezer-Elvi
- Ylermi Rajamaa - Leonard Lindberg
- Minka Kuustonen - Rauha Rapper

== Reception ==
The film had relatively positive reviews.
