= Lauma (game show) =

Finnish TV series

- Genre: Panel show
- Created by: Roope Salminen; Joonas Nordman
- Directed by: Joonas Nordman
- Presented by: Roope Salminen
- Country of origin: Finland
- Original language: Finnish
- No. of seasons: 1
- No. of episodes: 4

Production
- Executive producers: Olli Haikka; Tomi Paajanen; Miia Lehtinen; Riku Riihilahti; Joonas Nordman; Lilli Blomberg (MTV)
- Producer: Veera Lappi
- Running time: 41 minutes
- Production company: Yellow Film & TV

Original release
- Network: MTV3; C More
- Release: 10 October 2021 – present

Lauma (English: The Herd ) is a Finnish comedic panel game show, where regular panelists and guests try to answer trivial quiz questions the same way as the others. The show is hosted by the creator of the format, Roope Salminen and it airs on MTV3 network.

== Format ==
In each episode, there are five permanent panelists, and three guests. Before filming an episode, each of them answer to seven creatively made questions. However, as they answer, they must think, what the other competitiors answer to that question; only that way will they score points, and as if they belong to "The Herd". Those points are increasingly important, when going to the final round. The answers are then reviewed at the studio.

In the final round, called "Reverse round", the rules are the opposite; each of the panelists must think about the answer that way, that nobody else, or at least majority of the fellow panelists, answer the same way. The panelists with the most points at the end will be crowned as the episode winners.

== Panelists ==
The five "regular panelists" for the first season included: finnish actor and presenter Ernest Lawson, actress Heli Sutela, radio presenter Juuso "Köpi" Kallio, comedian Fathi Ahmed and model Shirly Karvinen. In every episode, there were also three guests – amongst others, Minka Kuustonen, Jethro Rosted, Dennis Nylund and Eppu Salminen (father of the host, Roope Salminen).

== Episodes ==
=== Series overview ===
Season	Episodes	Originally aired	
Season	Episodes	First aired	Last aired
1	4	10 November 2021	1 December 2021
2	8	2024	

=== Season 1 (2021) ===
Episode	Original air date	Guests	Episode winner(s)
1	10 November 2021	Sanna Stellan, Antti Tuomas Heikkinen & Elias Salonen	Elias Salonen (Guest)
2	17 November 2021	Eppu Salminen, Ripsa Koskinen-Papunen & Dennis Nylund	Ernest Lawson & Köpi Kallio
3	24 November 2021	Ville "Viki" Eerikkilä, Minka Kuustonen & Mikko Penttilä	Köpi Kallio
4	1 December 2021	Karoliina Tuominen, Jethro Rosted & Christoffer Strandberg	Ernest Lawson

== Reception ==
The first season of the show did well, scoring an average of about 314,000 viewers on its debut episode.

=== Awards and nominations ===
Year	Awards	Nominated	Results	Ref.
2021	Golden Venla	Game Show	Nominated	
