= Hayflower, Quiltshoe and the Chicken =

- Directed by: Reetta Aalto
- Screenplay by: Sinikka Nopola; Tiina Nopola; Emma Nopola; Lenka Hellstedt
- Based on: Hayflower, Quiltshoe and the Chicken by Sinikka Nopola and Tiina Nopola
- Produced by: Anni Pänkäälä
- Production company: Yellow Film & TV
- Distributed by: SF Studios
- Release date: 16 February 2024
- Country: Finland
- Language: Finnish
- Budget: €1,727,000 (including €600,000 support from the Finnish Film Foundation)

Hayflower, Quiltshoe and the Chicken (Finnish: Heinähattu, Vilttitossu ja kana) is a Finnish children's film released in February 2024. It is based on the book of the same name by Sinikka Nopola and Tiina Nopola. The film was directed by Reetta Aalto.

The film marked the final collaboration of Sinikka and Tiina Nopola on a screenplay. It continues the adventures of the titular characters, Hayflower and Quiltshoe, following previous films in the series.

== Reception ==
By the end of April 2024, the film had garnered over 170,000 viewers, making it the fifth most-watched film of the year in Finland.
