= Ricky Rapper (film) =

- Theatrical release poster
- Directed by: Mari Rantasila
- Written by: Sinikka Nopola; Tiina Nopola
- Produced by: Lasse Saarinen; Risto Salomaa
- Starring: Niilo Sipilä; Mimmi Lounela; Annu Valonen; Martti Suosalo; Ulla Tapaninen
- Edited by: Tuuli Kuittinen
- Music by: Iiro Rantala
- Production company: Kinotar
- Distributed by: Nordisk Film
- Release date: 15 February 2008
- Running time: 79 minutes
- Country: Finland
- Language: Finnish
- Budget: €1,134,478
- Box office: $2,270,632

Ricky Rapper (Finnish: Risto Räppääjä) is a 2008 Finnish musical film. The film is based on two volumes of Sinikka Nopola's and Tiina Nopola's children's fantasy book series Ricky Rapper. The book volumes were originally released as Risto Räppääjä ja Nuudelipää of 2000 and Risto Räppääjä ja pakastaja-Elvi of 2001. Ricky Rapper is a comedy for children. It tells about the friendship between 10-year-old boy and girl in the normal suburb neighbourhood. The film was shot in Kartanonkoski in the city of Vantaa in the summer 2007.

Ricky Rapper was the most viewed Finnish film in Finland in 2008 with its 209,506 viewers and it was the sixth most viewed of all the Finnish films. The film received more than 215,000 viewers, and the DVD version has been sold almost 100,000 copies.

The following film Ricky Rapper and the Bicycle Thief was released in 2010, and it received 38,425 viewers in its first weekend – almost double as the previous film.

== Synopsis ==
Ricky lives with his Aunt Serena and loves playing drums. However she breaks her leg and cousin Fanny moves in to take care of the household. "Fanny the Freezer" is strict and orderly – and this means no drums for Ricky. With the help of his downstairs neighbor Nelly Butterfly, Ricky seeks to restore order to the apartment and get his drums back.

== Cast ==
- Niilo Sipilä as Ricky Rapper: A ten-year-old boy who likes to play drums
- Mimmi Lounela as Nelly Butterfly/Noodlehead: A girl who moves into Ricky's building.
- Annu Valonen as Serena Rapper: Ricky's aunt who dreams of Mr. Lindberg who lives downstairs.
- Martti Suosalo as Lennart Lindberg: A shy man who also dreams of Ms. Serena Rapper who lives upstairs.
- Ulla Tapaninen as Fanny the Freezer: Aunt Serena's cousin who moves in to take care of the household.
