= Ricky Rapper and the Wild Machine =

- Directed by: Maria Sid
- Written by: Sinikka Nopola; Tiina Nopola; Emma Nopola
- Based on: Risto Räppääjä ja villi kone by Sinikka and Tiina Nopola
- Produced by: Rimbo Salomaa; Markus Selin; Jukka Helle
- Starring: Otso Törmälä; Meri Lahikainen; Minka Kuustonen; Jenni Kokander; Ylermi Rajamaa
- Cinematography: Jari Mutikainen
- Edited by: Toni Tikkanen; Joel Olander
- Music by: Iiro Rantala
- Production company: Solar Films
- Distributed by: Nordisk Film
- Release date: February 17, 2023
- Running time: 77 minutes
- Country: Finland
- Language: Finnish
- Budget: 1 653 000 €

Ricky Rapper and the Wild Machine (Finnish: Risto Räppääjä ja villi kone) is a 2023 Finnish children's film directed by Maria Sid. The film is based on the book of the same name by Sinikka Nopola and Tiina Nopola.

Filming took place in summer 2022 in Helsinki and Vantaa. The film was produced by Rimbo Salomaa, Markus Selin, and Jukka Helle, and it is a co-production between Solar Films and the Ricky Rapper series. Distribution is handled by Nordisk Film.

== Cast ==
- Otso Törmälä - Ricky Rapper
- Meri Lahikainen - Nelly Noodlehead
- Jenni Kokander - Freezer-Elvi
- Ylermi Rajamaa - Leonard Lindberg
- Minka Kuustonen - Rauha Rapper
- Benjamin Willamo - Ville Pyry
- Aku Sipola - Pontus Butterfly
- Jutta Järvinen - Pinja Butterfly
