= Paukku =

Paukku is a Finnish surname. Notable people with the surname include:

- Juho Paukku (born 1986), Finnish tennis player

== Fictional characters ==
- Donna Paukku, in the Finnish television series Donna Paukku
- Johannes Paukku, in the Finnish television series Hyvät herrat
