= Supercool (film) =

- Film poster
- Directed by: Teppo Airaksinen
- Written by: Olli Haikka; Ali Moussavi; Patricia Goren; Eric Goren
- Produced by: Olli Haikka
- Starring: Jake Short; Miles J. Harvey; Madison Davenport; Odessa A'zion; Iliza Shlesinger; Damon Wayans Jr.
- Cinematography: Cory Geryak
- Edited by: Jussi Rautaniemi
- Music by: Jacques Brautbar
- Production company: Yellow Film & TV
- Distributed by: Vertical Entertainment (United States); SF Studios (Finland)
- Release dates: 9 April 2021 (SFIFF); 11 February 2022 (Finland and U.S.)
- Running time: 91 minutes
- Countries: Canada; Finland; United States
- Language: English
- Budget: EUR 8.8 million (US$9.5 million)

Supercool is a 2021 comedy film directed by Teppo Airaksinen and written by Olli Haikka. Set in the American high school milieu, the film tells the story about a boy who wishes to be cool enough to socialize with his crush, but when the wish comes true, he suddenly wakes up one morning to a different reality. The film stars Jake Short, Miles J. Harvey and Madison Davenport.

The film premiered at the San Francisco International Film Festival on April 9, 2021 and was released on February 11, 2022.

== Plot ==
Best friends, Neil and Gilbert start their senior year of high school with high hopes and aspirations. Neil has always fantasized about being cool enough to date his long-time crush Summer and Gilbert has always dreamed of being a social media superstar. After what is, by all accounts, a very disappointing and embarrassing first day in school, Neil makes a magical wish to be cool just at the magical moment when the clock strikes 11:11. The next morning, Neil wakes up to a reality that is straight from the comics of his dreams. With the assistance of Neil's charismatic neighbor, Jimmy, and Gilbert's wild ideas, Neil endures one epic night.

== Cast ==
- Jake Short as Neil
- Miles J. Harvey as Gilbert
- Madison Davenport as Summer
- Odessa A'zion as Jaclyn
- Iliza Shlesinger as Victoria
- Damon Wayans Jr. as Jimmy
- Peter Moses as Justin
- Jonathan Kite as Uber Driver
- Kira Kosarin as Ava
- Madison Bailey as Emily
- Will Meyers as Chad
- Greg Cromer as Officer Shepherd
- Luis Fernandez-Gil as Officer Ramirez

== Reception ==
On the review aggregator website Rotten Tomatoes, the film holds an approval rating of 40% based on 10 reviews, with an average rating of 4.9/10.
