= Hayflower and Quiltshoe (film) =

- Directed by: Kaisa Rastimo
- Screenplay by: Kaisa Rastimo; Marko Rauhala; Based on books by: Sinikka Nopola; Tiina Nopola
- Produced by: Marko Rauhala; Sinikka Usvamaa
- Starring: Katriina Tavi; Tilda Kiianlehto; Minna Suuronen; Antti Virmavirta
- Cinematography: Tuomo Virtanen
- Edited by: Kaisa Rastimo
- Music by: Hector
- Production company: Kinotaurus
- Release date: 18 October 2002
- Running time: 75 minutes
- Country: Finland
- Language: Finnish
- Budget: €1,287,000

Hayflower and Quiltshoe (Finnish: Heinähattu ja Vilttitossu) is a Finnish children's film released in 2002. Directed by Kaisa Rastimo, the movie is based on the book series by Sinikka Nopola and Tiina Nopola, which began in 1989.

The story is based on an original screenplay that blends new elements with details from the book series. The film was dubbed as the Finnish answer to Pippi Longstocking.

== Plot ==
Hayflower is about to start school, but instead of enjoying her last days of childhood, she becomes preoccupied with organizing her family's chaotic life. Quiltshoe, her mischievous younger sister, is unhappy with their routine meals and runs away to the neighbors, the Alibullen sisters, to enjoy their lavish feasts. Concerned, Hayflower follows her.

The family's dynamics come to a head when Quiltshoe's antics escalate. Hayflower prays for help but eventually learns she must take matters into her own hands, adopting some of Quiltshoe's rebellious ways. Chaos and comedy ensue as the family navigates their issues.

== Cast ==
- Katriina Tavi – Hayflower
- Tilda Kiianlehto – Quiltshoe
- Minna Suuronen – Hanna Kattilakoski (mother)
- Antti Virmavirta – Matti Kattilakoski (father)
- Päivi Akonpelto – Halise Alibullen
- Merja Larivaara – Helga Alibullen
- Heikki Sankari – Officer Bigbelly
- Robert Enckell – Officer Eyeglass

== Reception ==
The film won two Jussi Awards for Best Costume Design (Tiina Kaukanen) and Best Production Design (Katriina Ilmaranta). It was screened at the Chicago International Children's Film Festival, Stockholm International Film Festival Junior, and the Tehran Roshd Film Festival.
