= Ricky Rapper and the Miser from Seville =

Ricky Rapper and the Miser of Seville
- Theatrical release poster
- Directed by: Timo Koivusalo
- Screenplay by: Sinikka Nopola; Tiina Nopola; Timo Koivusalo
- Produced by: Timo Koivusalo
- Music by: Esa Nieminen
- Production company: Artista Filmi Oy
- Distributed by: Buena Vista International
- Release date: 13 February 2015
- Country: Finland
- Language: Finnish
- Budget: €1,400,000 (SES funding: €560,000)
- Box office: €2,731,827

Ricky Rapper and the Miser of Seville (Finnish: Risto Räppääjä ja Sevillan saituri) is a Finnish musical film directed by Timo Koivusalo, released on 13 February 2015. It is based on the book of the same name by Sinikka Nopola and Tiina Nopola.

== Plot ==
Elvi (Riitta Havukainen) and Risto (Samuel Shipway) receive a letter from a relative in Seville, Spain, promising to bequeath their fortune to Risto. Elvi and Rauha (Minttu Mustakallio) decide to prepare Risto for high society, while Nelli (Sanni Paatso) joins them in exploring the mysterious mansion. Unexplained events ensue.

== Cast ==
- Samuel Shipway as Ricky Rapper
- Sanni Paatso as Nelly Noodlehead
- Vesa Vierikko as Lennart Lindberg
- Minttu Mustakallio as Rauha Rapper
- Riitta Havukainen as Elvi Rapper
- Esko Roine as the Miser, Ernesti Ohranen
- Tom Lindholm as Arnold Rätvänä, the servant
- Ismo Kallio as Shopkeeper
- Ritva Jalonen as Opera Singer
- Katariina Lohiniva as Grandmother of the Horse Girl
- Heikki Silvennoinen as Older Risto
- Timo Kahilainen as Older Servant

== Production ==
Filming took place during the summer of 2014, primarily in Villilä Studios in Nakkila and the old town of Naantali. The film is the fifth installment in the Risto Räppääjä series, produced by Artista Filmi.

== Reception ==
The film was the highest-grossing in Finland on its opening weekend (13–15 February 2015), with 59,684 viewers. By February’s end, it had surpassed 200,000 viewers.
