= Mari Rantasila =

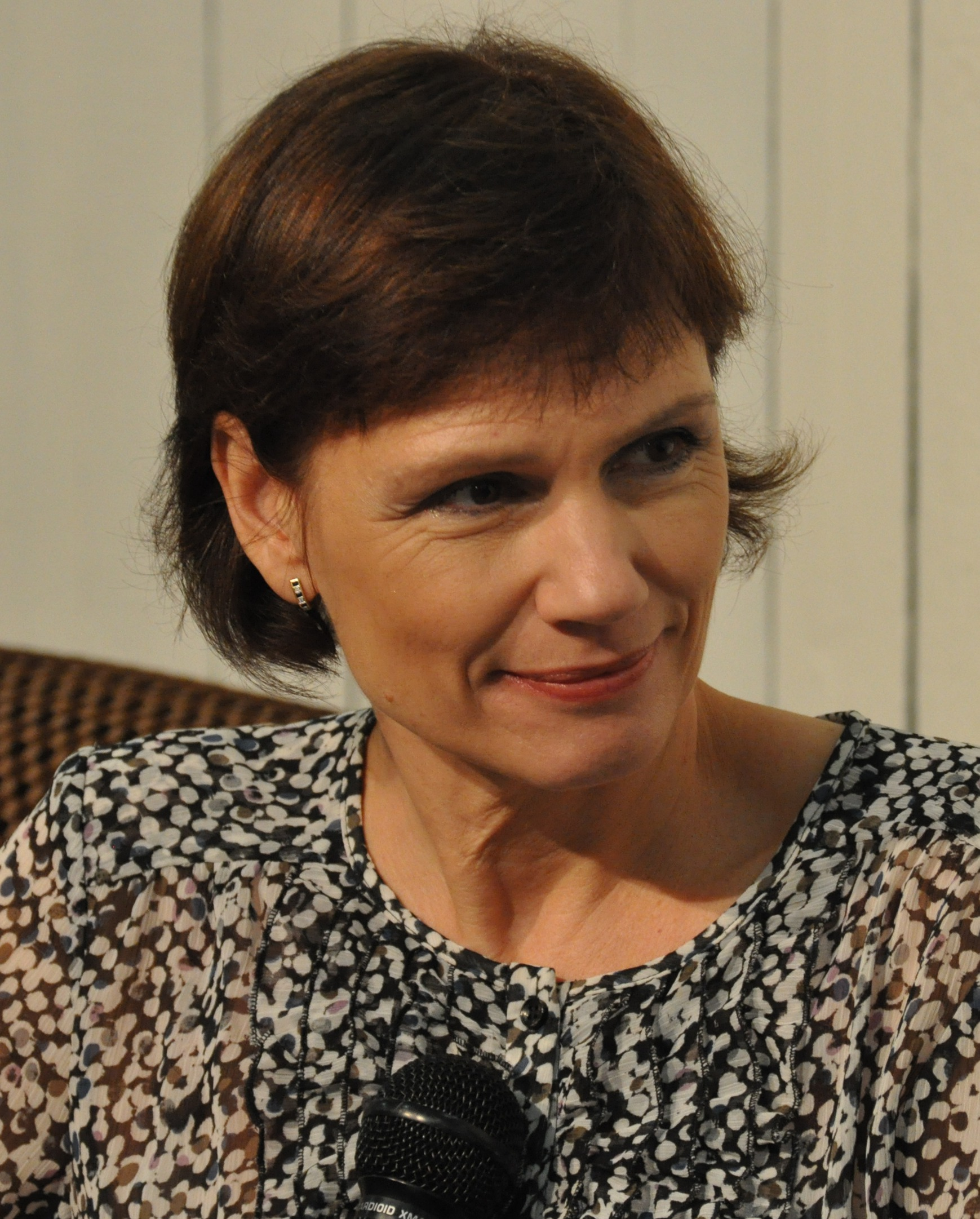
- Rantasila in 2013
- Born: 7 January 1963 (age 63); Pori, Finland
- Other names: Ritva Leena Mari Rantasila
- Occupations: singer, actress, director
- Website: www.marirantasila.com

Ritva Leena Mari Rantasila (born 7 January 1963 in Pori, Finland) is a Jussi Award-winning Finnish actress, director and singer.

== Career ==
Rantasila studied as an actress at the Helsinki Theatre Academy, during which time Jouko Turkka was working as a teacher. Rantasila graduated with a master's degree in 1987. She is best known for acting in the TV series Raid (2000), in which she played the female lead, and Kotikatu (1995–2001, 2008–2009). In 2015 Rantasila acted in the Petri Kotwica film Henkesi edestä (Absolution).

Rantasila became known as a singer in 1989 with the song "Auringossa" (In the Sun). In 2000, she sung the theme song of the TV series Raid, "Vain rakkaus" (Only Love). In 2000, she won the Best Female Soloist Emma prize. Rantasila has also worked as a songwriter since the disc Kaipuun kääntöpiiri. Markku Kanerva has also composed many of Rantasila's tracks.

Rantasila has directed short films and three Risto the Rapper films: Ricky Rapper (2008) and the sequels Ricky Rapper and the Bicycle Thief (2010) and Risto Räppääjä and Villeä Venla (2012).

In 2016, Rantasila won the Best Supporting Female Actress Jussi Award for her role in Henkesi edestä (2016).

== Personal life ==
Mari Rantasila's original name is Ritva Leena. She began using the name Mari as a 15-year old before changing it officially in the 1980s.

Rantasila's brother Juha Rantasila is a former professional ice hockey player.

== Filmography ==
=== Films ===
- Calamari Union (1985) (actress)
- Varjoja paratiisissa (1986) (actress)
- Lauran huone (1988) (actress)
- Ameriikan raitti (1990) (actress)
- Sano Oili vaan (2000) (actress)
- Lakeuden kutsu (2000) (actress)
- Don’t Push the River (2001) (actress)
- Pieniä eroja (2002) (director)
- Raid (2003) (actress)
- Eläville ja kuolleille (2005) (actress)
- Aavan meren tällä puolen (2007) (actress)
- Risto Räppääjä (2008) (director)
- Suuri performanssi (2008) (actress)
- Risto Räppääjä ja polkupyörävaras (2010) (director)
- Risto Räppääjä ja viileä Venla (2012) (director)
- Ainoat oikeat (2013) (actress)
- Lovemilla (2015) (actress)
- Henkesi edestä (2015) (actress)
- Jättiläinen (2016) (actress)
- My Name Is Dingo (2024) (director)

=== TV ===
- TV series Seitsemän veljestä (1989) (actress)
- Pakanamaan kartta (1991) (actress)
- Milkshake (1994) (actress)
- Kummeli (1994) (guest actress)
- Kotikatu (1995–2001, 2008) (actress)
- Lihaksia ja luoteja (1997) (actress)
- Raid (2000) (actress)
- Mankeli (2001) (guest actress)
- Don't Push The River (2001) (actress)
- Kiltin yön lahjat (2004) (director)
- Miehen sydän (2004) (actress)
- Jako kahteen (2007) (actress)
- #lovemilla (2013) (actress)
- Syke (2015) (actress)
- Downshiftaajat (2015) (actress)
- Kynsin hampain (2016) (actress)
- Helsinki Syndrome (2022, 2024) (actress)

== Discography ==
=== Albums ===
- Secret Life (1987, EMI )
- In the Sun (1989, EMI)
- The Forgiving Circuit (1993, Sonet, Polygram)
- Only Love (2000, Edel Records )
- Mari Rantasila – Classics (2000)
- Our Travel (2001, Edel Records)
- Something's Over It's ... (2003)
- Time Travel (2004)
- Strange Dreams – Hector's Songs (2008)

=== Singles ===
- Lemmen aakkoset (1989)
- Juhlat salissa (1993)
- Hei me lennetään (1993)
- Neppari-Ari (1994)
- Kun taas sinut nähdä saan (2000)
- Ois vaan kiva tietää (2013)
- Hei Maija (2013)

=== Appearing on ===
- Kumijalka 1996
- YUP: Alla jalavapuun 1996
- Samuli Edelman: Lokki ja mä 2001
- Jalometallia kokoelma 2003
- Velhovaarin lauluja 2014
