= Lauma (disambiguation) =

Lauma a fairy-like woodland spirit in Eastern Baltic mythology. Lauma may also refer to:

== People ==
- Lauma Grīva (born 1984), Latvian athlete
- Lauma Skride (born 1982), Latvian pianist

== Other uses ==
- Lauma (game show), Finnish game show
- Lauma, a character in 2020 video game Genshin Impact
