= Fathi Ahmed =

Finnish-Somali actor and stand-up comedian

- Born: Fathi Ahmed; 1991 (age 34–35); Järvenpää, Finland
- Occupations: Stand-up comedian, actor
- Years active: 2015–present

Fathi Ahmed (born 1991) is a Finnish–Somali actor and comedian. He is best known for his roles in the popular television serials Aurora, Aikuiset and Modernit miehet.

== Personal life ==
He was born in Järvenpää, Finland to Somali parents. His parents moved to Finland and are first-generation immigrants.

== Career ==
He first trained to be a chef. However, he moved to the entertainment industry and received the title of stand-up newcomer comedian in 2014. He also competed in TV2's Naurun tasapaino. He played several comedy shows in several Finnish cities. He became very popular with the comedy program, Naurun tasapaino.

Apart from stand-up comedy, he has also starred in several television series including Noin viikon uutiset, Aurora, Aikuiset and Modernit miehet where he started television career with the serial Siskonpeti in 2015. In the same year, he played the role 'African neighbor' in the popular serial Downshiftaajat.

== Filmography ==
Year	Film	Role	Genre	Ref.
2015	Siskonpeti		TV series	
2015	Downshiftaajat	African neighbor	TV series	
2016	Noin viikon uutiset		TV series	
2018	Noin viikon studio		TV series	
2019	Modernit miehet	Fathi	TV series	
2019	Aurora	Asylum Seeker	Film	
2019	Aikuiset	Tarjoilija	TV series	
