= Billy Carson (actor) =

American actor & musician (born 1955)

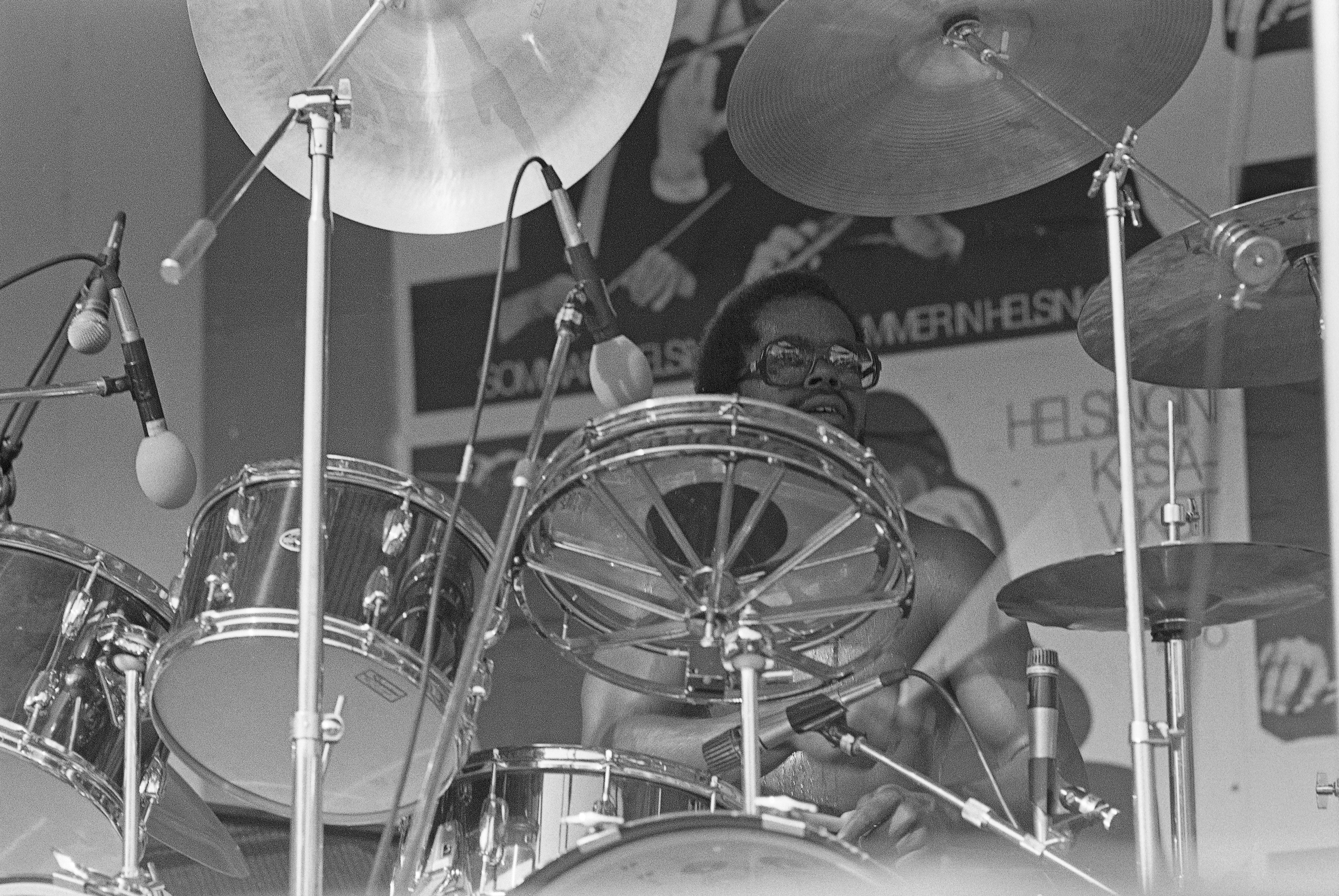
- Billy Carson
- Born: William Carson
- Occupations: Actor musician
- Notable work: Hyvät Herrat (1993–95)

William ”Billy” Holsey Carson (born August 1, 1955, San Bernardino, California) is an American actor and musician most famous in Finland.

After arriving in Rauma as a drummer in Charles Williams's band, Carson joined various Finnish bands, including The Dogs, Madame George and Jukka Tolonen's jazz band, as well as his own group Buffalo Soldiers. He also toured Europe, the US and recorded Grace Jones One Man Show with Grace Jones He also toured with Light of The World Phil Lynott.

As an actor, Carson rose to fame in Finland in the late 1980s, appearing in Yle series Hymyhuulet. He became known as waiter Samuel Livingstone Matabele in the series Hyvät Herrat. He produced several programs on Radio City, Finland's largest and first commercial music station.

After withdrawing from the public eye, Carson returned in 2000 to the United States and lived in Northridge, Los Angeles, California. He returned to Finland in 2020 during the covid-pandemic.

== Filmography ==
=== Films ===
Year	Film	Role
1987	Tropic of Ice	Charles Montgomery
1992	Vääpeli Körmy ja etelän hetelmät	An American soldier
1999	Spy Games	Cameraman

=== Television ===
Year	Film	Network	Role
1987–88	Hymyhuulet	Yle	Various
1989	Viemäri-TV	MTV3	Various
1990	Kellarikaarti	Yle	
1993–95	Hyvät herrat	MTV3	Samuel Livingstone
1997–98	Ihmeidentekijät	MTV3	Steven O'Hara
2000	Parhaat vuodet	MTV3	Steven O'Hara
2024	Konflikti	MTV3	Deputy Chief of Mission
