= Ricky Rapper and Slick Leonard =

- Directed by: Timo Koivusalo
- Written by: Sinikka Nopola; Tiina Nopola; Timo Koivusalo
- Produced by: Timo Koivusalo
- Cinematography: Pertti Mutanen
- Edited by: Jyrki Luukko; Timo Koivusalo
- Music by: Esa Nieminen
- Production company: Artista Filmi Oy
- Distributed by: Buena Vista International
- Release date: 7 February 2014
- Running time: 80 minutes
- Country: Finland
- Language: Finnish
- Budget: €1,305,000 (€450,000 from SES support)
- Box office: €2,263,250

Ricky Rapper and Slick Leonard (Finnish: Risto Räppääjä ja liukas Lennart) is a Finnish musical film released in February 2014. Directed by Timo Koivusalo, the screenplay is partly based on the books Risto Räppääjä saa isän (2011) and Risto Räppääjä ja kaksoisolento (2013) by Sinikka and Tiina Nopola.

Filming took place in the summer of 2013 at Villilä Studios in Nakkila and in the old town of Naantali. This was the fourth film in the Ricky Rapper series and marked a shift in production from Kinotar to Artista Filmi. Additionally, the entire cast was recast for this installment.

In October 2014, the film won the Best European Children's Film award at the Schlingel International Film Festival for Children and Young Audience in Germany.

== Plot ==
Aunt Elvi and Aunt Rauha devise a plan to find a suitable father figure for Ricky. However, Ricky is not thrilled with the idea, and neither is their neighbor Lennart, who has feelings for Rauha. To help Ricky, Lennart tries to create the "perfect man" who can meet Rauha's ever-changing expectations. But pretending to be multiple people at once quickly proves chaotic. When Elvi also falls for one of Lennart's personas, the situation spirals into hilarious misunderstandings and twists, making this summer unforgettable.

== Cast ==
- Samuel Shipway as Ricky Rapper
- Sanni Paatso as Nelly Noodlehead
- Vesa Vierikko as Lennart Lindberg
- Minttu Mustakallio as Rauha Rapper
- Riitta Havukainen as Elvi Rapper
- Heikki Nousiainen as School Councillor
- Hannu-Pekka Björkman as Pablo Pikasola
- Rinna Paatso as Police Officer
- Juha Laitila as Guitarist Magician
- Janne Turkki as Dog Man
- Eija Nousiainen as Councillor's Wife
