= Ja saapuu oikea yö =

- Theatrical poster
- Directed by: Jyri Kähönen
- Written by: Tuomas Parviainen
- Produced by: Aleksi Bardy
- Cinematography: Mark Stubbs
- Production company: Helsinki-filmi Oy
- Release date: 13 July 2012
- Running time: 98 minutes
- Country: Finland
- Language: Finnish

Ja saapuu oikea yö (English title: Hush) is a 2012 Finnish thriller film directed by Jyri Kähönen. The story evolves around two young lovers who plan to murder the girl's father.

== Cast ==
- Jarkko Niemi as Sakari
- Jemina Sillanpää as Veera
- Martti Suosalo as Aarne
- Kaija Pakarinen as Marja
- Antti Virmavirta as Olli
