= Tropic of Ice =

1987 Finnish film

- Finnish film poster
- Finnish: Tropic of Ice – Jään kääntöpiiri
- Directed by: Lauri Törhönen
- Based on: Jään kääntöpiiri by Juha Vakkuri
- Produced by: Kaj Holmberg
- Production company: Skandia-Filmi Oy
- Release date: 1987
- Running time: 114 minutes
- Country: Finland
- Budget: 4,327,357 mk

Tropic of Ice (Finnish: Tropic of Ice – Jään kääntöpiiri) is a 1987 Finnish spy film. It was shot in Helsinki, Olavinlinna and London. The film was directed by Lauri Törhönen, produced by Kaj Holmberg and the production company was Skandia-Filmi Oy. It is based on the novel Jään kääntöpiiri by Juha Vakkuri.

== Credited cast ==
- Tor Planting – Kai Friman
- Raimo Hallama – father
- Soli Labbart – mother
- Mats Dumell – brother
- Marja-Leena Kouki – brother'wife
- Marjut Kauppinen – brother's daughter
- Annikki Viitala – Friman's secretary
- Johanna Raunio – Claire
- Sarah Lam – Louise
- Irmeli Kangaspunta – Natasha
- Vladimir von Witte – Sergei
- Victor Thorne – David Jordan
- William Carson – captain Charles Montgomery, "Charlie", American embassy military attaché
- Neil Hardwick – Gottfried, Commercial Adviser to the Embassy of the Federal Republic of Germany
- Stig Framåt – reader
- Tim Steffa – John
- Alan Tilvern – old manager of an American company
- John Michael Paliotti – new manager of an American company
- Emily Rose Pat, secretary of American company
- Leon Herbert – robber in London
- Patrick Ward – robber in London
- Taneli Mäkelä – men with pistol
- David Barnes – London taxi driver
- Igor Turtschaninoff – Soviet Deputy Minister
- Svetlana Mäkelä – Head of the Soviet Trade Commission
- Zofia Grodzinska – translator
- Georg Pavloff – Neuvostoliiton suurlähetystön edustaja
- Juha Siltanen – Political Assistant to the Soviet Embassy
- Heinrich Bremer – German engineer
- Ibragim Aliev – Turkish technician
- Yoji Kasajima – old Japanese businessman
- Hannele Törrönen – doctor
- Julia Stepelton – Geraldine Johnson, Commercial Representative of the US Embassy
- Eddy Hawkins – US State Department Representative on TV
- Peter Abbott – owner of a London hotel
- Henry Martin – London Hotel Porter
- Peter Harborne – English engineer
- Malcolm Beddard – English economist
- Mikhail Prohorov – Soviet officer
- Mikhail Dzougoutov – Soviet officer
- Väinö Haukka – Soviet officer
- Christina Hartmann – flight officer
- Henri Purola – pastor
- Ulla Tyhjälä – cantor
- Antti Horko – customs officer
- Juuso Juntunen – photographer
- Maarit Oravala – father's girlfriend
- Jouni Flinkkilä – newsreader
- Pirjo Kauppinen – Radio 1 reporter
- Leila Kataja – Swimming pool waiter
- Jari Järvimaa – chauffeur
- Juhani Maukonen – chauffeur
- Jaakko Park – Jack, parrot
