= Hayflower and Quiltshoe =

Hayflower and Quiltshoe (Finnish: Heinähattu ja Vilttitossu) are the main characters of a children's book series written by Sinikka and Tiina Nopola. The first book in the series was published in 1989. The books have been illustrated by Markus Majaluoma and Salla Savolainen.

The Nopola sisters have mentioned that the series draws on their childhood experiences. Some events in the books are also inspired by their adult mishaps. For example, a scene in the book Hayflower and Quiltshoe Need a Holiday (Heinähattu ja Vilttitossu loman tarpeessa) is based on an incident involving Sinikka's son during a cruise. However, most of the stories are entirely fictional. The books are dialogue-heavy, as the Nopola sisters created their narratives by acting out the characters' roles; Tiina often portrayed Vilttitossu, and Sinikka played Heinähattu.

The book Hayflower, Quiltshoe and the Rubens Brothers won the Anni Swan Medal in 2003, and Hayflower, Quiltshoe and the Forbidden Flounder received the Pirkanmaan Plättä award in 2006. A Yleisradio Christmas calendar in 1993 was based on the series, and the stories have been adapted into several plays and films.

== Main characters ==
Hayflower and Quiltshoe are sisters in the Kattilakoski family. Hayflower always wears a straw hat, which is the origin of her name, while Quiltshoe is named for the felt slippers she wears to keep her feet warm. Hayflower is responsible and kind, while the lively and mischievous Quiltshoe often drags her sister into various adventures. Other family members include their mother Hanna, a homemaker; their father Matti, an impractical researcher; and their younger brother Petteri Matti Kasimir, usually referred to simply as "Boy."

Other recurring characters include the Alibullen sisters, Helga and Halise, who live on the same street and offer the girls treats and access to television. The family also interacts with the bumbling police officers Isonapa and Rillirousku and occasionally matriarchal relatives like their faraway grandparents.

== Book series ==
- Hayflower and Quiltshoe (1989)
- Hayflower, Quiltshoe and the Baby (1990)
- Hayflower, Quiltshoe and Grandpa (1991)
- Hayflower and Quiltshoe in Need of a Holiday (1992)
- Hayflower and Quiltshoe in Search of Christmas (1993)
- Hayflower and Quiltshoe in a Thief Chase (1995)
- Hayflower, Quiltshoe and Big Elsa (1997)
- Hayflower, Quiltshoe and the Rascal of Littoinen (1999)
- Hayflower, Quiltshoe and the Brothers Rubens (2001)
- Hayflower, Quiltshoe and the Dancing Constable (2003)
- Hayflower, Quiltshoe and the Forbidden Flounder (2005)
- The Twelve Moons of Hayflower and Quiltshoe (2006)
- Hayflower, Quiltshoe and Bald Koponen (2012)
- Hayflower, Quiltshoe and the Feisty Schoolchild (2013)
- Hayflower and Quiltshoe as Poets (2015)
- Hayflower, Quiltshoe and the Christmas Rascal (2017)
- Hayflower, Quiltshoe and the Silly Angel (2018)
- Hayflower, Quiltshoe and the Hen (2019)

== Plays ==
- Hayflower and Quiltshoe (Theatre 2000 and Ahaa Theatre, 1994)
- Hayflower, Quiltshoe and the Brothers Rubens (Helsinki City Theatre, 2003)
- Hayflower, Quiltshoe and the Big Bang – a children's opera by Markus Fagerudd, performed by Kapsäkki Opera and Theatre Ensemble (2003)
- Hayflower, Quiltshoe and the Rascal of Littoinen (Turku's Vartiovuori Summer Theatre, 2004)

== Television ==
| Title | Year | Director |
|---|---|---|
| Hayflower and Quiltshoe on the Trail of Christmas | 1993 | Maija Asikainen |

== Films ==
| Title | Year | Director |
|---|---|---|
| Hayflower and Quiltshoe | 2002 | Kaisa Rastimo |
| Hayflower, Quiltshoe and the Rubens Brothers | 2017 | Anna Dahlman |
| Hayflower, Quiltshoe and the Feisty First-grader | 2020 | Lenka Hellstedt |
| Hayflower, Quiltshoe and the Chicken | 2024 | Reetta Aalto |
