= Lauri Törhönen =

Finnish film director (born 1947)

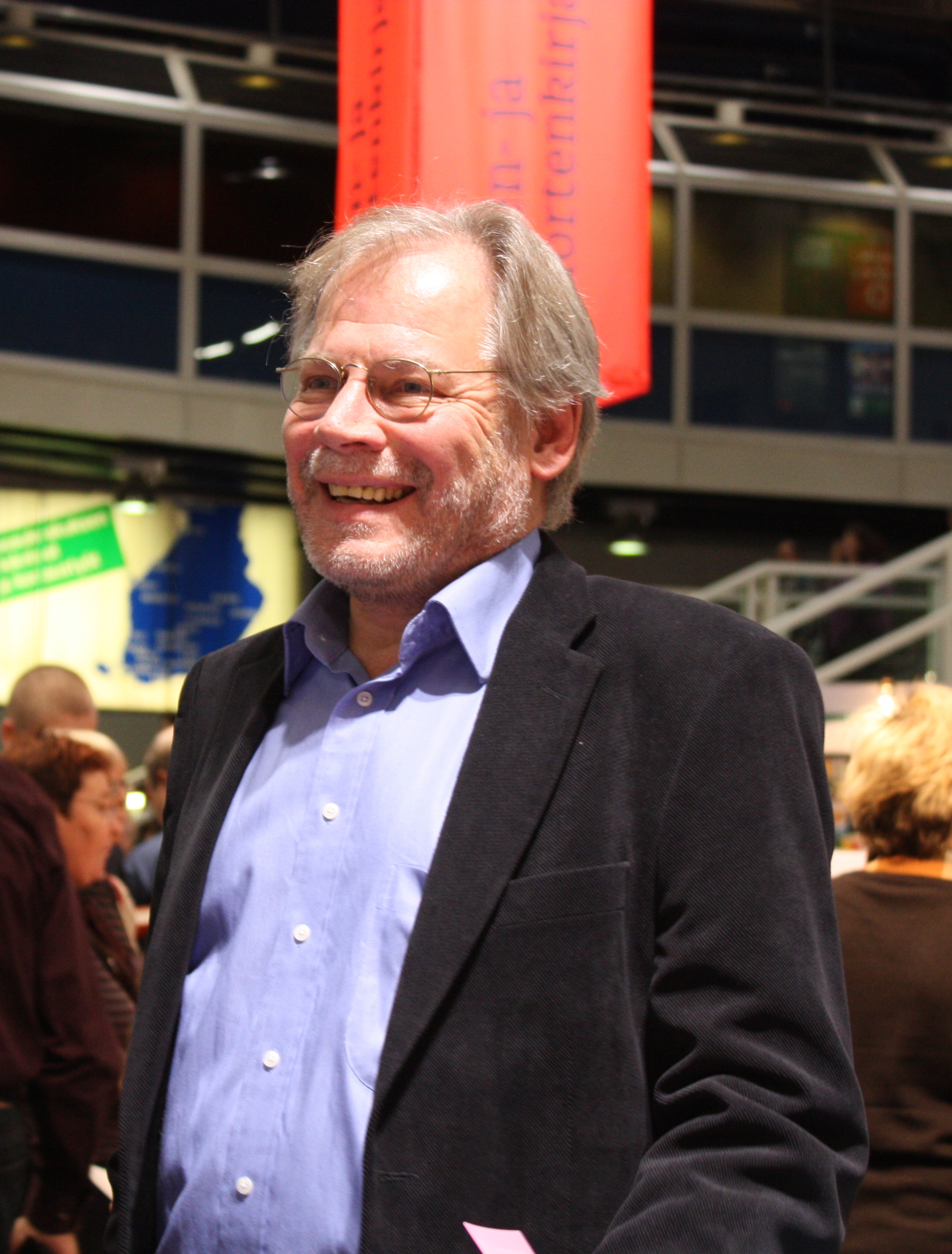
- Lauri Törhönen
- Born: August 16, 1947 (age 79); Helsinki, Finland
- Education: University of Art and Design Helsinki
- Occupations: Film Director; Professor
- Notable work: Tropic of Ice

Lauri Ilmari Törhönen (born 16 August 1947 in Helsinki, Finland) is a Finnish film director. He has directed 13 feature films including Tropic of Ice. He worked in Warren Beatty's Reds as the second assistant director, as well as in Gorky Park by Michael Apted.

Törhönen worked as a professor of film art at the University of Art and Design Helsinki.

In January 2018, the Finnish national broadcasting service Yleisradio published news of accusations of sexual harassment against Törhönen. The accusations were made by around 20 women and contain events from the 1980s to the 2000s. Later, Törhönen published a brief press release where he apologised his behaviour. In a television interview some weeks later, he acknowledged some bad behaviour but denied any allegations of serious sexual harassment.

Törhönen's doctoral thesis was rejected by the University of Lapland after public outcry over the total lack of scientific character. Also, the public defence was mocked as ridiculous.

== Partial filmography ==
- The Undressing (Riisuminen, 1986)
- Tropic of Ice (Tropic of Ice – Jään kääntöpiiri, 1987)
- Insiders (1989)
- Paradise America (Ameriikan raitti, 1990)
- Abandoned Houses, Empty Homes (Hylätyt talot, autiot pihat, 2000)
- The Border (Raja 1918, 2007)
- The Girls of April (Vares – Huhtikuun tytöt, 2011)
- Garter Snake (Vares – Sukkanauhakäärme, 2011)
- Vares – Uhkapelimerkki (2012)
- Tango of Darkness (Vares – Pimeyden tango, 2012)

== Awards ==
- 1989 and 2007 Film Prize of the State of Finland
- 2001 OCIC Award
