= The Undressing (film) =

1986 Finnish drama film

- Riisuminen
- Directed by: Lauri Törhönen
- Written by: Lauri Törhönen
- Based on: Riisuminen by Raija Oranen
- Produced by: Jörn Donner
- Starring: Erkki Saarela; Eeva Eloranta
- Cinematography: Esa Vuorinen
- Edited by: Tuula Mehtonen
- Music by: Heikki Harma
- Production company: Jörn Donner Productions
- Release date: February 21, 1986
- Running time: 87 minutes
- Country: Finland
- Language: Finnish

The Undressing (Finnish: Riisuminen) is a 1986 Finnish drama film directed by Lauri Törhönen. The film premiered on 21 February 1986. It tells the story of a left-wing cabinet minister (played by Erkki Saarela), who spends a night in a hotel room with his former lover and ideological workmate from his youth (played by Eeva Eloranta). Amid undressing and sex, the two discuss personal and ideological issues.

The film is based on the successful stage play of the same name by Raija Oranen, which premiered at the Tampere Theatre Festival in 1984. According to Oranen, her inspiration came from a tabloid headline concerning Minister Matti Ahde, which later turned out to be completely unfounded. Jörn Donner purchased the film rights to the play for 5,000 Finnish markka and offered the project to Törhönen, who rewrote the story extensively. Oranen was dissatisfied with the final result and publicly distanced herself from the film.

The music for The Undressing was composed and performed by Hector. A single record was planned but never released. The film opens with a short film titled Excerpts from the Finnish Constitution, in which Jörn Donner reads passages from the 1919 Finnish Constitution.
