= Joonas Nordman =

Finnish actor (born 1986)

Joonas Matti Nordman (born 9 July 1986, in Pori, Finland) is a Finnish actor, comedian, impersonator, director and screenwriter, best known as an actor and a director of popular Finnish sketch comedy television show Putous (2014–2015, 2017–2018). He is also one of the cast members in the Finnish sketch comedy television show Pyjama Party (2014–2016).

== Career ==
In 2011–2014, Nordman was one of the comedians in the Finnish political satire YleLeaks. He is also known as an impersonator. Nordman has impersonated and parodied several famous Finnish politicians, such as Sauli Niinistö, Juha Sipilä, Antti Rinne, Jussi Halla-aho, Ville Niinistö, Jussi Niinistö, Harry Harkimo, Juhana Vartiainen, Matti Vanhanen, Timo Soini, Paavo Arhinmäki, Simon Elo, Touko Aalto and Ilkka Kanerva. His own imitation television series Pelimies began on MTV3 in 2016.

Nordman is the Finnish voice actor of Moomintroll in the Finnish-British animated television family drama Moominvalley (2019–).

== Filmography ==
=== As an actor, comedian, and host ===
==== Films ====
- 2001: Young Love as Jukka
- 2015: Lapland Odyssey 2 as Sekis
- 2017: Hayflower, Quiltshoe and the Rubens Brothers as Matti Kattilakoski
- 2020: Hayflower, Quiltshoe and the Feisty First-grader as Matti Kattilakoski
- 2021: The Potato as Untamo
- 2022: Weddings Before Funerals as Pastor
- 2023: Spede as Ere Kokkonen

==== Short films ====
- 2002: Hunting with Dad as Son

==== Television ====
- 2001: The House of Unlimited Time as Himself
- 2005: Ojat on rajat as Veli
- 2011: Krisse’s Election Grill as Himself
- 2011–2014: YleLeaks as Himself
- 2013: Once a Week (Kerran viikossa) as Priest
- 2013: The Truth About Love as Narrator
- 2013, 2016, 2019: News Leak as Himself
- 2014–2017: Siskonpeti as Various roles
- 2014–2015: Putous as Various roles
- 2014: Kimmo as Topi Törnqvist
- 2014: Justimus Presents: F*** the Police as Record Label Boss
- 2015: Nurses as Henri
- 2016–2017: Pelimies as Various roles
- 2016: Roba as Urinating Man
- 2017: Ankeinen’s Christmas Greeting as Aimo
- 2018, 2023: Sunday Lunch as Mikko, a men’s rights activist
- 2018: The Emperor of Aarnio as Mikko Koskiranta
- 2019–2022: Adults as Suit Man
- 2019: The Duke of Sipoo as SuomiAreena Host
- 2020–: The Joonas Nordman Show as Himself, Host
- 2020: Putous Allstars as Host, Various roles
- 2022–: The Joonas Nordman Show: BBQ Season as Himself, Roastmaster
- 2022: Goldfish as Group Leader
- 2022: Dear Children as Edvin
- 2023: Snackmasters Finland as Host
- 2023: This Is This as Himself, Team Captain
- 2023: The World of Jarkko Tamminen

=== As a screenwriter ===
==== Television ====
- 2011–2016: YleLeaks (also head writer)
- 2012: Harjakainen and Piisinen's Renovation
- 2012: Enbuske & Linnanahde Crew
- 2014–2017: Siskonpeti
- 2014–2018: Putous
- 2016–2017: Pelimies (head writer)
- 2017: Ankeinen’s Christmas Greeting (TV film)
- 2020–: The Joonas Nordman Show (head writer)
- 2021: The Best of Putous
- 2021: The Herd
- 2022–: The Joonas Nordman Show: BBQ Season

=== As a director ===
==== Television ====
- 2017–2018: Putous
- 2017: Ankeinen’s Christmas Greeting (TV film)
- 2021: The Best of Putous
- 2021: Tanhupallo’s Own Show
- 2021: The Herd
