= Modern Men (TV series) =

2019 Finnish TV series

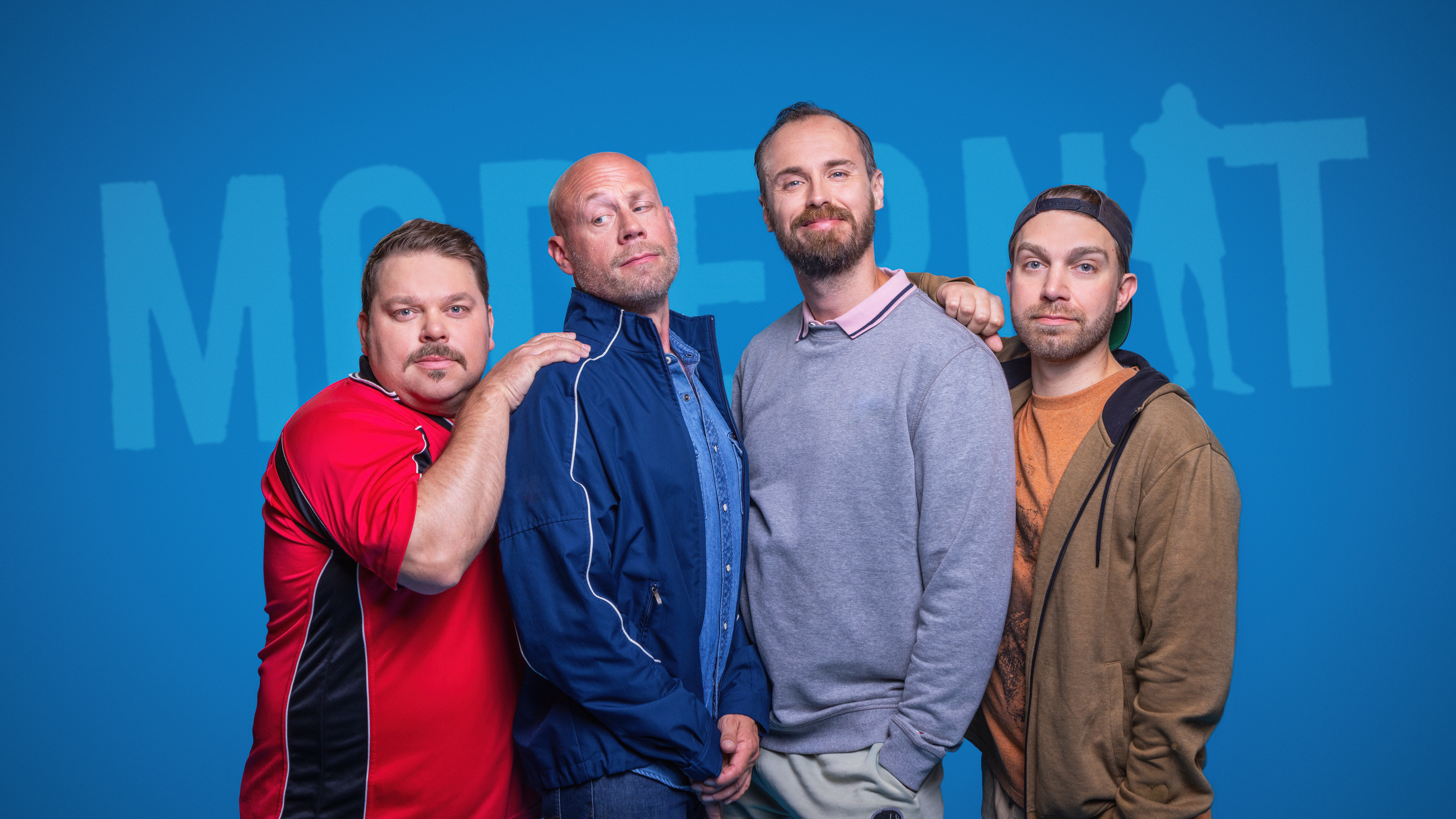
- Genre: Comedy, Drama
- Written by: Pirjo Heikkilä (Season 1); Jäppi Savolainen (Seasons 1, 4); Timo Varpio (Season 1); Anna Brotkin (Season 1); John Lundsten (Season 1); Jarno Lindemark (Seasons 2–4); Sarri Schonert (Seasons 2–4); Topi Koljonen (Season 2); Janne Sarja (Season 2); Tuukka Vartiainen (Seasons 3–4); Hanna-Mari Mantere (Season 4)
- Directed by: Jäppi Savolainen (Seasons 1–4); Juha Pursiainen (Season 2)
- Starring: Eero Milonoff (Seasons 1–3); Iikka Forss; Jarkko Niemi; Tommi Rantamäki; Mikko Töyssy (Season 4)
- Country of origin: Finland
- No. of seasons: 4
- No. of episodes: 46

Production
- Producers: Leena Puurtinen (Seasons 1–3); Tuire Lindström (Yle, Season 1); Teppo Hovi (Yle, Season 2); Tuukka Vartiainen (Season 4); Riina Kullas (Seasons 1–4); Mari Kinnunen (Seasons 2–4); Teppo Hovi (Yle, Seasons 3–4)
- Cinematography: Juge Heikkilä (Seasons 1–4)
- Editors: Henri Andersson (Seasons 1–4); Aleksi Raij (Season 1); Liisa Vartiainen (Seasons 2–4)
- Running time: 23 minutes
- Production company: Moskito Television

Original release
- Network: Yle TV2, Yle Areena
- Release: 2019 – present

Modern Men (Finnish: Modernit miehet) is a Finnish dramedy television series starring Eero Milonoff, Iikka Forss, Jarkko Niemi, and Tommi Rantamäki. The series follows four "ironically modern" men navigating problems, prejudices, and insecurities in today's world.

The first season premiered on Yle Areena on January 6, 2019, and aired on television from January to March 2019. The second season premiered on Yle Areena on March 25, 2020, alongside its television debut. The third season was released on December 8, 2021. The fourth season debuted on January 16, 2024, with Mikko Töyssy joining the cast and Eero Milonoff departing.

== Main cast ==
- Eero Milonoff - Jarkko (Seasons 1–3)
- Iikka Forss - Matti
- Jarkko Niemi - Pete
- Tommi Rantamäki - Tuomas
- Matleena Kuusniemi - Taina
- Kirsi Ylijoki - Riitta
- Milka Ahlroth - Tuulikki
- Jenni Banerjee - Pihla
