= Jarkko Niemi (actor) =

Finnish actor

Jarkko Niemi (born 30 October 1984, in Tuusula) is a Finnish actor.

== Selected filmography ==
=== Films ===
- Young Gods (2003)
- Glass Jaw (2004)
- Kamome Shokudo (2006)
- One Foot Under (2009)
- Forbidden Fruit (2009)
- Let My People Go! (2011)
- Risto (2011)
- Ja saapuu oikea yö (2012)
- 21 tapaa pilata avioliitto (2013)

=== Television ===
- Nymphs (2014)
- Syke (2014)
- Modern Men (2019)
