= Olli Haikka =

CEO of Yellow Film & TV corporation and an executive producer

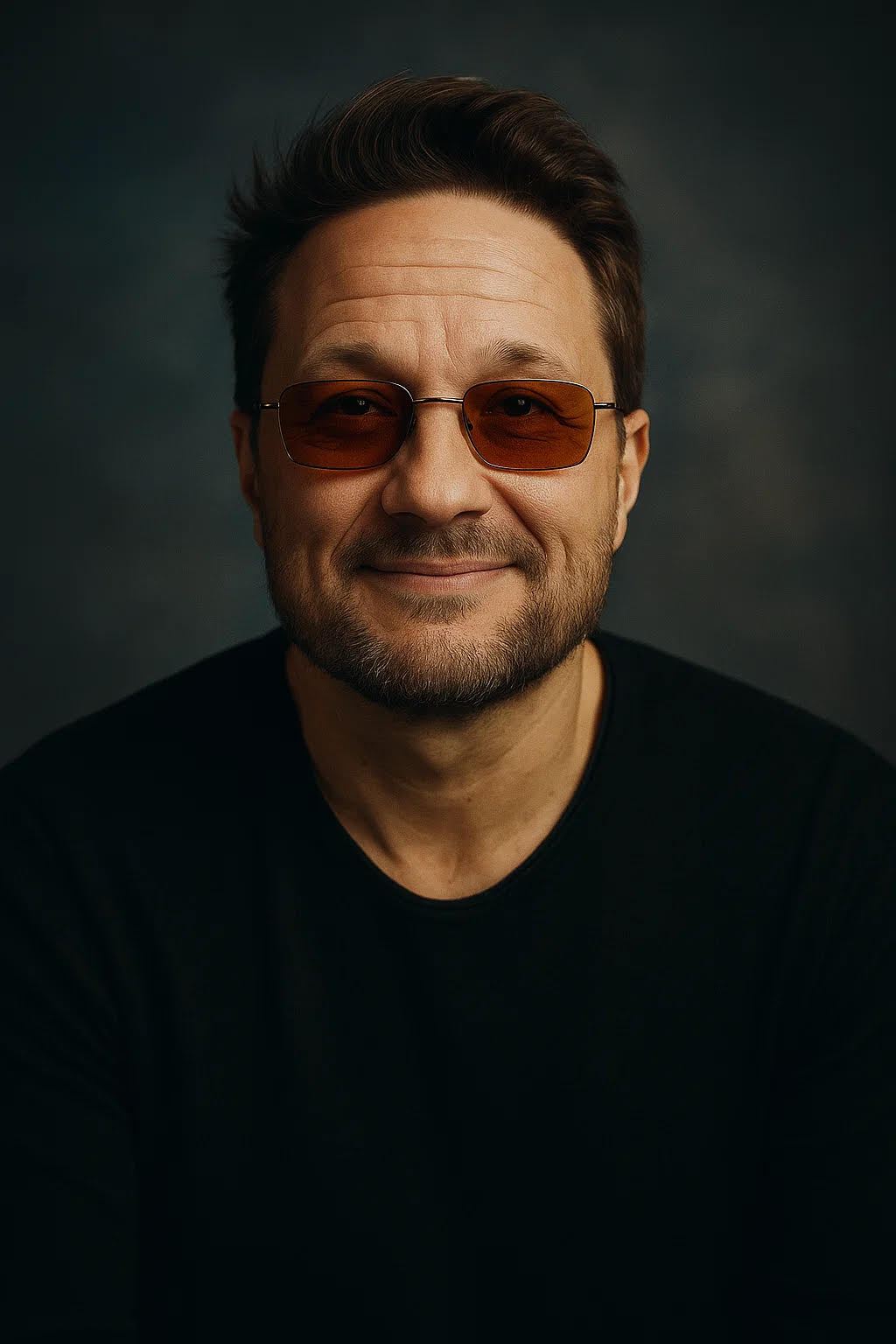
- Born: 4 June 1966 (age 59)
- Occupation: Executive producer
- Title: Group CEO of Reinvent Yellow
- Website: www.reinventyellow.com

Olli Haikka (born 4 June 1966) is a Finnish producer, writer, investor and media executive, widely recognized as a key figure in the development and internationalization of the Nordic audiovisual industry. He is a member of the Producers Guild of America (PGA) and holds more than 200 producer and writer credits on IMDb.

He served for many years as CEO and Creative Director of Yellow Film & TV, and since 2025 has been Group CEO of Reinvent Yellow, a newly formed Nordic production, sales, and financing group.

Haikka began his career in the early 1990s as a screenwriter, producer, and documentarian, earning recognition at the Tampere Film Festival, where he won the main audience award.

Until 2007 he was COO of Filmiteollisuus Fine Oy, which later merged into Yellow Film & TV, leading to his appointment as CEO. He led Yellow Film & TV and its group structure from 2008 until 2024, after which he became CEO of Yellow Film Studios Oy. Following the 2025 merger of Yellow Film with Danish company REinvent, he was appointed CEO of the new pan-Nordic group Reinvent Yellow.

On the creative side, Haikka has been closely involved in many of Finland’s most successful television and film productions. His credits include:

Itse Valtiaat (2001), the world’s first weekly animated political satire (creator, writer, producer), Putous and Elämäni Biisi (executive producer), Arctic Circle / Ivalo (creator, executive producer), Syke, the long-running hospital drama (executive producer), The Lapland Odyssey / Napapiirin sankarit four film franchise (2010, 2015, 2017, 2022), and comedy series including MS Romantic(2019), Sunnuntailounas (2018), Kimmo (2012-2017), and Pasila (2007-2013). He was co-producer of award-winning Borg vs McEnroe (2017)

Haikka has won multiple Venla-awards, Telvis-awards and Media & Message -awards. He has also received the Jussi Award in 2006 for Tyttö sinä olet tähti / Beauty and the Bastard (2005).

As an executive, he has played a central role in exporting Finnish content, developing new financing and distribution models, and expanding co-production activity. Under his leadership, Yellow Film & TV grew into the largest independent production company in the Nordic region.

Haikka has also been active in industry organizations, serving as Chair of Satu ry (the predecessor of APFI) and of the Finnish Television Academy.
