= Eero Paloheimo =

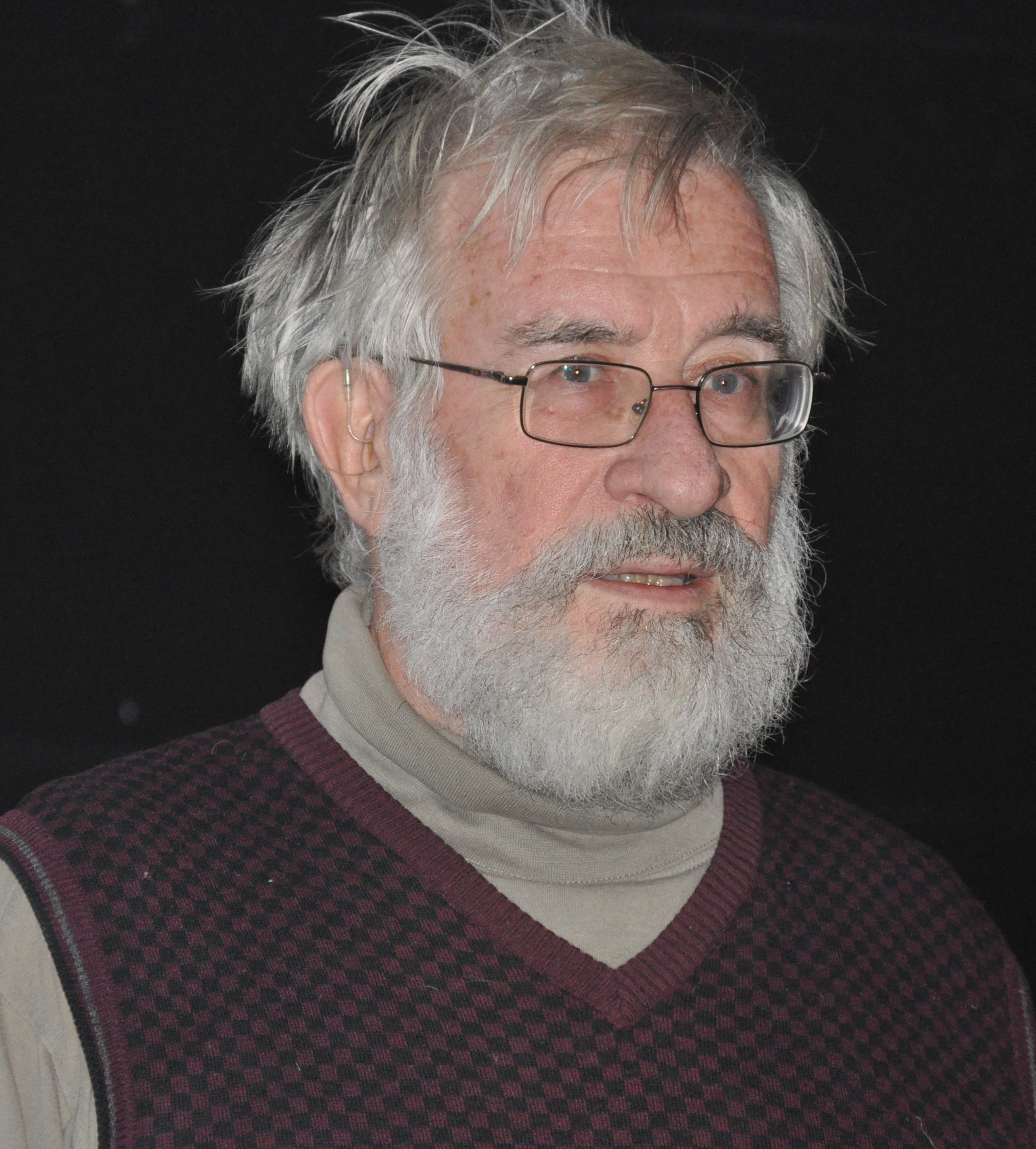
Eero Paloheimo in 2010

Eero Kalervo Paloheimo (born 14 June 1936, in Helsinki) is a Finnish designer, politician and university professor.

Paloheimo was a Green Party representative in the Finnish Parliament from 1987 until 1995 and, during his final year in the Parliament, Chairman of the Committee of Long–Term Future Options. Paloheimo was also a professor for the Helsinki University of Technology from his resignation until the year 2000.

Eero Paloheimo has been engaged in ecological living for many years and is the founder and owner of Eero Paloheimo Ecocity Ltd. He is currently involved in the development of a new Finnish traffic system.

In 2015 Paloheimo and professor U.B. Lindström launched Unite The Armies -campaign, which aims to stop the deterioration of global environment and to set militaries a new mission to defend people against gradual disasters.

== Education ==
Eero Paloheimo has both a Doctorate of Engineering from the Technical University of Munich and a Doctor of Philosophy from Helsinki University of Technology.

== Books ==
Paloheimo has written several books and some have been translated into English.

- Tämä on Afrikka, (This is Africa), WSOY (2007)
- Struktuuri, (The Structure), Terra Cognita (2004)
- Megaevoluutio, (The Megaevolution), WSOY (2002)
- Syntymättömien sukupolvien Eurooppa, (The Way Towards a New Europe), WSOY (1996)
- Välit selviksi — ja joka suuntaan, (A Blow in All Directions), WSOY (1991)
- Maan tie, (The Earth's Path), WSOY (1989)
- Maa, (The Earth), WSOY (1985)
- Suomi — mahdollinen maa, (Finland – a Possible Country), WSOY (1981)
- Maailma — alustava luonnos, (The World – a Preliminary Draft), WSOY (1977)
