= Telvis =

Telvis is a Finnish television award presented by the Katso magazine. The recipient is chosen by a vote by Katso readers. As of 2006, Telvis has been awarded 44 times (from 1962), making it the oldest television award in Finland. The Telvis statue has been designed by artist Olavi Hurmerinta.

== Award categories ==
- Finnish male performer
- Finnish female performer
- Drama
- Entertainment
- Reality
- Lifestyle
- Non-fiction
- Sports
- Radio voice

There used to be five Telvis categories: male TV performer, female TV performer, radio voice, Special Telvis, and best TV show. The current nine categories were established in the 2004 Telvis event.

In 2006, best female performer Telvis was awarded to stand-up comedian Krisse Salminen. The "Color spot of the year" award was given to Conan O'Brien, who was visiting Finland. Best Finnish male performer Telvis was awarded to Risto Kaskilahti. Mikko Peltola was awarded for his radio voice.
