= Milla Bruneau =

Finnish television producer and director

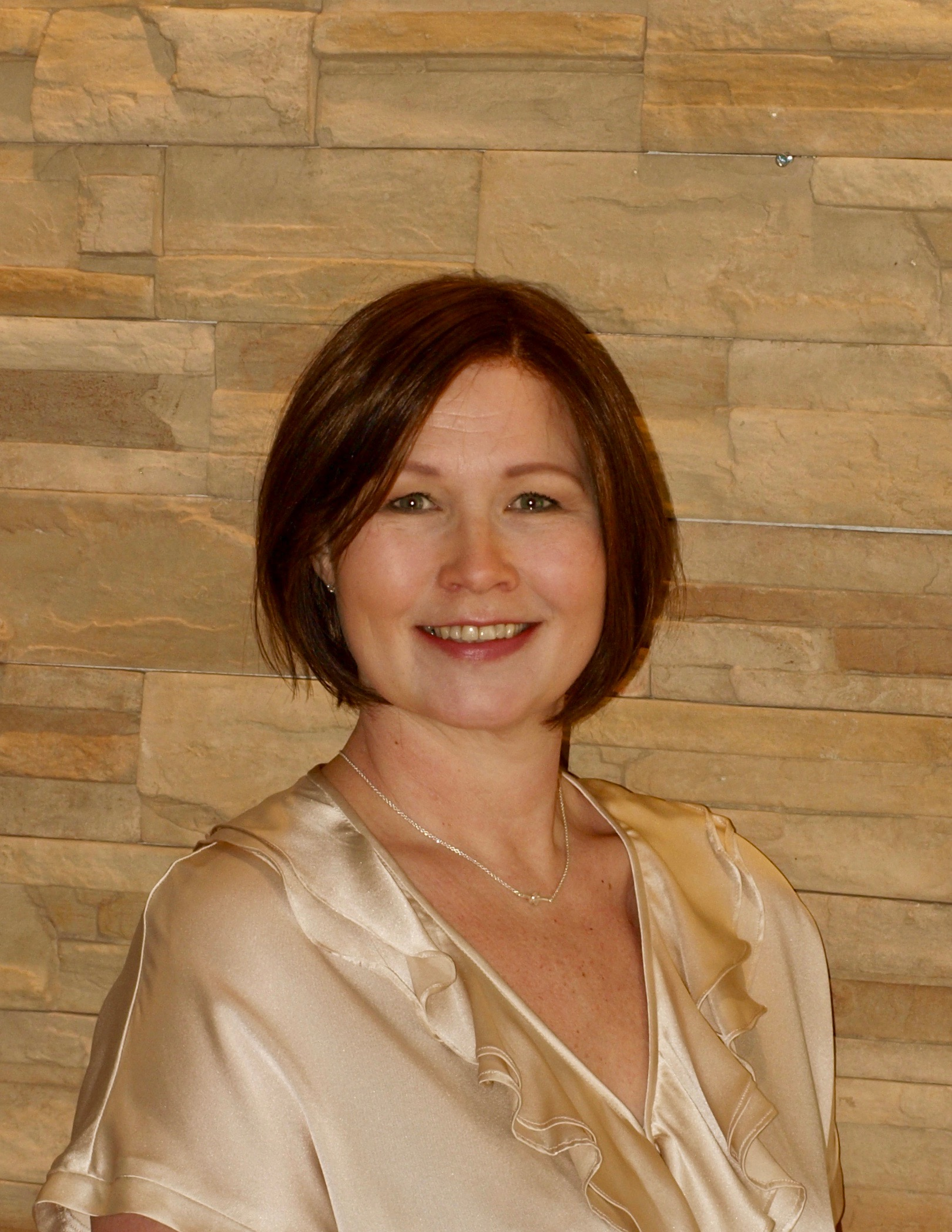
- Born: 9 November 1972 (age 53)
- Occupations: TV Producer, Business Leader and Politician.

Milla Bruneau (born 1972) is a Finnish entertainment industry TV producer and director. She served as an Executive Producer for Yellow Film & TV until autumn 2018 and thereafter as a board member, advisor and shareholder. She is also a municipal politician in Lahti.

Before joining Yellow Film & TV, Bruneau acted as the MD and EP at Metronome/Shine Finland. Prior to that, she worked as an EP at Fremantle Media.

Mrs. Bruneau has been working in media for 20 years. She took the position of COO for Yellow Film & TV in 2013 and her responsibilities include the daily operations of the company, the international strategy, communications and HR. Bruneau has acted as the EP for both scripted and non-scripted original series like Downshifters, Nurses, Roba, Comedy Combat and Superstars Only. Before Yellow Film & TV she acted as the EP for number of international formats like Pop Idol, The Block, Under Construction, The Apprentice, Clash of the Choirs, Got to Dance, Big Brother, Master Chef etc.
