= Rita Tainola =

Finnish reporter (born 1954)

Rita Hannele Tainola-Tapiovaara (born December 7, 1954), known professionally as Rita Tainola, is a Finnish reporter.

== Career ==
Rita Tainola began her career as a journalist in 1978 when she started to work for a Finnish magazine called Eeva. In 1980, she started working for a newspaper called Ilta-Sanomat. After eight years in Ilta-Sanomat, Rita Tainola moved to Beverly Hills, California. She continued to work for many Finnish papers and magazines. In 1991 she moved back to Finland and was hired by Seura magazine in 1994. In 1997, Tainola returned to Ilta-Sanomat and became a correspondent for the paper.

As a reporter Rita Tainola has met multiple opinion leaders, politicians, members of the royal family and stars from all around the world and has also earned a celebrity status herself. In 1993, Tainola was knighted by king Hussein of Jordan. The late king Hussein awarded Tainola for her charity work helping underprivileged children in Jordan. In 2004, Tainola received a golden medal for merit of The Disabled War Veterans' Association (of Finland). In 2007, Rita Tainola received a journalist prize from Ilta-Sanomat for her public relations and "uncompromising, wide-ranging work for the news". In 2009, Tarja Halonen, the incumbent President of Finland, awarded Rita Tainola a decoration from the Order of the Lion of Finland for her charity work and developing the relations between Finland and the Middle East, especially Qatar. Rita Tainola is the president of the Finnish Qatari Association.

== Personal life ==
Rita Tainola's father's side of the family is from Russia and her mother's side is from Karelia. Rita Tainola lives in Helsinki, Finland. She is married.
