= Leif Salmén =

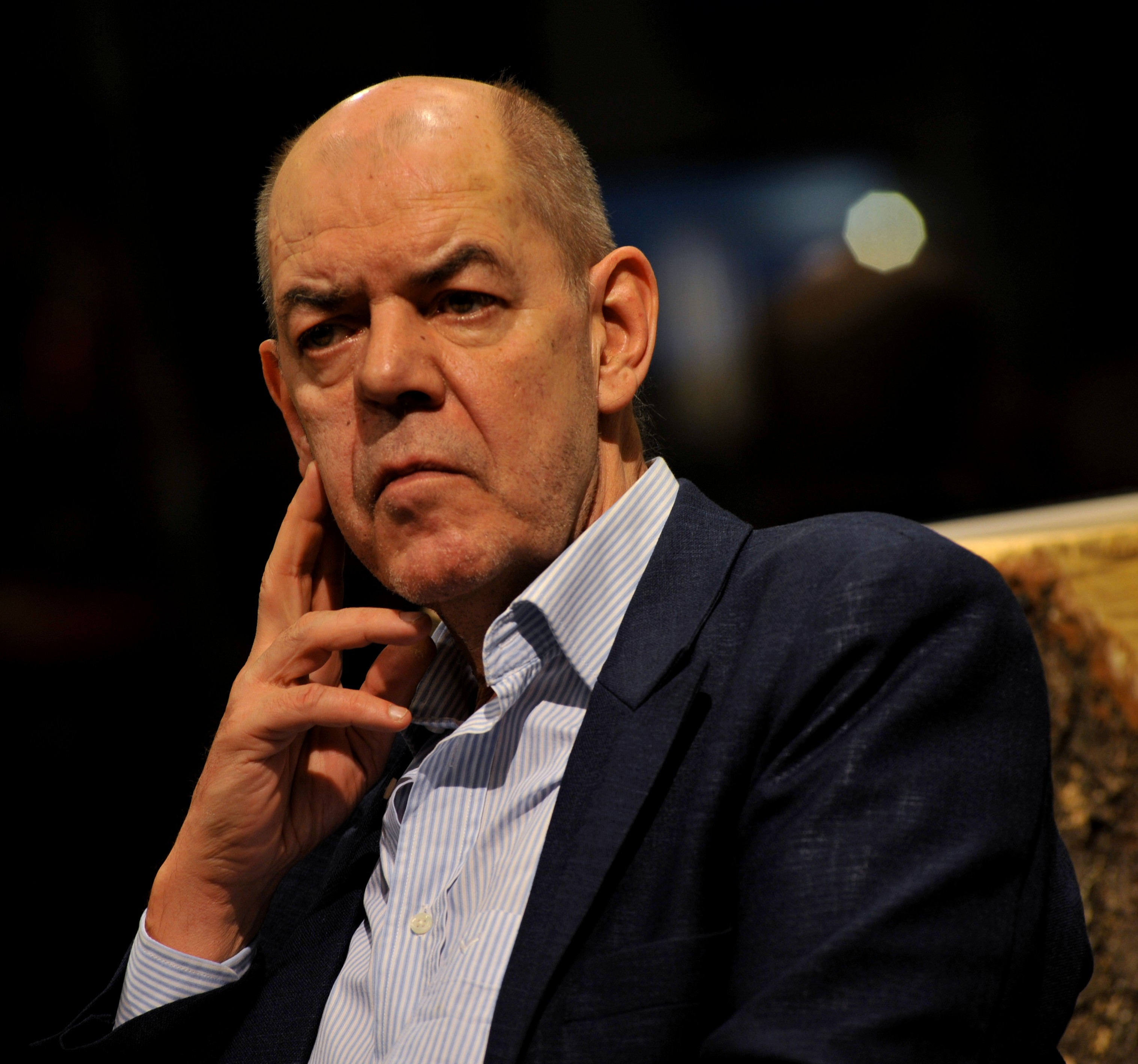
- Leif Salmén in 2012
- Born: 19 January 1952; Helsinki
- Died: 19 November 2019 (aged 67); Helsinki
- Education: Graduated upper secondary school (1971)
- Occupations: Journalist, author
- Spouse: Maria Romantschuk (m. 1979)
- Writing career
- Language: Swedish
- Years active: 1976–2017
- Genres: Poetry, essays

Leif Henry Salmén (19 January 1952 – 19 November 2019) was a Finnish author, journalist and poet. His parents were pharmacists Ture Salmen and Raili Brotell.

== Career ==
Between 1966 and 1971, Salmén worked various jobs, including as an office clerk and as a port, metal and sawmill worker. Salmén studied at Helsinki University with philosophy as his major between 1971 and 1976. During this period, he also began his media career, working as a freelance journalist from 1969 to 1976, for the Finnish News Agency (STT) from 1973 to 1975, and as a production manager at Lilla Teatern in 1975. He was a member of the Communist Party of Finland from the 1970s until mid-1980s. Salmén was a Taistoist.

Salmén was a TV journalist working for Yleisradio from 1976 to 1989. He worked for the Swedish-language news service TV-Nytt from 1978 and became a political journalist in 1980. He was among the best-known media personalities in Finland in the 1980s because of his rapid-fire interviews and uncompromised grilling of politicians and the elite.

After that Salmén worked as a columnist, essayist and a poet. Several of his books were translated into Finnish. Among other honours, Salmén received the Eino Leino Prize in 2013.

== Works ==
- Vår korta stund tillsammans. Söderström, 1976
- Att varje dag. Söderström, 1978
- Begäret. Söderström, 1980
- Lähdön jäljet. 1980 (as Swedish text contributor; original text by Paavo Rintala)
- Dans och tystnad. Söderström, 1982
- Finländsk bokföring: Dagbok från tredje republiken. Söderström, 1983
- Popocatepetl. 1983
- Ikon. Söderström, 1986
- Vintermonolog: Dagbok från tredje republiken. Söderström, 1987
- Duvorna på Plaza Real. Söderström, 1990
- Livet i förorten. Söderström, 1992
- Fjärde republiken: Oregelbundna anteckningar. Söderström, 1994
- Men Marx menade motsatsen. Söderström, 1996
- Promenader i Leninparken. Söderström, 2000
- Palatset vid Bosporen: Essäer. Söderström, 2005
- Ner från Akropolis. Söderström, 2008
- Den underjordiska moskén. Schildts & Söderströms, 2013
- Det orientaliska rummet. Förlaget, 2017
