= Donna Paukku =

Finnish television series

- Genre: Satire
- Starring: Maria Sid
- Country of origin: Finland

Original release
- Network: MTV3
- Release: 2006 – 2007

Related
- Hyvät herrat

Donna Paukku is a Finnish satirical television series. It first aired on Finnish TV in 2006 and last aired in 2007. Donna Paukku is a sequel to the series Hyvät herrat (1990–1996) and Herrat nauraa (1999). The series stars Maria Sid.

== See also ==
- List of Finnish television series
