= Maria Sid =

Finnish actress (born 1968)

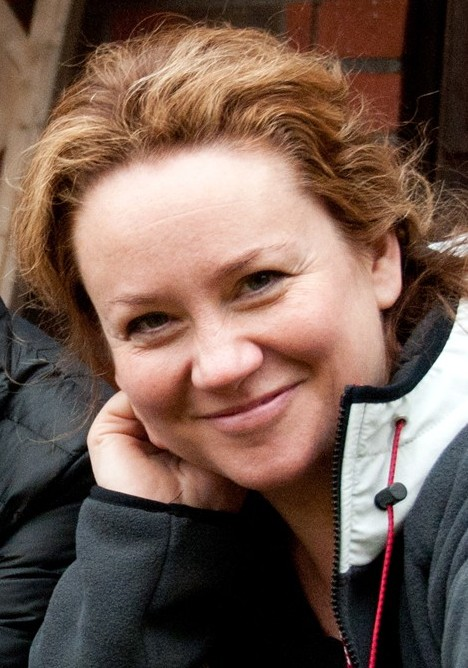
- Born: 13 May 1968 (age 58); Finland
- Occupation: Actress

Maria Sid-Achrén (née Maria Sid, born 13 May 1968) is a Finnish actress. She is best known for her role in the Finnish satire television program Donna Paukku. Sid lives and works in Finland and Sweden. She was appointed director of Stockholm City Theatre in 2019. She played Anna Valli in Musta valo. In 2024, she won a Best Actress Kristallen for her performance as Isa Stenberg in the Swedish drama series Smärtpunkten.

== Filmography ==
- Akvaariorakkaus (1993) .... Morsian
- Nainen kedolla (2003) .... Liisa Veräjä
- Operation Stella Polaris (2003) .... Anna Höglund
- Fling (2004) .... Camilla
- Onnen varjot (2005) .... Nainen luokkajuhlissa
- Reunion (2015) .... vastaanottovirkailija

== Television ==
- Kätevä emäntä (2004)
- Vasikantanssi (2004) .... Minna Vuorinen
- Kirkkaalta taivaalta (2006) .... Mimmu
- Donna Paukku (2006–2007) .... Donna Paukku
- Karjalan kunnailla (2007, 2009) .... Kirsti Miettinen
- The Moomins (2007–2008) .... Moominmamma (Swedish version)
- Livet i Fagervik (2008) .... Annika
- Crimes of Passion (2013)
- Moomins on the Riviera (2014) .... Moominmamma (Finnish/Swedish versions)
- Moomins and the Winter Wonderland (2017) .... Moominmamma (Finnish version)
- All the Sins (2019)
- Moominvalley (2019) .... Moominmamma (Swedish version)
- A Good Family (2022)
- Smärtpunkten (2024)
