= Krisse Salminen =

Finnish comedian, television presenter, actress (born 1976)

- Born: Heidi Kristiina Salminen; 28 May 1976 (age 49); Hollola, Finland
- Other names: Krisse
- Occupations: stand-up comedian, actor, talk-show host
- Awards: Telvis 2003 Best TV Actress; Venla 2003 Best Performer; Telvis 2004 Best TV Actress; Telvis 2005 Best TV Actress

Krisse Salminen (born Heidi Kristiina Salminen; 28 May 1976) is a Finnish stand-up comedian and television talkshow host.

== Biography ==
Salminen is the daughter of game show host Reijo Salminen. Her comedy routine is to present herself as a stuck-up, self-centered blonde girl, speaking an exaggerated, urban, Helsinki-style nasal accent.

She made an appearance in the Eurovision Song Contest 2007 as a guest host and green room reporter. She has appeared on TV shows such as called Krisse Show, Krisse Road Show and the 2012 series of Tanssii tähtien kanssa, the Finnish version of Strictly Come Dancing. In it, she was partnered with Matti Puro and she won with just 57% of the vote.

== Awards ==
- Telvis (2003): Best TV actress
- Venla (2003): Best performer
- Telvis (2004): Best TV actress
- Telvis (2005): Best TV actress

== Filmography ==
=== TV series ===
- Krisse (2004–2005)
- Krisse Show (2006–2007)
- Krisse Road Show (2007)
- Röyhkeä diplomaatti (2007)
- Ne Salmiset (2009–2010)
- Krissen vaaligrilli (2011–)
- YleLeaks (2013)

=== Films ===
- Robots (2005) (Finnish voice of Piper)
- Keisarin salaisuus (2006) (voice)
- Shrek the Third (2007) (Finnish voice of Snow White)
- Toy Story 3 (2010) (Finnish voice of Barbie)
