= Yellow Film & TV =

Finnish film and television production company

Yellow Film & TV Ltd. (Finnish: Yellow Film & TV Oy) is a Finnish film and television production company. It is the leading independent production company in the Nordic countries. The company specializes in movies, drama, comedy, entertainment, sports and reality TV. It has received multiple awards during the 2000s.

The CEO and executive producer of Yellow Film & TV is Olli Haikka. The COO is Tomi Paajanen and CFO is Jorma Reinilä. Riku Riihilahti has been the Head of International Sales since autumn 2018. Head of Feature Films is Jarkko Hentula and Head of Entertainment Suvi Oja-Heiniemi. Yellow Film & TV was founded in 2008 as a parent company to Filmiteollisuus Fine Ab.

Yellow Film & TV has engaged in mergers and acquisitions in the 2010s, and has set up and sold subsidiaries. The company's recent works have been the live comedy show Comedy Combat, dramas Nurses and Roba, and the movies S8länne, Lapland Odyssey and Supercool. Arctic Circle is Finland's largest television production and a major step for Yellow Film & TV into the international market.
