= Sinikka Nopola =

Finnish writer (1953–2021)

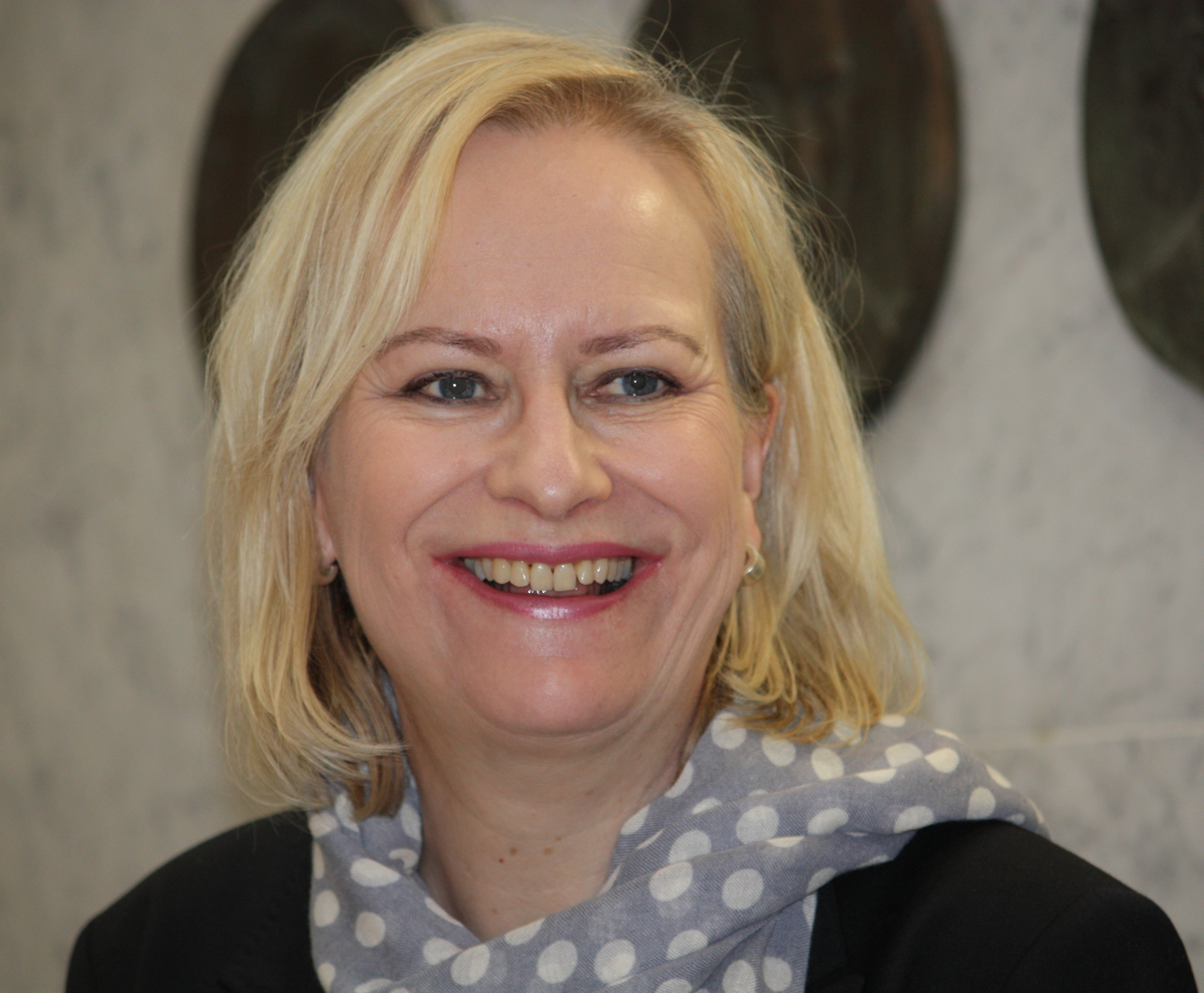
- Sinikka Nopola in 2012
- Born: 26 November 1953; Helsinki, Finland
- Died: 13 January 2021 (aged 67); Helsinki, Finland
- Occupations: Writer, journalist
- Writing career
- Language: Finnish
- Notable work: Ricky Rapper

Sinikka Marianna Nopola (26 November 1953 – 13 January 2021) was a Finnish writer of children's literature who published nearly 80 books since 1987. Nopola is best known for the series Hayflower and Quiltshoe and Ricky Rapper she wrote with her sister Tiina Nopola.

As a pacifier, Nopola came up in the monthly supplement of Helsingin Sanomat. Three collections have been published since 1997 of his pins. In his texts, Nopola can grasp the details that he develops strange general laws, for example, when words are, and of course adventure and develops mutual romance. As Nopola's pacifier, he tries to experience things that are considered important and valued, but fails in his efforts. He feels he has stayed on the beach when others experience things.

Nopola was born in Helsinki and raised in Tampere. She worked as a journalist for the newspaper Helsingin Sanomat from 1979 to 1985 when she became a freelance writer. Nopola died of a prolonged illness in January 2021.
