= Tiina Nopola =

Finnish author (born 1955)

Kirsti Tiina Orvokki Nopola (born 5 September 1955 in Helsinki) is a Finnish author of children's literature, best known for her work with her sister Sinikka Nopola on the series Hayflower and Quiltshoe, and Ricky Rapper.
