= Erkki =

Estonian and Finnish male given name

- Gender: Male
- Languages: Estonian, Finnish
- Name day: 18 May

Origin
- Region of origin: Estonia, Finland

Other names
- Related names: Erik, Eerik, Eerikki, Erich, Erki, Eero
- Popularity: see popular names

Erkki is a Finnish and Estonian given name (derived from Erik). Notable people with the name include:

== A–K ==
- Erkki Aadli (born 1974), Estonian orienteer
- Erkki Aaltonen (1910–1990), Finnish composer
- Erkki Ala-Könni (1911– 1996), Finnish ethnomusicologist
- Erkki Bahovski (born 1970), Estonian journalist
- Erkki Ertama (1927-2010), Finnish composer and conductor
- Erkki Hartikainen (1942–2021), Finnish atheist activist and educator
- Erkki Haukipuro (1921- 2001), Finnish politician
- Erkki Hautamäki (1930–2023), Finnish military major and historian
- Erkki Huttunen (1901–1956), Finnish architect
- Erkki Junkkarinen (1929-2008), Finnish singer
- Erkki Kaila (1867–1944), Finnish Lutheran Archbishop of Turku and politician
- Erkki Karu (1887–1935), Finnish film director, screenwriter and producer
- Erkki Kataja (1924–1969), Finnish track and field athlete and Olympic medalist
- Erkki Keldo (born 1990), Estonian politician
- Erkki Kerttula (1909–1989), Finnish fencer and Olympic competitor
- Erkki Kilpinen (born 1948), Finnish Nordic combined skier and Olympic competitor
- Erkki Kohvakka (1937–2018), Finnish orienteering competitor
- Erkki Kokkonen (1938–2008), Finnish film director
- Erkki Koiso (1934-2000), Finnish ice hockey player
- Erkki Korhonen (born 1956), Finnish pianist, conductor and former director of the Finnish National Opera
- Erkki Koskinen (1925–2009), Finnish cyclist and Olympic competitor
- Erkki Kourula (born 1948), Finnish judge of the International Criminal Court
- Erkki Kurenniemi (1941–2017), Finnish electronic musician

== L–P ==
- Erkki Laine (1957-2009), Finnish ice hockey player and Olympic medalist
- Erkki Lehtonen (born 1957), Finnish ice hockey player and Olympic medalist
- Erkki Leikola (1900-1986), Finnish politician
- Erkki Liikanen (born 1950), Chairman of the Board of the Bank of Finland
- Erkki Lill (born 1968), Estonian curler and curling coach
- Erkki Mallenius (1928-2003), Finnish boxer and Olympic medalist
- Erkki Melartin (1875–1937), Finnish composer
- Erkki Miinala (born 1986), Finnish goalball player and Olympic medalist
- Erkki Nghimtina (1947–2026), Namibian politician
- Erkki Niemi (born 1962), Finnish high jumper and Olympic competitor
- Erkki Nordberg (1946–2012), Finnish military colonel and historian
- Erkki Oja (born 1948), Finnish computer scientist
- Erkki Pakkanen (1930-1973), Finnish boxer and Olympic medalist
- Erkki Peltonen (1861-1942), Finnish politician
- Erkki Penttilä (1932–2005), Finnish wrestler and Olympic medalist
- Erkki Pohjanheimo (born 1942), Finnish television producer and director
- Erkki Pukka (born 1940), Finnish ski-jumper
- Erkki Pulliainen (1938–2022), Finnish politician
- Erkki Pystynen (born 1929), Finnish politician

== R–Z ==
- Erkki Raappana (1893–1962), commander of the 14th Division of the Finnish Army
- Erkki Raatikainen (1930–2011), Finnish journalist and politician
- Erkki Räikkönen (1900–1961), Finnish nationalist leader
- Erkki Rajamäki (born 1978), Finnish ice hockey player
- Erkki Rapo (1946–2004), Finnish amateur autograph collector
- Erkki Ruoslahti (born 1940), Finnish physician and cancer researcher
- Erkki Ruuhinen (born 1943), Finnish graphic designer and artist
- Erkki Salmenhaara (1941–2002), Finnish composer and musicologist
- Erkki Salomaa (1917–1971), Finnish politician
- Erkki Savolainen (1917–1993), Finnish boxer and Olympic competitor
- Erkki Toivanen (1938–2011), Finnish journalist and news presenter
- Erkki Tuominen (1914–1975), Finnish politician
- Erkki Tuomioja (born 1946), Finnish politician
- Erkki-Sven Tüür (born 1959), Estonian composer
- Erkki Virtanen (born 1952), Finnish politician
