= Erko (given name) =

Male given name

- Gender: Male
- Language: Estonian
- Name day: 18 May

Origin
- Region of origin: Estonia

Other names
- Related names: Erik, Eeri, Eerik, Eero, Ergi, Ergo, Erich, Erik, Erki, Erkki

Erko is a predominantly Estonian masculine given name. It is a cognate of the given name Eric. Other Estonian variants include Erik, Eeri, Eerik, Eero, Ergi, Ergo, Erich, Erik, Erki, and Erkki.

As of 1 January 2023, 359 men in Estonian bear the first name Erko, making it the 345th most popular male name in the country.

People named Erko include:

- Erko Aabrams (born 1985), jet skier
- Erko Laurimaa (born 1987), rock guitarist (Smilers)
- Erko Saviauk (born 1977), footballer and manager
- Erko Jonne Tõugjas (born 2003), footballer
