= List of best-selling music artists in Finland =

These are the lists of the music artists that have the highest certified record sales in Finland (and/or sales explicitly confirmed by Musiikkituottajat – IFPI Finland in their database). The lists consist of albums and singles (vinyl, CD, digital) and music DVDs, certified or confirmed by Musiikkituottajat.

Musiikkituottajat deals in sales of digital and physical albums and singles and music DVDs. Excepting some sales figures of uncertified records given by Musiikkituottajat from the 2000s, these best-seller lists are largely based on total accumulated certifications given per artist and therefore may not reflect the true physical and digital sales obtained by these artists,—that is, the combined sales of uncertified records before the 2000s, those uncertified in and after the 2000s and certified sales of all time. Since the release of the October 3, 2007, Singles Chart, digital downloads of tracks have been included in the singles sales figures.

These lists exclude certifications of recordings by artists in collaboration with others as part of a single artist's total.

== All musical entities ==
| Number | Name | Nationality | Certified sales | Source |
|---|---|---|---|---|
| 1 | Eppu Normaali | FIN | 1,524,729 | |
| 2 | Matti ja Teppo | FIN | 1,069,019 | |
| 3 | Nightwish | FIN | 895,600 | |
| 4 | J. Karjalainen | FIN | 856,741 | |
| 5 | Kari Tapio | FIN | 837,306 | |
| 6 | Jari Sillanpää | FIN | 826,756 | |
| 7 | Smurffit | FIN | 807,307 | |
| 8 | Kirka | FIN | 754,380 | |
| 9 | Vesa-Matti Loiri | FIN | 753,926 | |
| 10 | Yö | FIN | 692,828 | |
| 11 | Madonna | USA | 656,120 | |
| 12 | ABBA | SWE | 652,605 | |
| 13 | Katri Helena | FIN | 631,465 | |
| 14 | Hurriganes | FIN | 597,918 | |
| 15 | Rölli-peikko | FIN | 552,137 | |
| 16 | Kaija Koo | FIN | 547,296 | |
| 17 | Hector | FIN | 533,365 | |
| 18 | Metallica | USA | 530,676 | |
| 19 | Samuli Edelmann | FIN | 521,280 | |
| 20 | Dingo | FIN | 505,580 | |
| 21 | Jamppa Tuominen | FIN | 503,034 | |
| 22 | Jope Ruonansuu | FIN | 480,023 | |
| 23 | Tapani Kansa | FIN | 479,396 | |
| 24 | Irwin Goodman | FIN | 474,401 | |
| 25 | HIM | FIN | 473,652 | |
| 26 | Dire Straits | UK | 471,803 | |
| 27 | Lauri Tähkä & Elonkerjuu | FIN | 470,340 | |
| 28 | Erkki Junkkarinen | FIN | 467,742 | |
| 29 | Popeda | FIN | 458,823 | |
| 30 | Leevi and the Leavings | FIN | 453,757 | |
| 31 | Anna Eriksson | FIN | 448,365 | |
| 32 | Bruce Springsteen | USA | 428,986 | |
| 33 | Fröbelin Palikat | FIN | 423,220 | |
| 34 | Bon Jovi | USA | 422,500 | |
| 35 | Nylon Beat | FIN | 409,666 | |
| 36 | Juice Leskinen | FIN | 405,536 | |
| 37 | Rainer Friman | FIN | 398,199 | |
| 38 | Reijo Taipale | FIN | 388,994 | |
| 39 | Michael Jackson | USA | 384,073 | |
| 40 | Tapio Rautavaara | FIN | 376,117 | |
| 41 | Mamba | FIN | 372,967 | |
| 42 | Queen | UK | 366,152 | |
| 43 | Joel Hallikainen | FIN | 365,218 | |
| 44 | Paula Koivuniemi | FIN | 359,925 | |
| 45 | Céline Dion | CAN | 356,183 | |
| 46 | Kolmas Nainen | FIN | 341,094 | |
| 47 | Yölintu | FIN | 338,579 | |
| 48 | Jenni Vartiainen | FIN | 332,365 | |
| 49 | Arja Koriseva | FIN | 331,085 | |
| 50 | Reijo Kallio | FIN | 330,896 | |
| 51 | Ultra Bra | FIN | 330,323 | |
| 52 | Anna Hanski | FIN | 319,705 | |
| 53 | Riitta Korpela | FIN | 319,352 | |
| 54 | Tiktak | FIN | 319,079 | |
| 55 | ZZ Top | USA | 315,815 | |
| 56 | PMMP | FIN | 312,713 | |
| 57 | The Rasmus | FIN | 309,346 | |
| 58 | Neljä ruusua | FIN | 307,673 | |
| 59 | Roxette | SWE | 307,349 | |
| 60 | Maija Vilkkumaa | FIN | 304,891 | |
| 61 | Slipknot | USA | 302,824 | |
| 62 | Aikakone | FIN | 300,587 | |
| 63 | Robin | FIN | 282,090 | |
| 64 | Ressu Redford | FIN | 281,697 | |
| 65 | Juha Tapio | FIN | 271,235 | |
| 66 | Kikka | FIN | 268,118 | |
| 67 | Guns N' Roses | USA | 267,560 | |
| 68 | Agents | FIN | 254,881 | |
| 69 | Marion Rung | FIN | 244,535 | |
| 70 | Tina Turner | USA | 241,954 | |
| 71 | Apulanta | FIN | 241,488 | |
| 72 | Sleepy Sleepers | FIN | 240,776 | |
| 73 | Children of Bodom | FIN | 239,833 | |
| 74 | Lea Laven | FIN | 239,309 | |
| 75 | Robbie Williams | UK | 235,743 | |
| 76 | U2 | IRE | 235,460 | |
| 77 | Anssi Kela | FIN | 234,936 | |
| 78 | Laura Voutilainen | FIN | 234,694 | |
| 79 | Chisu | FIN | 232,604 | |
| 80 | CMX | FIN | 230,051 | |
| 81 | Pet Shop Boys | UK | 228,298 | |
| 82 | Whitney Houston | USA | 228,007 | |
| 83 | Suvi Teräsniska | FIN | 227,191 | |
| 84 | Iron Maiden | UK | 225,051 | |
| 85 | Antti Tuisku | FIN | 224,900 | |
| 86 | Zen Café | FIN | 218,048 | |
| 87 | Scorpions | GER | 217,793 | |
| 88 | Kotiteollisuus | FIN | 214,233 | |
| 89 | Elvis Presley | USA | 213,945 | |
| 90 | Cheek | FIN | 212,567 | |
| 91 | Lordi | FIN | 212,533 | |
| 92 | Bomfunk MC's | FIN | 203,480 | |
| 93 | Janne Tulkki | FIN | 201,356 | |
| 94 | Tarja Ylitalo | FIN | 200,927 | |
| 95 | Bad Boys Blue | GER | 199,089 | |
| 96 | Anna Abreu | FIN | 198,500 | |
| 97 | Anne Mattila | FIN | 191,551 | |
| 98 | Rauli Badding Somerjoki | FIN | 191,361 | |
| 99 | Hassisen Kone | FIN | 187,503 | |
| 100 | Barbra Streisand | USA | 186,501 | |

== Soloists ==
| Number | Name | Nationality | Certified sales | Source |
|---|---|---|---|---|
| 1 | J. Karjalainen | FIN | 856,741 | |
| 2 | Kari Tapio | FIN | 837,306 | |
| 3 | Jari Sillanpää | FIN | 826,756 | |
| 4 | Kirka | FIN | 754,380 | |
| 5 | Vesa-Matti Loiri | FIN | 753,926 | |
| 6 | Madonna | USA | 656,120 | |
| 7 | Katri Helena | FIN | 631,465 | |
| 8 | Rölli-peikko | FIN | 552,137 | |
| 9 | Kaija Koo | FIN | 547,296 | |
| 10 | Hector | FIN | 533,365 | |
| 11 | Samuli Edelmann | FIN | 521,280 | |
| 12 | Jamppa Tuominen | FIN | 503,034 | |
| 13 | Jope Ruonansuu | FIN | 480,023 | |
| 14 | Tapani Kansa | FIN | 479,396 | |
| 15 | Irwin Goodman | FIN | 474,401 | |
| 16 | Erkki Junkkarinen | FIN | 467,742 | |
| 17 | Anna Eriksson | FIN | 448,365 | |
| 18 | Bruce Springsteen | USA | 428,986 | |
| 19 | Juice Leskinen | FIN | 405,536 | |
| 20 | Rainer Friman | FIN | 398,199 | |
| 21 | Reijo Taipale | FIN | 388,994 | |
| 22 | Michael Jackson | USA | 384,073 | |
| 23 | Tapio Rautavaara | FIN | 376,117 | |
| 24 | Joel Hallikainen | FIN | 365,218 | |
| 25 | Paula Koivuniemi | FIN | 359,925 | |
| 26 | Céline Dion | CAN | 356,183 | |
| 27 | Jenni Vartiainen | FIN | 332,365 | |
| 28 | Arja Koriseva | FIN | 331,085 | |
| 29 | Reijo Kallio | FIN | 330,896 | |
| 30 | Anna Hanski | FIN | 319,705 | |
| 31 | Riitta Korpela | FIN | 319,352 | |
| 32 | Maija Vilkkumaa | FIN | 304,891 | |
| 33 | Robin | FIN | 282,090 | |
| 34 | Ressu Redford | FIN | 281,697 | |
| 35 | Juha Tapio | FIN | 271,235 | |
| 36 | Kikka | FIN | 268,118 | |
| 37 | Marion Rung | FIN | 244,535 | |
| 38 | Tina Turner | USA | 241,954 | |
| 39 | Lea Laven | FIN | 239,309 | |
| 40 | Robbie Williams | UK | 235,743 | |
| 41 | Anssi Kela | FIN | 234,936 | |
| 42 | Laura Voutilainen | FIN | 234,694 | |
| 43 | Chisu | FIN | 232,604 | |
| 44 | Whitney Houston | USA | 228,007 | |
| 45 | Suvi Teräsniska | FIN | 227,191 | |
| 46 | Antti Tuisku | FIN | 224,900 | |
| 47 | Elvis Presley | USA | 213,945 | |
| 48 | Cheek | FIN | 212,567 | |
| 49 | Janne Tulkki | FIN | 201,356 | |
| 50 | Tarja Ylitalo | FIN | 200,927 | |

== Bands ==
| Number | Name | Nationality | Certified sales | Source |
|---|---|---|---|---|
| 1 | Eppu Normaali | FIN | 1,524,729 | |
| 2 | Matti ja Teppo | FIN | 1,069,019 | |
| 3 | Nightwish | FIN | 895,600 | |
| 4 | Smurffit | FIN | 807,307 | |
| 5 | Yö | FIN | 692,828 | |
| 6 | ABBA | SWE | 652,605 | |
| 7 | Hurriganes | FIN | 597,918 | |
| 8 | Metallica | USA | 530,676 | |
| 9 | Dingo | FIN | 505,580 | |
| 10 | HIM | FIN | 473,652 | |
| 11 | Dire Straits | UK | 471,803 | |
| 12 | Lauri Tähkä & Elonkerjuu | FIN | 470,340 | |
| 13 | Popeda | FIN | 458,823 | |
| 14 | Leevi and the Leavings | FIN | 453,757 | |
| 15 | Fröbelin Palikat | FIN | 423,220 | |
| 16 | Bon Jovi | USA | 422,500 | |
| 17 | Nylon Beat | FIN | 409,666 | |
| 18 | Mamba | FIN | 372,967 | |
| 19 | Queen | UK | 366,152 | |
| 20 | Kolmas Nainen | FIN | 341,094 | |
| 21 | Yölintu | FIN | 338,579 | |
| 22 | Ultra Bra | FIN | 330,323 | |
| 23 | Tiktak | FIN | 319,079 | |
| 24 | ZZ Top | USA | 315,815 | |
| 25 | PMMP | FIN | 312,713 | |
| 26 | The Rasmus | FIN | 309,346 | |
| 27 | Neljä ruusua | FIN | 307,673 | |
| 28 | Roxette | SWE | 307,349 | |
| 29 | AC/DC | AUS | 302,824 | |
| 30 | Aikakone | FIN | 300,587 | |
| 31 | Guns N' Roses | USA | 267,560 | |
| 32 | Agents | FIN | 254,881 | |
| 33 | Apulanta | FIN | 241,488 | |
| 34 | Sleepy Sleepers | FIN | 240,776 | |
| 35 | Children of Bodom | FIN | 239,833 | |
| 36 | U2 | IRE | 235,460 | |
| 37 | CMX | FIN | 230,051 | |
| 38 | Pet Shop Boys | UK | 228,298 | |
| 39 | Iron Maiden | UK | 225,051 | |
| 40 | Zen Café | FIN | 218,048 | |
| 41 | Scorpions | GER | 217,793 | |
| 42 | Kotiteollisuus | FIN | 214,233 | |
| 43 | Lordi | FIN | 212,533 | |
| 44 | Bomfunk MC's | FIN | 203,480 | |
| 45 | Bad Boys Blue | GER | 199,089 | |
| 46 | Hassisen Kone | FIN | 187,503 | |
| 47 | The Offspring | USA | 183,139 | |
| 48 | Rajaton | FIN | 179,969 | |
| 49 | Sonata Arctica | FIN | 175,387 | |
| 50 | Suurlähettiläät | FIN | 173,353 | |

== Male soloists ==
| Number | Name | Nationality | Certified sales | Source |
|---|---|---|---|---|
| 1 | J. Karjalainen | FIN | 856,741 | |
| 2 | Kari Tapio | FIN | 837,306 | |
| 3 | Jari Sillanpää | FIN | 826,756 | |
| 4 | Kirka | FIN | 754,380 | |
| 5 | Vesa-Matti Loiri | FIN | 753,926 | |
| 6 | Rölli-peikko | FIN | 552,137 | |
| 7 | Hector | FIN | 533,365 | |
| 8 | Samuli Edelmann | FIN | 521,280 | |
| 9 | Jamppa Tuominen | FIN | 503,034 | |
| 10 | Jope Ruonansuu | FIN | 480,023 | |
| 11 | Tapani Kansa | FIN | 479,396 | |
| 12 | Irwin Goodman | FIN | 474,401 | |
| 13 | Erkki Junkkarinen | FIN | 467,742 | |
| 14 | Bruce Springsteen | USA | 428,986 | |
| 15 | Juice Leskinen | FIN | 405,536 | |
| 16 | Rainer Friman | FIN | 398,199 | |
| 17 | Reijo Taipale | FIN | 388,994 | |
| 18 | Michael Jackson | USA | 384,073 | |
| 19 | Tapio Rautavaara | FIN | 376,117 | |
| 20 | Joel Hallikainen | FIN | 365,218 | |
| 21 | Reijo Kallio | FIN | 330,896 | |
| 22 | Robin | FIN | 282,090 | |
| 23 | Ressu Redford | FIN | 281,697 | |
| 24 | Juha Tapio | FIN | 271,235 | |
| 25 | Robbie Williams | UK | 235,743 | |
| 26 | Anssi Kela | FIN | 234,936 | |
| 27 | Antti Tuisku | FIN | 224,900 | |
| 28 | Elvis Presley | USA | 213,945 | |
| 29 | Cheek | FIN | 212,567 | |
| 30 | Janne Tulkki | FIN | 201,356 | |
| 31 | Rauli Badding Somerjoki | FIN | 191,361 | |
| 32 | Bryan Adams | CAN | 183,444 | |
| 33 | Phil Collins | UK | 182,581 | |
| 34 | Jaakko Teppo | FIN | 179,783 | |
| 35 | Fredi | FIN | 177,600 | |
| 36 | Viktor Klimenko | FIN | 170,690 | |
| 37 | Matti Esko | FIN | 170,149 | |
| 38 | Aki Sirkesalo | FIN | 166,455 | |
| 39 | Mikko Kuustonen | FIN | 166,028 | |
| 40 | Elton John | UK | 163,481 | |
| 41 | Kake Randelin | FIN | 161,000 | |
| 42 | Helmut Lotti | BEL | 158,123 | |
| 43 | Pikku G | FIN | 157,253 | |
| 44 | Ismo Alanko | FIN | 152,234 | |
| 45 | Sting | UK | 147,321 | |
| 46 | Tommi Läntinen | FIN | 144,707 | |
| 47 | Georg Malmstén | FIN | 142,000 | |
| 48 | Ricky Martin | USA | 140,812 | |
| 49 | Topi Sorsakoski | FIN | 140,304 | |
| 50 | Chris Rea | UK | 137,132 | |

== Female soloists ==
| Number | Name | Nationality | Certified sales | Source |
|---|---|---|---|---|
| 1 | Madonna | USA | 656,120 | |
| 2 | Katri Helena | FIN | 631,465 | |
| 3 | Kaija Koo | FIN | 547,296 | |
| 4 | Anna Eriksson | FIN | 448,365 | |
| 5 | Paula Koivuniemi | FIN | 359,925 | |
| 6 | Céline Dion | CAN | 356,183 | |
| 7 | Jenni Vartiainen | FIN | 332,365 | |
| 8 | Arja Koriseva | FIN | 331,085 | |
| 9 | Anna Hanski | FIN | 319,705 | |
| 10 | Riitta Korpela | FIN | 319,352 | |
| 11 | Maija Vilkkumaa | FIN | 304,891 | |
| 12 | Kikka | FIN | 268,118 | |
| 13 | Marion Rung | FIN | 244,535 | |
| 14 | Tina Turner | USA | 241,954 | |
| 15 | Lea Laven | FIN | 239,309 | |
| 16 | Laura Voutilainen | FIN | 234,694 | |
| 17 | Chisu | FIN | 232,604 | |
| 18 | Whitney Houston | USA | 228,007 | |
| 19 | Suvi Teräsniska | FIN | 227,191 | |
| 20 | Tarja Ylitalo | FIN | 200,927 | |
| 21 | Anna Abreu | FIN | 198,500 | |
| 22 | Anne Mattila | FIN | 191,551 | |
| 23 | Barbra Streisand | USA | 186,501 | |
| 24 | Irina | FIN | 155,082 | |
| 25 | Anna Puu | FIN | 151,915 | |
| 26 | Karita Mattila | FIN | 150,220 | |
| 27 | Britney Spears | USA | 143,627 | |
| 28 | Eva Dahlgren | SWE | 129,623 | |
| 29 | Shakira | COL | 124,102 | |
| 30 | Pandora | SWE | 115,546 | |
| 31 | Anastacia | USA | 115,400 | |
| 32 | Alexia | ITA | 113,164 | |
| 31 | Lady Gaga | USA | 111,859 | |
| 34 | Meiju Suvas | FIN | 108,000 | |
| 35 | Adele | UK | 104,157 | |
| 36 | Heidi Kyrö | FIN | 101,196 | |
| 37 | Brita Koivunen | FIN | 100,000 | |
| 38 | Erin | FIN | 99,442 | |
| 39 | Hanna Ekola | FIN | 94,268 | |
| 40 | Hanna Pakarinen | FIN | 91,217 | |
| 41 | Pink | USA | 89,319 | |
| 42 | Alanis Morissette | CAN^{[A]} | 86,706 | |
| 43 | Tarja Turunen | FIN | 86,578 | |
| 44 | Kim Wilde | UK | 82,006 | |
| 45 | Eija Merilä | FIN | 77,716 | |
| 46 | Tuula Amberla | FIN | 77,173 | |
| 47 | Vicky Rosti | FIN | 75,189 | |
| 48 | Anita Hirvonen | FIN | 75,000 | |
| 49 | Bonnie Tyler | UK | 74,523 | |
| 50 | Johanna Kurkela | FIN | 72,686 | |

Notes

- A When the certified records were released, Morissette had only the Canadian citizenship.

== See also ==
- List of best-selling music artists
- List of best-selling albums in Finland
- List of best-selling singles in Finland
