= Pahvische =

Studio album by Eläkeläiset
- Released: 2002
- Genre: Humppa

Eläkeläiset chronology
| Joulutorttu (2002) | Pahvische (2002) | Katkolla Humppa (2003) |

Pahvische is a 2002 album by the Finnish group Eläkeläiset.

== Track listing ==
1. "Kiitokset humpasta" (Kristian Voutilainen) – 3:24
2. "Hanurissa Arja" (Onni Varis) – 2:56 Halonen Ja Kinnunen Ja Santaharju
3. "Kuuma humppa" (Lassi Kinnunen) – 3:19
4. "Humppanautinto" (Martti Varis) – 3:25
5. "Jenkkapolkkahumppa" (Voutilainen) – Santaharju 3:21
6. "Päivätanssit" (Kinnunen) – 2:54
7. "Humpataan, jumalauta" (O. Varis) – 2:02
8. "Miksei täällä humppa soi?" (Voutilainen) – 3:52
9. "Ranttalihumppa" (M. Varis) – 3:50
10. "Sukellan humppaan" (O. Varis) – 3:22
11. "Bingohon" (Kinnunen) – 3:24
12. "Kiikkustuolissa" (Voutilainen) – 2:22
13. "Humpalle vaan" (M. Varis) – 3:15
14. "Humppastara" (Kinnunen) – 3:25
15. "Humppauskonto" (Voutilainen) – 3:33

The CD also contains a 25-minute extra track, not listed on the cover, consisting of radio noise mixed with speech and fragments of songs. Some sources list this final track with the name "Humppaviritys".
