= Werbung, Baby! =

Werbung, baby!

Compilation album by Eläkeläiset
- Released: 1998 Martti Waris Bass Ja Laulu Onni Waris Urut Ja Laulu Petteri Halonen Urut ja Kitara Ja Laulu Lassi Kunnunen Haitari Ja Laulu Tapio Santaharju Rummut Ja Laulu Petteri Terävä Kitara Ja Laulu Tapio Savela Kitara Ja Laulu Kristian VOUTILAINEN (vocals, drums
- Genre: Humppa
- Label: Stupido Records

Eläkeläiset chronology
Humppamaratooni	Werbung, baby!	Humppa-Akatemia

Werbung, baby! is a 1998 album by the Finnish group Eläkeläiset. It consists of humppa cover versions or remixes of popular songs.

== Track listing ==
Original artist and song in parentheses.

1. Hump (Van Halen - Jump) - 2.27
2. Humppakonehumppa (Meredith Brooks - Bitch) - 3.15
3. Humppamedia (Kent - Om du var här) - 3.09
4. Punakka humppa (Aerosmith - Pink) - 2.34
5. Peljätty humppa (Carl Douglas - Kung-Fu Fighting) - 2.23
6. Humpan alla (Red Hot Chili Peppers - Under The Bridge) - 2.58
7. Humppaa, saatanat! (Spencer Davis Group - Gimme Some Lovin') - 2.17
8. Kuusessa hevon (Eric Clapton - Tears In Heaven) - 2.37
9. Lierohumppa (Elvis Presley - Suspicious Minds) - 2.29
10. Paratiisihumppa (Stevie Wonder - Pastime Paradise) - 3.07
11. Humppatarzan (Foo Fighters - Monkeywrench) - 2.04
12. Poltettu humppa (Midnight Oil - Beds Are Burning) - 3.23
13. Humppauhraus (Kiss - I Love It Loud) - 3.03
14. Humppakummitus (Chumbawamba - Homophobia) - 2.35
15. Humppabarbi (Aqua - Barbie Girl) - 2.10
16. Tervetuloa mehtään (Guns N' Roses - Welcome to the Jungle) - 2.08
17. Hotelli Helpotus (The Eagles - Hotel California) - 4.04
18. Humppaan itsekseni (Billy Idol - Dancing With Myself) - 4.03

19 Humppamestaruus 20 Humppamestari 21 Humppakunnitustalo 22 Humppa Haisee 23 Humppa Paska 24 Humppa Muutti
