= Humppasirkus =

Studio album by Eläkeläiset
- Released: 2006
- Genre: Humppa

Eläkeläiset chronology
Humppaelämää (2003)	Humppasirkus (2006)	Das Humppawerk (2006)

Humppasirkus is a 2006 album by the Finnish group Eläkeläiset.

== Track listing ==
1. Humppaa Suomesta - 3.53 (The Sounds - Living in America / "Humppa from Finland")
2. Vihaan humppaa - 2.55 (Children of Bodom - Hate Me! / "I Hate Humppa")
3. Jukolan humppa - 3.32 (Nightwish - Nemo / "The Jukola Humppa")
4. Humppaidiootti - 3.24 (The Hives - Walk Idiot Walk / "Humppa Idiot")
5. Viinaa hanuristille - 3.32 (Buzzcocks - Harmony in My Head / "Booze for the Accordionist")
6. Humppaneitsyt - 3.09 (Madonna - Like a Virgin / "Humppa Virgin")
7. Kulumaton humppa - 3.36 (Kylie Minogue - Can't Get You Out of My Head / "The Enduring Humppa")
8. Humppa telkkariin - 2.50 (Kemopetrol - Saw It on TV / "Get Humppa On TV")
9. Nautiskelen humpasta - 3.02 (Hellacopters - By The Grace of God / "I Savor The Humppa")
10. Hävisin lotossa taas - 3.02 (Cardigans - My favourite game / "I Lost The Lottery Again")
11. Humpataan - 2.20 (Andrew WK - Party Hard / "Let's Humppa")
12. Humppa raikaa - 2.17 (Cameo - Word up! / "The Humppa Resounds")
13. Jatkosotajenkka - 2.11 (Hank Williams - Move It On Over / "Continuation War Jenkka")
14. Orpo humppari - 2.57 (Neil Diamond - Solitary man / "The Orphan Humpper")
