= Erkkilä =

Erkkilä is a Finnish language surname, derived from the given name Erkki, a form of Eric. Notable people with the surname include:

- Eeli Erkkilä (1909–1963), Finnish politician
- Eero Erkkilä (born 1941), Finnish conductor
- Mika Erkkilä (born 1990), Finnish ice hockey player
