= Räpo =

Rapo or Räpo may refer to

== Place ==
- Räpo, Võru Parish, Estonia

== Surname ==
- Donald Rapo (born 1990), Albanian footballer
- Erkki Rapo (1946–2004), Finnish amateur autograph collector
- Eric Rapo (born 1972), Swiss footballer

== See also ==
- Dušan Rapoš (born in 1953), Slovak film director
