= Aadli =

Aadli is an Estonian surname meaning titled and nobiliary. Notable people with the surname include:

- Argo Aadli (born 1980), Estonian actor
- Erkki Aadli (born 1974), Estonian orienteer
