= Eerikki =

Finnish male given name

- Gender: Male
- Language: Finnish

Origin
- Region of origin: Finland

Other names
- Related names: Erik, Eerik, Erki, Erkki, Eero

Eerikki is a Finnish masculine given name. It is a cognate of the name Eric.

Individuals bearing the name Eerikki include;

- Eerikki Koivu (born 1979), ice hockey player
- Eerikki Tuurenpoika (fl. 15th-century; also known as Eric Bielke and Eric Turesson), royal councillor of Sweden, knight and feudal fiefholder
- Eerikki Viljanen (born 1975), politician
