= Humppa United =

Studio album by Eläkeläiset
- Released: 2008
- Genre: Humppa
- Label: Stupido Records

Eläkeläiset chronology
Humppakonsertto	Humppa United

Humppa United is a 2008 album by the Finnish group Eläkeläiset. It consists of humppa cover versions of (relatively) popular songs.

== Track listing ==
1. "Humppa tanaan" – 3:22 (Dead Kennedys - "Kill the Poor")
2. "Humppakasanova" – 3:48 (Disco Ensemble - "Drop Dead Casanova")
3. "Kukkuu-ukot" – 3:27 (Turbonegro - "Boys from Nowhere")
4. "Humppamuoti" – 2:52 (Hanoi Rocks - "Fashion")
5. "Äkäinen eläkeläinen" – 4:08 (Tom Robinson - "Glad to Be Gay")
6. "Humppamissi" – 2:00 (The Damned - "Hit or Miss")
7. "Puliukko" – 2:12 (Sam The Sham and the Pharaohs - "Wooly Bully")
8. "Mummo" – 3:18 (The Temptations - "My Girl")
9. "Humppakeksi" – 3:35 (Masters of Reality - "Domino")
10. "Vaivaistalossa" – 3:35 (Amorphis - "House of Sleep")
11. "Humppaholisti" – 2:05 (Pixies - "The Holiday Song")
12. "Humppapuoskari" – 2:55 (Apocalyptica - "I'm Not Jesus")
13. "Humppatähti" – 3:01 (Karl Bartos - "15 Minutes of Fame")
14. "Humppaviikot" – 3:19 (Hard-Fi - "Living for the Weekend")
15. "Tajuton humppa" – 3:52 (XTC - "Making Plans for Nigel")
16. "Humppatauti" – 3:00 (The Nits - "In the Dutch Mountains")

Total time 52:00
