= Humppakalmisto =

2013 album by Eläkeläiset

Studio album by Eläkeläiset
- Released: 2013
- Genre: Humppa
- Label: Akun Tehdastuotanto; Nordic Notes
- Producer: Ensio Hienonen

Eläkeläiset chronology
Humppasheikkailu (2012)	Humppakalmisto (2013)

Humppakalmisto (Humppa Cemetery) is a 2013 album by the Finnish band Eläkeläiset. It consists of humppa covers of folk and traditional songs.

No.	Title	Original	Original artist	Time
1.	Humppaa veressä (Humppa in my blood)	Swing Low Sweet Chariot	traditional	2:12
2.	Aimolle heila (Girlfriend for Aimo)	Guantanamera	traditional	2:24
3.	Humppavammanen (Humppa retard)	The Wanderer	Dion DiMucci	1:21
4.	Pultsariano Humpparotti (Drunkard Humppa)	'O sole mio	Eduardo Di Capua	2:02
5.	Vanhan ukon humppa (Humppa of an old Man)	Roll and Tumble Blues	traditional	2:35
6.	Humppalähetystö (Humppa Missionary)	When Johnny Comes Marching Home	traditional	1:27
7.	Humppakerjäläinen (Humppa Beggar)	Wayfaring Stranger	traditional	3:10
8.	Humppaan pellolla (I dance Humppa in the field)	Cotton Fields	Lead Belly	2:10
9.	Mahtavat ilkamat (Great Ilkamat)	Waltzing Matilda	traditional	2:34
10.	Humppaa ja jenkkaa (Humppa and Jenkka)	Young Man Blues	Mose Allison	1:40
11.	Humppapullon henki (Humppa Genie)	Totuuden henki	traditional	1:02
12.	Rattoisa humppa (Merry Humppa)	El cóndor pasa	traditional	3:28
13.	Mummo elä mee (Grandma, don't go)	Black Betty	Lead Belly	1:40
14.	Hanuria hellästi (Affectionate accordion)	Aura Lee	George R. Poulton	2:07
15.	Sieluni huutaa humppaa (My soul is screaming for humppa)	Loch Lomond	traditional	1:25
16.	Humppakunto (Humppa condition)	Baby, Please Don't Go	Big Joe Williams	1:25
17.	Humppariivaaja (Humppa devil)	La Bamba	traditional	2:59

The album also has a bonus track called "Humppatuuri" (Humppa luck).
