= Eero (name) =

Estonian and Finnish male given name

- Gender: Male
- Languages: Estonian, Finnish
- Name day: 18 May

Origin
- Region of origin: Estonia, Finland

Other names
- Related names: Erik, Eerik, Eerikki, Erich, Erki, Erkki, Eric

Eero is an Estonian and Finnish masculine given name (pronounced: /e:ro/). Notable people with the name include:

- Eero Aarnio (born 1932), Finnish interior designer
- Eero Aho (born 1968), Finnish actor
- Eero Akaan-Penttilä (born 1943), Finnish politician
- Eero Antikainen (1906–1960), Finnish trade union leader and politician
- Eero Berg (1898–1969), Finnish athlete
- Eero Böök (1910–1990), Finnish chess player and engineer
- Eero Elo (born 1990), Finnish ice hockey player
- Eero Endjärv (born 1973), Estonian architect
- Eero Epner (born 1978), Estonian art historian and playwright
- Eero Erkko (1860–1927), Finnish journalist and politician
- Eero Haapala (born 1989), Finnish long jumper
- Eero Haapalainen (c. 1880 – 1937), Finnish Communist leader
- Eero Hämeenniemi (born 1951), Finnish composer, musician and writer
- Eero Heinonen (born 1979), Finnish musician and bass player in The Rasmus
- Eero Heinäluoma (born 1955), Finnish politician and former Speaker of the Parliament
- Eero Hirvonen (born 1996), Finnish Nordic combined skier
- Eero Huovinen (born 1944), former Bishop of Helsinki
- Eero Hynninen (born 1953), Finnish sprint canoer and Olympic competitor
- Eero Hyvärinen (1890–1973), Finnish gymnast and Olympic competitor
- Eero Järnefelt (1863–1937), Finnish realist painter
- Eero Kilpeläinen (born 1985), Finnish ice hockey goaltender
- Eero Kilpi (1882–1954), Finnish actor
- Eero Koivistoinen (born 1946), Finnish jazz musician and saxophone player
- Eero Kolehmainen (1918–2013), Finnish cross country skier
- Eero Korte (born 1987), Finnish football midfielder
- Eero Lehmann (born 1974), German fencer and Olympic competitor
- Eero Lehti (born 1944), Finnish politician and businessman
- Eero Lehtonen (1898–1959), Finnish pentathlete
- Eero Liives (1892–1978), Estonian composer and violinist
- Eero Lohi (1927–2023), Finnish modern pentathlete and Olympic competitor
- Eero Loone (born 1935), Estonian philosopher
- Eero Mäkelä (1942–2008), Finnish chef
- Eero Mäntyranta (1937–2013), Finnish skier and Olympic medalist
- Eero Markkanen (born 1991), Finnish football player
- Eero Merilind (born 1971), Estonian physician and politician
- Eero Milonoff (born 1980), Finnish actor
- Eero Naapuri (1918–1987), Finnish colonel and skier and Olympic competitor
- Eero Neemre (1905–1994), Estonian actor and theatre director
- Eero Nelimarkka (1891–1977), Finnish painter
- Eero Palm (born 1974), Estonian architect
- Eero Paloheimo (born 1936), Finnish designer, politician and university professor
- Eero Peltonen (born 1986), Finnish football striker
- Eero Rantala (1941–2019), Finnish politician
- Eero Raittinen (1944–2025), Finnish rock musician
- Eero Rebo (born 1974), Estonian military colonel
- Eero Ritala (born 1983), Finnish actor
- Eero Roine (1904–1966), Finnish actor
- Eero Saari (1928–2023), Finnish professional ice hockey player
- Eero Saarinen (1910–1961), Finnish-American architect
- Eero Salisma (1916–1998), Finnish professional ice hockey player
- Eero Salo (1921-1975), Finnish politician
- Eero Savilahti (born 1992), Finnish ice hockey player
- Eero Simoncelli, American computational neuroscientist
- Eero Somervuori (born 1979), Finnish ice hockey forward
- Eero Spriit (born 1949), Estonian actor and producer
- Eero Tapio (1941–2022), Finnish wrestler and Olympic competitor
- Eero Tarasti (born 1948), Finnish musicologist and semiotician
- Eero Tuomaala (1926–1988), Finnish long-distance runner and Olympic competitor
- Eero Väre (born 1984), Finnish ice hockey goaltender

As a surname

- Endel Eero (1930–2006), Estonian politician
