= Lea Laven =

Finnish pop singer (born 1948)

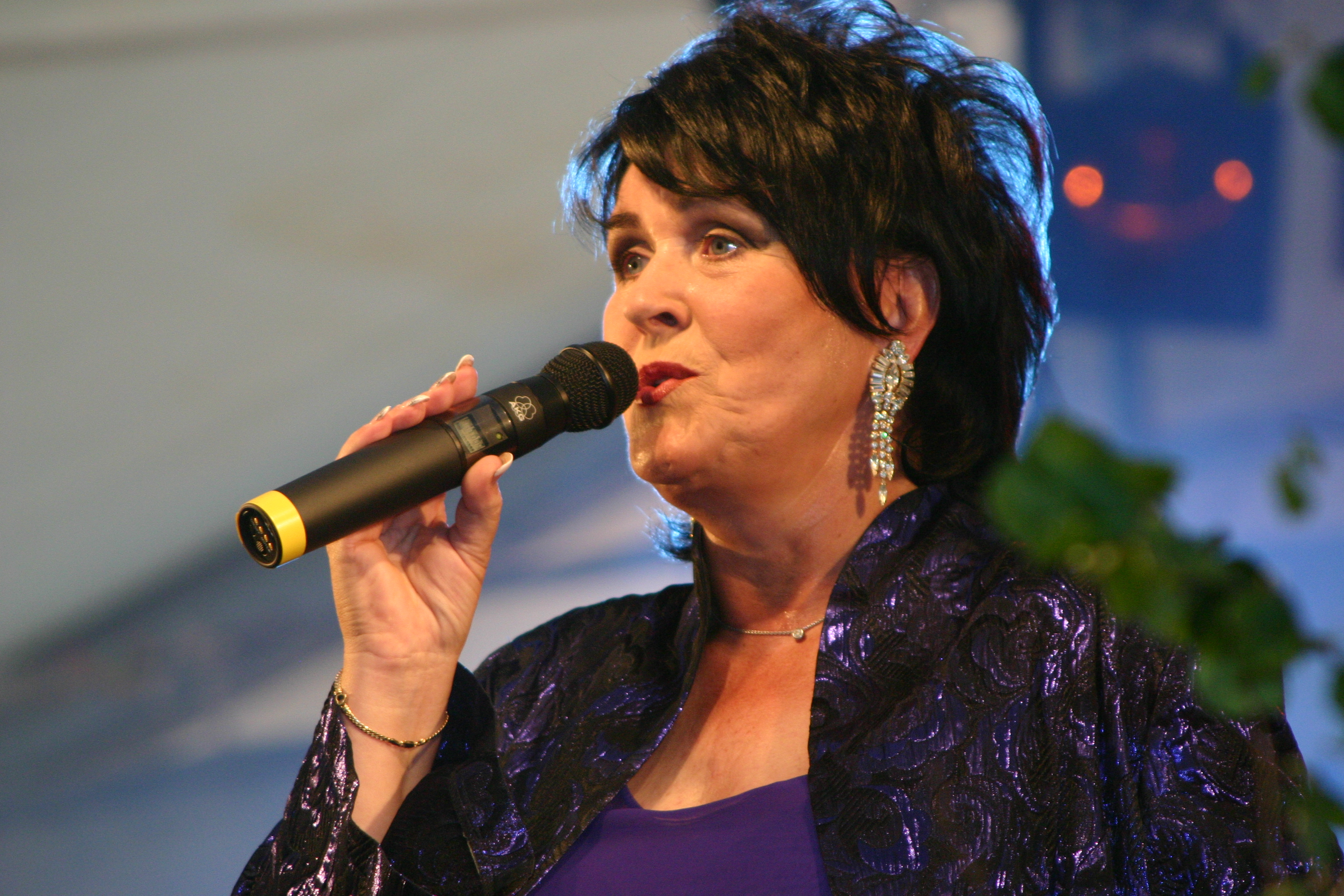
Lea Laven in Vihreät Niityt music festival.

Lea Laven (née Luukinen; after that Marjanen, Forssell and Tulonen; born 19 June 1948) is a Finnish pop singer.

Laven was born in the small town of Haukipudas, where she grew up in meager circumstances: she began singing in shows while in school and as a teenager began participating in talent competitions. After completing her schooling she lived for a time in Sweden where she worked as a domestic in hotels and nursing homes. In 1966 while back in Finland for an intended visit Laven attended a dance where Pentti Oskari Kangas was playing: Laven asked to sing with his band and the reaction resulted in her being recruited as a vocalist. When not performing with the band Laven worked at a textile mill in the town of Rauma which was Kangas' home base.

In 1969 Laven began recording for EMI Columbia - later known as CBS Records - with a debut album Se Jokin issued in 1970: during this time Laven also had a "day job" as a secretary at the label's Helsinki office. For several years Laven typically recorded Finnish language cover versions of contemporary international hits with the 1974 double A-side single "Niin"/ "Tumma Nainen" - comprising Finnish renderings of "Sì" and "Dark Lady" originally by respectively Gigliola Cinquetti and Cher - affording Laven her career record with a #5 peak on the Finnish national charts: "Niin"/ "Tumma Nainen" debuted in the Top 30 in August 1974 and was still ranked in the Top 30 in August 1975.

Lea Laven in 1987

In 1978 Laven took second place - in a tie - in the Finnish national preliminary round of the Eurovision contest with the song "Aamulla Rakkaani Näin" which served at the title cut of Laven's seventh album which became Laven's first gold-certified album. Laven's subsequent recorded output was more focused on new material including the 1979 Syksyn sävel winner "Ei oo, ei tuu" which was the #1 hit in Finland for the months of December 1979 and January 1980. Laven still recorded Finnish-language covers including "Lahjan Sain" which as "Si la vie est cadeau" had won Eurovision 1983. In 1984 Laven switched to Bluebird Records where her debut album Sanat murenevat - Laven's twelfth album release - became her sole platinum-certified album to date. In 1990 Laven debuted on the Polarvox label with the album Ali Baba which was Laven's seventeenth album release and her sixth album to be certified gold. Laven subsequently experienced a drop in her career profile but was afforded a major comeback in 1999 when she again won the Syksyn sävel and her winning song ""Nyt kun oot mennyt" reached #6 on the Finnish national charts. Laven's twenty-fourth album Tähdenlennon alla was issued in 2006. Laven has resided in Naantali since 1984.

== See also ==
- List of best-selling music artists in Finland
