= Jopet-show =

Finnish sketch show

Jopet-show is a Finnish sketch show starring comedian Jope Ruonansuu, Mika Räinä and Jukka Toivonen. It aired on Yle's channel from 2005 to 2011.

== Sketches ==
=== Season 1 ===
- Puhuva pää ("A Talking Head")
- Aulis Gerlander
- Keksijä ("An Inventor")
- Ylilääkäri Irvi Tapani Kaikkonen ("Doctorate Irvi Tapani Kaikkonen")
- Armeijan eversti ("A Colonel in the Army")
- Sivupersoonamies Risto ("Risto the Man with Other Self")
- Ennustaja Tollo Peloton ("The Future Teller Tollo Peloton")
- Kitaransoittaja/säveltäjä ("A Guitar Player/Composer")
- Pizza-Peku (a Turkish man who owns a pizzeria)
- Dilledong! (a parody of a Finnish interactive TV-show Ring-A-Ling)
- Lehteä lukeva ruma tyttö ("An Ugly Little Girl Reading a Magazine")
- Lentokapteeni Saikkonen ("Captain Saikkonen")
- Pepe Puputti, kirjailija Kiuruvedeltä ("Pepe Puputti, an Author from Kiuruvesi")
- Virolainen radioasema ("An Estonian Radio Station")
- Kansantaloustieteen erikoistutkija Tenho Lepakko ohjelmassa Tietovuoto ("The Economics Special Researcher Tenho Lepakko in the Show Tietovuoto")
- Miehet hississä ("Men in a Lift")

=== Season 2 ===
- Homopoliisit ("Homosexual Police Officers")
- Chatjuontajat ("The Chat Speakers")
- Uutistenlukija ("The Newscaster", he always says Tä? (in English Huh?))
- Remu Aaltonen
- Psykiatri ("Psychiatrist")
- Maksastapuhuja ("The Liver-Ventriloquist")
- Käytettyjen autojen myyjä ("Used Cars Seller")
- Mainostentekijät ("The Advertisers")
- Vissymies ("The Man Drinking Vichy Water")
- Teinit ("Teenagers")

=== Season 3 ===
- Yeltsin (Yeltsin is a little insane Russian living at a gravel quarry next to a nuclear power plant who talks a lot but whose speech can no-one understand. Slides some Finnish words in the middle of his speech.)
