= Erki (given name) =

Estonian male given name

- Gender: Male
- Language: Estonian
- Name day: 18 May

Origin
- Region of origin: Estonia

Other names
- Related names: Erik, Eerik, Eerikki, Erich, Erkki, Eero

Erki is a common Estonian-language male given name. Its name day in Estonia is 18 May. Related versions to Erki are Erkki, Eerikki (more common in Finland), Eerik, Erik, Erich, Eeri, Eero, Ergo, Ergi, and Erko (all share the 18 May name day).

People with the name Erki include:

- Erki Kivinukk (born 1973), Estonian basketball player
- Erki Nool (born 1970), Estonian decathlete and politician
- Erki Pehk (born 1968), Estonian conductor
- Erki Pütsep (born 1976), Estonian professional road bicycle racer
