= Fröbelin Palikat =

Finnish children's music band

- Origin: Finland
- Genres: Children's music, Rock 'n' roll, Rockabilly, Blues rock
- Years active: 1987–present
- Members: Mats Lillrank; Ari Bergström; Hannu Mäkelä; Timo Nuutinen
- Website: www.frobelinpalikat.fi

Fröbelin Palikat is a Finnish children's music band. The band was formed in 1987 by kindergarten teachers Mats Lillrank, Ari Bergström, and Hannu Mäkelä, who had met while studying at Helsingin lastentarhanopettajaopisto in 1981–1983. Timo Nuutinen joined the band later in 1987. The name Fröbelin Palikat ("Fröbel's blocks") derives from the educational toy blocks designed by German pedagogue Friedrich Fröbel.

With over 423,220 records sold, Fröbelin Palikat is one of the best-selling music artists in Finland.

== Band members ==
- Mats Lillrank – lead vocals, guitar
- Ari Bergström – keyboards, backing vocals
- Hannu Mäkelä – drums
- Timo Nuutinen – bass guitar, guitar, backing vocals

== Discography ==
=== Albums ===
- Fröbelin Palikat (1991)
- Sutsisatsi (1993)
- Sätkyukot (1994)
- Hippulat vinkumaan (1996)
- Zupadibum (1998)
- Saa tonttuilla! (2000)
- Pii-paa (2004)
- Hui hai (2009)
- Joulu joutuu (2016)
- Jee-jee 30-vee (2017)
- Lits läts (2020)

=== Compilations albums ===
- Parhaat palat (2002)

=== DVD/VHS ===
- Parhaat leikkilaulut 1 (VHS, 1995; DVD, 2007)
- Parhaat leikkilaulut 2 (VHS, 1996; DVD, 2007)
- Lisää leikkilauluja (VHS, 1999; DVD, 2007)
- Parhaat videot (VHS, 2003)
- Fröbelin Palikat (DVD, 2004)
- Uudet kujeet (DVD, 2007)
- Jaksaa heilua (DVD, 2012)
- Fröbelin Palikat: Live Tavastialla (DVD, 2014)
- Juhlakokoelma (DVD, 2018)
- Tonttuillaan (DVD, 2020)

=== Other ===
- Bob the Builder's Finnish theme song
