= Humppa-Akatemia =

Compilation album by Eläkeläiset

Compilation album by Eläkeläiset
- Released: 2000
- Genre: Humppa

Eläkeläiset chronology
Humpan Kuninkaan Hovissa (2000)	Humppa-Akatemia (2000)	Humppa Till We Die (2000)

Humppa-Akatemia is a 2000 compilation album by the Finnish group Eläkeläiset.

== Track listing ==
=== Disc 1 ===
1. Hyljätyn humppa (Hanoi Rocks – Don't You Ever Leave Me)
2. Humppasonni (HIM – Join Me)
3. Humppaosasto (Jalla Jalla – Hospital Waltz)
4. Ja humppa soi (Rauli Badding Somerjoki – Ja rokki soi)
5. Humppapappa vaan (Ebba Grön – Mamma, Pappa, Barn)
6. Humppa sujuu (Weeping Willows – True To You)
7. Hump (Van Halen – Jump)
8. Kuusessa hevon (Eric Clapton – Tears In Heaven)
9. Humppamedia (Kent – Om du var här)
10. Hotelli helpotus (The Eagles – Hotel California)
11. Paratiisihumppa (Stevie Wonder – Pastime Paradise)
12. Humppaa, saatanat (Spencer Davis Group – Gimme Some Lovin')
13. Poltettu humppa (Midnight Oil – Beds Are Burning)
14. Humppakonehumppa (Meredith Brooks – Bitch)
15. Humpparaakki (Dio – Holy Diver)
16. Humppalialaiset (Peter Gabriel – Games Without Frontiers)
17. Pultsarihumppa (Weezer – Buddy Holly)
18. Humppakostajat (Suede – The Beautiful Ones)
19. Humppaleski 45 (Police – Every Breath You Take)
20. Miinakenttähumppa (X-Perience – Magic Fields)
21. Humppasusi Ruotsissa (Frank Zappa – Bobby Brown)
22. Humpaten ympäri maailman (John Fogerty – Rocking All Over The World)
23. Humppamaratooni (Whiskey In The Jar)

=== Disc 2 ===
1. Humppapommi (Rancid – Time Bomb)
2. Humppa (Cranberries – Zombie)
3. Dumpkopf (Troggs – Wild Thing)
4. Humppaa tai kuole (2 Unlimited – No Limits)
5. Savua Laatokalla (Deep Purple – Smoke On The Water)
6. Laakista humppa (Damned – Love Song)
7. Eläkeläiset (Spin Doctors – Two Princes)
8. Elän humpalla (Bon Jovi – Living On A Prayer)
9. Humppaan itsekseni (Billy Idol – Dancing With Myself)
10. Sortohumppa (J.M.K.E. – Tere Perestroika)
11. Sorvarin humppa (Motörhead – Ace Of Spades)
12. Pyjamahumppa (Roxette – Sleeping In My Car)
13. Ryhtivaliohumppa (ZZ Top – Sharp Dressed Man)
14. Kuka humpan seisauttaa? (Creedence Clearwater Revival – Who'll Stop The Rain)
15. Aamupalahumppa (Suzanne Vega – Tom's Diner)
16. Humppaleka (Elvis Presley – Viva Las Vegas)
17. Pöpi (22-Pistepirkko – Birdy)
18. Heil humppa (Kim Wilde – Kids In America)
19. Kahvipakettihumppa (Neil Young – Rocking In The Free World)
20. Dementikon keppihumppa (Kiss – I Was Made For Loving You)
21. Humppalaki (Judas Priest – Breaking The Law)
22. Kiping kapin, mä riennän alkoon (Led Zeppelin – Living Loving Maid)
23. Humppaukaasi (Queen – We Will Rock You)
24. Jääkärihumppa (Europe – Final Countdown)
25. Poro (Kraftwerk – Robots)
26. Astuva humppa (Nancy Sinatra – These Boots Are Made For Walking)
27. Lumpiohumppa (The Who – My Generation)

Also two 'hidden' tracks: Poterohumppa (Cyndi Lauper – She Bop) and En saa millään humpatuksi (Rolling Stones – "(I Can't Get No) Satisfaction")
