= Tapani Kansa =

Finnish singer (1949–2025)

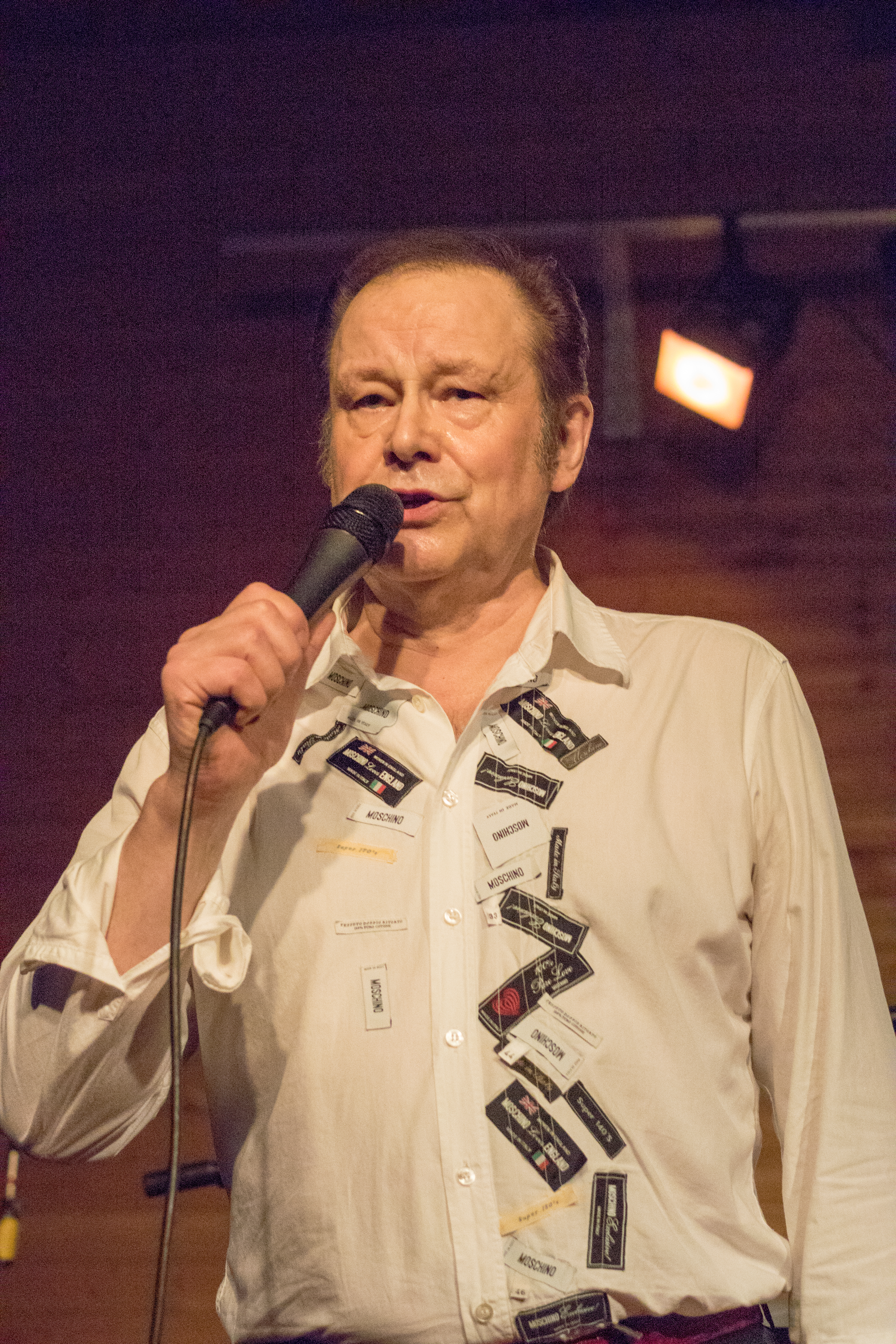
Tapani Kansa in 2014

Aarne Tapani Kansa (9 March 1949 – 25 March 2025) was a Finnish singer.

== Life and career ==
Born in Hamina, Tapani Kansa made his first record deal in 1967 and had a breakthrough the next year, with his version of the hit song "Delilah", translated into Finnish. Kansa had established a career in singing at a very young age. He had started studying singing in the Kotka music academy in the middle 1960s. His colourful performance style brought him much work on television. His early hit songs include "Kuljen taas kotiinpäin" ("I am walking home again"), "Eloise" and "Käymme yhdessä ain" ("We will always go together"). In 1976, Kansa achieved great success with his songs "R-A-K-A-S" ("D-E-A-R"), "Hafanana" and "Melina". The next year he released the album Mistä rakkaus alkoi ("Where did the love start"), which presented a more pop music style Kansa: The album contains a Finnish version of Elton John's song "Sorry Seems to Be the Hardest Word - in Finnish "Anteeksi on vaikea pyytää" ("It is hard to apologise").

The 1970s brought rock and roll and show music to Kansa's concerts. Hits of the time included "Rokkivaari Hotanen" ("Hotanen, the rocking grandpa", translated from "Daddy Cool" by Darts) and "Kalajoen hiekat" ("The sands of Kalajoki", translated from "California Dreamin'" by The Mamas & the Papas). "Veikko Nieminen" brought a more sociological aspect to the lyrics in connection with the new age.

Kansa also studied singing at the Sibelius Academy from 1974 to 1978, and in the late 1970s, he enlarged his repertoire: The album Moment Musical (1978) was made in co-operation with Heikki Sarmanto, who arranged a musical version of Eino Leino's lyrics into the album. Another artist on the album was Maija Hapuoja. In 1987, Kansa recorded the classic "Hopeinen Kuu" ("Silver Moon") and the album Betonimylläri, containing poetry by Lauri Viita. 1988 brought Oskari Merikannon kauneimmat laulut. The album Kultaniityt (1994 introduced, among some translated songs, also Kansa as a songwriter. On the album Päivä jolloin rakastat ("The day you love", 1999), Kansa interpreted Argentinian tangos, while Valaistu ikkuna ("The lit window") included Finnish film songs. The album Salaisuudessain ("In my secret", 2002) was a return to the pop music style, and a new direction came in autumn 2004, when Kansa interpreted Tapio Rautavaara's songs on the album Tapsa ja Rautavaara.

In 2002, Kansa appeared in the Pojat group formed by Danny and Markku Aro, performing hit songs by the artists from the 1960s.

In 2006, Kansa released the album Kulkumies ("The traveller"), which he wrote the lyrics to and co-arranged the melodies with Kassu Halonen. In the same year, Kansa was nominated for the Iskelmä-Finlandia prize.

Kansa wrote and arranged his own works. He also appeared in theatre and operettas and acted on TV. In 1987, Kansa was awarded the Erikois-Emma prize.

Kansa was of partial Russian descent. He died from complications of gallbladder surgery at Kymenlaakso Central Hospital in Kotka, on 25 March 2025, at the age of 76.

== Discography ==
=== Albums ===
Year	Album	Peak positions
Year	Album	FIN
1995	Joulun rakkaimmat laulut	22
1996	Unessani nainen tanssii	23
1997	Juhlalevy	9
1999	Päivä jolloin rakastat	18
2000	Valaistu ikkuna	27
2002	Salaisuudessain	20
2004	Tapsa ja Rautavaara - lauluja elämän poluilta	5
2007	40-v. juhlalevy	24
2009	Rakkautta on, rauhaa ei	34
2013	Särkyneen toiveen katu	11
2018	Sielunlaulu	49

== See also ==
- List of best-selling music artists in Finland
