= Erkki Junkkarinen =

Finnish singer (1929–2008)

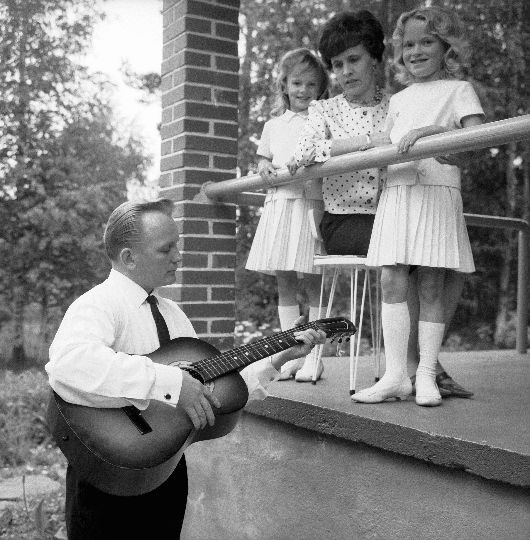
- Junkkarinen with his family in 1962

Background information
- Also known as: Eki, Pakilan satakieli
- Born: April 22, 1929; Suonenjoki
- Died: April 9, 2008 (aged 78) Hämeenlinna
- Genres: tango, humppa, iskelmä, valse
- Occupation: Singer
- Instrument: Singing
- Formerly of: Symphony (1947)

Erkki Aukusti Junkkarinen (22 April 1929 in Suonenjoki – 9 April 2008 in Hämeenlinna) was a Finnish singer. He was the most popular musical artist in 1970s Finland when he got his first platinum record for the album Ruusuja hopemaljassa along 11 gold records.

His recordings include ”Ruusuja hopeamaljassa”, ”Lappeenrantaan”, ”Nuoruusmuistoja”, ”Keinumorsian” and ”Kappale kauneinta Suomea”.

== Biography ==
=== Childhood and early career ===
Junkkarinen was born in Suonenjoki on 22 April 1929 and grew up in a small hut located the Iilisvesi neighbourhood, where his neighbour was lyricist and composer Lauri Jauhiainen. When he was 14 the moved with his family to Lappeenranta, where he began to perform as a soloist for the local Symphony orchestra alongside his main job in 1947.

He took part in his first song contest in Helsinki in 1948. The main judge of the competition Eero Väre suggested that he should contact the production manager of Fazer Music, Toivo Kärki, for an audition and recording. Kärki was indeed impressed by Junkkarinen's skills, although the first record ended up being published two years later, before which Junkkarinen had already won the first couplet and iskelmä music championship, held at the Helsinki Workers' House in 1950.

=== Beginning of recording career ===
He became popular in 1950 with his first recording, "Yksinäinen harmonikka", a russian tune, after which Toivo Kärki wrote him numerous songs over a few years, including "Harhakuva", "Soita hiljaa kitarain" and "Tuija, tehtaan tyttö". "Imatran Inkeri", written by Kärki and Reino Helismaa, became the 3rd most popular record of the autumn of 1951 in Finland. Along his first recording he started to tour with Heelismaa, Esa Pakarinen, and Per-Erik Förars. After 1954 Junkkarinen's popularity started to wane and the interval between recordings became increasingly longer until stopping all together. His co-operation with Toivo Kärki also ended. In 1957 Junkkarinen would move to Helsinki where he would work at a wholesale store. He would sporadicly perform alongside his main work, eventially getting a regular performing spot at the dancing saloon Mikado.

In the 1960s Junkkarinen recorded only made seven recordings, including “Ruusut hopeamaljassa,” which Eugen Malmstén had recorded decades earlier; however, Junkkarinen’s version was not very successful. His contract with Mikado ended in 1968, after which Junkkarinen went on a performing tour and noticed that his popularity had recovered, especially in Ostrobothnia. He switched record labels and in November 1970 recorded his first album Vanhaan hyvään aikaan as the lead singer of Pauli Granfelt’s band; it was released by Blue Master.

Erkki Junkkarinen’s 25th-anniversary artist celebration was held at the Kulttuuritalo in Helsinki in the spring of 1974 with the help of PSO and MTV. At the end of that same year, Junkkarinen’s wife died unexpectedly at their home while Junkkarinen was on tour.

=== Popularity boom ===
In 1975, Junkkarinen re-recorded the song "Ruusut hopeamaljassa" under the title "Ruusuja hopeamaljassa". He received the first Finnish platinum record ever for his album with the same title, rising to exceptional popularity. Junkkarinen’s other albums released in the 1970s were also highly successful, earning him a total of 11 gold records. At the height of his popularity in 1976–1977, Junkkarinen performed every day for six months across Finland, becoming unable to visit his home for three months.

With Erkki Junkkarinen’s huge success, old dance music rose to great popularity in the mid-1970s. Around the same time, newcomer Pekka Himanka scored a hit with the folk tune "Kankaan kaunis Katriina". Record producer Jaakko Salo analyzed the resurgence of traditional iskelmä as a counter-reaction to the pop-iskelmä aimed at the youth that dominated the early 1970s:

   "Expensive pop records had been produced using multitrack technology at a cost of 150,000 marks. Junkkarinen sold in a row 11 gold records of traditional Finnish iskelmä. The records using violin and accordion music cost only 20,000–30,000 marks each. It was quite a lesson and highlighted the hollowness of the 1970s."[9]

With his popularity and large performance fees Junkkarinen had a brick house built in Riihimäki. He moved there with his wife from Pakila in Helsinki around Midsummer in 1977.

=== End days ===
As the 1980s began, Junkkarinen’s popularity and demand began to wane rapidly, and the money he made from performances declined. Record releases also became less frequent: for example, in 1982 he released only one new album, which received little attention, while the rest were reissues. Junkkarinen, however, continued performing into the 2000s.

During his retirement years, he settled in Hämeenlinna. Junkkarinen died of a sudden illness at his home on 9 April 2008. His wife found him dead in his own armchair. Paramedics who arrived at the scene pronounced Junkkarinen dead after unsuccessful resuscitation efforts. He is buried at the Vuorentaa Cemetery in Hämeenlinna (section 20, row 1, plot 44).

== Artistic style ==
Junkkarinen was a skilled whistler, and this talent earned him the well-known nickname "The Nightingale of Pakila". Junkkarinen’s whistling can be heard, for example, on Olavi Virta’s 1960 recording "Sydänsuruja". He was awarded a state artist’s pension in 1990.

In his memoir published in 1982, Toivo Kärki reflected on his collaboration with Junkkarinen in the early 1950s: "Erkki Junkkarinen also toured with my orchestra and recorded my compositions; he was usually the quickest of the singers to learn. If a new song was added to the repertoire, I’d play it twice and Eki would know it." According to Kärki, Junkkarinen didn’t know how to read sheet music at all. Junkkarinen said in an interview in the 2000s that it was Kärki who taught him to sing for the record, and that a big role model of his was Henry Theel. Veikko Tuomi described the 1970s in a biography written by Tapio Niemi: "Eki outshone us all; no one could complain about his success. But we have Eki to thank for the fact that his popularity pulled the rest of us along with him for one last time. We played gigs and made records."

Junkkarinen was very often accompanied by Erkki Friman’s band. He also recorded several songs composed by Friman. Junkkarinen’s most successful albums of the 1970s were released on the PSO label with Pauli Granfelt’s band.

In addition to the aforementioned, Erkki Junkkarinen’s best-known pop songs include (from the 1950s) "Kun yö on valoton" and (from the 1970s) "Pieni hetki", "Vesivehmaan jenkka", "Kappale kauneinta Suomea", and "Sinun kanssasi tähtisilmä". The humppa "Lappeenrantaan" became the theme song for the Lappeenranta Humppa Festival, which has been held since 1977. In the 1970s, Junkkarinen also re-recorded his earlier hits "Yksinäinen harmonikka", "Hopeahääpäivänä", and "Valssi menneiltä ajoilta". In 1989, he recorded his own version of Vladimir Vysotsky’s "Pesnja o druge". In total Junkkarinen recorded nearly 350 songs over the course of almost half a century, including 25 originals by Toivo Kärki. For a long time, Junkkarinen was the Finnish male singer with the longest active career, until Eino Grön surpassed him.

Opera singer Jorma Hynninen is Erkki Junkkarinen’s second cousin.

== Discography ==
=== Studio albums ===
- Vanhaan hyvään aikaan (1970)
- Konkaritanssit (1972)
- Pakilan satakieli (1974)
- Ruusuja hopeamaljassa (1975)
- Kohtauspaikka (1975)
- Nuoruusmuistoja (1976)
- Kauneimmat valssit (1976)
- Romantiikkaa ruusutarhassa (1977)
- Kappale kauneinta Suomea (1977)
- Me käymme joulun viettohon (1977)
- Sireenien aikaan (1978)
- Tulisuudelma (1978)
- Iloista romanttista juhlaa (1979)
- Onnen maljat (1980)
- Ystävän laulu (1989)
- Sua ilman (1990)
- Tunteiden tiellä (1996)

=== Anthologies ===
- Erkki Junkkarinen 1−2 (Finnlevy, 1969)
- Erkki Junkkarinen 3−4 (Finnlevy, 1974)
- Eri esittäjiä: 16 tähteä – 16 iskelmää (Finndisc, 1975)
- Erkki Junkkarinen − Parhaimmat 1−2 (PSO, 1976)
- Erkki Junkkarinen − Unohtumattomat 1−2 (Finnlevy, 1978)
- Hopeahääpäivänä (Finnlevy, 1981)
- Erkki Junkkarinen − Parhaat (Finnlevy, 2-LP, 1991)
- Erkki Junkkarinen - Unohtumattomat (Finnlevy, 1993)
- 20 suosikkia – Ruusuja hopeamaljassa (Warner Music, 1996)
- 20 suosikkia – Siks’ oon mä suruinen (Warner Music, 2002)
- 20 suosikkia – Tulisuudelma (Warner Music, 2003)
- Erkki Junkkarinen muistoissamme (Valitut Palat, 3-CD, 2008)
- Musiikin mestareita: Erkki Junkkarinen − Laulajan muisto (Warner Music, 2-CD, 2008)
- Ystävän laulu − 25 unohtumatonta laulua (sisältää albumit Ystävän laulu ja Sua ilman) (2008)
- Soi laulu kaunehin (2009)

== See also ==
- List of best-selling music artists in Finland
