= Anna Hanski =

Finnish singer and actress

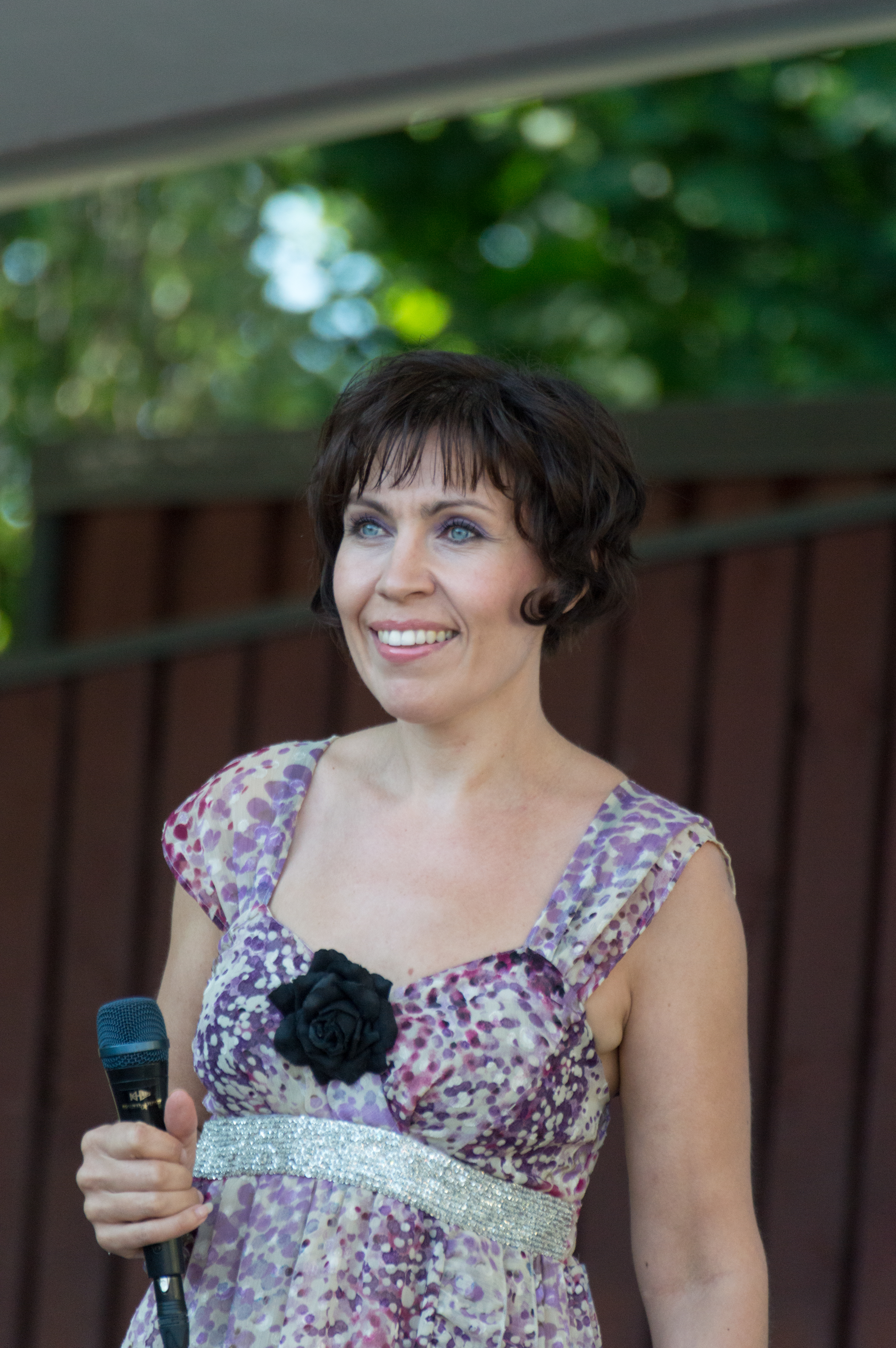
- Hanski in 2012

Background information
- Born: Anna Milanja Hanski; 6 September 1970 (age 55); Helsinki, Finland
- Genres: Pop; Schlager
- Occupations: Singer; actress
- Instrument: Vocals
- Years active: 1988–present
- Labels: Ensio Music; Musiikki-Fazer; Sony BMG

Anna Milanja Hanski (born 6 September 1970) is a Finnish singer and actress. Her most famous songs include "Tunteisiin", which became the intro of Salatut elämät, "Jos et sä soita" and "Kotiviini". Since 2021, Hanski owns the Konnustupa summer restaurant located in Leppävirta.

== Career ==
Hanski started her music career at the age of 17. She released her first self-titled album in 1989, which went platinum. The next album Sykysiesen unet went gold, after which her popularity was at its peak. Her fourth album Jos et sä soita still also double platinum.

In 1993, Hanski recorded the English-language album Gypsies & Indians with singer-songwriter Lee Hazlewood. Before that, Hanski had recorded several songs from Hazlewood in Finnish, the most famous of which is Hazlewood's "Kotiviini" ("Summer Wine") made famous by Nancy Sinatra. Hanski presented the song in Finnish in 1990 with Pekka Kaasalainen playing and singing in Vilperin Perikunta. The song is also featured in English with Hazlewood as a duet with the album "Gypsies & Indians".

Hanski's popularity was at its peak in the early 1990s, when she recorded for Ensio Music. After that, she moved to Warner Music Finland where she released two albums, Sanat pienentiki and Sydämä asuata. After leaving Warner Music, Hanski released two albums for BMG Finland/SonyBMG in 1999 and 2006.

Hanski has acted in Rauma City Theater, Hämeenlinna's Uude Kesäteatteri and Taaborinvuori Summer Theater, among others.

== Personal life ==
Hanski is the daughter of singer Seppo Hanski. Her grandfather was actor Pehr-Olof Siren, and her step-grandmother is Anja Pohjola. She is the sister of Pinja Hanski, Janus Hanski and Petra Hanski. Hanski married musician Leri Leskinen in 1994 and they had a daughter, Nenna, in 1994. She also has a daughter Alina born in 1999 with Jyrki Jefremoff. Hanski dated and lived with Jefremoff in Töölö, Helsinki, between 1997 and 2007.

Hanski became a grandmother in the spring of 2018. She is currently in a relationship with Aku Nyyssönen and they reside in Jätkäsaari, Helsinki.

Hanski was appointed a UNICEF Goodwill Ambassador in 1993.

== Discography ==
Studio albums

- Anna Hanski (1989)
- Syksyiset unet (1991)
- Mä uskon joulupukkiin (1992)
- Jos et sä soita (1992)
- Odotan sua laiturilla (1993)
- Gypsies & Indians (1993)
- Sanat pienetkin (1995)
- Sydämessä asutaan (1996)
- Minä tahdon sinut (1999)
- Hyvä näin (2006)

== Filmography ==
Anna Hanski was featured in the nostalgic film by Juha Tapaninen, "Iskelmäprinssi" (1991), featuring a bargain for a bus driver. The soundtrack on the movie was heard by songs by Jukka Alihanga, singing by Anna, "Nukke rakastui nukkeen", "Mustikkasuu" and "Hiekkakuopalle uimaan". The latter had a duet pair Pekka (Kaasalainen).

== See also ==
- List of best-selling music artists in Finland
