= Joulutorttu (album) =

Studio album by Eläkeläiset
- Released: December 2002
- Genre: Humppa
- Label: Stupido

Joulutorttu is a Christmas album by Eläkeläiset. It was released in December 2002 by Stupido Records, and spent two weeks in the Finnish top 10 album chart.

The mini-album contains 4 humppa-songs, all composed for this album. The songs on Joulutorttu are:

1. Yksinäinen joulu ("Lonely Christmas") – sung by Kristian Voutilainen (music/words – Voutilainen)
2. Humpaton joulu ("Christmas without humppa") – sung by Martti Varis Ja Petteri Halonen ja Tapio Santaharju (music/words – Martti Varis)
3. Täydellinen joulu ("Perfect Christmas") – sung by Onni Varis (music/words – Onni Varis)
4. Pahvinen joulu ("Cardboard Christmas") – sung by Lassi Kinnunen (music – Voutilainen, words – Onni Varis)

Players on the album were: Onni Varis, Martti Varis, Lassi Kinnunen, and Kristian Voutilainen. Marita Koskelo is credited as a special guest. The album was recorded and mixed by Kristian Voutilainen, and mastered by Mika Jussila Mukana Soitaa Petteri Halonen JA Tapio Santaharju SOITAA RUMPUJA MUKANA Petteri Halonen Laulaa Lassi Kinnusen Kanssa Pahvinen joulu Kappaleen Martti Waris Laulaa Petteri Terävän Kanssa Ja Petteri Halonen Laulaa Lassi Kinnusen Kanssa Humpaton joulu Mukana Laulaa Onni Waris ja Kristian Voutilaisten kanssa Humpaton joulu Kappaleen
