= Jope Ruonansuu =

Finnish actor (1964–2020)

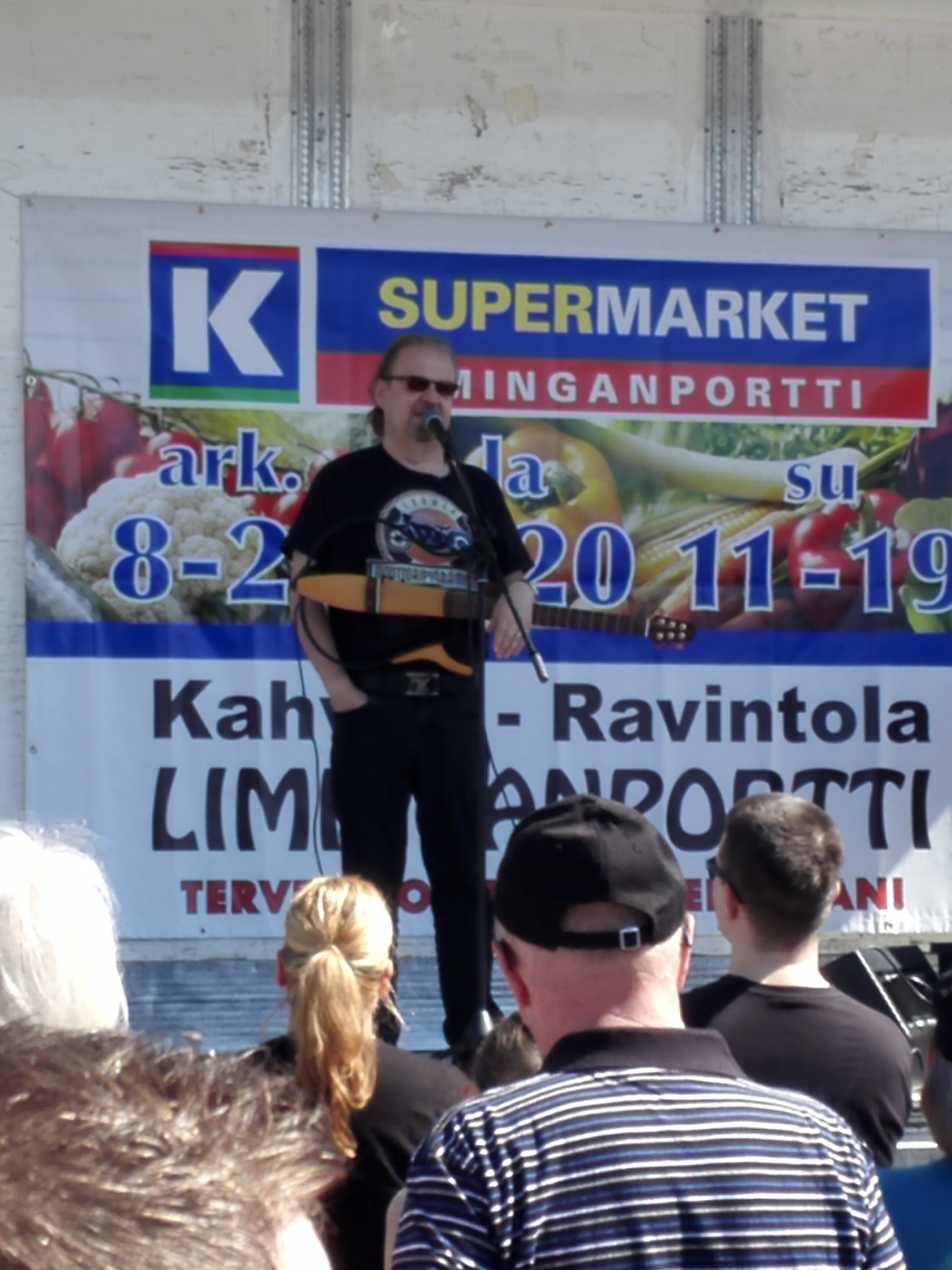
- Ruonansuu performing in 2016
- Born: Jorma Olavi Ruonansuu; 15 April 1964; Kemi, Finland
- Died: 18 July 2020 (aged 56); Heinola, Finland
- Occupations: Actor; comedian; impressionist; singer-songwriter; musician; record producer
- Years active: 1983–2018
- Children: 3
- Musical career
- Genres: Comedy; parody
- Instruments: Vocals; drums; bass; guitar; harmonica; saxophone; transverse flute
- Labels: EMI; Parlophone; Audiovox; Edel; Sony

Jorma Olavi "Jope" Ruonansuu (15 April 1964 – 18 July 2020) was a Finnish actor, impressionist, musician and comedian. He was born in Kemi. He won the Best performer Venla award in 2010.

Ruonansuu was diagnosed with esophageal cancer in 2018. He died from the disease on 18 July 2020, aged 56.

== Career ==
Ruonansuu began his career as an imitator and comedian at the age of 16. He appeared on Klaus Thomasson's Klaustrofobia- comedy show in the 1980s. In 1987, Ruonansuu was approached by Finnish musicians M. A. Numminen & Pedro Hietanen, and in the autumn of 1988 his debut studio album Matkiva Kulkuri was released by EMI Finland. In 1989, he released a sketch-comedy series by the same name with Visa Mäkinen. The following year, he met record producer Ilkka Vainio, and the two struck a partnership that lasted until 2010, when Ruonansuu moved to Sony Music.

Ruonansuu's breakthrough came through local radio stations. In the late 1980s, he began hosting a comedy radio show in Kemi by the name of Elvis-osasto, together with Jari Vesa. Soon they were joined by a third one, Tommi Reponen. The program ended up achieving national popularity. The albums Jope Ruonansuu ja Elvis-osasto (1992) & Täällä Washington (1992) were certified gold in Finland and Ruonansuu became among the most popular Finnish imitators. Elvis-osasto also performed live with great success.

When Elvis-osasto ended, Ruonansuu & Reponen continued with the weekly Washington Bar -program. During 2002-2003, Ruonansuu made comedy sketches by the name of American Office with Juha Laitila, for various radio stations.

== Acting ==
As an actor, Ruonansuu starred in Timo Koivusalo's Pekko Aikamiespoika - series of movies as Heka Haimakainen, and as president Martti Ahtisaari in the Uuno Turhapuro - movies. He also collaborated with fellow actor Pirkka-Pekka Petelius, and they scripted and acted in the sketch shows Neurovisio (1992), Herra 47 (1994), Hömppäveikot (1996), Ruonansuu & Petelius Co. (1997) and 6pack (2008). His most known series was Jopet-show, that aired on Yle TV2 from 26 January 2005, to 19 December 2011, with a total of 6 seasons consisting of 50 episodes. Ruonansuu also voice acted in some productions.

== Imitating ==
On his albums, Ruonansuu imitated many Finnish celebrities, including Martti Ahtisaari, Tarja Halonen, Matti Nykänen, & Kimi Räikkönen. Overall, he imitated around 150 people during his career.

== Musicianship ==
Ruonansuu's debut studio album Matkiva Kulkuri was produced by Pedro Hietanen. Later, he switched to Audiovox Records (later AXR Music). Ruonansuu's most successful albums are Työnnä kännykkä hanuriin (2002) and Finnshits (2003), having been certified platinum. In addition, nine of his other albums have been certified gold. A large part of Ruonansuu's music was parody music. In his most famous songs, he imitated features and manners of celebrities or exaggerated popular trends of the time. In addition to his comedy work, Ruonansuu composed and performed songs of more serious tone, usually scattered in his comedic albums. In 2008, Ruonansuu released a compilation album named Enkeleitä toisillemme - Herkimmät laulut. The album contained all of his serious songs up to that point. Ruonansuu was a multi-instrumentalist, being able to play guitar, saxophone, drums, bass, harmonica, and transverse flute. Ruonansuu produced or co-produced 6 of his albums.

== Personal life ==
In his youth, Ruonansuu became a target of school bullying, due to his weight. In addition, he had problems with alcohol usage.

Ruonansuu was married, and he fathered 3 children. Later in his life, he lived in Heinola.

In 1995, Ruonansuu was diagnosed with type 2 diabetes, and later he told about having suffered from heart problems. Ruonansuu suffered from excessive weight problems, and in March 2015 got a gastric bypass surgery, in which he lost 40 kilograms.

In the spring of 2018, Ruonansuu was diagnosed with esophageal cancer, and after his diagnosis, he retired from public appearances. He died in his home in Heinola on 18 July 2020, at the age of 56. He is buried in Kemi.

== Filmography ==
=== Films ===
- Ruuvit löysällä (1989) – singer
- Pekko aikamiespojan poikamiesaika (1993) – Heka Haimakainen
- Pekko ja poika (1994) – Heka Haimakainen
- Pekko ja muukalainen (1996) – Heka Haimakainen
- Pekko ja unissakävelijä (1997) – Heka Haimakainen
- Johtaja Uuno Turhapuro – pisnismies (1998) – President Ahtisaari
- Uuno Turhapuro – This Is My Life (2004) – President Ahtisaari
- Matti (2006) – Oksanen
- V2: Dead Angel (V2 – jäätynyt enkeli, 2007) – Police Lieutenant Hautavainio
- Ganes (2007) – Remu's boss
- The Storage (2011)

=== Television programs ===
- Klaustrofobia (1982)
- Vesku Show (1988)
- Viemäri-TV (1989)
- Neurovisio (1992)
- Jopen videokoulu (1993)
- Herra 47 (1994)
- Hömppäveikot (1996)
- Ruonansuu & Petelius Co. (1997)
- Team Ahma (1998–1999)
- Ö-studio (1998–1999)
- Koivula ja tähdet (2000)
- Jurismia! (2001)
- Jopet Show (2005–2011)
- 6pack (2008)
- Hymy Pyllyyn (2008–2009)

== Discography ==
=== Albums ===
- Matkiva kulkuri (1988)
- Elvis-osasto (1992)
- Täällä Washington (1992)
- Politiikkaa ja erotiikkaa (1993)
- Jope Ruonansuu presidentiksi (1993)
- Kiikun kaakun (1994)
- Washington Bar (1995)
- Piinapenkki (1996)
- Vara Mara (1997)
- Neuroopan omistajat (1999)
- Hauskaa joulua t: Jope (2000)
- Lomakiertue (2001)
- Työnnä kännykkä hanuriin (2002)
- Finnshits (2003)
- Tosi-CD (2004)
- Me hirviöt (2006)
- Tanssii läskien kanssa (2007)
- Enkeleitä toisillemme – Herkimmät laulut (2008)
- Kunnioittaen – Yhden miehen tribuutti (2009)
- Naamakirja (2010)
- Veljekset Kuin Kyljykset (2012)
- Jope Ruonansuu ja Porsaanperän pikkujoulut (2013)
- Biisinmurtajat (2016)

=== Singles ===
- Nyt lähtee läskit / Rantamiehen balladi (1991)
- Hyppää pois / Ilman jarruja helvettiin (1991)
- Pappi vaan joi (1995)
- Kaikki menee kun sovittelee / Mattiesko Hytönen (1997)
- Soneranputsausjenkka (1999)
- Umtsi-um (2002)
- Annelin silmin / Stressmann (2003)
- Aulis Gerlander / Haluan Aidoliksi (2004)
- Yllytyshullu / Matti on numero yksi (2004)
- Enkeleitä toisillemme – Äiti (promo, 2008)
- Katsastusinssi Nauraa (2011)
- Loirinuotiolla (2016)

== Bibliography ==
- Jopen pahimmat. Gummerus. 2002. ISBN 978-951-20-6196-9.
- Sikapieni Hiace. Gummerus. 2003. ISBN 978-951-20-6425-0.
- Hii-ala housuja hoi!. Gummerus. 2004. ISBN 978-951-20-6644-5.
- Aatteleppa ite!. Gummerus. 2006. ISBN 951-20-6935-0.
- Parhaat Jopet. Helsinki-kirjat. 2010. ISBN 978-952-58-7424-2.

== See also ==
- List of best-selling music artists in Finland
