= Humppaelämää =

Studio album by Eläkeläiset
- Released: 2003
- Genre: Humppa
- Producer: Kristian Voutilainen

Humppaelämää is a 2003 album by the Finnish group Eläkeläiset. This is the first Eläkeläiset album in which none of the tracks are covers.

== Track listing ==
1. Humppaelämää - 3.20
2. Katkolla humppa - 2.57
3. Humppa-Aatami - 2.16
4. Unelmahumppa - 3.35
5. Lauantaitanssit - 3.26
6. Lusijan Humppa - 3:35
7. Keväthumppa - 3.00
8. Ona vaan - 3.04
9. Humppashokki - 2.51
10. Humppaäimä - 3.43
11. Pesu- ja linkoushumppa - 2.02
12. Humppasäteilyä - 1.59
13. Nynnyhumppa - 2.09
14. Haudalle kukkia - 1.40
