= Yölintu =

Finnish schlager band

- Origin: Pori, Finland
- Genres: Schlager
- Years active: 1992–present
- Labels: Warner Music Finland (1997–2007); AllStar Music (2009–)
- Members: Simo Silmu; Matti Silmu; Joni Leino; Jari Luostari; Jukka Harju
- Past members: Markus Kuusijoensuu
- Website: www.yolintu.fi

Yölintu (Finnish for "night bird") is a Finnish schlager band from Pori. The band was formed by Simo Silmu and Markus Kuusijoensuu in 1992.

The band has sold over 338,579 records, which makes it one of the best-selling music artists in Finland.

== Band members ==
Current members

- Simo Silmu – vocals, accordion (1992–present)
- Matti Silmu – guitar
- Joni Leino – drums
- Jari Luostari – bass guitar
- Jukka Harju – guitar

Former members (incomplete)

- Markus Kuusijoensuu – lead guitar
- Mikko Taipale - drums

== Discography ==
=== Albums ===
- Yölintu laskeutuu (1993)
- Pieni lintunen (1994)
- Kaikki kohdallaan (1997)
- Tositarkoituksella (1998)
- Pienen pojan haaveet (2000)
- Sitä saa mitä tilaa (2001)
- Tää on rankkaa (2002)
- Mennyttä miestä (2005)
- Haavoittumaton (2007)
- Nyt ja aina (2009)
- Iso lemmen pala – Baddingin jalanjäljissä... (2011)
- Minne maailma kuljettaa (2012)
- Maailma on kauneimillaan (2018)

=== Compilation albums ===
- Mahdunko maailmaas – kaikki parhaat (2003)
- Tanssin taikaa – 16 hittiä (2006)
- Hetkiin menneisiin – suurimmat laulut (2009)
- 20 suosikkia – Mä putoan (2013)
