= Suvi Teräsniska =

Finnish singer

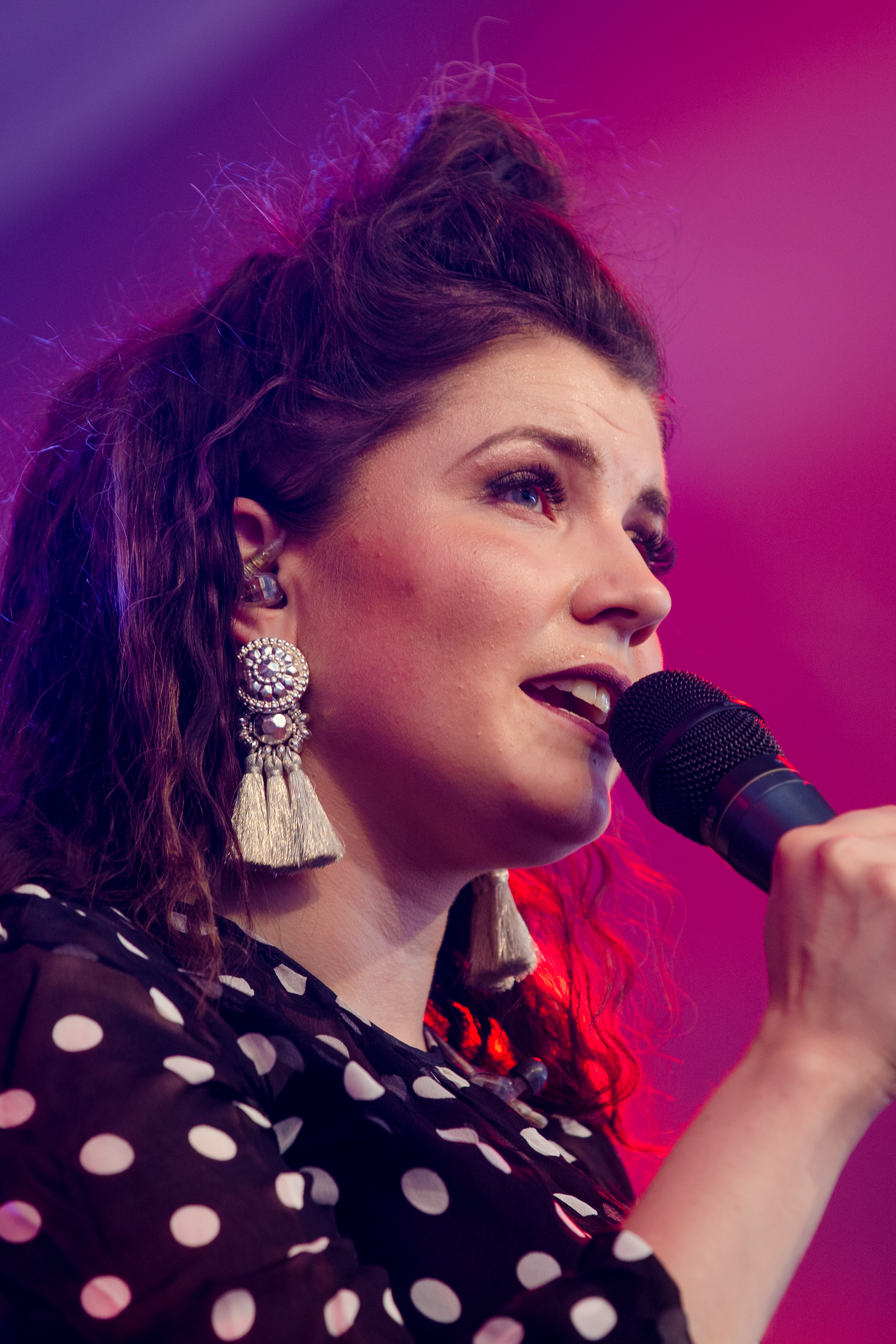
- Suvi Teräsniska in 2018

Background information
- Born: Suvi Pirjo Sofia Teräsniska; 10 April 1989 (age 36); Kolari, Finland
- Genres: Schlager music Suomipop
- Occupation: Singer
- Instrument: Vocals
- Years active: 2008 – present
- Labels: Warner Music Finland
- Website: www.suviterasniska.fi

Suvi Pirjo Sofia Teräsniska (born in Kolari, Finland on 10 April 1989) is a Finnish singer signed with Warner Music Finland. She made her breakthrough with her single "Hento kuiskaus" (2008) from her debut album Särkyneiden sydänten tie.

Teräsniska has been married since 2014 and has three children.

== Discography ==
=== Albums ===
Year	Album	Charts	Certification
Year	Album	FIN	Certification
2008	Särkyneiden sydänten tie	11	Gold
2009	Tulkoon joulu	1	Gold
2010	Rakkaus päällemme sataa	2	Double platinum
2011	Pahalta piilossa	3	Platinum
2013	Hän Tanssi Kanssa Enkeleiden	1	
2013	Pohjantuuli	1	
2014	Joulun henki	5	
2016	Sinä olet kaunis	1	
2019	Ihmisen poika	3	
2020	Iltalauluja		
2021	Tämä maailma tarvitsee joulun	1	
2024	Seuraavassa elämässä	1	
2025	Iltalauluja II	6	

=== Compilations ===
Year	Album	Charts
Year	Album	FIN
2015	Täydellinen elämä – Suurimmat hitit	6

== See also ==
- List of best-selling music artists in Finland
