= Eläkeläiset =

Finnish humppa band

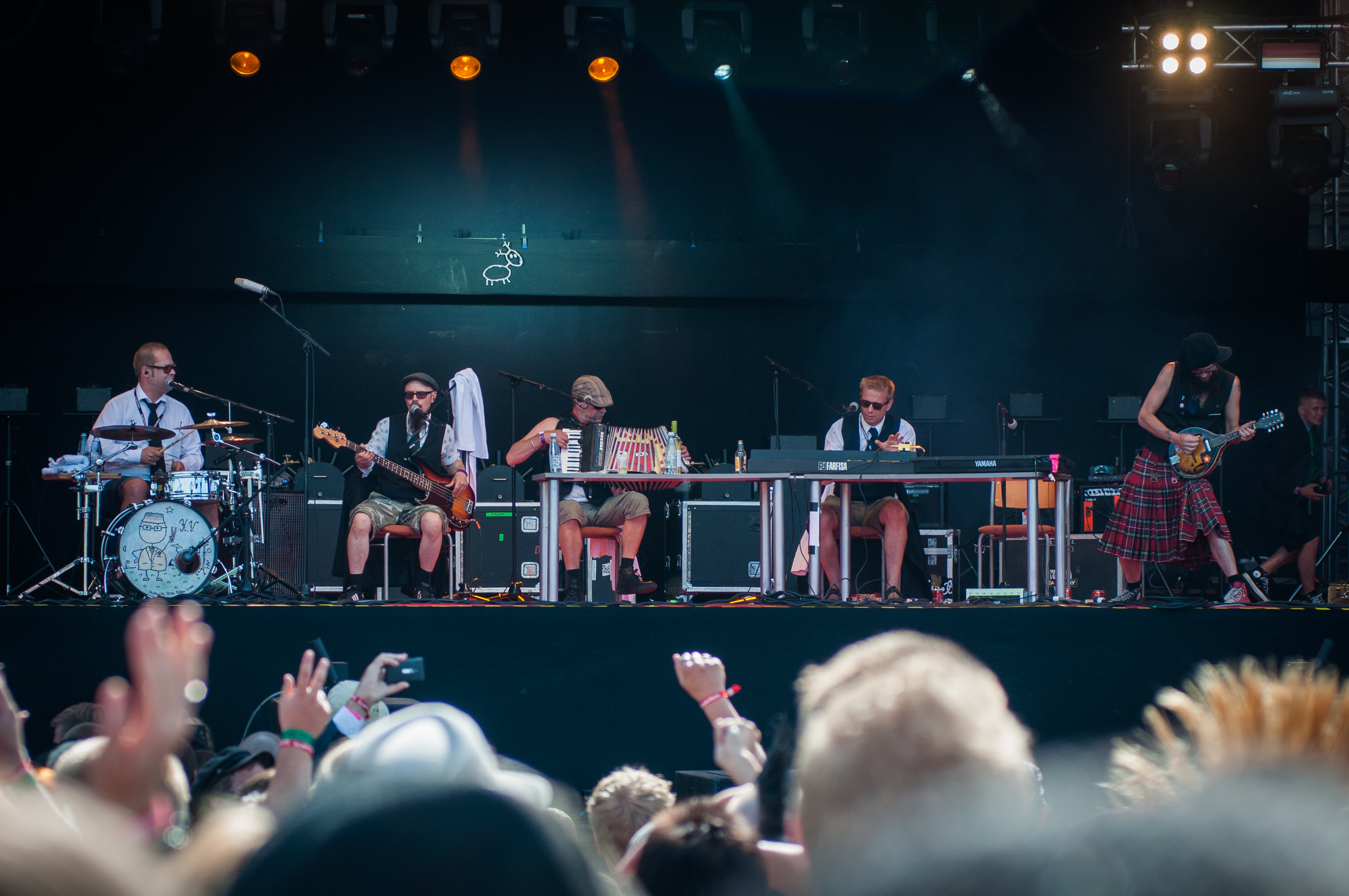
- Eläkeläiset at the Ilosaarirock festival in 2013.

Background information
- Origin: Finland
- Genres: Humppa, Jenkka
- Years active: 1993–present
- Members: Onni Waris; Petteri Halonen; Lassi Kinnunen; Martti Waris; Tapio Santaharju
- Past members: Ema Hurskainen
- Website: www.humppa.com

"Päivätanssit" (Pahvische, 2002)
A cover of the 1988 Pet Shop Boys hit "Domino Dancing".

Eläkeläiset (Finnish for "pensioners") are a Finnish humppa band founded in 1993.

Current members of the band are Onni Waris (keyboard, vocals), Petteri Halonen (keyboard, guitar, vocals), Lassi Kinnunen (accordion, vocals), Martti Waris (bass, vocals), and Tapio Santaharju (drums, vocals). Ilmari Koivuluhta (sound technique, logistics) and Pekka Jokinen (graphics, merchandise) complete the "humppa family". According to the band's statements, they play between 80 and 100 concerts per year, of which only 20 in Finland and 40 to 50 in Germany, due to their popularity there. They have visited several big international music festivals, including heavy metal festivals such as Wacken Open Air and Tuska Open Air.

Eläkeläiset mainly play cover versions of famous pop and rock hits in a fast humppa or slow jenkka style with Finnish lyrics. They also publish bootleg recordings of their own concerts.

Eläkeläiset are very popular among some OpenBSD developers and frequently played at their hackathons, where they claim they are "thwarting evil with humppa and math."

Eläkeläiset was one of the nominees to represent Finland in Eurovision Song Contest 2010.

== Discography ==
- Joulumanteli (1994, published only as a tape)
- Humppakäräjät (1994, album)
- Humppalöyly (1995, EP)
- Pyjamahumppa (1995, single)
- Humpan Kuninkaan Hovissa (1995, album)
- In Humppa We Trust (1996, live album)
- Dementikon Keppihumppa / Take Me To The City (1997, single)
- Humppamaratooni (1997, album) - its title track is a humppa arrangement of Whiskey in the Jar.
- Sensational Monsters Of Humppa (1998, single)
- Humppaorgiat (1999, EP with censored songs)
- Werbung, Baby! (1999, album)
- Huipputähtien Ykköshitit (1999, single)
- Humpan Kuninkaan Hovissa (2000, album, re-release incl. additional songs)
- Ja Humppa Soi (2000, single)
- Humppa-Akatemia (2000, double album)
- Humppa Till We Die (2000, CD)
- Humppa! (2001, compilation)
- Jenkkapolkkahumppa (2001, EP)
- Joulutorttu (2002, EP)
- Pahvische (2002, album)
- Katkolla Humppa (2003, EP)
- Keväthumppa (2003, EP)
- Humppaelämää (2003, album)
- Jukolan Humppa (2005, single)
- Humppasirkus (2006, album)
- Das Humppawerk (2006, EP)
- Humppakonsertto (2007, live album)
- Humppa United (2008, album)
- Humppabingo (2009, 2CD, compilation)
- Humpan Kuninkaan Hovissa (2010, album, re-release incl. bonus tracks)
- Humppasheikkailu (2012, album)
- Humppakalmisto (2013, album)
- Humppa of Finland (2017, album)
- Humppainfarkt (2018, EP)

== See also ==
- Mambo Kurt
