= Mamba (band) =

Finnish schlager band formed in 1984

- Origin: Pori, Finland
- Genres: Schlager
- Years active: 1984–present
- Labels: Free Agent Records
- Members: Tero Vaara; Timo Mynttinen; Pete Nikkinen; Harri Lehtonen; Antti Snellman
- Website: www.mamba.fi

Mamba is a Finnish schlager band formed in Pori in 1984.

With over 372,967 records sold, Mamba is one of the best-selling music artists in Finland.

== Band members ==
Current members

- Tero Vaara – vocals, guitar
- Timo Mynttinen – bass guitar
- Pete Nikkinen – keyboards
- Harri Lehtonen – drums
- Antti Snellman – saxophone

== Discography ==
=== Albums ===
- Mamba (1985)
- Lauantai-ilta (1986)
- Syksy (1987)
- Tunteellisella tuulella (1989)
- Pitkä vapaa (1992)
- Kummitusjuttu (1994)
- Lähdössä (1995)
- Kuume (1996)
- Kipinä (1997)
- Sodassa ja rakkaudessa (2000)
- Meille vai teille (2002)
- Joulualbumi (2003)
- Mä tein sen taas (2006)
- Toinen elämä (2008)
- Kaipuun sanomat (2009)
- Kuuma rakkaus (2011)

=== Compilation albums ===
- Parhaat (1989)
- 20 suosikkia – Mitä yhdestä särkyneestä sydämestä (1995)
- Kytkin paskana: 23 hittiä albumeilta Tuntellisella tuulella & Sydänmailla (1996)
- 20 suosikkia – Pieni lemmenleikki (1997)
- Vaaran vuodet 1984–1999 (2CD, 1999)
- Vaaran vuodet 1984–1999 (4CD, 1999)
- Vaara Tero & Mamba – Suomihuiput (2003)
- Lempikappaleita 1984–2004 (2004)

=== DVDs ===
- Konserttilavalla (2004)
