= Joel Hallikainen =

Finnish singer

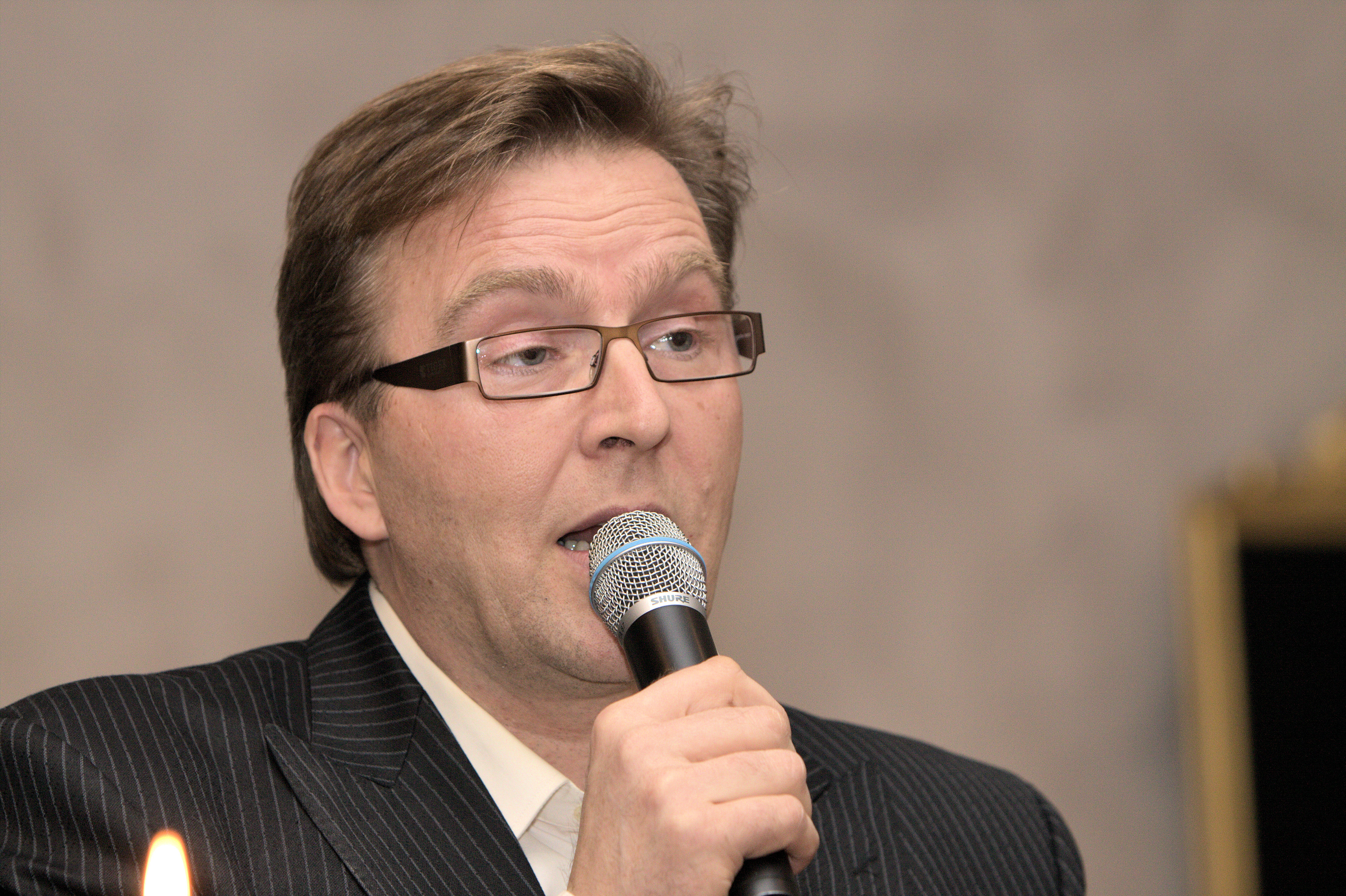

Background information
- Born: October 11, 1961 (age 64); Turku, Finland
- Genres: Schlager music, Children's song, Gospel music, New wave
- Occupation: Singer
- Instrument(s): Vocals, guitar
- Years active: 1979 – present
- Website: www.joelhallikainen.com

Joel Hallikainen (born October 11, 1961, in Turku, Finland) is a Finnish musician and entertainer. Hallikainen worked in Wärtsilä shipyard as a welder in late 1970s and played guitar in a new wave band Korroosio. In 1990 Hallikainen started his solo career as a Schlager singer.

== Discography ==
=== Albums ===
Schlager albums

Year	Album	Peak positions	Classification
Year	Album	FIN	Classification
1992	Joel Hallikainen		Multiple platinum
1993	Anna vierellesi tulla		3× platinum
1995	Kellastuneet kirjeet	6	Gold
1996	Joulurauhaa (Christmas album)	37	
1997	Yksin	11	Gold
1999	Kun maailma elää	20	
2000	Onnenpyörässä	–	
2001	Hyvää Joulua (Christmas album)	–	
2002	Enkeli pieni	38	
2006	Puhu minulle	–	
2007	Miljoonan ruusun maa	–	
2008	Kauneimmat joululaulut (Christmas album)	–	
2013	Kaunis Elämä	48	

Children albums

- 1985: Jakke & Jokke: Jakke & Jokke ja lapset
- 1990: Laulava taikuri telmus
- 1992: Telmuksen taikatalo
- 1994: Halipula
- 2006: Telmus taikatakki
- 2011: Riemuralli

Gospel albums

- 2004: ...Mutta suurin niistä on RAKKAUS
- 2005: Rakkautta etsimässä
- 2007: Tule rauhan henki
- 2009: Sanaton ikävä
- 2012: Kahdet askeleet

Compilation albums

- 1995: Joel Hallikainen konserttilavalla
- 1997: 20 suosikkia – Kuurankukka
- 2003: Kaikki parhaat – 40 hittiä
- 2007: Surun sillalla (compilation album)
- 2010: Gospel parhaat (3 CD collection)
- 2011: Joel Hallikainen: Parhaat (Christmas song collections)

Other collaborations

- 1998: Kimpasa (with Timo Koivusalo)
