= Erkki Ruuhinen =

Finnish designer (born 1943)

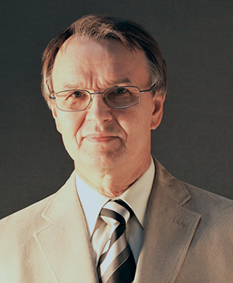
Erkki Ruuhinen

Erkki Ruuhinen (born 3 September 1943 in Toivakka, Finland) is a Finnish graphic designer specializing in business emblems, logos and design management. He is also known for his film posters and his calligraphic and typographic work.

== Design projects ==
In 1993-1994 Ruuhinen made the visual redesign of Kesko Group and its four retail companies: K-lähikauppa, K-market, K-supermarket and Citymarket.

In addition, his company has designed logos and visual style for the following companies, products and communities: Ilmarinen Pension Insurance Company, Labsystems Oy, Marja Kurki Design, Garantia Insurance Company, Orion Diagnostica, The City of Helsinki, Helsinki Waterworks, Heureka the Finnish Science Center, Marketing Institute, The Association of Finnish Advertisers, Tampere Hall, Expomark, Pellervo Confederation of Finnish Cooperatives, Turva Insurance Company, WSOY Company Books, Valtra Valmet, Vantaa Energy, Yellow Transport, Crafts Association Taito Group and Taito-Shop retail stores, Jyväskylä Educational Consortium and Jyväskylä Institute of Adult Education.

== Film posters ==
In addition to his industrial work, Ruuhinen has designed posters for films and other cultural events. In particular, he has designed posters for most of the films directed or produced by Jörn Donner. These include the two posters for the Academy Award winning film Fanny and Alexander by Ingmar Bergman in 1982. Some of his film posters were exhibited in Amos Andersson art museum in 1993 in the 25th anniversary exhibition of Jörn Donner Productions.

The following museums have Ruuhinen's posters in their collection: Lahden julistetaiteen museo, Lahti, Finland, Stedelijk Museum Amsterdam, International Poster Museum, Warsaw, Muss d’Affiche, Paris, and the Poster Museum of Musashino Art University, Tokyo.

== Calligraphy ==
Ruuhinen started his career in type design while working for Yle, the Finnish Broadcasting Company. He designed logos, titles and typography for the Yle TV1 studio before his studies in Mainosgraafikkojen koulu in 1964. In 1964 he started teaching calligraphy in a folk high school in Helsinki.

As a youngster, Ruuhinen was interested in calligraphy and type design. While working and studying he developed his skills with book covers, ex libris, logos and monograms. In 1966 he took part in Visual Graphics Corporation's international competition for type design in the USA. Later he took part in several exhibitions of typography and calligraphy in the USA. Several museums have Ruuhinen's calligraphic works in their collections.

== Awards / Prizes ==
- Finnish State Prize for Applied Arts, 1969, 1989
- Best Poster of the Year Award, Helsinki, 1968, 1969, 1970, 1971, 1972, 1973, 1976, 1978, 1979, 1980, 1981, 1982, 1983, 1984, 1985
- Silver Medal, Poster Biennale, Brno, 1970, 1974
- Silver Medal, Poster Biennale, Warsaw, 1972
- Gold Medal, Rizzoli Advertising Competition, Milan, 1972
- Film Expo Awards, Ottawa, 1972
- Gold, silver and bronze medals 1975 and silver medal 1977 and 1979, Poster Biennial, Lahti
- Communication Arts Awards, Palo Alto, 1978
- New Clio Awards, New York, 1979, 1980, 1982, 1983
- Type Directors Club Awards, New York, 1982, 1983, 1984, 1985
- Graphic Designers of the Year in Finland, 1985
- Special Platinum Award for Top Designer of the Year (Advertising and Graphic Design Competition), Helsinki, 1986, and about 40 awards in the same competition 1980-90
- The Bank Card of the Year in Europe, Frankfurt, 1992.
- Artist Professor, 1996–2001

== Sources ==
- Taiteen huipulta, The apex of the arts, Publisher: The Arts Council of Finland, Helsinki, 1998, ISBN 951-53-1655-3, Editor: Maria Mäkelä, pages 66–67 in Finnish, pages 68–69 in English.
- Erkki Ruuhinen Design, Helsinki 1985, Publisher: Erkki Ruuhinen Oy, ISBN 951-99638-6-3.
- Who's Who in Graphic Art, edited by Walter Amstutz, Dübendorf 1982
- Articles in magazines:
  - Graphis Magazine (Zürich): Erkki Ruuhinen Design, text by Richard Hayhurst, no. 255, May/June 1988, pages: 40–53.
  - Articles in Idea Magazine (Tokyo): Erkki Ruuhinen, text by Richard Hayhurst, no. 209, 1988, pages: 34–39.
  - Articles in Novum Gebrauchsgraphik (Munich): The Designer Erkki Ruuhinen, by Professor Dieter Urban, no. 12, 1986, pages 18–25.
- Kuka Kukin On, 2001, Otava, ISBN 951-1-17007-4.
