= Eero Akaan-Penttilä =

Finnish politician

Eero Erkki Emanuel Akaan-Penttilä (born April 17, 1943 in Heinola) is a Finnish politician and member of the parliament from the National Coalition Party. He was elected to Parliament of Finland in 1999.
