= Erkki Korhonen =

Finnish musician

Erkki Korhonen (born 1956 in Hämeenlinna) is a Finnish pianist, conductor and former director of the Finnish National Opera.

== Education ==
He graduated from the Sibelius Academy in 1983. Continuing his studies in piano, vocal accompaniment and conducting with such names as György Sebök, Dimitri Bashkirov, Tamas Vásáry and Hartmut Höll, he specialised in opera coaching. He worked under Max Epstein, Ubaldo Gardini and Alberto Zedda as well as Marc Belfort, Tamas Blum and Ralf Weikert at the Zurich Opera.

== Career ==
Becoming a lecturer at the renowned Sibelius Academy, from 1989 to 1997, Korhonen taught at numerous conservatories throughout Finland as well as coached for more than twenty years at the Finnish National Opera, the Savonlinna Opera Festival, the Zurich Opera and most recently at the Lyric Opera Studio of Weimar. In 1997 he was appointed the head of the International Opera Studio in Zurich and in 2001 he became the general director of the Finnish National Opera until 2007.

== Recognition and honors ==
Having performed as a soloist, as well as in chamber works, throughout Europe and North America, Korhonen has made several radio and television appearances. To honour his contributions to the arts, he received the Sibelius Medal from the Sibelius Society of Finland and the Medals of the cities Hämeenlinna and Helsinki.

== Board memberships ==
As artistic advisor and board member of various European festivals and music organisations such as the Mirjam Helin International Singing Competition, Korhonen often serves as a jury member at numerous competitions, e.g. Competizione del opera, Dresden, Queen Sonja International Music Competition, Lappeenranta singing competition, Marseille singing competition, Ernst Haefliger singing competition.
