= Hanna Ekola =

Finnish singer and songwriter (born 1961)

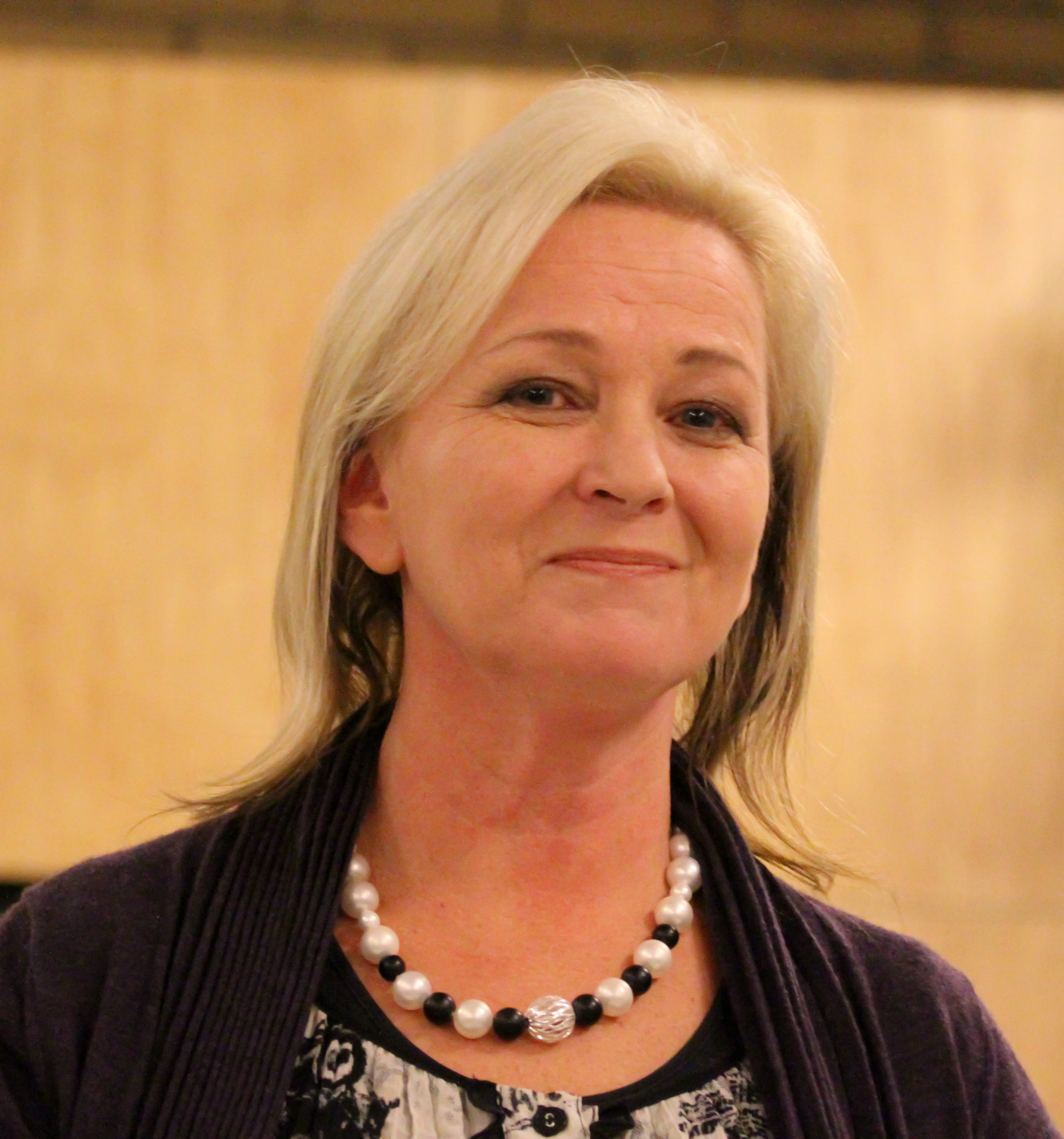
- Ekola in 2010

Background information
- Born: 9 November 1961 (age 63); Kiikka, Finland
- Genres: Schlager; gospel
- Occupations: Singer; songwriter; writer
- Years active: 1990–present

Hanna Ekola-Salonen (née Heikkilä; born 9 November 1961) is a Finnish singer, songwriter and author, known for her 1990 hit "Villihevosia" composed by her brother Martti Heikkilä, and for her distinctive voice.

== Early life ==
Ekola was born in Kiikka on 9 November 1961. Her elder sister was singer and songwriter Saara Suvanto.

== Musical career ==
Ekola has performed both light and spiritual music and written Christian literature. She performed with her husband Lido Salonen (1950–2008) and Virpi Salonen (Lahti). Ekola has continued to perform mainly in churches with Salonen even after her husband's death.

Ekola is a theologian by training. She has served as editor-in-chief of Finland's oldest Christian children's magazine, Vinki. Since childhood, she has written songs with Martti Heikkilä and their sister Saara Suvanto, and some of the songs have ended up on solo albums, for example, the song "Huomisaamun aikaa" written by Heikkilä and Ekola can be found on Ekola's debut album. Ekola also collaborates with other songwriters, such as Kai Jämsä; some of the songs written by Jämsä and Ekola have ended up on other artists. Ekola composed and wrote some of the songs on the album Luonnonlapset herself.

Ekola's hit "Villihevosia" was the most played radio song of 1991, and the album sold gold and platinum records. It was declared the most annoying hit in a Yle poll in 2015. In 2011, the Päijät-Häme District Court heard a case in which a man accused of aggravated assault had stabbed another man who had sung Ekola's song "Villihevosia".

Ekola has received several gold records and one platinum record for her albums and was awarded the Emma-gaala for New Female Soloist of the Year in 1991. She has written 28 Christian books and was awarded the Most Interesting Christian Book of the Year award in 1997.

Ekola is also an entrepreneur. She was granted an artist's pension in the beginning of 2022.

== Personal life ==
Ekola is a widow. Her husband was Juha "Lido" Salonen and Ekola has a son born in 1998. Salonen died of cancer in 2008. Ekola has since found a new man and lives in Pusula.

== Discography ==
=== Studio albums ===
- Hanna Ekola (Sonet, 1990)
- Joutsentanssi (Polygram, 1992)
- Luonnonlapset (Polygram, 1994)
- Sateenkaari (Columbia, 1996)
- Kiitos elämän lahjasta (Columbia, 1997)
- Joulunaika (Columbia, 1998)
- Enkelin siipien havinaa (Columbia, 2000)
- Et ole yksin (Sley-kirjat, 2003)
- Lupaus (2006)
- Aurinkotie (AXR Music, 2011)

=== Compilation albums ===
- Villihevosia – 20 Hannan parasta (1995)
- Villihevosia - 40 unohtumatonta laulua (2008)

=== Singles ===
- Hento (2004)
- Pelkää sydän maailmaa (2004)
- Huomisen murheet (2007)
- Kaipaus (2009)
- Helmi (2010)
- Joki vai silta (2013)
- Nuorgam (2013)
- Leskenlehti (2016)
