= Eerik Haamer =

Estonian painter

Eerik Haamer (17 February 1908 – 4 November 1994) was an Estonian painter.

He was born in Kuressaare. In 1935 he graduated from Pallas Art School. From 1941 to 1944, he taught at the Tallinn Applied Art School (Estonian: Tallinna Rakenduskunsti Kool). In 1944 he fled to Sweden. From 1955 onward, he was a freelance artist.

He is known for his epic paintings depicting the life of people living on the seashore, or relationships between man and nature, or between man and society.
