= Erki =

Erki may refer to:

- Estonian Academy of Arts (Eesti Riiklik Kunstiinstituut)
- Erki (given name), Estonian male given name
- an alternative spelling of Irkay, Lebanon
