= Erkki Virtanen =

Finnish politician

Erkki Alvar Virtanen (born 15 August 1952 in Jämsänkoski) is a Finnish politician and member of Finnish Parliament, representing the Left Alliance. He was elected to the Finnish Parliament in the 2003 election.
