= Mika Erkkilä =

Finnish ice hockey player

- Born: 4 March 1990 (age 35); Hämeenlinna, Finland
- Height: 5 ft 10 in (178 cm)
- Weight: 180 lb (82 kg; 12 st 12 lb)
- Position: Forward
- Shoots: Left
- SM-liiga team: HPK
- Playing career: 2011–present

Mika Erkkilä (born 4 March 1990) is a Finnish professional ice hockey player who played with HPK in the SM-liiga during the 2010–11 season.

== See also ==
- Ice hockey in Finland
