= Eerik =

Estonian and Finnish male given name

- Gender: Male
- Languages: Estonian, Finnish
- Name day: 18 May

Origin
- Region of origin: Estonia, Finland

Other names
- Related names: Erik, Erki, Erkki, Eero

Eerik is a masculine given name most commonly found in Estonia and Finland. It is a cognate of the English language name Eric. Men and boys named Eerik celebrate name day in Finland and Estonia on 18 May.

Eerik may refer to:

- Eerik Aps (born 1987), Estonian wrestler
- Eerik Haamer (1908–1994), Estonian painter
- Eerik Idarand (born 1991), Estonian speed skater
- Eerik Jago (born 1980), Estonian volleyball player
- Eerik Kantola (born 2000), Finnish football player
- Eerik Kumari (1912–1984), Estonian biologist, ornithologist and nature conservationist
- Eerik-Niiles Kross (born 1967), Estonian diplomat, intelligence chief, entrepreneur and politician
- Eerik Marmei (born 1970), Estonian diplomat
- Eerik Siikasaari (born 1957), Finnish jazz bassist, member of Trio Töykeät
- Eerik-Juhan Truuväli (1938–2019), Estonian lawyer, professor and politician
- Paul-Eerik Rummo (born 1942), Estonian poet, playwright, translator and politician

== Other ==
- Eerik Kumari Award, an award given to those who have excelled in bioscience in Estonia since 1989
