= Erkki Bahovski =

Estonian journalist and press officer

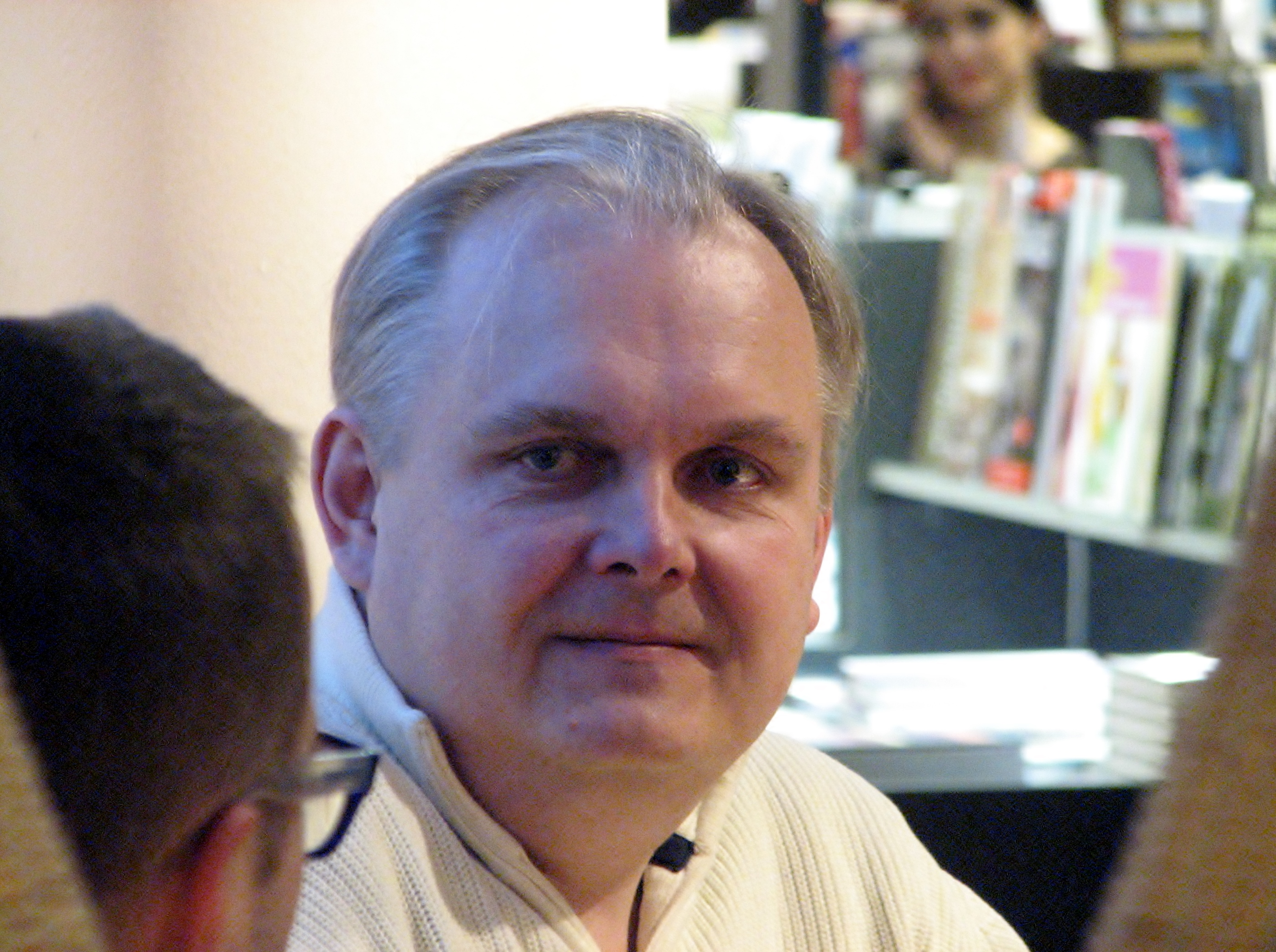
Erkki Bahovski

Erkki Bahovski (born 22 April 1970) is an Estonian journalist and press officer.

== Career ==
Bahovski worked for Postimees, the largest newspaper in Estonia, from 1995 until 2008. After that, he became the European Commission Representation's press officer for Estonia until 2011.
