= Erkki Rapo =

Erkki Rapo (July 2, 1946 – February 28, 2004) was a Finnish autograph collector.
