= Erkki Aadli =

Estonian orienteer (born 1974)

Erkki Aadli (born 26 March 1974) is an Estonian orienteer who won eight gold medals, nine silver medals, and eight bronze medals at the Estonian Orienteering Championship for Foot orienteering from 1996 to 2014.

== Education ==
Aadli graduated from Saue Gymnasium in 1992. He graduated from the Tallinn University of Technology in 1997 with a degree in construction.

== Work ==
Aadli works as a project manager for the constructor company Parmeron AS.

== Sports career ==
From 1996 to 2014 Aadli won eight gold medals, nine silver medals, and eight bronze medals at the Estonian Orienteering Championship for Foot orienteering.
