= Eero Väre =

Finnish ice hockey player

- Born: 20 December 1984 (age 41) Savonlinna, Finland
- Height: 5 ft 9 in (175 cm)
- Weight: 172 lb (78 kg; 12 st 4 lb)
- Position: Goaltender
- Catches: Right
- SM-liiga team: SaiPa
- Playing career: 2004–present

Eero Väre (born 20 December 1984) is a Finnish professional ice hockey goaltender who played with SaiPa in the SM-liiga during the 2010–11 season.
