= Humppa =

Type of music from Finland

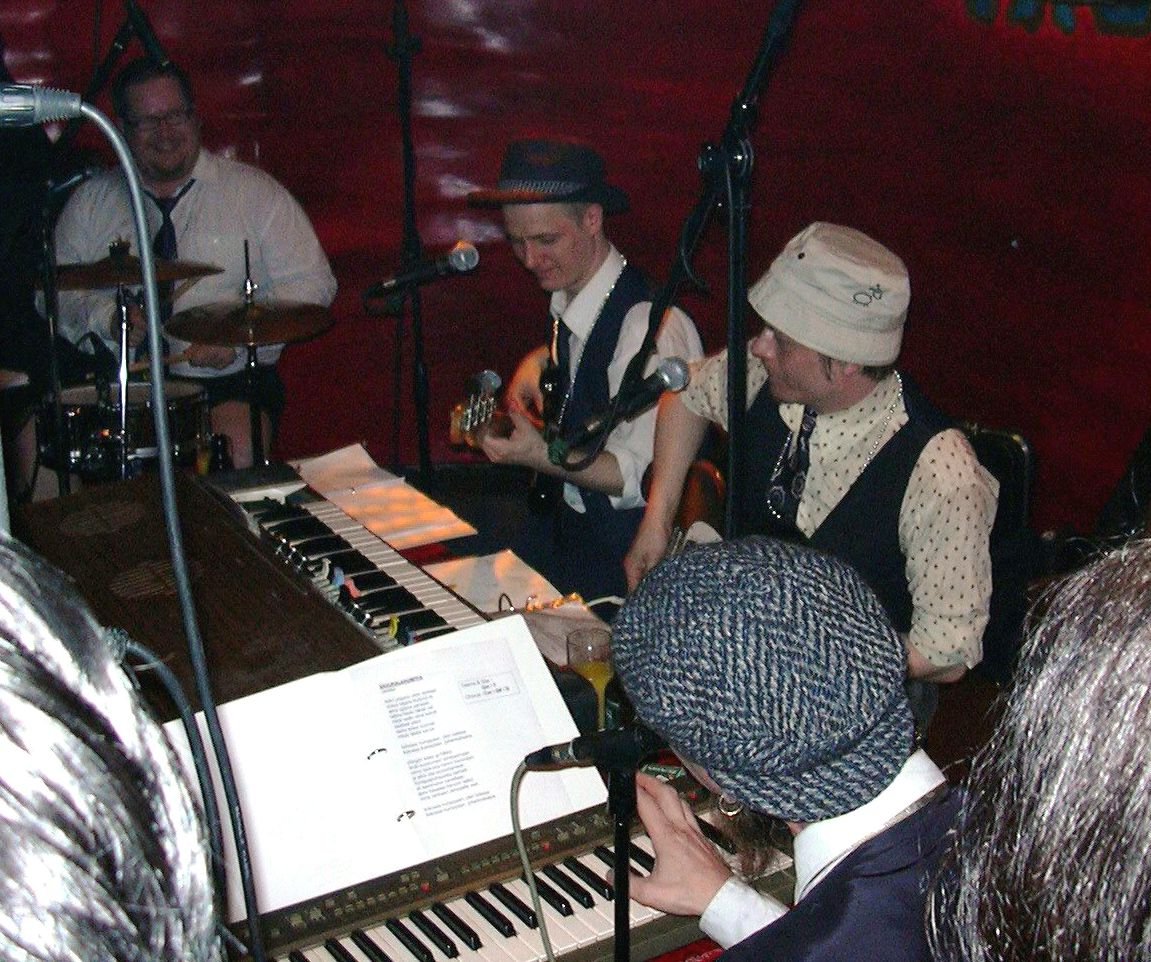
Finnish humppa band Eläkeläiset on stage

Humppa is a type of music from Finland. It is related to jazz and fast foxtrot, played two beats to a bar (2/4 or 2/2) at around 110 to 130 beats per minute. Humppa is also the name of a few social dances done to humppa music. All dances involve a bounce that follows the strong bass. In Finnish, the word humppa can be used for social dancing. The name humppa was invented by Antero Alpola for a radio show in the 1950s. He picked it up from German Oktoberfest where the locals used the word oompah to describe the music. The band probably used a tuba, as the sound of tuba on the first beat is like hump, the second beat coming as a pa.

== Dances ==
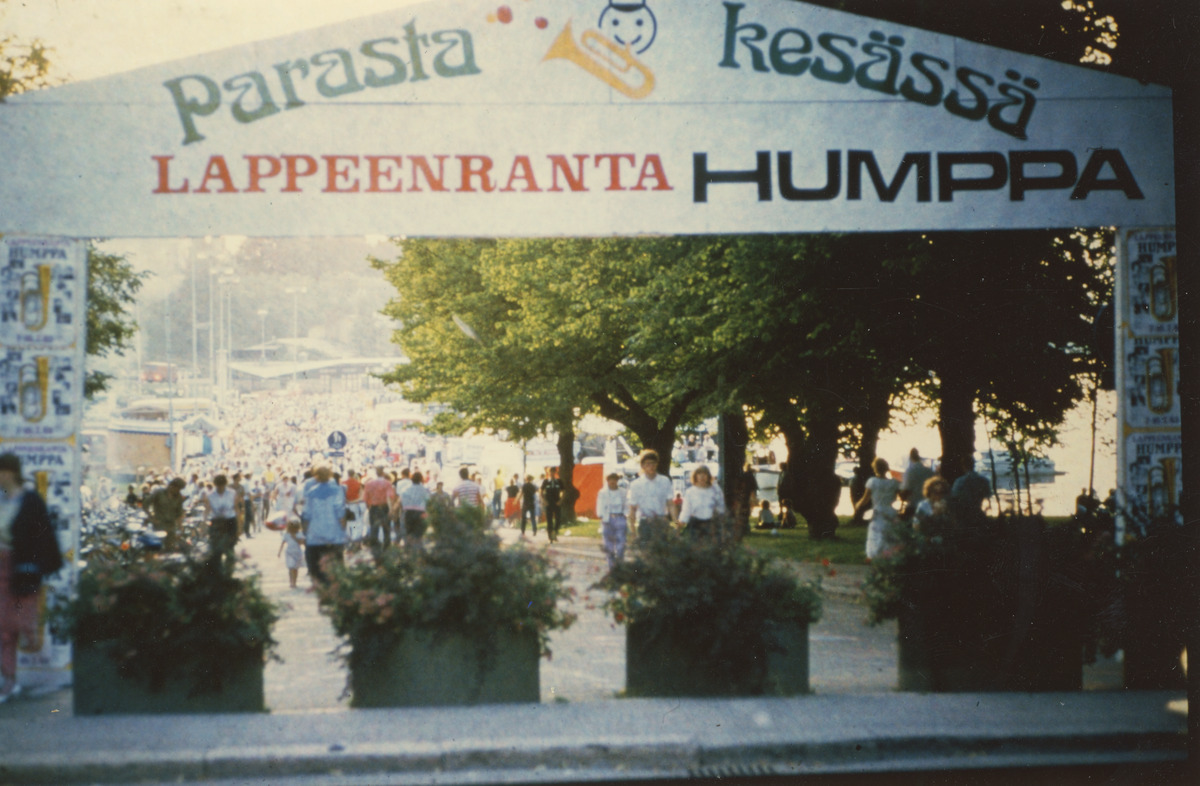
Humppa music festival held between 1977–1988 in Lappeenranta

Three different dances are typically danced to humppa music. They existed long before the word "humppa" was coined. One form of Humppa dance is related to one-step, which arrived in Finland 1913. In this kind of humppa, both dancers take a step on each first beat (on "hump") and progress to the direction of dance. This is danced making turns in closed position or making figures by changing various open positions.

The second Humppa form is related to two-step, which came to Finland in 1910. This Humppa has some rhythm and movement from samba and waltz. A third form of dance, Nilkku, is based on a slow, slow, quick, quick rhythm. The first quick step hardly takes any weight and gives the dance an appearance of limping.

In the early 1970s, pop music and dancing almost killed social dancing, but the revival of humppa keeps traditional social dancing alive. The revival meant that humppa had become the most popular music and dancing form for older people and for the countryside's youth in the Eastern and South-Eastern parts of the country. Popular humppa artists from the 1970s include male singers Erkki Junkkarinen, Henry Theel, Mikko Järvinen, Eino Valtanen, Eero Aven, female singers Berit, Eija-Sinikka, Hanne and bands Tulipunaruusut, Kaisa & Kumppanit, and Mutkattomat. The most popular humppa festivals were in Lappeenranta.

== See also ==
- Eläkeläiset, a band making humppa covers of famous pop songs.
