= Nathan Monroe =

American academic and political scientist

- Born: Nathan W. Monroe
- Other name: Nate Monroe
- Education: University of California, Santa Barbara (BA); University of California, San Diego (MA, PhD)
- Occupations: Academic; political scientist
- Employer: University of California, Merced
- Website: www.nathanwmonroe.com

Nathan W. Monroe is an American academic and political scientist. He is a professor in the department of political science at the University of California, Merced, where he holds the Tony Coelho Endowed Chair Professor in Public Policy. His research focuses on political institutions in the United States, especially the United States Congress, with an emphasis on agenda-setting and the legislative process.

== Early life and education ==
Monroe attended the University of California, Santa Barbara (UCSB) earning his B.A. degree in 2000. He then pursued graduate study in political science at the University of California, San Diego (UCSD), earning his M.A. degree in 2002 and completing his Ph.D. degree in 2004. At UCSD, he worked with congressional scholars Gary W. Cox and Mathew McCubbins, whose theory of party-cartel agenda control in the United States Congress became an influence on his own research on legislative agenda-setting.

== Career ==
Monroe began his academic career as an assistant professor at Michigan State University from 2004 to 2007, followed by a year at the University of the Pacific. He joined the political science faculty at UC Merced in 2008, one of nineteen new professors hired by the university that year. He was later promoted to full professor and served as chair of the department of political science from 2013 to 2017.

In 2014, Monroe was named to the Tony Coelho Endowed Chair of Public Policy, an endowed chair established by former U.S. Representative and House Majority Whip Tony Coelho. He is also a research affiliate at the University of California Institute on Global Conflict and Cooperation (IGCC).

In 2021, Monroe helped establish and became the founding director of UC Merced's Center for Analytic Political Engagement (CAPE). The center is oriented toward civic education and political engagement in California's San Joaquin Valley, a region that has historically been underserved by political and civic institutions, and it draws on Monroe's research on the legislative process and his legislative-simulation teaching model. An associated undergraduate course housed at the center has students simulate a session of the California State Senate, with California political practitioners taking part as recurring guest speakers; he co-developed the simulation with U.S. representative Adam Gray.

== Media commentary ==
Monroe is a regular political commentator for state, local, and national news outlets, where he is cited for his expertise on legislative and electoral politics. He appears frequently on the Fresno television stations KMPH-TV (Fox 26) and KFSN-TV (ABC30), and has a recurring Fox 26 segment titled "Politics in Perspective" in which he analyzes current political developments.

== Research ==
Monroe studies legislative institutions, with much of his work centering on agenda-setting and the procedural advantages of the majority party in the United States Congress. A recurring theme is that control over what legislation reaches the floor—rather than control over how members vote—is a key source of party power in the House and Senate. His articles have appeared in journals including the American Journal of Political Science, The Journal of Politics, the British Journal of Political Science, Political Research Quarterly, and the Journal of Law, Economics, and Organization.

Alongside his work on majority-party agenda control, Monroe has written on the measurement of agenda-setting power, the conditions under which the minority party can exert influence in Congress, and the formal-theoretic foundations of legislative models such as pivotal politics. He has also extended the study of legislative procedure beyond the U.S. Congress: with Courtenay Conrad he has examined agenda-setting in the United Nations General Assembly, research supported by a grant from the National Science Foundation. His earlier and adjacent work spans state legislatures—including studies of term limits and incumbency in the California State Legislature—and election administration, such as field-experimental research on vote-by-mail.

Monroe is the author or editor of three books. Why Not Parties? Party Effects in the United States Senate (2008), co-edited with Jason R. Roberts and David W. Rohde, was published by the University of Chicago Press. Agenda Setting in the U.S. Senate: Costly Consideration and Majority Party Advantage (2011), with Chris Den Hartog, was published by Cambridge University Press. The Jeffords Switch: Changing Majority Status and Causal Processes in the U.S. Senate (2019), also with Den Hartog, was published by the University of Michigan Press.

== Awards and honors ==
Monroe received the CQ Press Award for the best paper on legislative studies presented at the 2013 meeting of the American Political Science Association. His research on legislative procedure in the United Nations General Assembly, conducted with Courtenay Conrad, was funded by a National Science Foundation grant. As a doctoral student, he received the Peggy Quon Prize at UCSD.

== Personal life ==
According to a 2011 public comment, Monroe is a resident of Hughson in Stanislaus County, California.

== Selected publications ==
Books

- Den Hartog, Chris; Monroe, Nathan W. (2019). The Jeffords Switch: Changing Majority Status and Causal Processes in the U.S. Senate. Ann Arbor, MI: University of Michigan Press.
- Den Hartog, Chris; Monroe, Nathan W. (2011). Agenda Setting in the U.S. Senate: Costly Consideration and Majority Party Advantage. New York, NY: Cambridge University Press.
- Monroe, Nathan W.; Roberts, Jason R.; Rohde, David W. (2008). Why Not Parties? Party Effects in the United States Senate. Chicago, IL: University of Chicago Press.
