= Forming =

Forming may refer to:

- "Forming" (song), a song by the Germs
- Forming (metalworking), a metalworking process where a workpiece is reshaped without adding or removing material
  - Cold forming or cold working
  - Roll forming

== See also ==
- Vacuum forming
- Thermoforming
- Form (disambiguation)
- Formation (disambiguation)
