= Form =

Form is the shape, visual appearance, or configuration of an object. In a wider sense, the form is the way something happens.

Form may also refer to:

- Form (document), a document (printed or electronic) with spaces in which to write or enter data
- Form (architecture), a combination of external appearance, internal structure, and the unity of the design
- Form (education), a class, set, or group of students
- Form (religion), an academic term for prescriptions or norms on religious practice
- Form, a shallow depression or flattened nest of grass used by a hare
- Form, or rap sheet, slang for a criminal record

== People ==
- Andrew Form, American film producer
- Fluent Form, Australian rapper and hip hop musician

== Arts, entertainment, and media ==
- Form (arts organisation), a Western Australian arts organisation
- Form (visual art), a three-dimensional geometrical figure; one of the seven elements of art
- Poetic form, a set of structural rules and patterns to which a poem may adhere
- Musical form, a generic type of composition or the structure of a particular piece
- The Forms (band), an American indie rock band
- Form, 2010 album from Die! Die! Die!

== Computing and technology ==
- Form (computer virus), the most common computer virus of the 1990s
- Form (HTML), a document form used on a web page to, typically, submit user data to a server
- Form (programming), a component-based representation of a GUI window
- FORM (symbolic manipulation system), a program for symbolic computations
- Google Forms, cloud-based survey software
- Oracle Forms, a Rapid Application Development environment for developing database applications
- Windows Forms, the graphical API within the Microsoft .NET Framework for access to native Microsoft Windows interface elements
- XForms, an XML format for the specification of user interfaces, specifically web forms
- Form Energy, an American energy storage startup company

== Martial arts ==
- Kata (型 or 形), the detailed pattern of defence-and-attack
- Taeguk (Taekwondo) (형), the "forms" used to create a foundation for the teaching of Taekwondo
- Taolu (套路), forms used in Chinese martial arts and sport wushu

== Mathematics ==
- Algebraic form (homogeneous polynomial), which generalises quadratic forms to degrees 3 and more, also known as quantics or simply forms
- Bilinear form, on a vector space V over a field F is a mapping V × V → F that is linear in both arguments
- Differential form, a concept from differential topology that combines multilinear forms and smooth functions
- First-order reliability method, a semi-probabilistic reliability analysis method devised to evaluate the reliability of a system
- Indeterminate form, an algebraic expression that cannot be used to evaluate a limit
- Modular form, a (complex) analytic function on the upper half plane satisfying a certain kind of functional equation and growth condition
- Multilinear form, which generalises bilinear forms to mappings V^{N} → F
- Quadratic form, a homogeneous polynomial of degree two in a number of variables
- Sesquilinear form, a generalisation of bilinear forms, especially on complex vector spaces (Hermitian forms)

== Philosophy ==
- Argument form, a.k.a. Logical form or Test form - replacing the different words, or sentences, that make up the argument with letters, along the lines of algebra; the letters represent logical variables
- Intelligible form, a substantial form as it is apprehended by the intellect
- Substantial form, asserts that ideas organize matter and make it intelligible
- Theory of forms, asserts that ideas possess the highest and most fundamental kind of reality
- Value-form, an approach to understanding the origins of commodity trade and the formation of markets

== Science ==
- Form (botany), a formal taxon at a rank lower than species
- Form (zoology), informal taxa used sometimes in zoology
- Form, object of study of Morphology
- "-form", a term used in science to describe large groups, often used in taxonomy
- Isoform, several different forms of the same protein

== Sports ==
- Form (exercise), a proper way of performing an exercise
- Form (horse racing), or racing form, a record of a racehorse's performance
- Kata, a choreographed pattern of martial arts movements made to be practised alone

== Other uses ==
- Form (cigarette), a Finnish cigarette brand
- Form, a backless bench formerly used for seating in dining halls, school rooms and courtrooms
- Form, the relation a word has to a lexeme
- Formwork, a mold used for concrete construction

== See also ==
- FORM (disambiguation)
- Conformity (disambiguation)
- Deformation (disambiguation)
- Form factor (disambiguation)
- Formal (disambiguation)
- Formalism (disambiguation)
- Formation (disambiguation)
- Forme (disambiguation)
- Formula (disambiguation)
- Inform (disambiguation)
- Reform (disambiguation)
