= Conformation =

Conformation generally means structural arrangement and may refer to:

- Conformational isomerism, a form of stereoisomerism in chemistry
  - Carbohydrate conformation
  - Cyclohexane conformation
  - Protein conformation
  - Conformation activity relationship between the biological activity and the conformation or conformational changes of a biomolecule

== Animal breeding ==
- Equine conformation evaluates the degree of correctness of a horse's bone structure, musculature, and body proportions
- Conformation (dog) evaluates a dog according to physical standards for its breed
  - Conformation show, a dog show in which dogs are judged according to how well they conform to the established breed type

== See also ==
- Conformable
- Conformal (disambiguation)
- Conformality
- Conformance (disambiguation)
- Conformer
- Confirmation
- Conformity
