= Forme (disambiguation) =

Forme is a chase with type locked up ready for printing

Forme may also refer to:

- Forme, Škofja Loka, a settlement in Slovenia
- Forme Tour, a professional golf tour

== See also ==
- Form (disambiguation)
- FORM (disambiguation)
