= Formal =

Formal, formality, informal or informality imply the complying with, or not complying with, some set of requirements (forms, in Ancient Greek). They may refer to:

== Dress code and events ==
- Formal wear, attire for formal events
- Semi-formal attire, attire for semi-formal events
- Informal attire, more controlled attire than casual but less than formal
- Formal (university), official university dinner, ball or other event
- School formal, official school dinner, ball or other event

== Logic and mathematics ==
- Formal logic, or symbolic logic
  - Informal logic, the complement, whose definition and scope is contentious
- Formal fallacy, reasoning of invalid structure
  - Informal fallacy, the complement
- Informal mathematics, also called naïve mathematics
- Formal cause, Aristotle's intrinsic, determining cause
- Formal power series, a generalization of power series without requiring convergence, used in combinatorics
- Formal calculation, a calculation which is systematic, but without a rigorous justification
- Formal set theory, as opposed to Naive set theory
- Formal derivative, an operation on elements of a polynomial ring which mimics the form of the derivative from calculus

== Computer science ==
- Formal methods, mathematically based techniques for the specification, development and verification of software and hardware systems
- Formal specification, describes what a system should do, not how it should do it
- Formal verification, proves correctness of a system

== Linguistics ==
- Formal system, an abstract means of generating inferences in a formal language
- Formal language, comprising the symbolic "words" or "sentences" of a formal system
- Formal grammar, a grammar describing a formal language
- Colloquialism, the linguistic style used for informal communication
- T–V distinction, involving a distinction between formal and informal words for "you"
- Formal proof, a fully rigorous proof as is possible only in a formal system
- Dynamic and formal equivalence word-for-word translation, especially of the Bible

== Chemistry ==
- Formal concentration, molar concentration of original chemical formula in solution
- Formal (pronounced "form-al")
  - A compound CH_{2}(OR)_{2}, named in analogy to acetals CHR^{1}(OR)_{2} (historical definition) and ketals CR^{1}R^{2}(OR)_{2}
  - Dimethoxymethane (CH_{2}(OCH_{3})_{2}) in particular, the formal derived from methanol

== Social regulation ==
- A formality, an established procedure or set of specific behaviors
  - Pro forma, for no purpose other than satisfying a formality
- Informal activities:
  - Informal education, education outside of a standard school setting
  - Informal sector, the part of an economy that is not taxed, nor monitored by any form of government
  - Informal settlement, or shanty town
  - Informal value transfer system, outside the conventional banking system
  - Informal social control, enforcing norms without resort to laws

== Other ==
- Informal vote, a spoiled, void, null vote cast in an election
- MV Formality, coaster (formerly Empire Favourite) owned by F T Everard & Sons, scrapped in 1962

== See also ==
- Form (disambiguation)
- Formalism (disambiguation)
- Formal theory (disambiguation)
