= Thomas E. Stanley =

American architect

Thomas Edward Stanley II (May 1, 1917 in North Carolina – January 23, 2001 in Dallas, Texas) was a Dallas-based American architect. He is known for his modernist glass and steel designs for buildings such as 211 North Ervay (1958) with architect Wyatt C. Hedrick and the First National Bank Tower (1965) with architect George Dahl. He is also known for his use of minimalist classical designs (often called New Formalism) for buildings such as the Sanger-Harris department store (1965) in Dallas, Texas and the Cambridge Tower (1965) in Austin, Texas.

== List of works ==
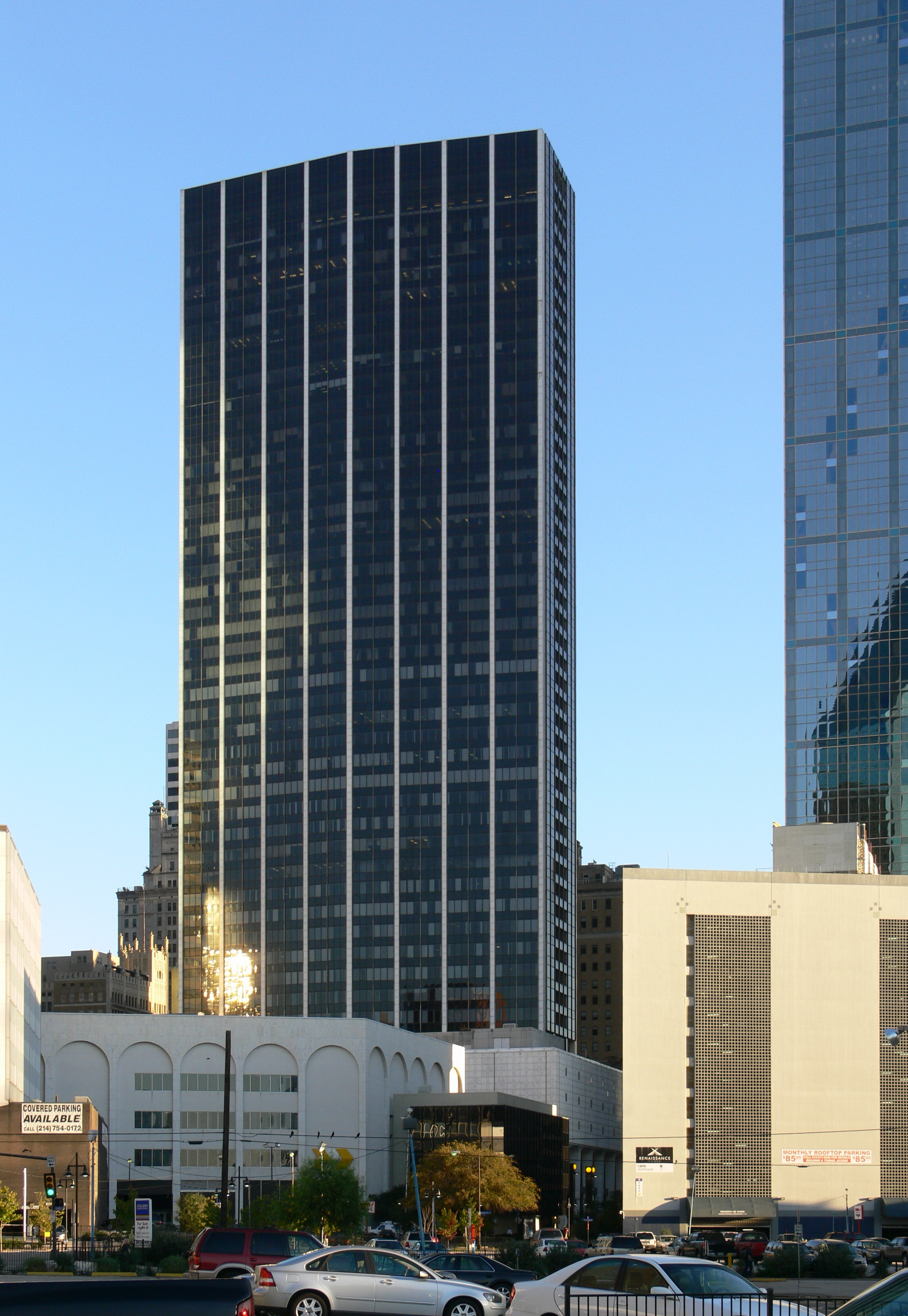
First National Bank Tower, Dallas (1958)

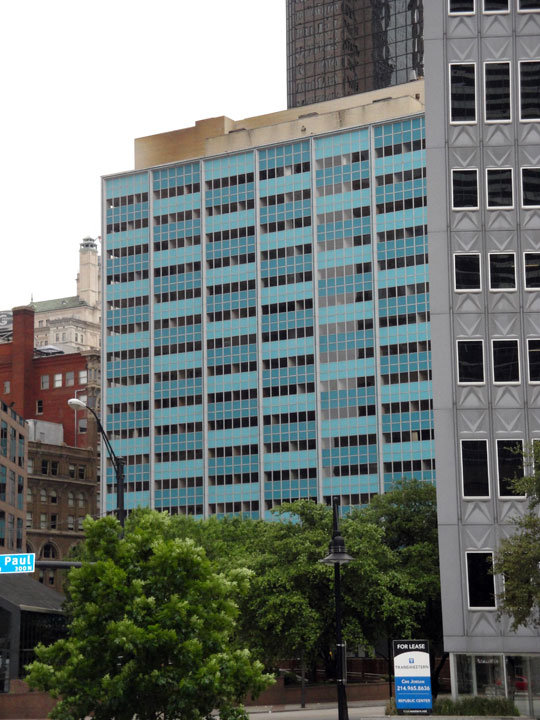
211 North Ervay, Dallas (1958)

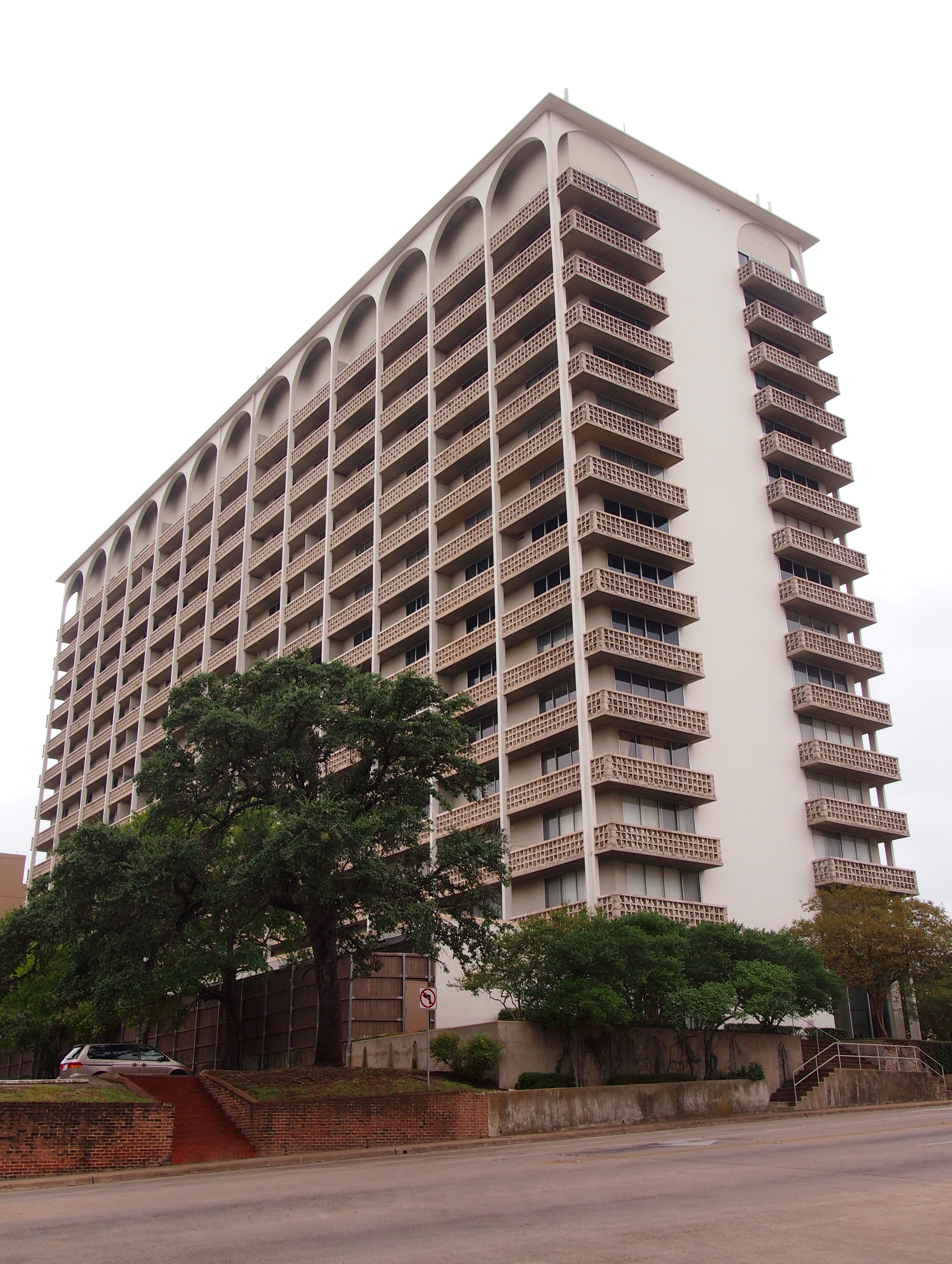
Cambridge Tower, Austin (1965)

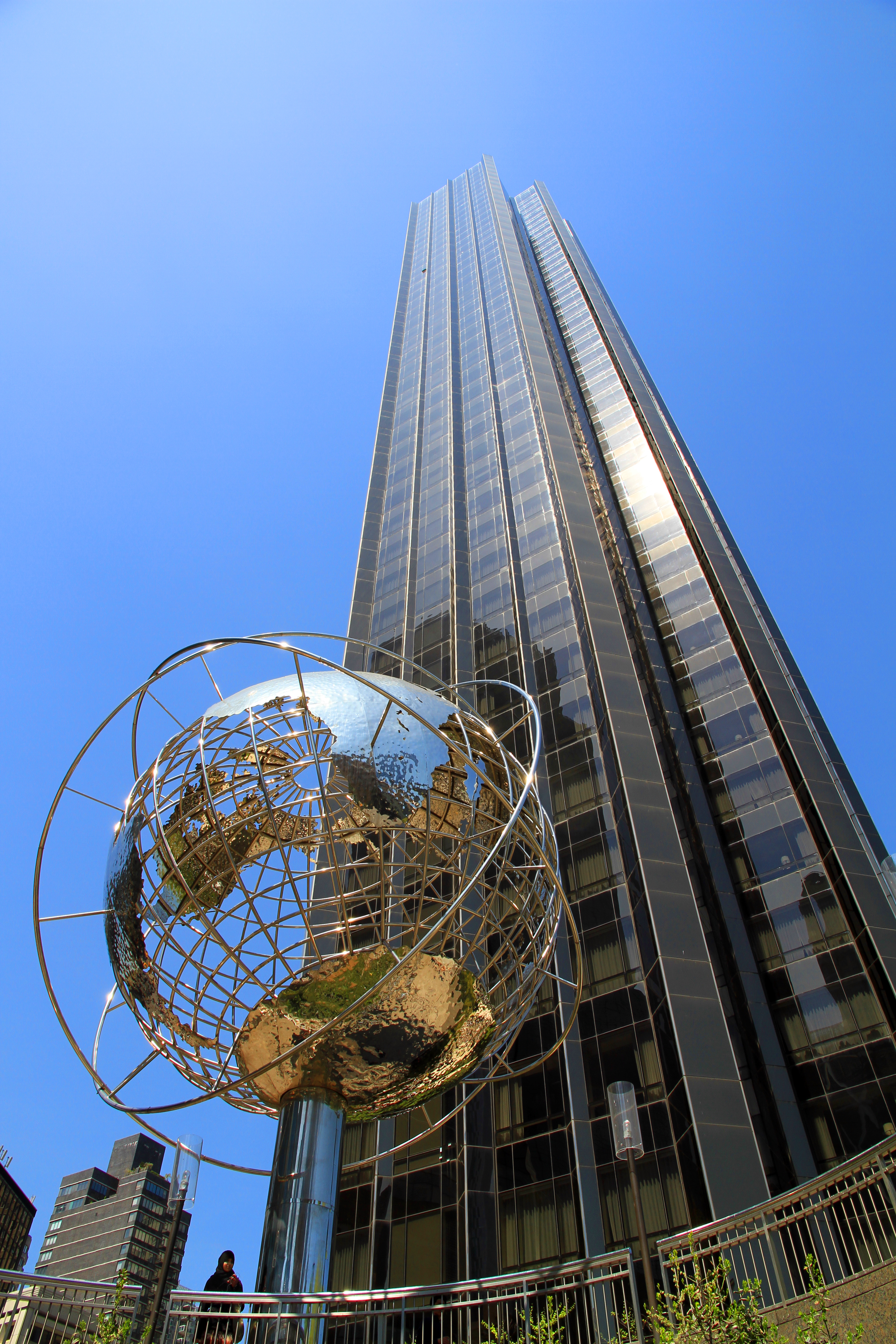
Gulf and Western Building, NYC (1969)

With Wyatt C. Hedrick

- 1948, W.A. Taylor Company office and warehouse, Dallas, Texas (as Hedrick, Stanley and Morey)
- 1950–1963, Tarleton State College, Stephenville, Texas
- 1952, Corrigan Tower, Dallas
- 1952, Fidelity Union Life Insurance Building, Dallas
- 1954, Vaughn Building, Dallas
- 1956, First National Bank and First National Auto Bank, Waco
- 1956, Shady Oak Country Club building, Westworth, Texas
- 1957, Mr. and Mrs. Lee Armer residence, Fort Worth
- 1957, Armour Plant, Additions and Alterations, Portland, Oregon
- 1957, Central Christian Church, Church building, Fort Worth
- 1957, Colorado and Southern Railway Company, freight and passenger depot, Boulder, Colorado
- 1957, Gatesville School for Boys. Chapel, Gatesville, Texas
- 1957, H. and N.T. Motor and Freight Lines Inc. office and terminal building, Dallas
- 1957, Dr. and Mrs. A.W. Hiller residence, Fort Worth
- 1957, Jackson Chevrolet Co. sales and service buildings, Garland, Texas
- 1957, Texas and Pacific terminal warehouse, Relocation of cooling towers, Fort Worth
- 1957, Municipal Buildings, Gainesville, Texas
- 1957, Mr. Elmer Perkins residence, Additions and alterations, Wichtia Falls, Texas
- 1957, Plumbers and Steamfitters Local #1 union headquarters, Dallas
- 1957, Sudan I.S.D. Homemaking building, Sudan, Texas
- 1957, Tarrant County Youth Center, Fort Worth
- 1957, Texas Highway Dept. district headquarters buildings, Paris, Texas (as Hedrick, Stanley & Morey)
- 1958, 211 North Ervay Building, Dallas
- 1958, Dr. Platt Allen medical clinic, Weatherford, Texas
- 1958, Casa Del Club, Ciudad Bolívar, Venezuela
- 1958, Anson General Hospital, Additions, Anson, Texas
- 1958, Fort Worth and Denver City Railroad, Mechanical building, Fort Worth
- 1958, Lewter Corp. cooling building and slaughtering facilities, Lubbock, Texas
- 1958, Jay's Supermarket, Gallup, New Mexico
- 1958, Methodist Student Center building, Stephenville, Texas
- 1958, Shippers Warehouse Co. warehouse and office, Dallas
- 1958, Sol Dey Rey Farms (as Hedrick, Stanley and Lightfoot)
- 1958, Texas National Guard, One unit armory, Weatherford, Texas
- 1958, Trinity Methodist Church Sanctuary, Fort Worth
- 1959, Bank of Georgia Building, Atlanta, Georgia
- 1959, Curtis Building – Akard St and Cedar Springs Rd, Dallas
- 1959, Drilcheck Corp. office building, Additions and alterations, Dallas
- 1959, Midwestern Baptist Theological Seminary dormitory building and married couples apartments, Kansas City, Missouri
- 1959, Elementary school building, Wilmer, Texas
- 1964, Federal Office Building, Fort Worth (as Hedrick Stanley and Wilson)
- Adolphus Tower, Dallas

With George Dahl

- 1962–1965, First National Bank Tower, Dallas

As Thomas E. Stanley and Associates

- 1962, El Tropicano Hotel, San Antonio
- 1962, Oak Park Plaza Building, Welborn St. and Rawlins St., Dallas
- 1962, Phoenix Title and Trust Building (Transamerica Office Building), Tucson, Arizona
- 1963, Dallas North Regional Shopping Center
- 1963, 1125 Grand Boulevard, Kansas City, Missouri
- 1964, One Lee Park West, Dallas
- 1965, Sanger-Harris department store
- 1965, Cambridge Tower, Austin
- 1965, Mayflower Building
- 1965, Noel Page Building, Dallas
- 1965, Shaw-Walker Building, Dallas
- 1966, Bank of Dallas, Lemmon Street, Dallas
- 1967, Malta Hilton Hotel, Malta
- 1968, Carr P. Collins Center at Baylor University Medical Center
- 1968, West Park Shopping Center, Lubbock
- 1969, Gulf and Western Building
- 1969, Union National Bank of Little Rock
- 1970, Indiana National Bank, Indianapolis
- 1970, Gulf and Western Building, New York City
- 1970, Midland Building, Columbus, Ohio
- 1970, Lover's Lane United Methodist Church, Dallas
- 1971, 3131 Turtle Creek Building, Dallas
- 1971, Liberty, the Bank of Mid-America, Oklahoma City
- 1975, 30 North LaSalle, Chicago
- renovation of Cotton Exchange Building, Dallas
- Shady Oaks Country Club, Fort Worth
- office building, San Jose
- office building, El Paso
- office building, Phoenix
- First National Bank of Omaha
- Bank of Commerce, Abilene
- First National-Pioneer Building, Lubbock
