= Formation =

Formation may refer to:

== Linguistics ==
- Back-formation, the process of creating a new lexeme by removing or affixes
- Word formation, the creation of a new word by adding affixes

== Mathematics and science ==
- Cave formation or speleothem, a secondary mineral deposit formed in a cave
- Class formation, a topological group acting on a module satisfying certain conditions
- Formation (group theory), a class of groups that is closed under some operations
- Formation constant, an equilibrium constant for the formation of a complex in solution
- Formation enthalpy, standard heat of formation of a compound
- Formation (geology), a formally named rock stratum or geological unit
- Formation of rocks, how rocks are formed
- Formation and evolution of the Solar System, history of the Solar System
- Rock formation, an isolated, scenic, or spectacular surface rock outcrop
- Vegetation formation, a concept used to classify vegetation communities

== Technology ==
- Formation level, the native material underneath a constructed road, pavement or railway
- Formation (Li-ion battery), a process step in the manufacture of Li-ion batteries necessary for long cell life
- Formation water, water that is produced as a byproduct during oil and gas production

== Military ==
- Formation flying, the disciplined flight of two or more aircraft under the command of a flight leader
- Formation (military), a high-level military organization
- Tactical formation, the arrangement or deployment of moving military forces
- Formation, an element in order of battle as a formal assembly of military personnel usually to receive the course of actions (operation order) or get deployed to operations
  - Formation may be tactical or ceremonial

== Music ==
- Formation Records, a record label headed by DJ SS
- "Formation" (song), a song by American singer Beyoncé on her 2016 album Lemonade
- The Formation World Tour, concert tour by Beyoncé for her album Lemonade
- Formation (Adekunle Gold song)

== Religion ==
- Formations or saṅkhāra, an important Buddhist concept
- Formation in the Catholic Church, the personal preparation that the Catholic Church offers to people with a defined mission

== Sports ==
- Formation (association football), how team players are positioned on the pitch
- Formation (American football), the positions in which players line up before the start of a down
- Formation (bandy), how the players are positioned on the rink
- Formation dance, a style of ballroom dancing
- Formation finish, a staged motor-race finish in which multiple vehicles of the same team cross the finish line together

== Writing ==
- Formation (book), a bildungsroman by Brad Mehldau

== Other ==
- Contract formation in law; an offer, acceptance, consideration, and a mutual intent to be bound
- Formation 8, an American venture capital firm in San Francisco, California
- Formation of a coalition government, led by a formateur
- Government formation in a parliamentary system
- Formations, imprint of Ohio State University Press

== See also ==
- 4mations, defunct video hosting website
- Form (disambiguation)
