= Formalism =

Formalism may refer to:

- Legal formalism, legal positivist view that the substantive justice of a law is a question for the legislature rather than the judiciary
- Formalism (linguistics)
- Scientific formalism
- A rough synonym to the Formal system, a mathematical model for deduction or proof systems.
- A given style of notation.
- Formalism (Yarvin), relating to Curtis Yarvin's ideas within the Dark Enlightenment
- Formalism (philosophy), that there is no transcendent meaning to a discipline other than the literal content created by a practitioner
  - Religious formalism, an emphasis on the ritual and observance of religion, rather than its meaning.
  - Formalism (philosophy of mathematics), or mathematical formalism, that statements of mathematics and logic can be thought of as statements about the consequences of certain string manipulation rules.
  - Formalism (art), that a work's artistic value is entirely determined by its form
    - Formalism (music)
    - Formalist film theory, focused on the formal, or technical, elements of a film
    - Formalism (literature)
      - New Formalism, a late-20th century movement in American poetry – sometimes called simply "Formalism"
      - Russian formalism, school of literary criticism in Russia from the 1910s to the 1930s
    - New Formalism (architecture), a mid-20th century architectural style, sometimes abbreviated to Formalism

== See also ==
- Form (disambiguation)
- Formal (disambiguation)
