= Confirmation (disambiguation) =

Confirmation predominantly refers to a rite of passage, mostly (but not exclusively) Christian:

- Confirmation
  - Confirmation (Latter Day Saints)
  - Confirmation (Lutheran Church)
  - Confirmation (Roman Catholic Church)
  - Chrismation, or confirmation (Eastern Christianity)

Confirmation or confirm may also refer to:

== Arts and entertainment ==
- Confirmation (film), a 2016 television film about Anita Hill and Clarence Thomas
- The Confirmation, a 2016 Canadian film
- Confirmations (The Morning Show), an episode of the American television series The Morning Show
- "Confirmation" (composition), a 1945 jazz standard by Charlie Parker
- Confirmation (Barry Harris and Kenny Barron album), 1992
- Confirmation (Tommy Flanagan album), 1982
- "Confirmation", a 2020 song by Justin Bieber from the album Changes
- "Confirmation", a 2020 song by Westerman from the album Your Hero Is Not Dead

== Science and philosophy ==
- Confirmation, a part of the scientific method
- Confirmation holism, the claim that a single scientific theory cannot be tested in isolation
- Bayesian confirmation theory, a quantitative, as opposed to a qualitative, theory of confirmation
- Verificationism, adherence to the verification principle proposed by A. J. Ayer in Language, Truth and Logic

== Other uses ==
- Probate, known in Scotland as confirmation
- Senate confirmation, a process of confirming a presidential nominee by the United States Senate
- Tenure, at universities in Australia and New Zealand, referred to as confirmation

== See also ==
- Conformation (disambiguation)
- Conformity (disambiguation)
