= Bureaucratic drift =

Political science theory

In American political science, bureaucratic drift is a theory that seeks to explain the tendency for bureaucratic agencies to create policy that deviates from the original mandate. The difference between a bureaucracy's enactment of a law and the legislature's intent is called bureaucratic drift. Legislation is produced by elected officials, but is implemented by unelected bureaucrats, who sometimes act under their own preferences or interests. Bureaucratic drift is often treated as a principal–agent problem, with Congress and the Presidency acting as principals and bureaucracy acting as the agent. The government seeks to control bureaucratic drift in a number of ways, most notably congressional oversight and procedural controls.

== History ==
Mathew McCubbins, Roger Noll, and Barry Weingast first defined the theory of bureaucratic drift in 1987. They argued that drift is essentially a principal-agent problem that explores "how—or indeed, whether—elected political officials can reasonably effectively assure that their policy intentions will be carried out." The major tenets of the theory include how bureaucrats can manipulate policy when creating bureaucratic agencies and the argument that delay built into the bureaucracy is a good thing, because delay gives government a chance to perfect a policy over time.

In 1989, Murray Horn and Kenneth Shepsle proposed that coalitional drift, the phenomenon of present legislation being overwritten by the changing views of political coalitions, is a trade-off to bureaucratic drift. The relationship between bureaucratic and coalitional drift is a disputed part of the bureaucratic drift theory.

In 1992, Jonathan Macey hypothesized that the creation of an agency's structure and design is instrumental in preventing bureaucratic drift. Macey speculates that both current interest groups and Congress benefit from the careful structure and design of a bureaucratic agency. The former is pleased by policies that continue to reflect their preferences while the latter is pleased that both bureaucratic and coalitional drift are protected against. Contrary to Horn and Shepsle, Macey argues that coalitional drift and bureaucratic drift aren't necessarily opposing forces, but that the careful construction of an agency's structure and design can mitigate the costs of both types of drift. He also disagrees with McCubbins, Noll and Weingast on the power of delay to reduce bureaucratic drift, because extra time gives future interest groups and a future Congress the opportunity to insert their own preferences into the proposed policy. This is an example of coalitional and bureaucratic drift working counter to each other.

== Causes ==
Scholars have identified three major areas that contribute to bureaucratic drift: how bureaucracies are structured, interest groups that lobby bureaucracies, and presidential appointments of bureaucratic leaders.

=== Structural ===
Bureaucratic agencies are often structured so that legislators and their staffers have the opportunity to easily monitor bureaucratic activity. While some scholars believe that structural organization can help lessen bureaucratic drift, other scholars have found that this approach can backfire. When a bureaucracy is permeable anyone can access it, including legislators who were originally adverse to the legislation being implemented. Further, scholars argue that if a bureaucratic agency is designed to represent a single interest, its implementations are more likely to reflect the views of the people they are representing than they are the views of the legislature.

=== Lobbying ===
Making bureaucracies easily accessible means that interest groups can have a greater influence on the outcome of policy implementation. Some scholars believe that bureaucracies can have positive interactions with interest groups. An example of such an interaction is when interest groups support bureaucracies by providing information and facts about areas the bureaucracy is meant to promote or serve. Other scholars, however, have found that interest groups can cause bureaucratic drift. When a bureaucratic agency is infiltrated or corrupted by an external group whose views do not align with the preferences of the legislature it is said that the bureaucratic agency is captured. If an interest group negotiates with a bureaucracy, it can bias the bureaucracy to implement policy that drifts from the original intention of the legislation so the policy instead better serves the needs of the interest group.

=== Presidential appointments ===
Scholars consider presidents active in the affairs of "independent" bureaucracies. Presidential nominations are sometimes considered a check on bureaucracies because it ensures reliable agent performance. However, presidents can use appointments for political gain. A president may wish to maintain bureaucratic drift if it lies in his or her favor. An administrative agency can be captured by a president when he or she appoints a bureaucratic head that reaffirms bureaucratic drift that is favorable to the president's policies. In cases where bureaucratic drift is present, scholars believe that the president can change policy more rapidly than in a zero-drift scenario.

== Checks ==
=== Legislative checks ===
Through congressional acts, the legislative branch has the power to curb bureaucratic drift. Such regulation can take the form of statutory control or congressional oversight. Through statutory control, Congress aims to limit bureaucratic drift before it occurs by exerting influence over the organization of a bureaucracy. Congress exerts statutory control by specifying the bureaucracy's agenda, structure, time and fiscal constraints, and procedures while leaving little discretion to the bureaucracies. Oversight, on the other hand, occurs when Congress monitors the actions of bureaucracies and is used to check bureaucratic drift after agencies have acted on policies.

Mathew McCubbins and Thomas Schwartz have categorized oversight into two types- police patrol and fire alarm patrol. Police patrol refers to oversight when legislators instigate investigations into bureaucracies and actively search for bureaucratic drift. Such oversight may involve legislators monitoring agencies, reading reports, conducting field studies, and questioning officials. Unlike police patrol, Congress also uses fire-alarm patrol by constructing procedures that allow citizens and interest groups to alert legislators of drift. This method involves less action by congress, and McCubbins and Schwartz argue that it is preferred by legislators as it allows them to devote less time and resources to oversight. However, other scholars criticize fire-alarm patrol by arguing that citizens' complaints may never reach legislators and those that do may be deceitful, thus sounding "false alarms".

=== Judicial checks ===
Because of the Administrative Procedure Act, the judicial branch is able to check bureaucratic drift through judicial review. Scholars have argued that the judicial branch checks bureaucratic drift most efficiently when controlling delays of implementing law. Timing is important because the process gives less organized groups time to learn about proposed actions and respond to these proposals. The same scholars point out that ongoing delays caused by judicial review on agency actions may discourage less organized interest, because such groups lack the resources necessary to maintain an effective coalition over long periods of time. Other scholars argue that judicial review also allows less organized groups to hire lawyers to assist in monitoring agency actions.

=== Executive checks ===
The president has the power to check bureaucratic drift through executive orders and by choosing appointees for the highest post of bureaucracies. A president can attempt to affect drift by choosing appointees whose preferences closely resemble his or her own. Also cabinet officials have their own independent evaluation staffs in charge of ensuring that agencies do not drift from government decisions. Monitoring bureaucratic agencies is also possible through the Office of Management and Budget as well as the White House staff. Since Congress controls the amount of money appropriated to bureaucratic agencies, monitoring by the Office of Management and Budget is limited. The Office of Information and Regulatory Affairs, a division of the Office of Management and Budget, can delay agency regulations it deems unsatisfactory. Scholars argue that one problem of the executive branch working to reduce bureaucratic drift is that it wastes time and resources that could be spent serving constituents. Also other scholars point out that future coalitions may tamper with carefully negotiated bargains. Therefore executives often focus more on work they can immediately benefit from.

== Implications ==
While some scholars believe that delegation is a necessary part of the American government, and that bureaucratic drift is a risk that must be weighed when delegating implementation powers, others believe that delegation of power to bureaucracy is both unconstitutional and happens too frequently. These scholars subscribe to the Non-delegation Doctrine, and believe that the risk posed by bureaucratic drift is disruptive enough to American politics that delegation must be reconsidered or even eliminated.
