= Conformity (disambiguation) =

Conformity is the process by which an individual's attitudes, beliefs, and behaviors are influenced by other people.

Conformity may also refer to:

- Conformity: A Tale, a novel by Charlotte Elizabeth Tonna
- Conformity: The Power of Social Influences, a book by US legal scholar Cass Sunstein
- Conformity, the closeness of an individual dog to its breed's standard, judged in a conformation show

== See also ==
- Conformist (Church of England)
- Unconformity, a buried erosion surface or fault
- Asch conformity experiments
- Certificate of conformity, regarding a type approval
- Confirmation (disambiguation)
- Form (disambiguation)
