= Koffler accelerator =

Particle acclerator and observatory in the Weizmann institute

Coordinates: 31°54′29″N 34°48′44″E

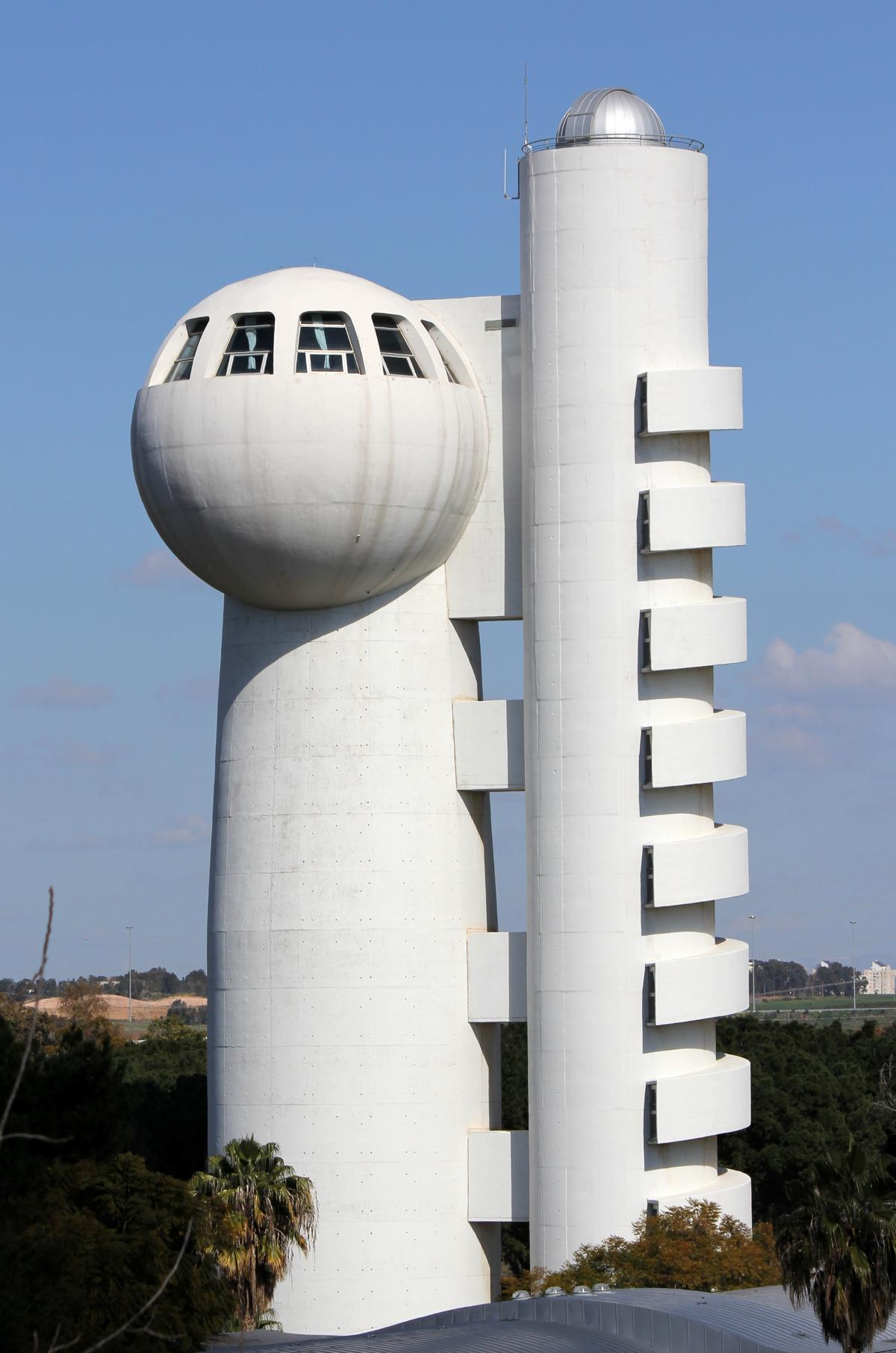
Koffler accelerator

The Koffler particle accelerator of the Weizmann Institute of Science in Rehovot, Israel, was built in 1976. The building became a symbol of the institute. In 2011, an astronomical observatory was opened on the top of the building.

== Building ==
The accelerator building, designed by architect Moshe Harel in Formalist style, was completed in 1976. It has two towers, of 57 and 53 meters high, and an "egg-shaped structure", 22 by 14 meters in its widest points. It became a symbol of the Weizmann Institute of Science. It was designed to have "a close resemblance to the original van de Graaff accelerators". It is named after Murray Koffler, who was the first Chair of Weizmann Canada. Now it serves as a conference hall.

== Accelerator ==
The original accelerator installed in 1977 was a 14UD pelletron tandem accelerator, built by National Electrostatics Corp.

== Observatory ==
The Martin S. Kraar Observatory on top of the accelerator building was opened in 2011. It is named after the philanthropist Martin S. Kraar. The observatory is remotely-operated. There are two telescopes there, the larger one is 41 cm, and the second one is 80 mm guide telescope, both connected to CCD cameras.

== Gallery ==
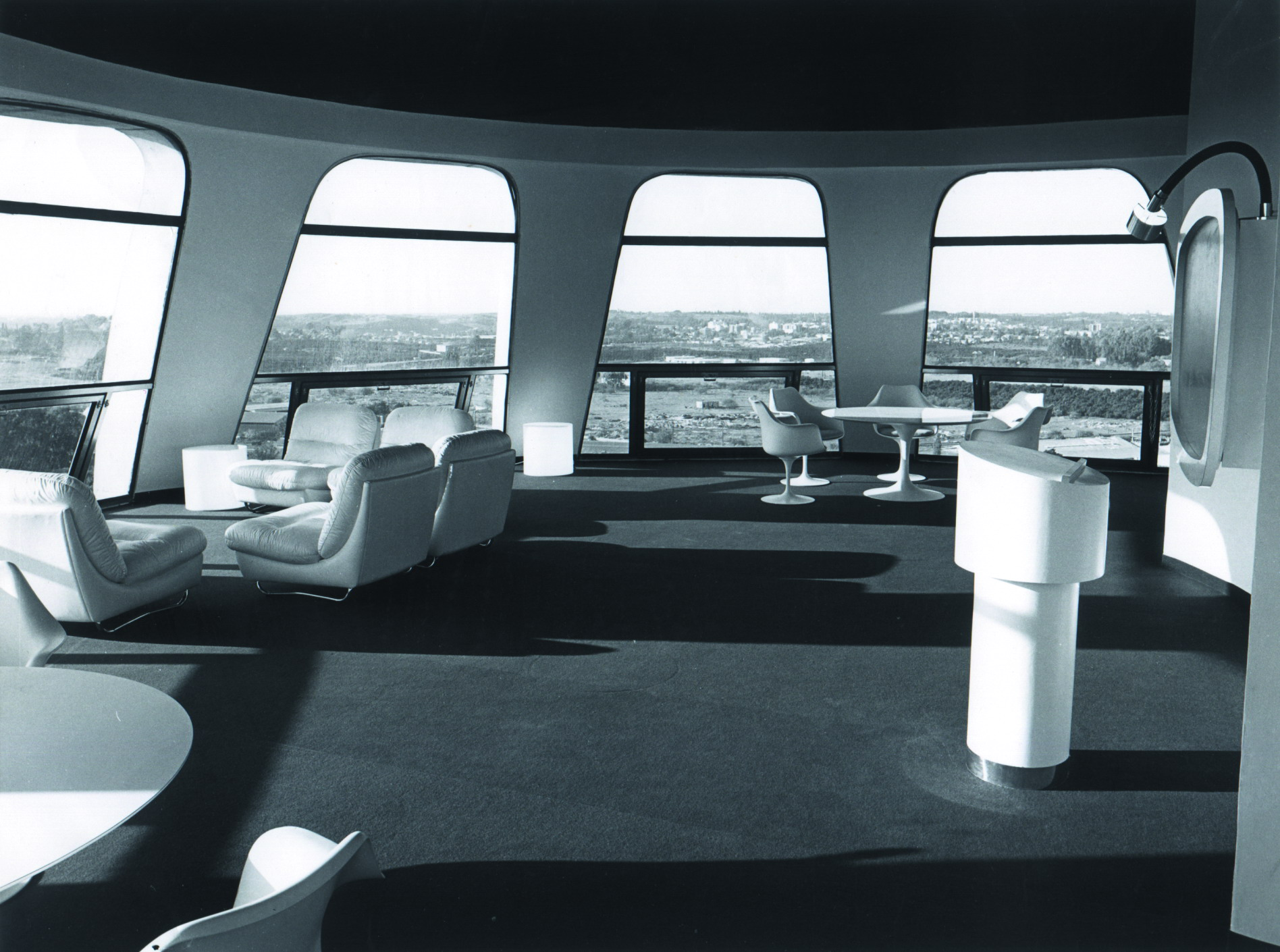
View from the conference room

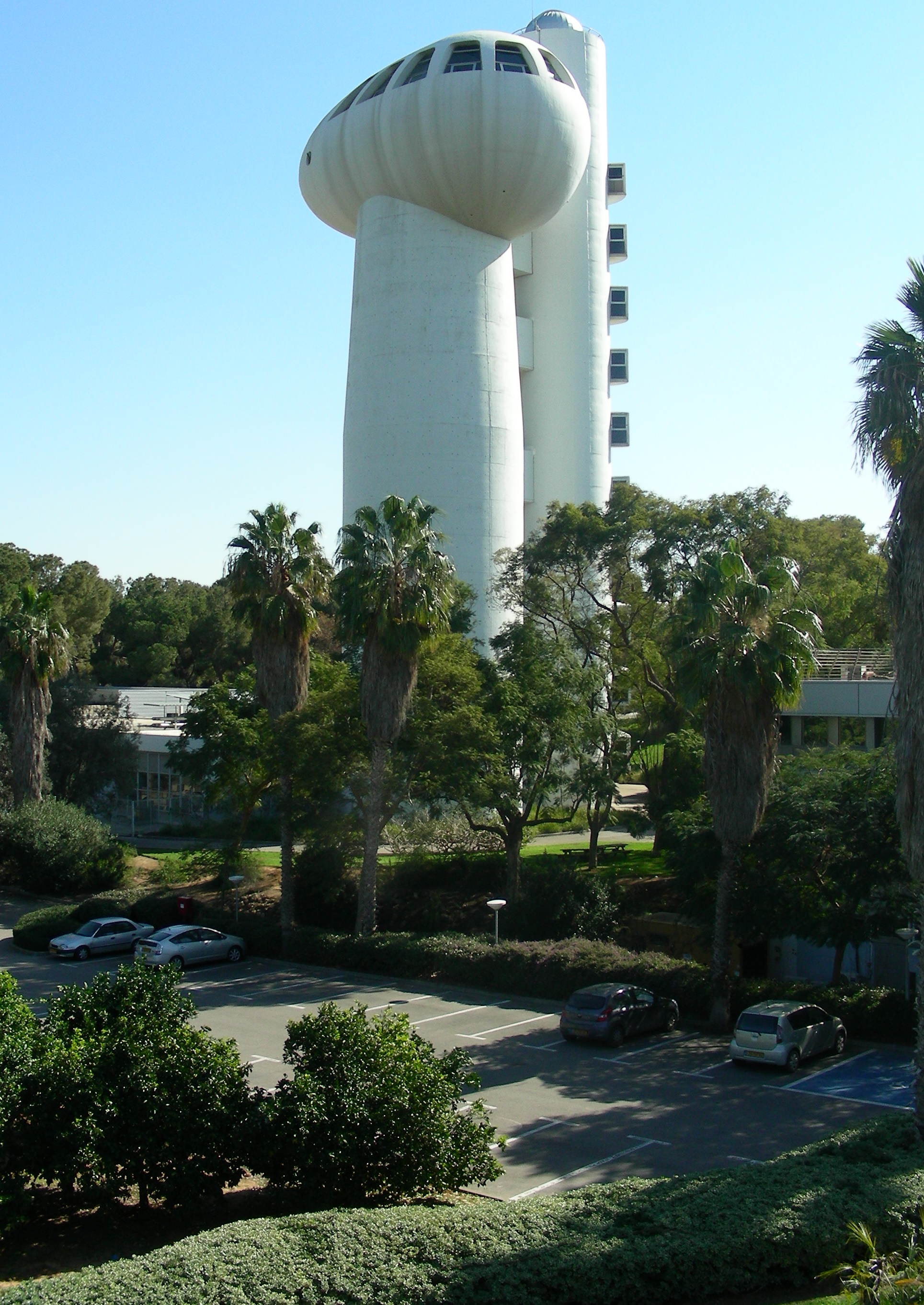

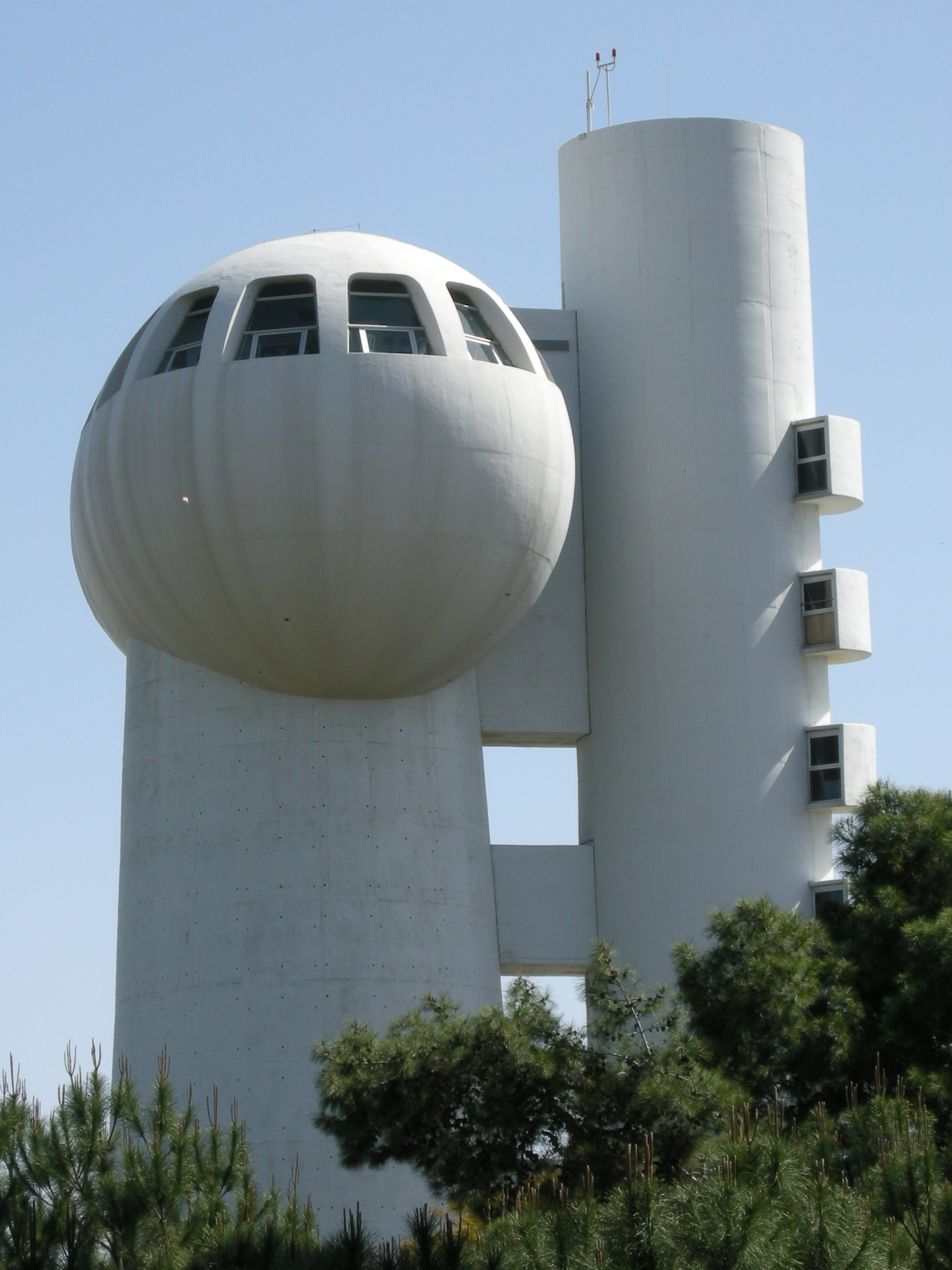

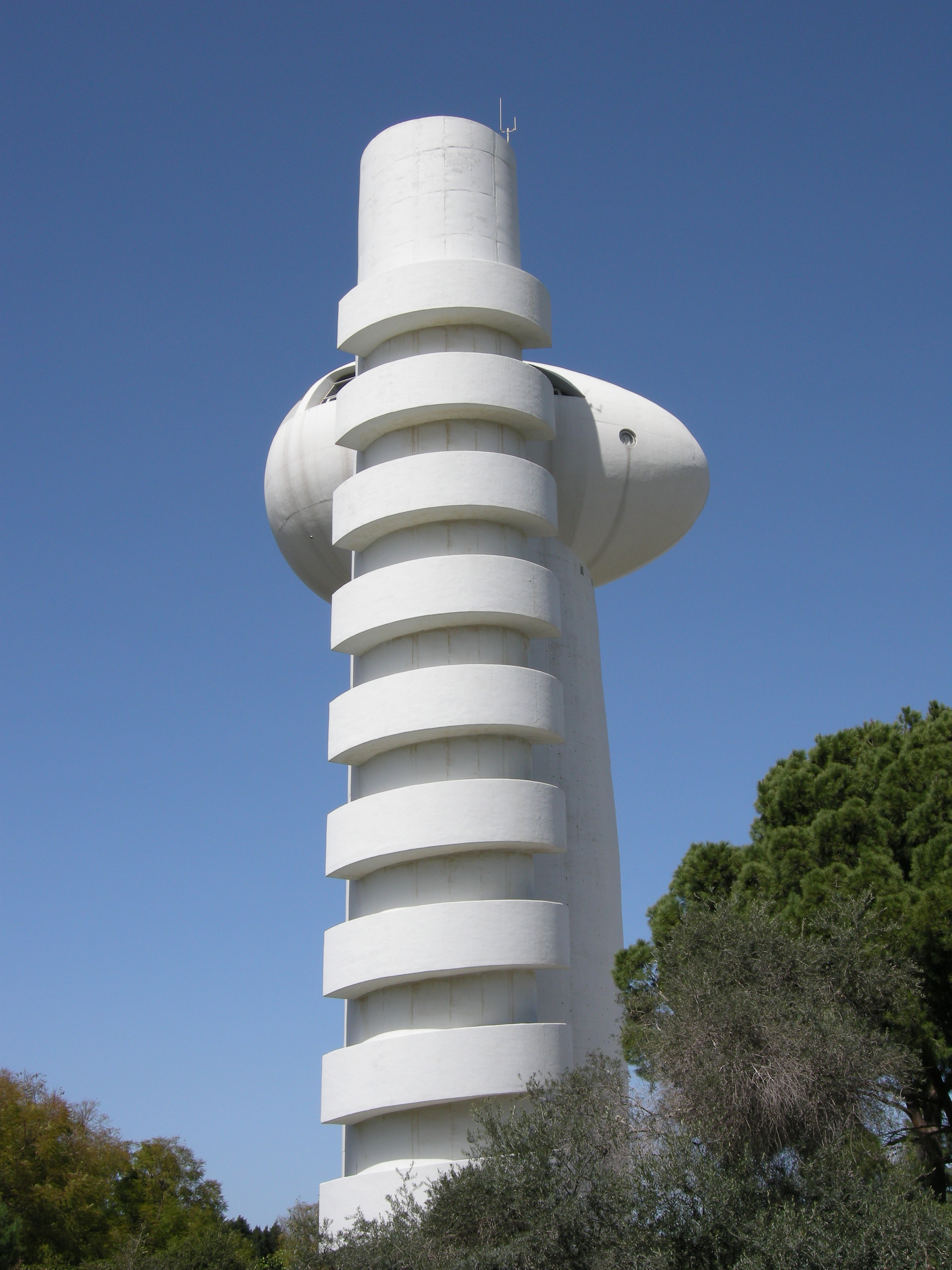

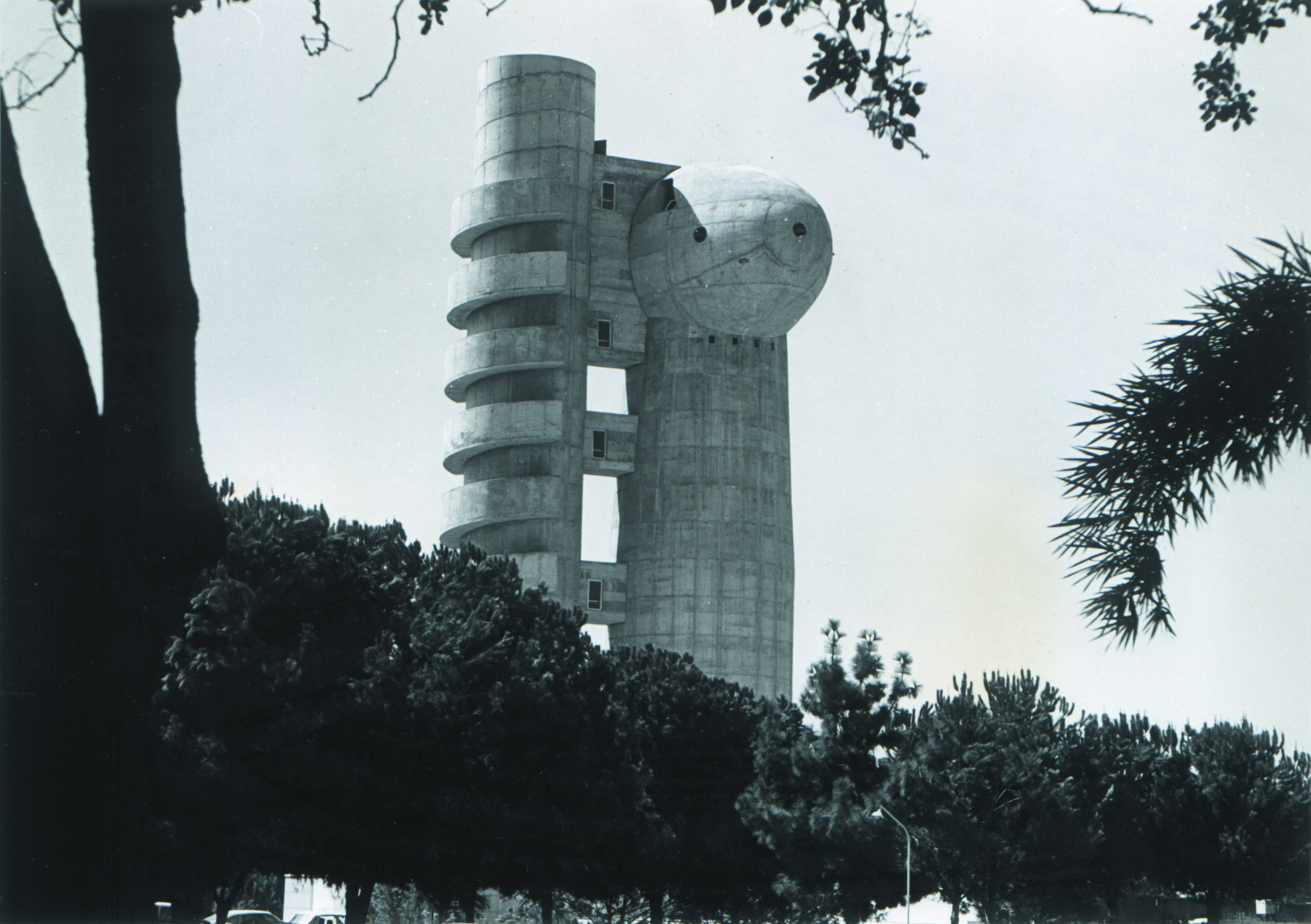
