= List of jazz biographies =

This is a list of English-language book-length biographies and autobiographies of notable jazz musicians. The list is alphabetical by subject. Within subject, books are listed alphabetically by author. A list of related works contains books of related interest that do not meet the criteria for the main list: biographical collections, interview collections, and so on. This list is alphabetical by author.

== Main list ==
Allen, Red (1906/08–1967)

- Chilton, John. Ride, Red, Ride: The Life of Henry "Red" Allen. New York: Cassell, 1999.

Armstrong, Louis (1901–1971)

- Armstrong, Louis. Satchmo: My Life in New Orleans. New York: Da Capo Press, 1954.
- Bergreen, Laurence. Louis Armstrong: An Extravagant Life. New York: Broadway Books, 1997.
- Teachout, Terry. Pops: A Life of Louis Armstrong. Boston: Houghton Mifflin Harcourt, 2009.

Baker, Chet (1929–1988)

- Gavin, James. Deep in a Dream: The Long Night of Chet Baker. New York: Alfred A. Knopf, 2002.

Barber, Chris (1930–2021)

- Barber, Chris, and Alyn Shipton. Jazz Me Blues. Equinox Publishing Ltd, 2014

Barker, Danny (1909–1994)

- Barker, Danny, and Alyn Shipton. A Life in Jazz. New York: Oxford University Press, 1986.

Basie, Count (1904–1984)

- Basie, Count. Good Morning Blues: The Autobiography of Count Basie as Told to Albert Murray. London: Paladin Books, 1987.

Bechet, Sidney (1897–1959)

- Bechet, Sidney. Treat it Gentle. New York: Hill and Wang, 1960.
- Chilton, John. Sidney Bechet: The Wizard of Jazz. New York: Oxford University Press, 1987.

Beiderbecke, Bix (1903–1931)

- Berton, Ralph. Remembering Bix. New York: Harper & Row, 1974.
- Evans, Philip R. and Linda K. Bix: The Leon Bix Beiderbecke Story. Bakersfield, California: Prelike Press, 1998.
- Lion, Jean Pierre, translated by Gabriella Page-Fort. Bix: The Definitive Biography Of A Jazz Legend. New York: Continuum Publishers, 2004.
- Sudhalter, Richard M., Philip R. Evans and William Dean-Myatt. Bix: Man and Legend. New Rochelle, NY: Arlington House, 1974.

Berigan, Bunny (1908–1942)

- Dupuis, Robert. Bunny Berigan: Elusive Legend of Jazz. Baton Rouge: Louisiana University Press, 1993.
- Zirpolo, Michael P. Mr. Trumpet: The Trials, Tribulations, and Triumph of Bunny Berigan. Lanham, Md.: Scarecrow Press, 2011.

Blake, Eubie (1887–1983)

- Rose, Al. Eubie Blake. New York: Schirmer Books, 1979.

Bolden, Buddy (1877–1931)

- Marquis, Donald M. In Search of Buddy Bolden: First Man of Jazz. Baton Rouge: Louisiana University Press, 1978.

Breau, Lenny (1941–1984)

- Forbes-Roberts, Ron. One Long Tune: The Life and Music of Lenny Breau. Denton: University of North Texas Press, 2006.

Burton, Gary (born 1943)

- Burton, Gary. Learning to Listen. Boston: Berklee Press, 2013.

Brown, Clifford (1930–1956)

- Catalano, Nick. Clifford Brown: The Life and Art of the Legendary Jazz Trumpeter. Oxford: Cambridge University Press, 2000.

Bushell, Garvin (1902–1991)

- Bushell, Garvin, as told to Mark Tucker. Jazz from the Beginning. Ann Arbor: University of Michigan Press, 1988.

Christian, Charlie (1916–1942)

- Broadbent, Peter. Charlie Christian: Solo Flight – The Seminal Electric Guitarist, Second Edition. Blaydon on Tyne: Ashley Mark, 2003.

Coleman, Ornette (1930–2015)

- Litweiler, John. Ornette Coleman: A Harmolodic Life. London: Quartet Books, 1992.

Coltrane, John (1926–1967)

- Porter, Lewis. John Coltrane: His Life and Music. Ann Arbor: University of Michigan Press, 1999.

Condon, Eddie (1905–1973)

- Condon, Eddie, with Thomas Sugrue. We Called It Music: A Generation of Jazz. New York: Da Capo Press, 1947.

Davis, Miles (1926–1991)

- Davis, Miles, and Quincy Troupe. Miles: The Autobiography. New York: Simon and Schuster, 1989.

Desmond, Paul (1924–1977)

- Ramsey, Doug, Dave Brubeck, Iola Brubeck, and Paul Caulfield. Take Five: The Public and Private Lives of Paul Desmond. Seattle: Parkside Publications, 2005.

Dodds, Baby (1898–1959)

- Dodds, Baby, and Larry Gara. The Baby Dodds Story (Revised Edition). Baton Rouge: Louisiana State University Press, 1992.

Dorsey, Tommy (1905–1956)

- Levinson, Peter J. Tommy Dorsey: Living in a Great Big Way. Cambridge, MA: Da Capo Press, 2005.

Eldridge, Roy (1911–1989)

- Chilton, John. Roy Eldridge: Little Jazz Giant. New York: Continuum, 2002.

Ellington, Duke (1899–1974)

- Ellington, Duke. Music is My Mistress. Garden City, N.Y.: Doubleday, 1973.

Evans, Bill (1929–1980)

- Pettinger, Peter. Bill Evans: How My Heart Sings. New Haven: Yale University Press, 1998.

Freeman, Bud (1906–1991)

- Freeman, Bud. You Don't Look Like a Musician. Detroit: Belamp Publications, 1974.
- Freeman, Bud. If You Know of a Better Life Please Tell Me. Dublin: B. Eaves, 1976.
- Freeman, Bud and Robert Wolf. Crazeology: The Autobiography of a Chicago Jazzman. Urbana: University of Illinois Press, 1989.

Getz, Stan (1927–1991)

- Gelly, Dave. Stan Getz: Nobody Else But Me. San Francisco: Backbeat Books, 2002.
- Maggin, Donald L. Stan Getz: A Life in Jazz. New York: W. Morrow and Co., 1996.

Gillespie, Dizzy (1917–1993)

- Gillespie, Dizzy. To Be, Or Not... To Bop: Memoirs. Garden City, NY: Doubleday, 1979.
- Maggin, Donald L. Dizzy: The Life and Times of John Birks Gillespie. New York: HarperEntertainment, 2005.
- Shipton, Alyn. Groovin' High: The Life of Dizzy Gillespie. New York: Chelsea House Publishers, 1991.

Goodman, Benny (1909–1986)

- Collier, James Lincoln. Benny Goodman and the Swing Era. New York: Oxford University Press, 1989.
- Firestone, Ross. Swing, Swing, Swing: The Life and Times of Benny Goodman. New York: W. W. Norton and Co., 1993.

Gordon, Dexter (1923–1990)

- Britt, Stan. Dexter Gordon: A Musical Biography. New York: Da Capo Press, 1989.

Green Grant (1935–1979)

- Andrews Green Sharony. Grant Green: Rediscovering the Forgotten Genius of Jazz Guitar. New York: Backbeat Books, 2002

Hampton, Lionel (1908–2002)

- Hampton, Lionel and James Haskins. Hamp: An Autobiography. New York: Warner Books, 1989.

Hawes, Hampton (1928–1977)

- Hawes, Hampton and Don Asher. Raise Up Off Me: A Portrait of Hampton Hawes. New York: Da Capo Press, 1979.

Hawkins, Coleman (1904–1969)

- Chilton, John. The Song of the Hawk: The Life and Recordings of Coleman Hawkins. Ann Arbor: University of Michigan Press, 1990.

Heath, Jimmy (1926–2020)

- Heath, Jimmy, and Joseph McLaren. I Walked with Giants: The Autobiography of Jimmy Heath. Philadelphia: Temple University Press, 2010.

Henderson, Fletcher (1897–1952)

- Magee, Jeffrey. The Uncrowned King of Swing: Fletcher Henderson and Big Band Jazz. New York: Oxford University Press, 2005.

Hendricks, Jon (1921-2017)

- Jones, Peter. This is Bop: Jon Hendricks and the Art of Vocal Jazz. Sheffield: Equinox Publishing, 2020.

Herman, Woody (1913–1987)

- Lees, Gene. Leader of the Band: The Life of Woody Herman. New York: Oxford University Press, 1995.

Hersch, Fred (born 1955)

- Hersch, Fred. Good Things Happen Slowly: A Life In and Out of Jazz. New York: Crown Archetype, 2017.

Hines, Earl (1903–1983)

- Dance, Stanley. The World of Earl Hines. New York: Scribner, 1977.

Hinton, Milt (1910–2000)

- Hinton, Milt, David G. Berger, and Holly Maxson. Playing the Changes: Milt Hinton's Life in Stories and Photographs. Nashville: Vanderbilt University Press, 2008.

Holiday, Billie (1915–1959)

- Nicholson, Stuart. Billie Holiday. Boston: Northeastern University Press, 1995.

James, Harry (1916–1983)

- Levinson, Peter J. Trumpet Blues: The Life of Harry James. New York: Oxford University Press, 1999.

Jarrett, Keith (boen 1945)

- Carr, Ian. Keith Jarrett: The Man and His Music. London: Grafton, 1991.

Johnson, Bunk (ca. 1879 to 1889–1949)

- Hazeldine, Mike, and Barry Martin. Bunk Johnson: Song of the Wanderer. New Orleans: Jazzology Press, 2000.
- Hillman, Christopher. Bunk Johnson: His Life and Times. New York: Universe Books, 1988.

Johnson, J. J. (1924–2001)

- Berrett, Joshua and Louis G. Bourgois. The Musical World of J. J. Johnson. Lanham, Md.: Scarecrow Press, 1999.

Johnson, James P. (1894–1955)

- Brown, Scott E., and Robert Hilbert. James P. Johnson: A Case of Mistaken Identity. Metuchen, N.J.: Scarecrow Press and the Institute of Jazz Studies, Rutgers University, 1986.

Kessel, Barney

- Kessel, Jo. Barney Kessel: A Jazz Legend. Oklahoma Heritage Association, 2014
- Summerfield, Maurice J. Barney Kessel: A Jazz Legend. Ashley Mark, 2008

Kirk, Andy (1898–1992)

- Kirk, Andy and Amy Lee. Twenty Years on Wheels. Ann Arbor: University of Michigan Press, 1989.

Kirk, Rahsaan Roland (1935–1977)

- Kruth, John. Bright Moments: The Life and Legacy of Rahsaan Roland Kirk. New York: Welcome Rain Publishers, 2000.

Konitz, Lee (1927–2020)

- Hamilton, Andy, and Lee Konitz. Lee Konitz: Conversations on the Improviser's Art. Ann Arbor: University of Michigan Press, 2007.

LaFaro, Scott (1936–1961)

- LaFaro-Fernández, Helene. Jade Visions: The Life and Music of Scott LaFaro. Denton, TX: University of North Texas Press, 2009.

Lunceford, Jimmie (1902–1947)

- Determeyer, Eddy. Rhythm is our Business: Jimmie Lunceford and the Harlem Express. Ann Arbor: University of Michigan Press, 2006.

Marsh, Warne (1927–1987)

- Chamberlain, Safford. An Unsung Cat: The Life and Music of Warne Marsh. Lanham, Md.: Scarecrow Press, 2000.

Mehldau, Brad

- Mehldau, Brad. Formation. Sheffield: Equinox, 2023.

Metheny, Pat

- Niles, Richard. The Pat Metheny Interviews. Hal Leonard, 2009.

Mezzrow, Mezz (1899–1972)

- Mezzrow, Mezz, and Bernard Wolfe. Really the Blues. New York: Random House, 1946.

Mingus, Charles (1922–1979)

- Mingus, Charles. Beneath the Underdog: His World as Composed by Mingus. New York: Knopf, 1971.

Monk, Thelonious (1917–1982)

- Kelley, Robin D. G. Thelonious Monk: The Life and Times of an American Original. New York: Free Press, 2009.
- Fitterling, Thomas. Thelonious Monk: His Life and Music (Revised Edition). Berkeley: Berkeley Hills Books, 1997.

Morgan, Lee (1938–1972)

- McMillan, Jeff. Delightfulee: The Life and Music of Lee Morgan. Ann Arbor: University of Michigan Press, 2008.

Morton, Jelly Roll (1880s–1941)

- Reich, Howard, and William Gaines. Jelly's Blues: The Life, Music, and Redemption of Jelly Roll Morton. Cambridge, Mass.: Da Capo Press, 2003.

Murphy, Mark (1932-2015)

- Jones, Peter. This is Hip: the Life of Mark Murphy. Sheffield: Equinox Publishing, 2018.

Nichols, Herbie (1919–1963)

- Miller, Mark. Herbie Nichols: A Jazzist's Life. Toronto: Mercury Press Publishers, 2009.

Oliver, King (1885–1938)

- Williams, Martin T. King Oliver. New York: Barnes, 1961.

Ory, Edward "Kid" (1886–1973)

- McCusker, John. Creole Trombone: Kid Ory and the Early Years of Jazz. Jackson, Mississippi: University Press of Mississippi, 2012.

Parker, Charlie (1920–1955)

- Giddens, Gary. Celebrating Bird: The Triumph of Charlie Parker. New York: Beech Tree Books, 1987.
- Harrison, Max. Charlie Parker. New York: Barnes, 1960.
- Priestley, Brian. Chasin' the Bird: The Life and Legacy of Charlie Parker. New York: Oxford University Press, 2006.
- Russell, Ross. Bird Lives: The High Life and Hard Times of Charlie (Yardbird) Parker. New York: Charterhouse, 1973.
- Woideck, Carl. Charlie Parker: His Music and Life. Ann Arbor: University of Michigan Press, 1996.

Pastorius, Jaco (1951–1987)

- Milkowski, Bill. Jaco. Backbeat, 2005.

Pepper, Art (1925–1982)

- Pepper, Art and Laurie. Straight Life: The Story of Art Pepper. New York: Schirmer Books, 1979.

Peterson, Oscar (1925–2007)

- Barris, Alex. Oscar Peterson: A Musical Biography. Toronto: HarperCollins, 2002.
- Lees, Gene. Oscar Peterson: The Will to Swing. Rocklin, Cal.: Prima Publishing, 1990.
- Peterson, Oscar. A Jazz Odyssey: The Life of Oscar Peterson. New York: Continuum Books, 2002.

Pizzarelli, John (born 1960)

- Pizzarelli, John. World on a String. Wiley, 2012

Powell, Bud (1924–1966)

- Paudras, Francis. Dance of the Infidels: A Portrait of Bud Powell. New York: Da Capo Press, 1998.

Rich, Buddy (1917–1987)

- Tormé, Mel. Traps, The Drum Wonder: The Life of Buddy Rich. New York: Oxford University Press, 1991.

Rollins, Sonny (1930–2026)

- Nisenson, Eric. Open Sky: Sonny Rollins and His World of Improvisation. New York: St. Martin's Press, 2000.

Russell, George (1923–2009)

- Heining, Duncan. George Russell: The Story of An American Composer. Lanham, Maryland: Scarecrow Press, 2010.

Russell, Pee Wee (1906–1969)

- Hilbert, Robert. Pee Wee Russell: The Life of a Jazzman. New York: Oxford University Press, 1993.

Scott, Hazel (1920–1981)

- Chilton, Karen. Hazel Scott: The Pioneering Journey of a Jazz Pianist, from Cafe Society to Hollywood to HUAC. Ann Arbor: University of Michigan Press, 2008.

Shaw, Artie (1910–2004)

- Shaw, Artie. The Trouble with Cinderella: An Outline of Identity. New York: Farrar, Straus and Young, 1952.

Shorter, Wayne (1933–2023)

- Mercer, Michelle. Footprints: The Life and Work of Wayne Shorter. New York: J.P. Tarcher/Penguin, 2004.

Silver, Horace (1928–2014)

- Silver, Horace. Let's Get to the Nitty Gritty: The Autobiography of Horace Silver. Berkeley: University of California Press, 2007.

Smith, Johnny (1922–2013)

- Flanagan, Lin. Moonlight in Vermont: The Official Biography of Johnny Smith. Centerstream, 2015

Snow, Valaida (1904–1956)

- Miller, Mark. High Hat, Trumpet, and Rhythm: The Life and Music of Valaida Snow. Toronto: Mercury Press, 2007.

Strayhorn, Billy (1915–1967)

- Hajdu, David. Lush Life: A Biography of Billy Strayhorn. New York: Farrar, Straus, and Giroux, 1996.

Sun Ra (1914–1993)

- Szwed, John F. Space is the Place: The Lives and Times of Sun Ra. New York, Pantheon Books, 1997.

Tapscott, Horace (1934–1999)

- Tapscott, Horace, and Steven Louis Isoardi. Songs of the Unsung: The Musical and Social Journey of Horace Tapscott. Durham: Duke University Press, 2001.

Tatum, Art (1909–1956)

- Lester, James. Too Marvelous for Words: The Life and Genius of Art Tatum. New York: Oxford University Press, 1994.

Tristano, Lennie (1919–1978)

- Ind, Peter. Jazz Visions: Lennie Tristano and His Legacy. Oakville, Conn.: Equinox Publishing, 2005.
- Shim, Eunmi. Lennie Tristano: His Life in Music. Ann Arbor: University of Michigan Press, 2007.

Twardzik, Dick (1931–1955)

- Chambers, Jack. Bouncin' With Bartok: The Incomplete Works of Richard Twardzik. Toronto: Mercury Press Publishers, 2008.

Waller, Fats (1904–1943)

- Shipton, Alyn. Fats Waller: The Cheerful Little Earful. New York: Continuum, 2002.
- Waller, Maurice, and Anthony Calabrese. Fats Waller. New York: Schirmer Books, 1977.

Webster, Ben (1909–1973)

- Büchmann-Møller, Frank. Someone to Watch Over Me: The Life and Music of Ben Webster. Ann Arbor: University of Michigan Press, 2006.
- de Valk, Jeroen. Ben Webster: His Life and Music. Berkeley: Berkeley Hills Books, 2001.

Wilber, Bob (1928–2019)

- Wilber, Bob, and Derek Webster. Music Was Not Enough. New York: Oxford University Press, 1988.

Williams, Mary Lou (1910–1981)

- Dahl, Linda. Morning Glory: A Biography of Mary Lou Williams. New York: Pantheon Books, 1999.

Young, Lester (1909–1959)

- Büchmann-Møller, Frank. You Just Fight for Your Life: The Story of Lester Young. New York: Praeger, 1990.
- Gelly, Dave. Being Prez: The Life and Music of Lester Young. New York: Oxford University Press, 2007.

== Related works ==
- Barker, Danny, and Alan Shipton. Buddy Bolden and the Last Days of Storyville. New York: Cassell, 1998.
- Gitler, Ira. Jazz Masters of the Forties. New York: McMillan Co., 1966.
- Goldberg, Joe. Jazz Masters of the Fifties. New York: McMillan Co., 1965.
- Gourse, Leslie. Madame Jazz: Contemporary Women Instrumentalists. New York: Oxford University Press, 1995.
- Hadlock, Richard. Jazz Masters of the Twenties. New York: McMillan Co., 1965.
- Lees, Gene. Waiting for Dizzy: Fourteen Jazz Portraits. New York: Cooper Square Press, 2000.
- McPartland, Marian. Marian McPartland's Jazz World: All In Good Time. Champaign: University of Illinois Press, 2005.
- Parker, Chan. My Life in E Flat. Columbia: University of South Carolina Press, 1999.

Parker was the former wife of Charlie Parker and Phil Woods. Her autobiography was originally published in French.

- Reisner, Robert George. Bird: The Legend of Charlie Parker. New York: Da Capo Press, 1962.
- Spellman, A. B. Four Lives in the Bebop Business. New York: Pantheon Books, 1966.

This book contains chapters on Cecil Taylor, Herbie Nichols, Jackie McLean, and Ornette Coleman. It has been reprinted under various titles: Black Music: Four Lives, Four Jazz Lives, etc.

- Stewart, Rex William. Jazz Masters of the Thirties. New York: McMillan Co., 1972.
- Taylor, Art. Notes and Tones: Musician-to-Musician Interviews. New York: Perigree, 1982.
- Williams, Martin T. Jazz Masters in Transition: 1957–69. New York: McMillan Co., 1970.
- Williams, Martin T. Jazz Masters of New Orleans. New York: McMillan Co., 1967.
