= Conformance =

Conformance is how well something, such as a product, service or a system, meets a specified standard and may refer more specifically to:

- Conformance testing, testing to determine whether a product or system meets some specified standard
- SNIA Conformance Testing Program, a program trying to bring third-party standards conformance to the storage networking marketplace

== See also ==
- Conformation (disambiguation), a variety of similar concepts applied to chemicals or animals
