= Weber County Main Library =

Historic building in Ogden, Utah, USA

- U.S. National Register of Historic Places
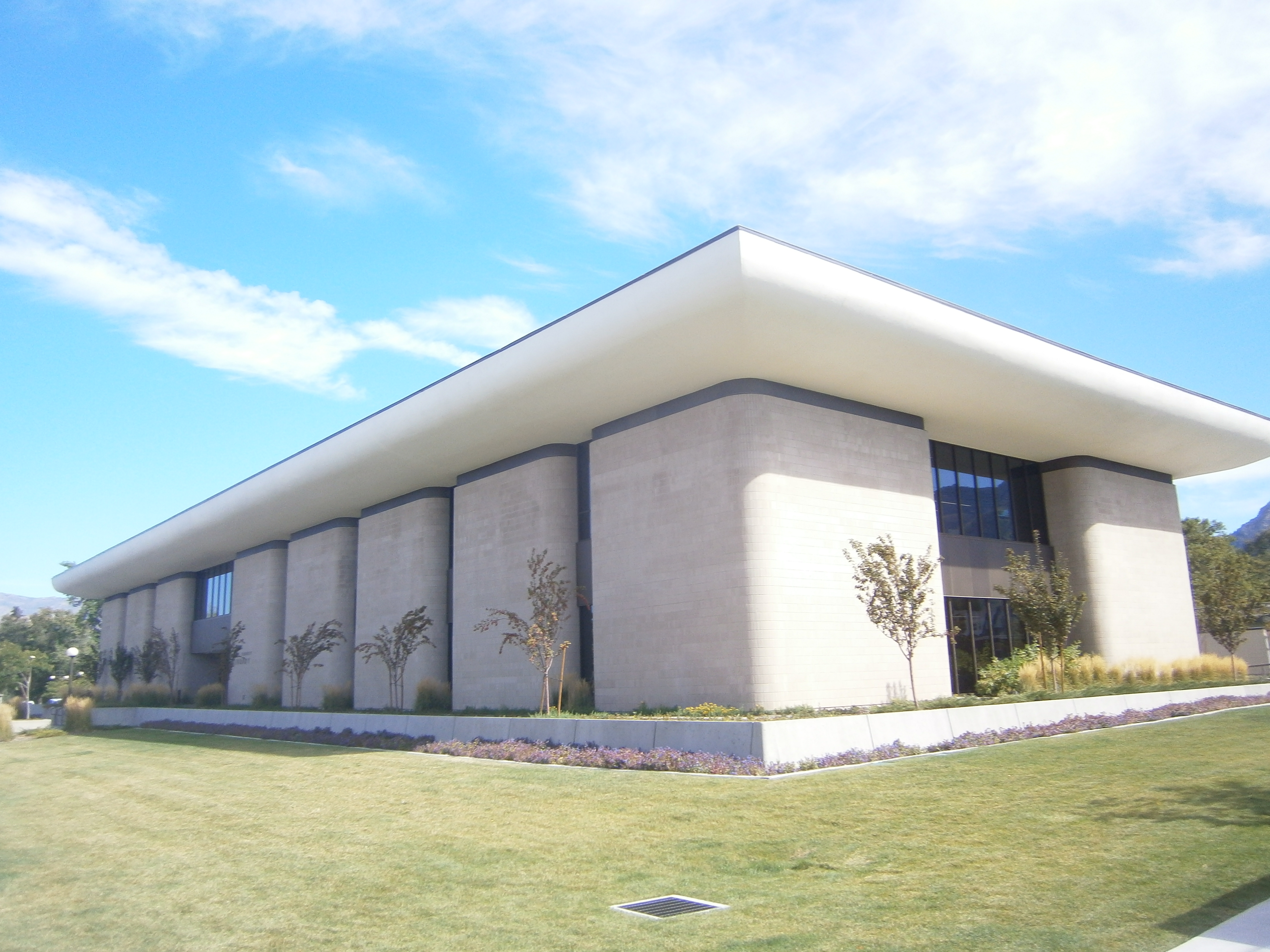

- Location within Utah Location within the United States
- Location: 2464 Jefferson Ave., Ogden, Utah
- Coordinates: 41°13′16″N 111°57′54″W
- Area: 2.43 acres (0.98 ha)
- Built: 1968
- Architect: John L. Piers
- NRHP reference No.: 100004395
- Added to NRHP: September 13, 2019

The Weber County Main Library, at 2464 Jefferson Ave. in Ogden, Utah, was listed on the National Register of Historic Places in 2019.

It is a New Formalist style building designed by architect John L. Piers (1922–1997) and built in 1968. It is 230 by 80 feet (70 m × 24 m) in plan.

Others involved in its creation are Kenneth E. Hasenoehrl and Donald W. Mathewson as associate architects, and Edmund W. Allen.

Piers also received assistance from Charlotte, North Carolina–based Galvin-Van Buren Associates.
