= FORM =

FORM may refer to:

- FORM (symbolic manipulation system), a symbolic manipulation system.
- Form (arts organisation), a Western Australian arts organisation
- First-order reliability method, a method to evaluate the reliability of a civil engineering structure

== See also ==
- Form (disambiguation)
