= Beneath the Underdog =

1971 autobiography by Charles Mingus

- Hardcover edition
- Author: Charles Mingus
- Original title: Beneath the Underdog: His World as Composed by Mingus
- Language: English
- Genre: Non-fiction
- Publisher: Alfred A. Knopf
- Publication date: 1971
- Publication place: United States
- Media type: Print
- Pages: 366 pp.
- ISBN: 9780394436227

Beneath the Underdog: His World as Composed by Mingus is the autobiography of jazz bassist and composer Charles Mingus. It was first published in 1971, by Alfred A. Knopf.

== Background ==
Mingus worked on his autobiography for more than two decades. One newspaper indicated in October 1961 that the book "is due out in a couple of weeks". The following year, The New York Times reported that author Louis Lomax was collaborating with Mingus in the writing and editing of "an eight-year-old, portly, angry manuscript of 1,500 pages", and that publishers in France and Japan had bid for the book. The original proposed title was Memoirs of a Half Yellow Schitt Covered Nigger.

It was finally published by Alfred A. Knopf in 1971. The published form, edited by Nel King, reduced the original manuscript by more than two thirds. Before editing, the typescript contained mostly dialog; a lot of the prose was formed during King's second edit. She chose to retain the pimp stories, thereby giving them greater prominence than in the original manuscript; this decision may have been related to the commercial success of Iceberg Slim's book, Pimp, in the late 1960s.

== Reception ==
The reviewer for the journal Notes commented that "the reader is forced to plow through page after page of erotica (some might label it pornography) in order to ferret out the most basic kind of information about the man and his music." The Washington Post's reviewer stated that the book is "sexual fantasy and tortured personality conflict", and complained that there was little information about Mingus' music or those he played with. The Observer's reviewer believed that "Mingus has made a contribution to recent American literature that even his well-wishers could not have anticipated", and stressed that the bassist had described "what it feels like to be an artist – actually be it, in a world that is not only trying to stop you being an artist but has tried to stop you being human in the first place."

Writer Toby Litt stated that "His autobiography is that of a profoundly troubled, often bitter man who never feels loved enough but constantly undermines those loves offered to him."

Mingus' last wife, Sue Mingus, indicated that the book was an account of "the superficial Mingus, the flashy one, not the real one."

== Legacy ==
The original manuscript was acquired, along with other material documenting Mingus' life, by the Library of Congress in 1993.

Readings from the book were included in Hal Willner's recording, Weird Nightmare: Meditations on Mingus.

== See also ==
- List of jazz biographies
