= Cambridge Tower =

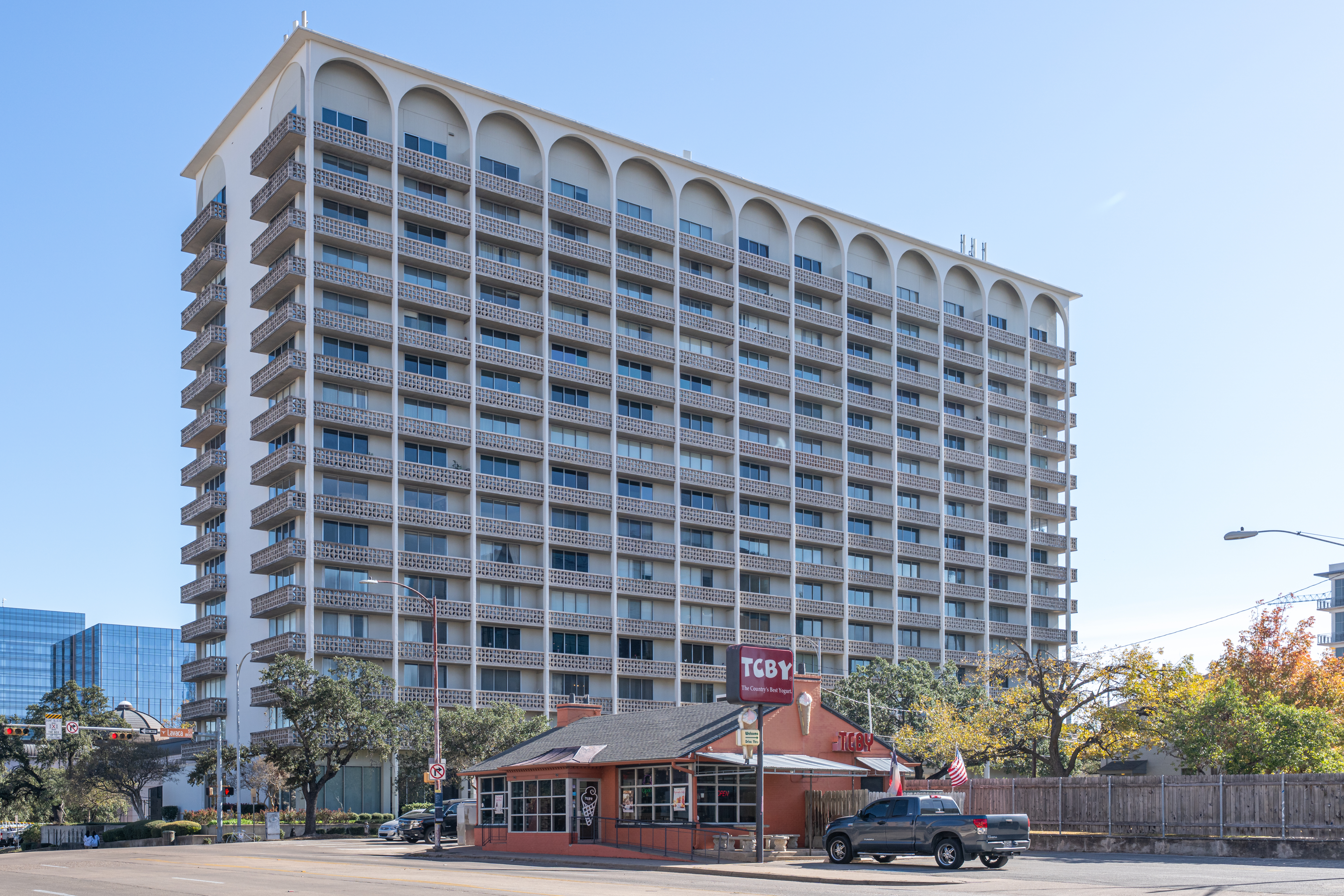
- Interactive map of the Cambridge Tower area

General information
- Type: Condominium
- Architectural style: New Formalism
- Location: 1801 Lavaca St, Austin, Texas
- Completed: February 28, 1965
- Opening: May 1, 1965

Height
- Height: 181 feet (55 m)

Technical details
- Floor count: 15

Design and construction
- Architect: Thomas E. Stanley
- Main contractor: Thomas J. Hayman of Dallas
- Cambridge Tower
- U.S. National Register of Historic Places
- Location within Texas Location within the United States
- Coordinates: 30.280714°N 97.740472°W
- Area: less than one acre
- NRHP reference No.: 100002603
- Added to NRHP: June 20, 2018

Cambridge Tower is a building in Austin, Texas, United States, that opened in 1965 as a luxury apartment tower. The building was designed by Dallas-based architect Thomas E. Stanley, and contains numerous New Formalism architectural elements including balconies adorned with brise soleil columns and ornamental breeze blocks. The building currently operates as a condominium. It was listed on the National Register of Historic Places on June 20, 2018.

== See also ==
- National Register of Historic Places listings in Travis County, Texas
