= Mathew D. McCubbins =

American political scientist (1956–2021)

Mathew Daniel McCubbins (8 December 1956 – 1 July 2021) was the Ruth F. De Varney Professor of Political Science and professor of law, in the Department of Political Science and School of Law at Duke University.

== Education ==
McCubbins received a B.A. in political science from University of California, Irvine and an M.S. and Ph.D. in social science from the California Institute of Technology.

== Academic career ==
McCubbins was a professor at the University of Texas, Stanford University, University of San Diego Law School, and Washington University in St. Louis. McCubbins spent a majority of his career as a distinguished professor and Chancellor's Associates Chair in the Department of Political Science and in the Graduate School of International Relations and Pacific Studies at the University of California, San Diego. He was an adjunct professor of law at the Gould School of Law at the University of Southern California and Co-Director of the USC - California Institute of Technology Center for the Study of Law and Politics (CSLP) from 2007 to 2010, when he moved to USC to become a Provost Professor of Business, Law, and Political Economy and director of CSLP. Since July 1, 2013 he has been a Professor of Political Science and Law at Duke University and from July 2014 until his death, he was the Ruth F. De Varney Professor of Political Science, professor of law, and director of the Center for the Study of Democracy and the Rule of Law at the Duke Law School, Duke University, Durham, NC.

In 1994-95, McCubbins was a fellow at the Center for Advanced Study in the Behavioral Sciences, and for AY 2013 - 14 he was a W. Glenn Campbell and Rita Ricardo-Campbell National Fellow and the Robert Eckles Swain National Fellow at the Hoover Institution, Stanford University.

== Research ==
McCubbins, who also wrote under the pseudonym McNollgast, with Roger G Noll and Barry R Weingast, is perhaps best known for his work on the actions of legislatures. He put forth the argument that legislative majorities control the veto gates in the legislature which allows them to block unfavorable bills and, thus, allows them to decide what gets voted on and what doesn't. He has also argued that legislatures enact administrative procedure as an instrument of political control. Administrative procedure can be used to stack the deck in terms of who is likely to win and who is likely to lose in rulemaking. McCubbins also argued that legislatures rely on "fire-alarm" oversight, which devolves some of the oversight costs to citizens, rather than through the much less efficient, "police-patrol oversight," wherein legislators hold hearings to acquire information. The trick is how lawmakers can use administrative procedure to establish the necessary and sufficient conditions for citizens to be willing and able to oversee agency rulemaking and to bring agency malfeasance to the attention of lawmakers. A consequence of this widespread use of these tools, he argued, is that Congress has much more power over agency action that is often argued.

He has also studied political communication at its most basic level through use of experiments, by deriving and testing the necessary and sufficient conditions whereby one individual will listen to, trust, be persuaded by, and learn from another individual, and thus when, in turn, they will be able to use what they learn to make reasoned decisions. His most recent experiments have explored the limits of game theory as a tool for understanding cognition. He has also studied group decision making, modeling the interaction as a network, and showing through a set of novel experiments that networks aid the ability of groups to successfully undertake tasks when network interactions are cheap, tasks are easy, network participants share common interest in the outcome, participants have sufficient information about how their and others' actions affect outcomes on the network, or the network participants are highly connected. In these latter experiments, McCubbins again examines how the structure of institutions, such as those defined by administrative procedure or by contracts, affects the information environment and thus affects the ability of people to undertake collective action. He has also argued that while groups can propose and enact popular initiatives and referendums, they only infrequently have the ability to oversee the implementation of policies enacted through direct initiatives and thus direct initiatives rarely affect policy and thus only rarely affect what the legislature would otherwise enact. McCubbins has demonstrated the ineffectiveness of tax and expenditure limitations or TELs.

== Other Academic Achievements ==
McCubbins served for eight years as co-editor of The Journal of Law, Economics, & Organization. Until his death, he was a co-editor of the Journal of Legal Analysis and the Journal of Public Policy. He has served on the editorial boards of Economics and Politics and Legislative Studies Quarterly, and Public Choice, among others. He was one of the key organizers for the Behavioral, Social, and Computer Sciences Seminar Series at UC San Diego.

He also served for nine years on the board of Directors for the Society for Empirical Legal Studies, and was the co-President of the Society in 2009 and 2016. He was the co-creator and co-network director for the Political Science Network within the Social Science Research Network and helped to found the Cognitive Science Network at SSRN.

== Awards ==
McCubbins was elected a fellow of the American Academy of Arts and Sciences in 2001 and was elected a fellow of the American Association for the Advancement of Science (2011). He received the 2008 Chancellor's Associates Faculty Excellence Award for Graduate Teaching. McCubbins was selected as the 2008-2009 UCSD Faculty Research Lecturer. At Duke University, he was awarded the Thomas Langford Lectureship Award for the academic year 2013-14. With D. Roderick Kiewiet, McCubbins was awarded the American Political Science Association's (APSA) 1992 Gladys M. Kammerer Award for The Logic of Delegation: Congressional Parties and the Appropriations Process. For his books with Gary W. Cox, he received the APSA Legislative Studies Section's 1994 Richard F. Fenno Jr. Prize for Legislative Leviathan: Party Government in the House; and the APSA 2005 Leon Epstein Award for Setting the Agenda: Responsible Party Government in the US House of Representatives. He was also awarded the 2016 MPSA Herbert A. Simon Award, "recognizing significant contributions to the scientific study of the bureaucracy." He has won several other awards for his articles and undergraduate teaching.

== Books ==
- The Logic of Delegation: Congressional Parties and the Appropriations Process. (with D. Roderick Kiewiet) Chicago: University of Chicago Press, Spring 1991. Reviews:
- Legislative Leviathan: Party Government in the House. (with Gary W. Cox) Berkeley: University of California Press, Spring 1993. Reviews:
- The Democratic Dilemma: Can Citizens Learn What They Need to Know? (with Arthur Lupia) Cambridge University Press, 1998. Reviews:
- Setting the Agenda: Responsible Party Government in the US House of Representatives (with Gary W. Cox) (STA Online) Cambridge University Press, 2005. Reviews:
