= Conformer =

Clear acrylic shell temporary ocular prosthesis

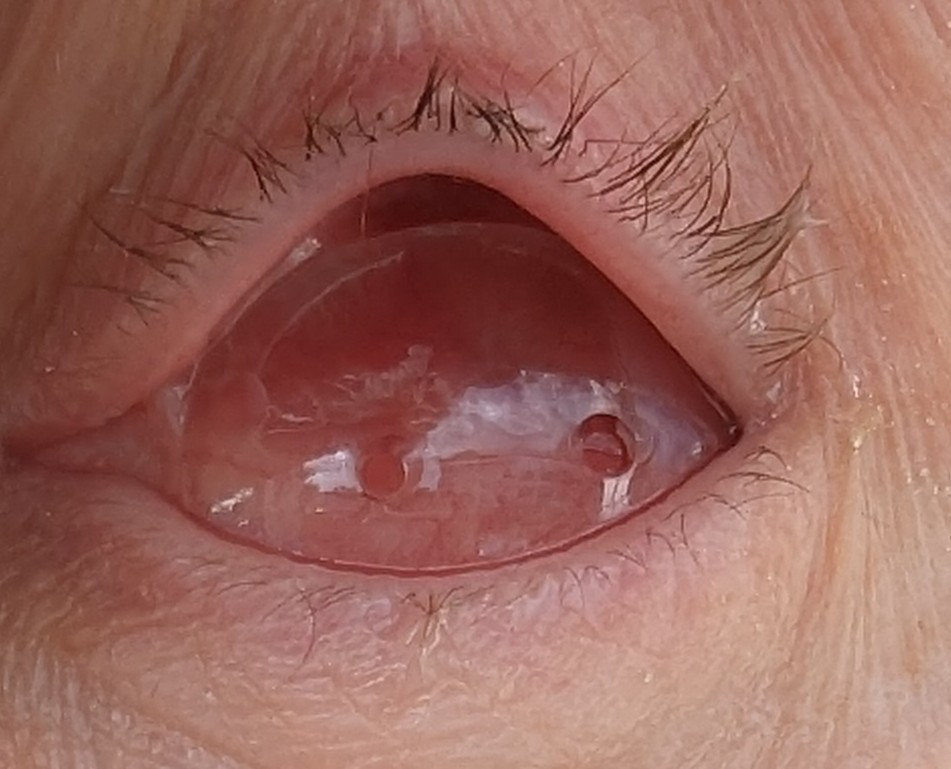
Conformer over eye implant post-enucleation

A conformer is a clear acrylic shell fitted after an enucleation of the eye if the final artificial eye is not available at the time of surgery, to hold the shape of the eye socket and allow the eyelids to blink over the shell without rubbing the suture line. The conformer shell holds the shape ready for the artificial eye, and is worn for six to eight weeks after surgery. Some ocularists will make a temporary artificial eye which can be worn as the conformer shell.
