= Conformal =

Conformal may refer to:

- Conformal (software), in ASIC Software
- Conformal coating in electronics
- Conformal cooling channel, in injection or blow moulding
- Conformal field theory in physics, such as:
  - Boundary conformal field theory
  - Coset conformal field theory
  - Logarithmic conformal field theory
  - Rational conformal field theory
- Conformal fuel tanks on military aircraft
- Conformal hypergraph, in mathematics
- Conformal geometry, in mathematics
- Conformal group, in mathematics
- Conformal map, in mathematics
- Conformal map projection, in cartography
- Conformal prediction, in computer science
