= Formation (book) =

- Author: Brad Mehldau
- Language: English
- Genre: Non-fiction
- Publisher: Equinox
- Publication date: 15 March 2023
- Publication place: United Kingdom
- Media type: Print
- Pages: 312
- ISBN: 9781800503137

Formation: Building a Personal Canon, Part One is an autobiographical book by Brad Mehldau. It describes the first 26 years of his life, stressing the influences on his musical and personal development. The book, characterised by Mehldau as a non-fiction bildungsroman, was published by Equinox in 2023.

== Background ==
Brad Mehldau's career as a pianist and composer began in the early 1990s. After building a reputation as a jazz improviser, he expanded into other areas such as classical, folk and electronic music. Mehldau described Formation as "an autobiographical bildungsroman of sorts, tracing my musical and personal formation up until the age of twenty-six". He recounted that much of the material for the book had been on a computer for at least 15 years, but that he took a long time to identify and form a story based on it.

== Publication and reception ==
Formation was published as a hardback and ebook by Equinox on 15 March 2023, priced at GBP£30 or US$50.

Reviewers mentioned the book's blending of literary styles, allusions to a wide range of musical and literary influences and the disturbing nature of some of its content.

Ted Panken, writing in Down Beat, described Mehldau's book as: "an unflinching account of his turbulent first quarter-century, recounting and intersectionally contextualizing, in searing, transparent detail, the circumstances that framed the establishment of the musical relationships and tonal personality that he has elaborated and refined ever since". The Wall Street Journal reviewer concluded: "Readers of this poignant memoir will discover what Brad Mehldau learned to see during the long course of his formation."

== Future work ==
The book is the first in a planned two-part series. The second "will focus more directly on the jazz canon itself".

== See also ==
- List of jazz biographies
