= Inform (disambiguation) =

Inform is a programming language for interactive fiction.

Inform may also refer to:

- INFORM, Inc., an environmental organization
- INFORM (Information Network Focus on Religious Movements), UK
- INFORM, predecessor of CorVision
- What an informant or informer does
