= Formation (Adekunle Gold song) =

2026 single by Adekunle Gold featuring Olamide

Single by Adekunle Gold featuring Olamide
- Released: 9 April 2026
- Genre: Afrobeats, Fuji-inspired Afrobeats
- Length: 2:36
- Label: Believe UK
- Songwriters: Adekunle Kosoko, Olamide Gbenga Adedeji, Dario Muiz Ishola
- Producer: Chillz

"Formation" is a song by Nigerian singer Adekunle Gold featuring Olamide. It was released on 9 April 2026 as Adekunle Gold's first collaboration with his former YBNL label boss Olamide.

== Background ==
The collaboration was described as a symbolic reunion between Adekunle Gold and Olamide, who previously worked together during Gold's time at YBNL Nation. Fans had anticipated a collaboration between both artists for years.

== Composition ==
The song blends Fuji-inspired rhythms with Afrobeats elements, which Adekunle Gold described as part of his "Electro Fuji" sound.

== Release and reception ==
"Formation" was released across streaming platforms on 9 April 2026. The song received coverage from Nigerian media outlets including Pulse Nigeria, Premium Times, BellaNaija, and TheCable.

== Music video ==
The official music video was released on YouTube on 9 April 2026.
