= Form (cigarette) =

Finnish brand of cigarette

- Product type: Cigarette
- Produced by: Amer-Tupakka (Amer Tobacco), a Finnish subsidiary of Altria
- Country: Finland
- Introduced: 1970s
- Discontinued: Mid 2000s
- Markets: Finland, Estonia

Form was a Finnish brand of cigarettes which was produced by the Finnish "Amer-Tupakka" ("Amer Tobacco"), a Finnish subsidiary of Altria. The original Form cigarette cases were designed by Erkki Ruuhinen.

== History ==
Form was brought to the Finnish cigarette market at the beginning of the 1970s but was discontinued in the mid-2000s after the purchase of Amer Tobacco company by Altria.

Over the years, Form was available in many different versions, which were intended to be distinguished through colours. These included, among others, the soft and hard packs. The available versions are: Form American Full Flavor (black box), Form Menthol (green box), Form Ultra Light (red box), Form Light Number One (blue and white box), Form Kevytmenthol (green and white box) and Form Special (orange box).

The ban on tobacco advertising, which entered into force in 1978 after Amer Tobacco marketed Form cigarettes on a wide range of Formia-branded merchandising, with a logo and coloring resembling the Form cigarette logo.

== See also ==
- Cigarette
- Tobacco smoking
