= Gary W. Cox =

American political scientist (born 1955)

Gary W. Cox (born 23 September 1955), born in Maryland, is a political scientist, the William Bennett Munro Professor of Political Science at Stanford University.

He qualified as a Ph.D., California Institute of Technology, in 1983, was elected a Guggenheim Fellow in 1995, elected to the American Academy of Arts and Sciences in 1996, and was elected to the National Academy of Sciences in 2005.

== Publications ==
- The Efficient Secret, winner of the 1983 Samuel H. Beer dissertation prize and the 2003 George H. Hallett Award
- Legislative Leviathan (w/ Mathew D. McCubbins), Cambridge University Press (1993); winner of the 1993 Richard F Fenno Prize
- Making Votes Count Cambridge University Press (2002) ISBN 0521585279. winner of the 1998 Woodrow Wilson Foundation Award, the 1998 Luebbert Prize and the 2007 George H. Hallett Award
- Setting the Agenda (w/ Mathew D. McCubbins), Cambridge University Press (2003); winner of the 2006 Leon D. Epstein Book Award
- Marketing Sovereign Promises: Monopoly Brokerage and the Growth of the English State, Cambridge University Press (2016)
- Mixed-Member Electoral Systems in Constitutional Context: Taiwan, Japan, and Beyond, with Nathan F. Batto, Chi Huang, and Alexander C. Tan, editors. University of Michigan Press (2016). ISBN 978-0-472-11973-8.

== Sources ==
- "Stanford University: Gary W. Cox".
