= Formal theory =

Formal theory can refer to:

- Another name for a theory which is expressed in formal language
- An axiomatic system, something representable by symbols and its operators
- A formal system
- Formal theory (political science), the theoretical modeling of social systems based on game theory and social choice theory, among other interdisciplinary fields
