= Form (arts organisation) =

Western Australian arts organisation

Form is a Western Australian arts organisation that delivers programming tailored to specific communities throughout the state.

It was known Craftwest until 2004.

== Organisation ==
Form is a non-profit, membership-based, charity-registered arts organisation that focuses on multiartform programming tailored to specific communities. Form currently operates offices and galleries in Perth and Port Hedland, managing a range of exhibitions and projects, consultancy, and professional development services. Form is known for projects that often span several years (see below), and for its ability to generate innovative partnerships with industry and corporate sponsors including Wesfarmers and BHP Billiton.

== Notable projects ==
=== Designing Futures, 2004–2008 ===
Designing Futures was a project focused on the medium of fine wood, in response to the state government's newly instigated regulations to protect Western Australia's old-growth forests. In response to the changed regulations, the project explored design as an alternative to logging, with an international conference of design academics and an exhibition by the world's leading fine wood artists held in Perth in early 2003. Following these events, the focus of the project expanded to other craft mediums, providing professional development to "clusters" of Western Australian craftspeople and designers, with the project culminating in the establishment of Midland Atelier in 2008.

=== Ngurra Kuju Walyja — One Country One People — Canning Stock Route Project, 2006–2013 ===
Ngurra Kuju Walyja — One Country One People — Canning Stock Route Project began in 2006, the centenary year of the founding of the Canning Stock Route, the longest stock route in the Southern Hemisphere established during Western Australia's Federation period. Ngurra Kuju Walyja told an Aboriginal history of the stock route and the effects its construction had on Aboriginal communities. Under the direction of Aboriginal stakeholders, the project grew to incorporate ten remote Aboriginal community art centres; a large cross-cultural team of curators, filmmakers, and cultural advisors; over 120 Aboriginal artists and contributors; and numerous national partners. In late 2008 the National Museum of Australia permanently acquired the Canning Stock Route Collection, 140 artworks curated by the Canning Stock Route Project team over three years, and entered into a partnership with Form to produce an exhibition Yiwarra Kuju – The Canning Stock Route, comprising paintings, cultural artefacts, film, new media, and photography. Yiwarra Kuju launched at the National Museum of Australia in Canberra in July 2010, attracting more visitors to the museum than any other exhibition in its history, before touring Australia. The exhibition showed in Perth as a headlining event in the cultural program accompanying the 2011 Commonwealth Heads of Government Meeting. In collaboration with the Center for Digital Archaeology of Berkeley, Form developed Mira, an online archive of the intangible cultural heritage that was collected throughout the project.

=== Midland Atelier, 2008–2013 ===
Midland Atelier was established in 2008, at the Midland Railway Workshops in collaboration with the Metropolitan Redevelopment Authority (MRA). The MRA was keen to expand the existing wood studio in the site's pattern shop, and worked with Form to house a cluster of fine wood artists who had previously been participants in Designing Futures. The Midland Atelier incorporated a range of studio facilities and craft and design disciplines into the site. The Atelier housed fine wood, furniture, jewellery, and photography studios over its lifetime, in addition to a number of exhibitions, events, and artists in residence.

=== Public, 2014–2016 ===
Public was a three-year project that aimed to "explore creativity as a catalyst for generating public good – for the wellbeing or benefit of society". In 2014 the project comprised Art in the City (Western Australia's first festival of street and wall-based art), Art in the Pilbara (a residency program for participating Public artists), and 100 Hampton Road (a program of creative and professional development for the residents of a lodging house in Fremantle, Western Australia). The initial Art in the City festival in April 2014 included participation by 45 artists from around the world, who created 35 wall-based works across Perth's CBD over 10 days. A satellite project Dear William, a dedication to William Street explored the history of an iconic street within the City of Vincent. In 2015 the project included a symposium on utilising creativity for the public good, and the project expanded to the Wheatbelt, completing large murals on CBH Avon grain silos. In 2016, Public included Public Campus at Curtin University, as well as site specific programming in suburban Claremont and the Great Southern region.

=== The Goods Shed, 2016 + ===
In 2016, Form opened a new cultural facility and visual arts project space in Claremont, Western Australia. In partnership with LandCorp, Form renovated the historic Goods Shed located adjacent to the Claremont Railway Station as an exhibition, residency, and event space. Concurrently Form moved its offices to the Station Masters House on the opposite side of the railway station.

== Significant publications ==
- Midland Atelier, 2008–2013. Form: Perth, Australia, 2013. ISBN 978-0-9872624-5-5
- The Pilbara Project: Field Notes and Photographs (2nd ed.). Form: Perth, Australia, 2012. ISBN 978-0-9872624-1-7
- Ngurra Kuju Walya – One Country One People – Stories from the Canning Stock Route. Form & Macmillan: South Yarra, Australia, 2011. ISBN 978-1-921394-67-6
- Yiwarra Kuju The Canning Stock Route Project. National Museum of Australia: Canberra, Australia, 2010. ISBN 978-1-876944-78-0
- Energy Cities. Form: Perth, Australia, 2010. ISBN 978-0-9808691-1-8
- Comparative Capitals. Form: Perth, Australia, 2008. ISBN 978-0-9757274-7-8
- Shifting Foundations, the Collected Papers of the Designing Futures Forum. Craftwest: Perth, Australia, 2003. ISBN 0-9578843-3-8
