= New Formalism (architecture) =

Late modernist style of architecture

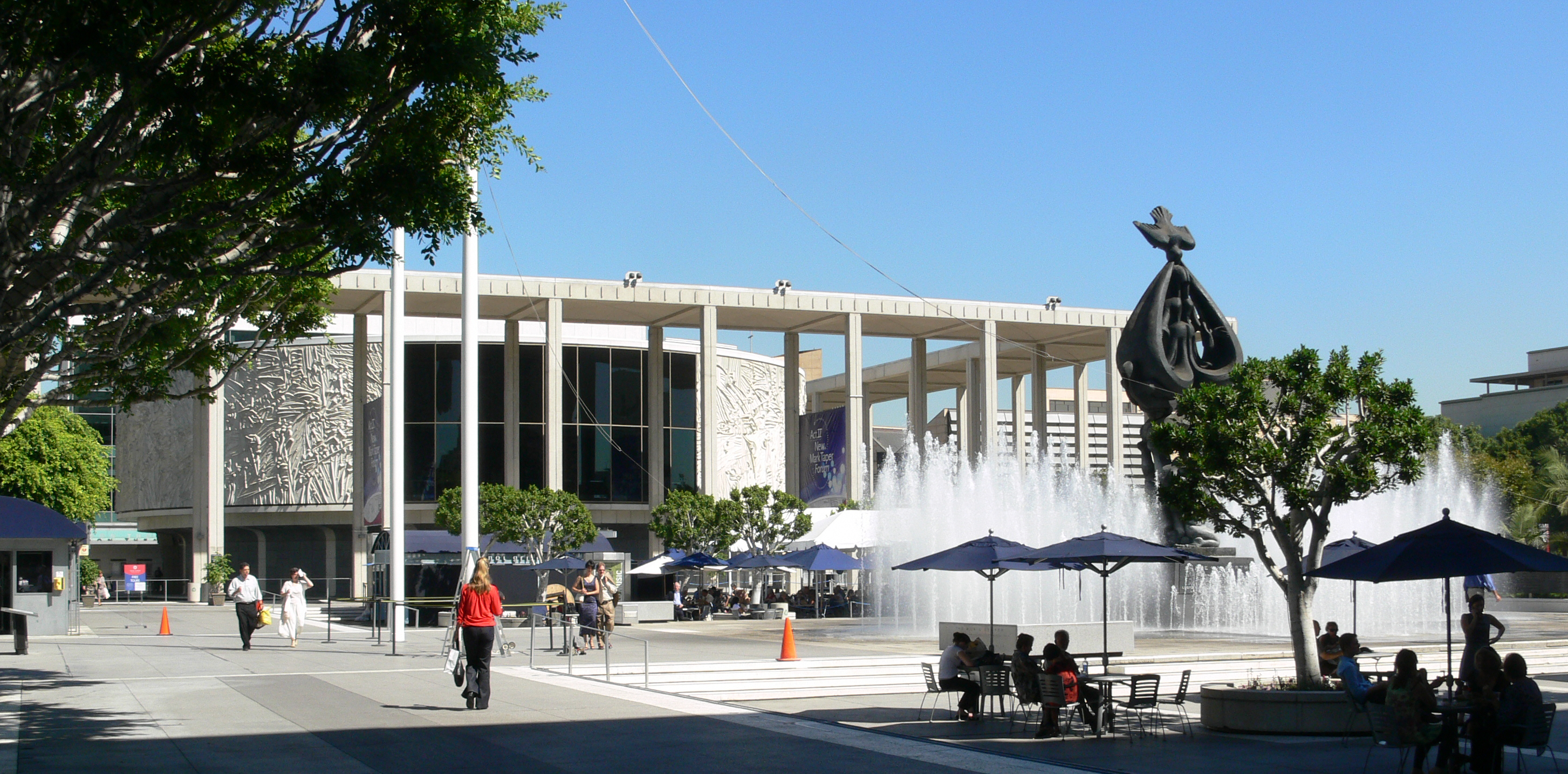
Mark Taper Forum in Los Angeles, California, designed by Welton Becket & Associates (1967)

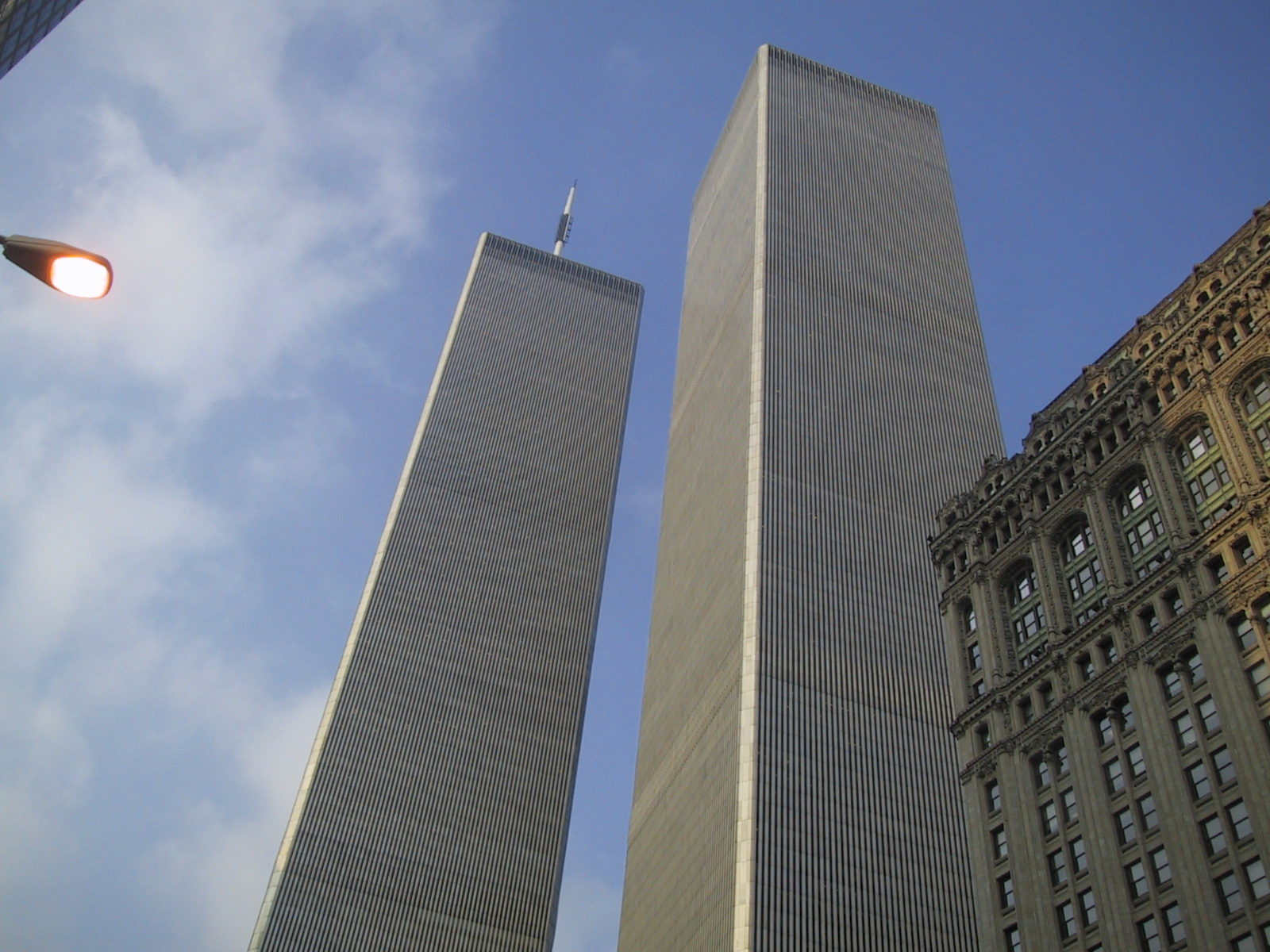
The now destroyed original World Trade Center in New York City, New York, designed by Minoru Yamasaki with Emery Roth & Sons associates (1972–1973).

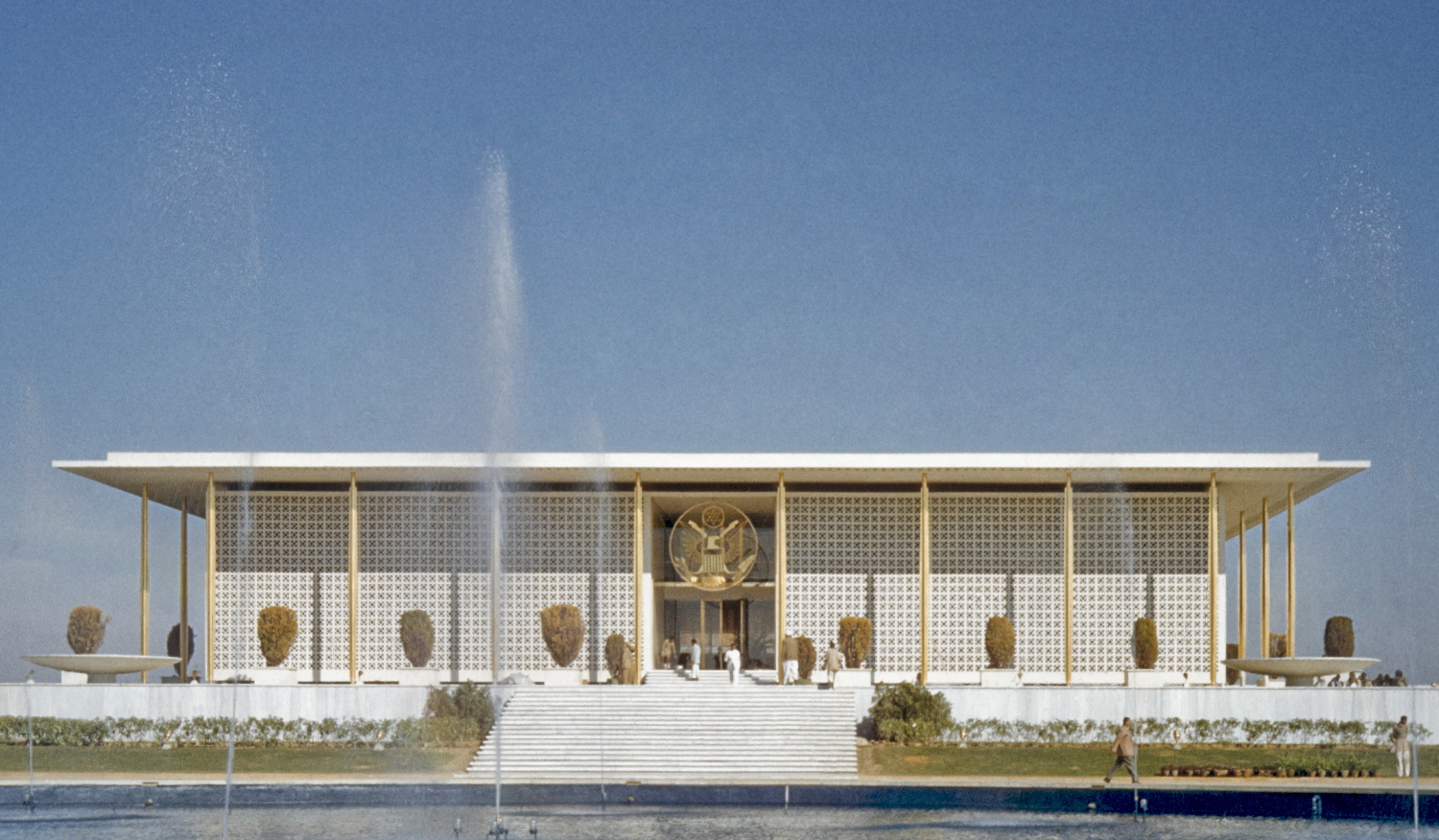
The U.S. Embassy in New Delhi, India, designed by Edward Durell Stone, features a grille wrapping around the building that serves as decoration and a filter for the sun.

New Formalism is an architectural style that emerged in the United States during the mid-1950s and flowered between the 1960s and 1980s. Buildings designed in that style exhibited many Classical elements including "strict symmetrical elevations" building proportion and scale, Classical columns, highly stylized entablatures and colonnades. The style was used primarily for high-profile cultural, high tech, institutional and civic buildings. Edward Durrell Stone's New Delhi American Embassy (1954), which blended the architecture of the east with modern western concepts, is considered to be the symbolic start of New Formalism architecture.

== Origins and principles ==
Common features of the New Formalism style include:

- Use of traditionally rich materials such as travertine, marble, and granite or man-made materials that mimic their luxurious qualities
- Buildings usually set on a podium
- Designed to achieve modern monumentality
- Embraces classical precedents, such as arches, colonnades, classical columns, and entablatures
- Smooth wall surfaces
- Delicacy of details
- Formal landscape: use of pools, fountains, and a sculpture within a central plaza.

Born as a rejection of the rigidity of architectural modernism, New Formalism attempted to wed Classical architectural with concrete's ability to take on fluid, expressive forms to create new shapes such as umbrella shells, waffle slabs and folded plates. Early innovators of this style, such as Edward Durell Stone, believed that International Style's focus on function was not enough and that buildings must put a greater or equal value on aesthetic beauty. In 1958, Stone famously called for a re-examination of classical and ancient artistic traditions in a Time magazine interview in which he stated: "What we need is to put pure beauty into our buildings".

Stone's rejection of the glass facades in favor of arabesque grilles are clear to see in the U.S. Embassy in New Delhi, India, opened in 1959. In addition to grilles or screens instead of glass and exterior walls made of exotic material, New Formalist structures have a carefully organized hierarchy of space, and an emphasis is placed on the structural grid of the building.

== Notable architects ==
- Ellerbe Becket
- Welton Becket
- Gunnar Birkerts
- Moshe Harel
- Philip Johnson
- Friedrich Silaban
- Edward Durell Stone
- Minoru Yamasaki

== Notable examples ==
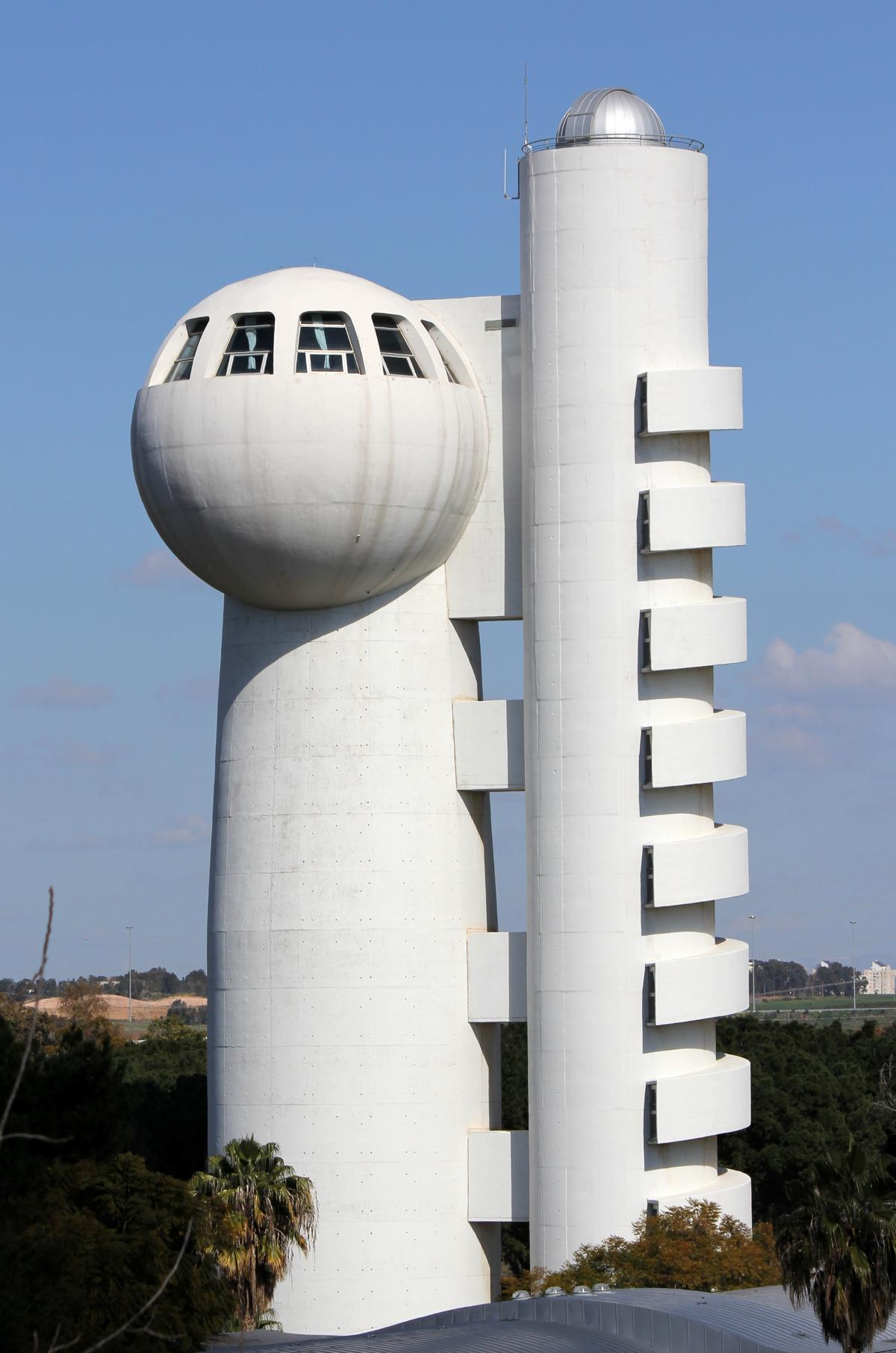
Koffler accelerator at the Weizmann Institute of Science in Rehovot, Israel

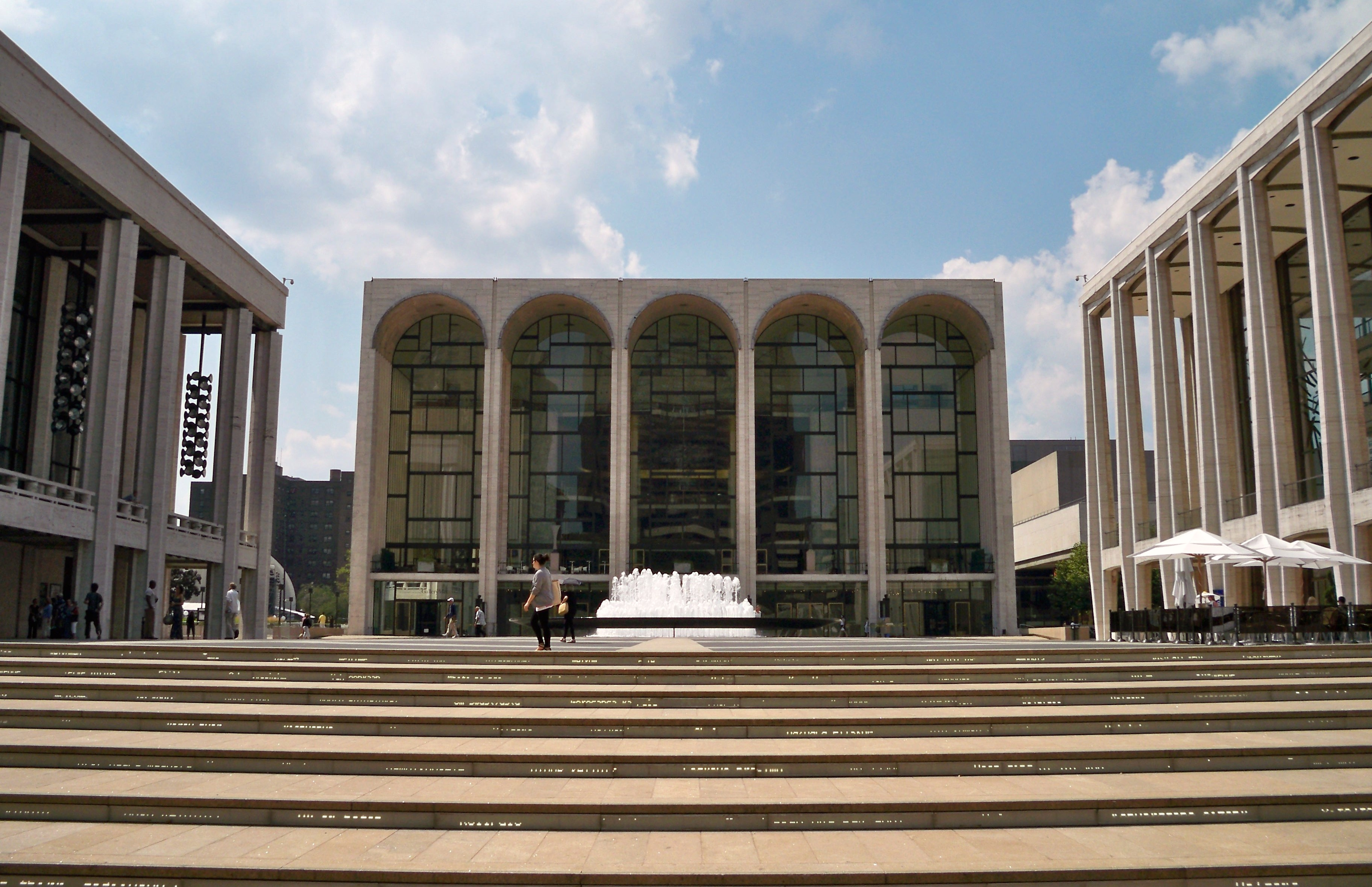
Lincoln Center for the Performing Arts in New York City, U.S.

Istiqlal Mosque in Jakarta, Indonesia

- 2 Columbus Circle, New York City (1964) (remodeled)
- Ahmanson Theatre, Los Angeles, California (1967)
- Beinecke Rare Book & Manuscript Library, New Haven, Connecticut (1963)
- Cambridge Tower, Austin, Texas (1965)
- Dorothy Chandler Pavilion, Los Angeles, California (1964)
- Equitable Building, Los Angeles, California (1969)
- Hollywood Home Savings and Loan, Los Angeles, California (1967)
- Istiqlal Mosque, Jakarta, Indonesia (1978)
- John F. Kennedy Center for the Performing Arts, Washington, D.C. (1971)
- Koffler particle accelerator, Rehovot, Israel (1976)
- Lincoln Center for the Performing Arts, New York City (1962–1969)
- Los Angeles County Museum of Art, Los Angeles, California (1965) (demolished)
- McGregor Memorial Conference Center, Detroit, Michigan (1958)
- Memphis International Airport, Memphis, Tennessee (1963)
- Northwestern National Life Building, Minneapolis, Minnesota (1965)
- Original World Trade Center, Lower Manhattan, New York City (1966) (destroyed)
- Pacific Science Center, Seattle, Washington (1962)
- San Diego Sports Arena (now Pechanga Arena), San Diego, California (1966)
- 1000 Red River St, Austin, Texas (1973) (Formerly the Teacher Retirement System of Texas building)
- The Forum, Inglewood, California (1967)
- Weber County Main Library, Ogden, Utah (1968)
