= Eric =

Male given name

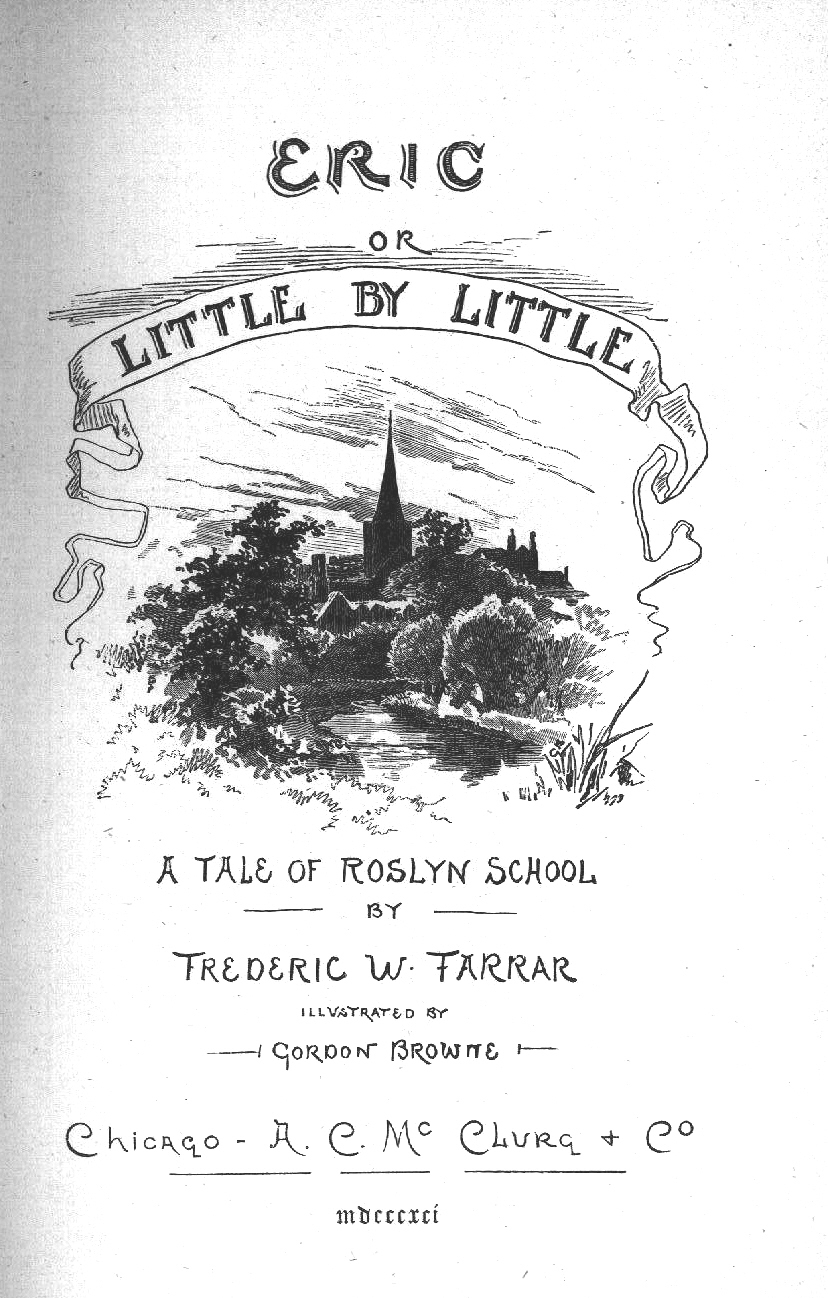
- Title page from 1891 edition of the book Eric, or, Little by Little, whose popularity is credited with increasing the use of the name Eric in Britain
- Pronunciation: English: /ˈɛrɪk/ ERR-ik; French: [eʁik] Romanian: [ˈerik] Erik; Swedish: [ˈêːrɪk] Dutch: [ˈeːrɪk] Erich; German: [ˈeːʁɪç]
- Gender: Male
- Language: North Germanic
- Name day: Sweden & Norway: 18 May

Origin
- Origin: Old Norse
- Meaning: "sole ruler", "eternal ruler"
- Region of origin: Germania

Other names
- Alternative spelling: Erik, Erich, Erick, Erikk, Eirik, Eiríkur, Eiríkr
- Related names: Erickson, Ericsson, Eriksson, Erikson, Eriksen

The male given names Eric, Erich, Erikk, Erik, Erick, Eirik, or Eiríkur are derived from the Old Norse name Eiríkr [ˈɛiˌriːkz̠] (or Eríkr [ˈeˌriːkz̠] in Old East Norse due to monophthongization).

The first element, ei- may be derived from the older Proto-Norse *aina(z), meaning "one, alone, unique", as in the form Æ∆inrikr explicitly, but it could also be from *aiwa(z) "everlasting, eternity", as in the Gothic form Euric. The second element -ríkr stems either from Proto-Germanic *ríks "king, ruler" (cf. Gothic reiks) or the therefrom derived *ríkijaz "kingly, powerful, rich, prince"; from the common Proto-Indo-European root *h₃rḗǵs. The name is thus usually taken to mean "sole ruler, autocrat" or "eternal ruler, ever powerful". Eric used in the sense of a proper noun meaning "one ruler" may be the origin of Eriksgata, and if so it would have meant "one ruler's journey". The tour was the medieval Swedish king's journey, when newly elected, to seek the acceptance of peripheral provinces.

Eric is one of the most commonly used Germanic names in the United States, along with Robert, William, Edward and others.

The most common spelling across Fennoscandia and in the Netherlands is Erik. In Norway, another form of the name (which has kept the Old Norse diphthong) Eirik (Norwegian: [ˈæ̂ɪrɪk]) is also commonly used. The modern Icelandic version is Eiríkur (Icelandic: [ˈeiːˌriːkʏr̥]), while the modern Faroese version is Eirikur.

In Estonia and Finland (where Swedish remains an official minority language), the standard Nordic name form Erik is found, but it may also be spelled phonetically as Eerik (Finnish: [ˈeːrik]), in accordance with Finnic language orthography, along with a slew of other unique Balto-Finnic variant forms including Eerikki, Eero, Erki and Erkki.

Although the name was in use in Anglo-Saxon England, its use was reinforced by Scandinavian settlers arriving before the Norman conquest of England. It was an uncommon name in England until the Middle Ages, when it gained popularity, and finally became a common name in the 19th century. This was partly because of the publishing of the novel Eric, or, Little by Little by Frederic Farrar in 1858.

The Latin form of the name is Euricus or Erīcus (Medieval Latin: [ɛˈriː.kus]), which was also adopted into Old Swedish usage (for example, cf. 15th century Kalmar Swedish historian Ericus Olai). Whence come the Greek forms Ερίκος (Eríkos) or Ερρίκος (Erríkos) (both pronounced [eˈri.kos]), in addition to the direct Nordic borrowing Έρικ (Érik).

Éric (French: [e.ʁik]) is used in French, Erico in Italian, Érico in Portuguese. (Note some phonetically simplified modern forms may be conflated with descendants of cognate name Henry via Henrīcus, Henrik, from Proto-Germanic Haimarīks, sharing the stem *rīks.)

Among Slavic languages, most using the Latin alphabet borrow Erik, but there also exists Polish Eryk. The name is adapted into Cyrillic as Russian Э́йрик (Éyrik) or Э́рик (Érik), and Ukrainian Е́рік (Érik). The Baltic languages use forms such as Latvian Ēriks and Lithuanian Erikas. Meanwhile in Kazakhstan, Ерік (Erik) is used.

And in Germany, Eric, Erik and Erich are used. In South America, the most common spelling is Erick.

In Norway, Sweden and Finland, the name day for derivations of Erik and Eirik is 18 May, commemorating the death of Saint King Eric IX of Sweden, founder of the royal House of Eric.

The feminine derivative is Erica or Erika.

== Royalty ==
=== Danish ===
- Eric I of Denmark, king of Denmark between 1095 and 1103
- Eric II of Denmark, king of Denmark between 1134 and 1137
- Eric III of Denmark, king of Denmark from 1137 until he abdicated in 1146
- Eric IV of Denmark, king of Denmark from 1241 until his murder in 1250
- Eric V of Denmark, son of Christopher I, reigned from 1259 to his murder in 1286
- Eric VI of Denmark, firstborn son of Eric V, reigned from 1286 to 1319
- Eric of Pomerania, ruler of the Kalmar Union between 1396 and 1439

=== Norwegian ===
- Eric I of Norway (Eric Bloodaxe), the second king of Norway
- Eric II of Norway, the king of Norway from 1280 until 1299
- Erik of Pomerania, ruler of the Kalmar Union between 1396 and 1439
- Eiríkr Hákonarson, earl of Lade, ruler of Norway and earl of Northumbria
- Erik the Red, the son of Þorvaldr Ásvaldsson

=== Swedish ===
- Alaric and Eric, two legendary kings of Sweden
- Jorund and Eirik, two legendary kings of Sweden
- Erik Björnsson, one of the sons of Björn Ironside
- Erik Refilsson, Swedish legendary king
- Eric Anundsson, Swedish legendary king who ruled during the 9th century, may be the same as Erik Weatherhat, a more or less mythical Swedish king
- Eric the Victorious, king of the Swedes during the second half of the 10th century
- Eric and Eric, two pretenders around 1066
- Erik Jedvarsson, Swedish king between 1150 and 1160, venerated as a saint
- Erik Knutsson, King of Sweden between 1208 and 1216
- Erik Eriksson, King of Sweden in 1222–1229 and 1234–1250
- Erik Magnusson, rival king of Sweden to his father Magnus Eriksson from 1356 to his death in 1359
- Erik of Pomerania, ruler of the Kalmar Union between 1396 and 1439
- Eric XIV of Sweden, King of Sweden from 1560 until he was deposed in 1568

== Given name ==
=== A–E ===
- Erik (wrestler), stage name for American professional wrestler Raymond Rowe Sr. (born 1984)
- Erik Aadahl (born 1976), American sound editor
- Erik Aaes (1899–1966), Danish set designer and art director
- Eric Abidal (born 1979), French former professional footballer
- Eric Adams, American politician and retired police officer
- Erich Carl Hugo Adamson (1902–1968), Estonian artist
- Eric the Actor, television actor, radio personality
- Eric Adjetey Anang, Ghanaian artist
- Eric Adler (born 2000), American baseball player
- Erik Affholter (born 1966), American football player
- Erik Agard, American crossword solver, constructor, and editor
- Eric Aho (born 1966), American painter
- Eric Albronda (1945–2024), American musician
- Eric Allen (born 1965), American football coach
- Erick Allen (born 1975), Georgia House of Representatives former member
- Eric Alterman (born 1960), American historian, journalist, author, media critic, blogger, and educator
- Eric Ambler (1909–1998), English writer of thrillers and spy novels
- Eric Andersen (born 1943), American singer-songwriter
- Erik Andersen (disambiguation), several people
- Erik Andersson (disambiguation), several people
- Eric Andersen (artist) (born 1940), Danish artist
- Eric Anderson (disambiguation), multiple people
- Eric André, American comedian
- Eric Andrews (1933–2001), Australian historian, academic and author
- Eric Angle (born 1967), American former amateur and professional wrestler
- Eric Arndt (born 1986), American professional wrestler
- Eric Appel (born 1980), American filmmaker
- Eric Ash (1928–2021), British electrical engineer
- Eric Armstrong, American politician
- Eric Arnold, American journalist and author
- Eric Arnold (footballer) (1922–2002), English footballer
- Eric J. Arnould, anthropologist and author
- Eric Ayala (born 1999), Puerto Rican basketball player
- Eric Bana (born 1968), Australian actor
- Eric Banks (American football) (born 1998), American football player
- Eric Wollencott Barnes (1907–1962), American educator, diplomat, actor, and writer
- Eric Bauman, eBaum's World founder
- Eric Bauza (1979–2026), Canadian voice actor
- Eric Bazilian (born 1953), American singer, songwriter, arranger and producer, member of The Hooters
- Erich Beer (born 1946), German footballer
- Eric Beishline, American convicted murderer
- Eric Bell (disambiguation), several people
- Eric Bellinger (born 1984), American singer and songwriter
- Eric Bentley (1916–2020), British-born American theater critic, playwright, singer, editor, and translator
- Eric Benét (born 1966), American singer-songwriter and actor
- Eric Bercovici (1933–2014), American television and film producer and screenwriter
- Eric Berry American football player; Kansas City Chiefs strong safety
- Eric Berry (actor) (1913–1993), British stage and film actor
- Erick Berry (1892–1974), American writer, illustrator and editor
- Eric Bieniemy (born 1969), American football player and coach
- Eric Bischoff (born 1955), American television producer, professional wrestling booker, and performer
- Eric Marlon Bishop, American actor and musician known by the stage name Jamie Foxx
- Eric Arthur Blair, English author known by his pen-name George Orwell
- Eric Blore, English character actor
- Eric Boe (born 1964), United States Air Force fighter pilot Colonel, test pilot, a Civil Air Patrol member, and a NASA astronaut
- Eirik Glambek Bøe, Norwegian musician
- Eric Bolling (born 1963), American news commentator
- Erik Gustaf Boström (1842–1907), Swedish landowner and politician
- Erik Botheim (born 2000), Norwegian footballer
- Erik Bottcher (born 1979), American politician
- Eric Boulter (born 1952), Australian swimmer, athlete, and wheelchair basketball player
- Erik Bulatov (1933–2025), Russian artist
- Eric Butorac (born 1981), American tennis player
- Eric Davin (born 1947), American historian
- Eric DeWayne Boyd (born 1972), American criminal convicted of the kidnapping, rape and murders of Channon Christian and Christopher Newsom
- Eric L. Boyd, American software engineer
- Erik Brahe (1722–1756), Swedish count executed for treason
- Erik Brahe (1552–1614), Swedish governor, councilor and count of Visingsborg
- Erich Brandenberger, German general in the Wehrmacht of Nazi Germany during World War II
- Erik Brann (1950–2003), American singer and guitarist known for Iron Butterfly
- Eric R. Braverman (born 1957), American physician
- Eric Braeden (born 1941), German-born film and television actor
- Erich Brenter (1941–2024), Austrian skibobber
- Eric Brodkowitz, Israeli-American baseball pitcher for the Israel national baseball team
- Eric "Nick" Bravin (born 1971), American Olympic fencer
- Erik Breukink, Dutch racing cyclist
- Eric Brewer (ice hockey), Canadian ice hockey player
- Eric Bruskotter, American actor
- Erik Bryggman (1891–1955), Finnish architect
- Eric Burdon, English vocalist, songwriter and frontman of The Animals
- Erick Cabaco, Uruguayan footballer
- Eric Campbell (disambiguation), several people
- Erik Campbell (born 1966), American gridiron football coach and former player
- Eric Cantona (born 1966), French footballer
- Eric Cantor, American politician
- Érik Canuel (born 1961), Canadian film director and actor
- Eric Carle, children's author
- Eric Carmen (1949–2024), American singer and musician
- Erik Carrasco, Chilean basketball player
- Erick Castillo, Ecuadorian footballer
- Eric Maxim Choupo-Moting, Cameroonian footballer
- Eric Church, American country music singer and songwriter
- Eric Clapton (born 1945), English guitarist, vocalist, and songwriter
- Eric Clay (1922–2007), British rugby league referee
- Eric L. Clay (born 1948), United States circuit judge
- Eric Cobham (c. 1700 – 1760?), British pirate whose existence is disputed
- Erick Brian Colón, singer, member of CNCO
- Erich Consemüller, German Bauhaus-trained architect and photographer
- Erik Cornell (1930–2024), Swedish diplomat
- Eric "Bobo" Correa (born 1968), American percussionist
- Eric Christensen (visual effects supervisor)
- Eric J. Christensen, American astronomer
- Erik Christensen (disambiguation), several people
- Eric Cooke (1931–1964), Australian serial killer
- Eric Crawford (disambiguation), several people
- Erik Craythorne, American politician
- Éric de Cromières (1953–2020), French sports executive
- Eric Czapnik (1958–2009), Polish Ottawa Police Service member
- Eric Dane (1972–2026), American actor
- Erich von Däniken (1935–2026), Swiss author
- Eric Darius (born 1982), American saxophonist, vocalist, songwriter, producer, and educator
- Erik Darling (1933–2008), American songwriter and a folk music artist
- Eric Davidson (survivor) (1915–2009), one of the last survivors of the Halifax Explosion
- Eric H. Davidson (1937–2015), American biologist
- Eric Decker, American football player
- Erik Dekker, Dutch racing cyclist
- Erik Del Bufalo, Venezuelan philosopher
- Erick Delgado, Peruvian footballer
- Erik von Detten (born 1982), former American actor
- Eric Dever, American painter
- Érick Díaz (born 2002), Panamanian footballer
- Eric Dickerson, American football player
- Eric Dier (born 1994), English footballer
- Erik Durm, German footballer
- Eric Easton (1927–1995), English record producer
- Erik Edman, Swedish footballer
- Eric Edwards Jr. (born 2000), American hurdler
- Eric Embry (born 1959), American retired professional wrestler
- Eric Erickson (disambiguation), multiple people
- Erik Erikson, German-born American developmental psychologist
- Eric Erlandson (born 1963), American musician, guitarist, and writer
- Eric Esch, American boxer
- Eric Esrailian, American physician at the David Geffen School of Medicine
- Eric J. Essene (1939–2011), American professor emeritus of geosciences and a metamorphic petrologist
- Erik Estrada, American actor
- Erik Ezelius (born 1986), Swedish politician
- Erik Ezukanma (born 2000), American football player

=== F–L ===
- Erick Farias (born 1997), Brazilian footballer
- Erich von Falkenhayn (1861–1922), Chief of the German General Staff during the First World War
- Eric Felton, American football player
- Eirik Langeland Fjeld (born 1973), Norwegian politician
- Erik Flataker (born 2004), Norwegian footballer
- Eric Foner (born 1943), American historian
- Erik Foss (born 1973), American artist
- Erik Frank, Finnish cyclist
- Eric Franklin (born 1957), Swiss dancer
- Erik Ivar Fredholm, Swedish mathematician
- Eric Frenzel (born 1988), German Nordic combined skier
- Eric Friedler (born 1954), American tennis player
- Eric Fromm (born 1958), American tennis player
- Erich Fromm (1900–1980), German sociologist and writer
- Eric Fructuoso (born 1976), Filipino actor and comedian
- Eric Gale (1938–1994), American jazz and R&B guitarist
- Eric Gales (born 1974), American blues rock guitarist
- Eric Garcetti (born 1971), American politician and diplomat
- Eric Garcia (disambiguation), multiple people
- Eric Gargiulo (born 1972), American wrestling announcer, wrestler, commentator, and radio show host
- Eric Garror (born 2000), American football player
- Eric Gee (1913–1989), British architectural historian
- Eric Gené (born 2007), Spanish racing driver
- Eric Gentry (born 2003), American football player
- Erik Gustaf Geijer, Swedish writer, historian, and composer
- Eric Gilliland, American television producer, writer, actor and whistler
- Eric F. Goldman (1916–1989), American historian
- Erich Gonzales (born 1990), Filipina actress
- Eric Gonzalez (disambiguation), several people
  - Eric Gonzalez (lawyer), American lawyer
  - Eric Gonzalez (musician) (born 1995), Mexican hip hop musician and rapper
- Erik González (born 1991), Dominican baseball player
- Eric Gordon (born 1988), American professional basketball player
- Eric Gorfain, American violinist
- Eirik Granaas (born 2010), Norwegian footballer
- Eric Gray (disambiguation), multiple people
- Erick Green (born 1991), American basketball player
- Eric Gregory (disambiguation), multiple people
- Eric Greitens, American politician, author, and Navy SEAL
- Eric Griffin (basketball) (born 1990), American basketball player
- Eric Griffiths (1940–2005), English musician and dry cleaner
- Eric Griffiths (critic) (1953–2018), British academic and literary critic
- Erik Guay, Canadian alpine skier
- Eric Guggenheim (born 1973), American screenwriter
- Eric Gutierrez, American college baseball coach and former professional baseball first basemen
- Érick Gutiérrez (born 1995), Mexican professional footballer
- Erik Gyselinck (born 1945), Belgian long-distance runner
- Eric Hacker, American professional baseball pitcher
- Erick Hallett (born 2000), American football player
- Erik Hamrén, Swedish football coach
- Eric Harper, New Zealand sportsman
- Eric Harris (disambiguation), multiple people
- Erich Hartmann, German WWII fighter ace
- Eric A. Havelock, British classicist
- Eric Hayes, British soldier
- Eric Hayes (American football), American football player
- Eric Heiden, American speed skater
- Erik Heinrichs, Finnish general
- Eric Hill, English author and illustrator
- Eric Himelfarb, Canadian ice hockey player
- Eric Hiscock (1908–1986), British sailor and author
- Eric Hoffer (1902–1983), American moral and social philosopher
- Eric Holcomb, American politician
- Erich Holder (1901–1974), German film producer
- Eric Holle, American football player
- Eric Holmback (1916–1965), American professional wrestler, also known by ring name Yukon Eric
- Eric Holtz (born 1965), American Head Coach of the Israel national baseball team
- Erich Honecker, (1922–1993), East German leader
- Eric Hosmer, American baseball player
- Erick Hunter (born 2003), American football player
- Eric Hutchinson, American singer-songwriter
- Eric Idle, English comedian, actor, author, singer, writer, and comedic composer
- Eric Jacobson, American puppeteer
- Eric Jarvis (1907–1987), Rhodesian lawyer and judge
- Erik Flensted-Jensen (1908–1993), founder and leader of the Danish Gym Team
- Eric Jensen (racing driver) (born 1970), Canadian race team owner and race car driver
- Erik Jensen (disambiguation), multiple people
- Eirik Jensen, Norwegian former policeman turned criminal
- Eric Johnson, American guitarist and recording artist
- Erik Johnson, American hockey player
- Erik Jorpes, Finnish-born Swedish physician and biochemist
- Eric Jungmann (born 1981), American actor
- Eric Kandel (born 1929), Austrian-American physician and Nobel Prize laureate
- Erik Axel Karlfeldt, Swedish Nobel Prize winning poet
- Erik Karlsson, Swedish hockey player
- Erich Kästner, (1899–1974), German author, poet, screenwriter and satirist
- Erik Keedus, Estonian basketball player
- Erik Johan Gustaf af Klint (1816–1866), Swedish naval officer and murder victim
- Erich Klostermann (1870–1963), German New Testament scholar
- Eric Kraft (born 1944), American author
- Eric Kripke (born 1974), American writer and television producer
- Erik Kromann (born 1946), Danish author
- Erich Kulas (1979 – 2002), American professional wrestling fan involved in the Mass Transit incident
- Eric Kwok, Hong Kong singer-songwriter
- Erik Kynard, American high jumper
- Eriq La Salle, American actor and director
- Eric Laithwaite (1921-1997), English scientist and engineer
- Erik Lamela, Argentine footballer
- Eric Laneuville (born 1952), American television director, producer and actor
- Eric Lange, American actor
- Eric Larson, American animator for the Walt Disney Studios starting in 1933 and one of the "Disney's Nine Old Men"
- Erik Laxmann, Russian explorer of Swedish origin
- Eric Lefkofsky (born 1969), American billionaire businessman
- Eric LeGrand (born 1990), American former football defensive tackle
- Eric L. Levinson, American jurist and lawyer
- Eric Liddell, Scottish athlete, rugby union international player, and missionary
- Eric Lindell, American singer-songwriter
- Eric Lindros, hockey player
- Eric Lively (born 1981), American actor
- Eric Lloyd (born 1986), American actor
- Eric Lloyd (politician) (1918–2003), Australian real estate agent
- Eric Lombers (1914–1978), British poster artist
- Eric Longfield Lloyd (1890–1957), Australian army officer, public servant, and diplomat
- Erik Lorig (born 1986), American football player
- Erich Ludendorff, German general in World War I
- Eric Van Lustbader (born 1946), American author of thriller and fantasy novels

=== M–Z ===
- Eric Mabius, American actor
- Erich von Manstein, German field marshal
- Eric Martsolf, American actor
- Erik Mariñelarena, Mexican screenwriter, director and producer
- Eric Maskin, American economist and Nobel prize laureate
- Eric Maturin (1883–1957), British actor
- Eric Mays (1958–2024), American politician
- Eric McCormack (disambiguation), several people
- Erik McCoy (born 1997), American football player
- Erick McIntosh, American football player
- Erik Messerschmidt, American cinematographer
- Eric Milroy (1887–1916), Scottish rugby union player
- Eric Minkin (born 1950), American-Israeli basketball player
- Erik Mongrain, Canadian composer and guitarist
- Eric Montross (1971–2023), American professional basketball player
- Eric Manchester (1964–2023), American actor and model
- Eric Moon, English Librarian
- Eric Morecambe, English comedian
- Erich Muenter (1871–1915), German-American political terrorist, activist, spy, professor and would-be assassin
- Erich Muhsfeldt, German SS officer at Auschwitz and Majdanek concentration camps executed for war crimes
- Eric Mun (born 1979), South Korean rapper, songwriter and actor
- Eric Nam, a Korean American singer-songwriter, entertainer and television presenter
- Eric Naposki (born 1966), American convicted murderer and former football player
- Erik Ňarjaš (born 1985), Slovak dancer and politician
- Eric Nazarian, Armenian-American film director and screenwriter
- Eric Nenno (1961–2008), American sex offender
- Erick Neres da Cruz, Brazilian footballer
- Eric Nicksick (born 1979), American mixed martial artist
- Erik Nielsen (disambiguation), several people
- Erik Nielson (academic), academic and expert in the use of rap music as evidence in criminal trials
- Erik Nielson (footballer) (born 1996), Cape Verdean footballer
- Eric Nkansah, Ghanaian sprinter
- Erik Nordström, multiple people
- Eric Nystrom (born 1983), American hockey player
- Eric O'Dell (born 1990), Canadian professional ice hockey player
- Eric Olson (disambiguation), multiple people
- Eric O'Neill (born 1973), American security consultant and former FBI counter-espionage operative
- Eric O'Neill (American football) (born 2003), American football player
- Eric Oncins, Brazilian professional pickleball player
- Eric Osborn (1922–2007), Australian theologian
- Eric Owens (bass-baritone), American opera singer
- Eric Palangas (1966–2015), American politician
- Erik Palladino, American actor
- Eric Pardinho, Brazilian professional baseball player
- Eric Parker (American football), American football player
- Erik Peters, Canadian accountant
- Eric Peterson, Canadian actor
- Erik Peterson (theologian) (1890–1960), German theologian
- Eric Pierpoint, American actor
- Eric Pinkins, American football player
- Eric Pohlmann (1913–1979), Austrian theatre, film and television character actor
- Eric Pollard (skier), American freeskier
- Eric Pollard, American musician who records as Actual Wolf
- Eric Poole (disambiguation), several people
- Eric Pop (born 1975), Romanian engineer and professor
- Eric Prydz, Swedish disc jockey and producer
- Erick Pulgar, Chilean footballer
- Eric Quizon (born 1967), Filipino actor and director
- Eric Radford (born 1985), Canadian pair skater
- Eric Ravotti, American football player
- Erich Redman (1964–2025), Russian-born German actor
- Erich Maria Remarque (1898–1970), German writer (All Quiet on the Western Front)
- Erik Resell (born 1996), Norwegian cyclist
- Erik Rhodes (actor, born 1906), American film and Broadway actor
- Erich Ribbeck (born 1937), German footballer and coach
- Erik Rico, American musician, singer, songwriter, producer, and DJ
- Éric Ripert, chef and co-owner of the New York restaurant, Le Bernardin
- Eric Rivers, American football player
- Eric Roberts, American actor
- Eric Rosswood, American activist
- Erich Roth (1910–1947), Nazi Gestapo member executed for war crimes
- Eric Rubin, American microbiologist and infectious disease specialist
- Erich Rudorffer (1917–2016), German Luftwaffe fighter ace
- Eric Saade, Swedish singer/songwriter
- Eric Saarinen (born 1942), Finnish American cinematographer and film director
- Erik Salumäe (born 1970), Estonian politician
- Erik Santos (born 1982), Filipino singer
- Erik Satie, French composer
- Eric Saubert (born 1994), American football player
- Eric Sbraccia (born 1968), American retired professional wrestler
- Eric Schleien, American politician
- Eric Schmidt, billionaire executive chairman of Google
- Erik Schmidt (painter), Estonian painter
- Eric Scott (disambiguation), multiple people
- Erick Sermon (born 1968), American rapper and producer
- Eric Sevareid, American journalist
- Eric Shinseki (born 1942), United States retired Army general
- Eric Singer, American hard rock and heavy metal drummer, best known as a member of Kiss
- Eric Singleton Jr., American football player
- Erik Carlsson Sjöblad (1647-1725), Swedish governor, admiral, and baron
- Erik Solbakken (born 1984), Norwegian television presenter
- Erik Sowinski (born 1989), American middle-distance runner
- Erik Spoelstra (born 1970), Filipino-American professional basketball coach
- Éric St-Pierre, Canadian politician
- Eric Staal (born 1984), Canadian hockey player
- Erick Stakelbeck (born 1976), American author and television host
- Eric Stanley (violinist), American violinist and composer
- Eric Stanton (1926–1999), American underground cartoonist and fetish art pioneer
- Eric Starczala (born 1996), Canadian football player
- Eric Steele (born 1954), English football player and coach
- Eric Stehr (born 2001), German politician
- Eric Still (born 1967), American football player
- Eric Stokes (disambiguation), multiple people
- Eric Stoltz, American actor, director and producer
- Eric Stults (born 1979), American former professional baseball pitcher
- Eric Swalwell (born 1980), American lawyer and politician
- Erik Swanson (born 1993), American baseball player
- Erik von Sydow (1912–1997), Swedish diplomat
- Eric Sykes, English radio, television and film writer, actor and director
- Éric Tabarly (1931–1998), French Navy officer and yachtsman
- Erik Tennander (1919–2007), Swedish diplomat
- Eric Thomas (disambiguation), multiple people
- Eric Thorne (1862–1922), English singer and actor
- Eric Justin Toth (born 1982), American former fugitive
- Erick Thohir, Indonesian businessman and entrepreneur
- Erik Tomáš (born 1975), Slovak politician
- Eric Trolle (c. 1460–1530), regent of Sweden in 1512
- Eric Trolle (1863–1934), Swedish diplomat
- Eric Tsang, Hong Kong film actor, producer and director
- Eric Turner (disambiguation), several people
- Erik Valdez, American actor
- Eric Vale, voice actor and script writer
- Erik van der Maas (born 1968), Dutch politician
- Erik Verlinde, Dutch theoretical physicist
- Erik De Vlaeminck, Belgian racing cyclist
- Erick Silva, Brazilian mixed martial artist
- Erick Wainaina, Kenyan long-distance runner
- Erich Wasicky, German SS pharmacist at Mauthausen concentration camp in charge of gassing victims and was executed
- Eric Watts (born 2000), American football player
- Erik Watts (born 1967), American semi-retired professional wrestler
- Harry Houdini (born Erik Weisz; 1874–1926), Hungarian escapologist and stuntman
- Eric Welsh, intelligence officer
- Eric Wennström, Swedish hurdler
- Eric Whitacre, composer and conductor
- Erik White, American director
- Erik White (Canadian football), Canadian football player
- E. B. Wikramanayake, Sri Lankan Sinhala politician and lawyer
- Eric Wikramanayake, Sri Lankan Sinhala conservationist
- Eric Wilborts (born 1964), Dutch former professional tennis player
- Eric Wilkerson, American football player
- Erik Adolf von Willebrand, Finnish internist (von Willebrand disease)
- Eric Charles Twelves Wilson (1912–2008), English British Army officer and colonial administrator
- Eric Winstanley (1944–2021), English footballer
- Eric Winters (1921–1968), English sculptor
- Eric Winters (American football) (born 2006), American football player
- Eric Wisely (born 1984), American professional mixed martial artist
- Erik Wisén (1889–1978), Swedish diplomat
- Eric Woolfson (1945–2009), Scottish songwriter, musician and executive producer
- Eric Lynn Wright, American rapper known as Eazy-E (1964–1995)
- Eric Yap (born 1979), Filipino politician
- Eric Young (disambiguation), multiple people
- Eric Yuan (born 1969/70), American billionaire, founder and CEO of Zoom Video Communications
- Erik Zabel (born 1970), German cyclist
- Éric Zemmour (born 1958), French far-right politician, essayist, writer and former political journalist and pundit
- Eric Zinterhofer (born 1971), American private equity financier
- Erik de Zwart, Dutch radio and television maker

== Fictional characters ==
- Erik, the titular character in Gaston Leroux's 1910 novel The Phantom of the Opera
- Flat Eric, low-tech, yellow puppet character from Levi's commercials for Sta-Prest One Crease Denim Clothing
- Eric Brooks, also known as Blade in the Marvel Universe
  - Blade (New Line Blade franchise character)
  - Blade (Marvel Cinematic Universe)
- Eric Cartman, one of the four main characters in the TV series South Park
- Erick Erickssong, fictional character
- Eric Foreman, major character from the TV series House M.D.
- Eric Forman (That '70s Show), the main character in That '70s Show
- Eric Hinkle, character from the fantasy book The Secrets of Droon
- General Erich Von Klinkerhoffen, the boss of Colonel Kurt Von Strohm, Captain Alberto Bertorelli, Captain Hans Geering and Lieutenant Hubert Gruber in the TV series 'Allo 'Allo!
- Eric McGowen, a character in the 1994 American martial arts drama movie The Next Karate Kid
- Eric Murphy, fictional character on the comedy-drama television series Entourage
- Eric Northman, the love interest of Sookie Stackhouse in the Southern Vampire Mysteries novels and the TV series True Blood
- Eric Draven, the undead avenger of his and his fiancée's murder in the movie The Crow
- Erik Von Darkmoor, fictional character appearing in the novels of Raymond E. Feist
- Erik Lehnsherr, also known as Magneto in the Marvel Universe
- Eric Matthews, a main character from the TV series Boy Meets World and its spinoff Girl Meets World
- Eric Myers, a character in Power Rangers Time Force
- Erik Pinksterblom, the main character in Erik of het klein insectenboek
- Eric Pollard, character on the British soap opera Emmerdale
- Eric Praline, a recurring character in the television show Monty Python's Flying Circus
- Eric the Half-a-Bee, a Monty Python sketch and song
- Erik "Killmonger" Stevens, a Marvel Comics supervillain and the main antagonist of Black Panther
- Eric Thursley, a thirteen-year-old demonologist and the titular character of the Discworld novel Eric
- Eric van der Woodsen, Gossip Girl character
- Prince Eric, the love interest of Princess Ariel in the Disney movie, The Little Mermaid

== Surname ==
- Micheal Eric (born 1988), Nigerian basketball player

== See also ==
- Arik
- Aric
- Éric
- Euric
- Frederick (given name)
