= Eryk =

Polish male given name

- Pronunciation: Polish: [ɛrɨk]
- Gender: Male
- Language: Polish
- Name day: 18 May

Origin
- Region of origin: Poland

Other names
- Related names: Erik, Eerik, Erich

Eryk is a given name. It is the Polish form of the name Erik. Notable people with the name include:

- Eryk Anders (born 1987), American mixed martial artist
- Eryk Goczał (born 2004), Polish rally driver
- Eryk Hansel (born 1941), Polish footballer
- Eryk Kobza (born 2001), Canadian soccer player
- Eryk Kowalczyk (born 1989), known as Xilent, Polish musician
- Eryk Kulm (born 1990), Polish actor
- Eryk Kurnatowski (1883-1975), Polish nobleman and politician
- Eryk Latoń (born 1993), Polish racing cyclist
- Eryk Lipiński (1908-1991), Polish artist
- Eryk Rocha (born 1978), Brazilian film director
- Eryk Williamson (born 1997), American footballer
- Eryk Żelazny (born 1943), Polish runner
