= Erik Olsson =

Erik Olsson may refer to:

- Erik Olsson (footballer)
- Erik Olsson (wrestler)

== See also ==
- Erik Olson, Swedish artist
- Erik Olson (American football)
- Eric Olson (disambiguation)
