= Ēriks =

Male given name

- Gender: Male
- Language: Latvian
- Name day: 18 May

Origin
- Origin: Old Norse
- Meaning: Eternal ruler
- Region of origin: Latvia

Other names
- Derived: Eric

Ēriks is a Latvian masculine given name, which is the cognate of the given name Eric, meaning "eternal ruler". The name may refer to:

- Ēriks Ešenvalds (born 1977), Latvian composer
- Ēriks Grigjans (born 1964), Latvian footballer
- Ēriks Koņeckis (1920–2006), Latvian ice hockey player
- Ēriks Mesters (1926–2009), Latvian theologian and archbishop
- Ēriks Pelcis (born 1978), Latvian footballer
- Ēriks Pētersons (1909–1987), Latvian footballer and ice-hockey player
- Ēriks Rags (born 1975), Latvian javelin thrower
- Ēriks Raisters (1913–1942), Latvian footballer
- Ēriks Ševčenko (born 1991), Latvian ice hockey player
- Ēriks Vanags (1892–2001), Latvian track and field athlete
