= Éric =

Éric ['eʁik] is a French masculine given name, the equivalent of English Eric. In French-speaking Canada and Belgium it is also sometimes unaccented, and pronounced "Eric" as English with the stress on the "i". A notable French exception is Erik Satie, born Éric, but who in later life signed his name "Erik" pronounced as in English.

As with Étienne, Émile, Édouard, Élisabeth, Édith the accent É is sometimes omitted in older printed sources, though French orthography is to include accents on capitals.

== People named Éric ==
- Éric Abidal (b. 1979) French footballer
- Éric Antoine (b. 1976) French comedy magician
- Éric Bourdon (b. 1979) French painter
- Éric Cantona (b. 1966) French footballer, known as "Eric Cantona" as an actor
- Éric Elmosnino (b. 1964) French actor and musician
- Éric Fottorino (b. 1960) French journalist and author
- Éric Geoffroy (b. 1956) French philosopher, islamologist and writer
- Éric Guirado (b. 1968) French film director and writer
- Éric Martineau (b.1968) French politician
- Éric Pichet (b. 1960) French economist
- Éric Rohmer (1920–2010) French film director
- Éric Serra (b. 1959) French film composer
- Éric Tabarly (1931–1998) French yachtsman
- Éric Troncy (b. 1965) French curator and art critic
- Éric Valli (b. 1952) French photographer and film director.
- Éric Vigner (b. 1960) French stage director,
- Éric Woerth (b. 1956) French politician
- Éric Zemmour (b. 1958) French political journalist
- Éric-Emmanuel Schmitt (b. 1960) French-Belgian dramatist, novelist and fiction writer

=== Érik (variant) ===
- Érik Boisse (b. 1980) French fencer

== See also ==
- Eric
- Erik
