= Stehr =

Stehr is a surname. Notable people with the name include:

- Eric Stehr (born 2001), German politician
- Hagen Stehr (born 1941), Australian multi-millionaire businessman and tuna fisherman
- John Stehr (born 1958), American television journalist
- Joanne Stehr, American politician
- Nico Stehr (born 1942), German professor for Cultural Studies
- Hermann Stehr (1864–1940), German novelist, dramatist and poet
- Thomas Stehr (born 1952), Canadian bobsledder
- Dennis Princewell Stehr (born 1984), known professionally as Mr. Probz, Dutch record producer, singer and rapper
- Ray Stehr (1913–1983), Australian rugby league footballer
