= Eric Christensen =

Eric Christensen may refer to:

- Eric Christensen (visual effects supervisor) (born 1969)
- Eric J. Christensen, American astronomer

== See also ==
- Erik Christensen (disambiguation)
