= Erik Nielson =

Erik Nielson may refer to:

- Erik Nielson (academic), academic and expert in the use of rap music as evidence in criminal trials
- Erik Nielson (footballer) (born 1996), Cape Verdean footballer

== See also ==
- Erik Nielsen (disambiguation)
