= Harold Siddons =

Northern Irish actor (1922–1963)

Publicity still of Siddons in Gift Horse (1952), by photographer Eric Gray

William Harold Henry Siddons (17 September 1922 – 4 November 1963) was a British film and television actor, appearing in Genevieve, The Dam Busters, Appointment in London, They Who Dare, The Purple Plain, Quatermass and the Pit, A Night To Remember and The Wrong Arm of the Law. He served in Bomber Command during the Second World War as a flight engineer, latterly with 582 Squadron as the Flight Engineer Leader on its formation in April 1944 and was a descendant of Sarah Siddons. His decorations included the Distinguished Flying Cross, awarded in January 1944.

Born in Belfast, Northern Ireland, on 17 September 1922, he was found dead in his car on 4 November 1963 aged 41, apparently by suicide. He was buried in the parish churchyard of Little Gaddesden, Hertfordshire, with the motto Per ardua ad astra on his gravestone.

== Selected filmography ==
- Angels One Five (1952) - Pimpernel Pilot
- Gift Horse (1952) - Ship's Doctor
- Appointment in London (1953) - Saunders
- Genevieve (1953) - Policeman (uncredited)
- Malta Story (1953) - Matthews, Bomber Pilot (uncredited)
- The Clue of the Missing Ape (1953) - Naval Intelligence Officer (uncredited)
- They Who Dare (1954) - Lieut. Stevens R.N.
- The Good Die Young (1954) - Hospital Doctor (uncredited)
- Conflict of Wings (1954) - Flight Lt. Edwards
- The Purple Plain (1954) - Navigator Williams (uncredited)
- The Dam Busters (1955) - Group Signals Officer
- I Am a Camera (1955) - Editor at Party
- The Blue Peter (1955) - Hughes
- The Baby and the Battleship (1956) - Whiskers
- The Last Man to Hang? (1956) - Cheed's Doctor
- Man in the Shadow (1957) - Colin Wells
- The Mark of the Hawk (1957) - 1st Officer
- The Silent Enemy (1958) - Army Interrogation Officer
- Dunkirk (1958) - Doctor (uncredited)
- A Night to Remember (1958) - Second Officer Herbert Stone - Californian
- Battle of the V-1 (1958) - Master Bomber
- Harry Black (1958) - British Officer
- Danger Within (1959) - Capt. 'Tag' Burchnall
- The White Trap (1959) - Harry (uncredited)
- The Guns of Navarone (1961) - British Officer (uncredited)
- The Man in the Back Seat (1961) - Angry Resident (uncredited)
- Out of the Shadow (1961) - Newspaper Editor
- The Piper's Tune (1962) - Sergeant
- The Wrong Arm of the Law (1963) - PC in Basement Garage (uncredited)
