= Salumäe (surname) =

Family name

Salumäe is an Estonian surname. Notable people with the surname include:

- Erik Salumäe (born 1970), Estonian politician
- Erika Salumäe (born 1962), Estonian track bicycle racer and Olympic gold medalist
- Jane Salumäe (born 1968), Estonian long-distance runner and Olympic competitor
- Jens Salumäe (born 1981), Estonian ski jumper and Nordic combined skier and Olympic competitor
- Priit Salumäe (born 1967), Estonian cyclist
- Tiit Salumäe (born 1951), Estonian Lutheran prelate
