= Eric Bell (disambiguation) =

Eric Bell (born 1947) is an Irish musician; lead guitarist for Thin Lizzy.

Eric Bell may also refer to:

- Eric Temple Bell (1883–1960), Scottish author and mathematician
- Eric Norman Frankland Bell (1895–1916), Irish recipient of the Victoria Cross
- Eric Bell (baseball) (born 1963), American baseball player
- Eric Bell (footballer, born 1929) (1929–2012), English football player
- Eric Bell (footballer, born 1922) (1922–2004), English footballer
- Eric Bell II, American politician from Georgia
- Eric Allen Bell (born 1973), American documentary film writer and director
- Rico Bell (a.k.a. Eric Bellis), English artist and musician
