= Eric Gray =

Eric Gray may refer to:

- Eric Gray (American football) (born 1999), American football player
- Eric Gray (photographer), British photographer
- Eric Gray (politician), American politician

== See also ==
- Eric Grey (1895–1977), New Zealand rugby league player
