= Journal of the Academy of Marketing Science =

- Discipline: Marketing
- Language: English
- Edited by: Charles H. Noble, Stephanie M. Noble

Publication details
- History: 1973-present
- Publisher: Springer Science+Business Media
- Frequency: Bimonthly
- Impact factor: 10.1 (2024)

Standard abbreviations
- ISO 4: J. Acad. Mark. Sci.

Indexing
- ISSN: 0092-0703 (print); 1552-7824 (web)
- LCCN: 73646342
- OCLC no.: 1788738

Links
- Journal homepage; Online access; Online archive

The Journal of the Academy of Marketing Science is a bimonthly peer-reviewed academic journal of Academy of Marketing Science (AMS). Since June 2024, Stephanie M. Noble and Charles H. Noble (both University of Tennessee) serve as joint editors-in-chief. In 2010, the journal changed publication frequency from quarterly to bimonthly.

According to the Journal Citation Reports, the journal has a 2024 impact factor of 10.1.

Every year, the journal presents an annual Best Paper Award and a Long-Term Impact Award named after Jagdish Sheth and A. Parasuraman.

== Previous editors ==
The following persons have been editors-in-chief of the journal:

- 2018–2024: John Hulland, University of Georgia
- 2015–2018: Robert W. Palmatier, University of Washington
- 2009–2015: G. Tomas M. Hult, Michigan State University
- 2006–2009: David W. Stewart, Loyola Marymount University
- 2003–2006: George Zinkhan, University of Georgia
- 2000–2003: P. Rajan Varadarajan, Texas A&M University
- 1997–2000: A. Parasuraman, University of Miami
- 1994–1997: David Cravens, Texas Christian University
- 1991–1994: Robert Peterson, University of Texas at Austin
- 1988–1991: William Darden, Louisiana State University
- 1984–1988: Irene Lange, California State University at Fullerton
- 1982–1984: Paul Hertz, University of Miami
- 1972–1982: Jane Fenyo, Long Island University
