= Eric Andersen (disambiguation) =

Eric Andersen (born 1943) is an American folk music singer-songwriter.

Eric Andersen may also refer to:

- Eric Andersen (footballer) (1904–1977), Australian rules footballer
- Eric Andersen (artist) (born 1940), Danish artist

== See also ==
- Eric Anderson (disambiguation)
- Erik Andersen (disambiguation)
