= The Clue of the Missing Ape =

1953 film by James Hill

- Opening titles
- Directed by: James Hill
- Written by: James Hill
- Produced by: Frank Wells
- Starring: George Cole, Roy Savage
- Edited by: Arthur Stevens
- Music by: Jack Beaver
- Production company: Gaumont Specialised Film Unit
- Release date: 1953
- Running time: 58 minutes
- Country: United Kingdom

The Clue of the Missing Ape (also known as Gibraltar Adventure and Apes on the Rock) is a 1953 British children's film directed by James Hill and starring George Cole and Roy Savage. Largely set in Gibraltar, it was produced by the Gaumont Specialised Film Unit, a descendant of the Gaumont-British film studio.

== Plot ==
The film centres on the adventures of Sea Cadet Jimmy Sutton. Sutton is seen walking down an English country path, and the sound of a boy's cheerful whistling is dubbed onto the soundtrack. Soon a misfiring propeller engine is also heard and a World War II-style plane crashes in a field. Sutton heroically rescues the pilot and retrieves a portfolio of important papers as the plane erupts in flames. Two suspicious men can be seen sneaking away, trading dialogue that indicates they have sabotaged the plane.

The scene shifts to Gibraltar, where Sutton has been granted the right to enjoy a short vacation, courtesy of the British armed forces, as a reward for his bravery. New challenges arise. One of the first things that the garrison shows to Sutton are some of the Gibraltar apes, feral primates that have become the totemic animals of the armed forces base. The local folklore is that if the animals ever die or disappear, Gibraltar will fall to Britain's enemies. Young Jimmy soon finds that someone is indeed killing the primates.

With the help of a new friend, young local girl Pilar Ellis, Jimmy tries to save the 'apes' and wake the authorities up to the threat they face. It soon becomes clear that the cruelty to animals is only part of a much larger impending terrorist strike against the strategic naval base of Gibraltar. The deaths of the monkeys are meant to serve as a feint to distract the Royal Navy from the imminent reality that the capital ships stationed at the base will be damaged or sunk by limpet mines that will be attached by skilled frogmen.

Sutton and Ellis have the task of saving Gibraltar from this sinister attack. A series of chase scenes includes many of the key sights of Gibraltar as they existed in 1953, including the fortified spine of the Rock of Gibraltar and the Gibraltar water catchments.

With the last-minute help of adults, the terrorist plot is foiled and the Royal Navy is saved. The film's closing credits scroll to the accompaniment of Rule Britannia.

== Cast ==
- George Cole as Gobo
- Patrick Boxill as Mr Palmer
- William Patrick as Lieutenant-Commander Collier
- Nati Banda as Pilar Ellis
- Sea Cadet Roy Savage as Jimmy Sutton
- Marcus Simpson as Petty Officer Ellis
- John Ocello as Matty
- Peter Copley as His Excellency
- Bill Shine as crony
- Evelyn Roberts as Rear Admiral McCormack
- Harold Siddons as naval intelligence officer
- John Welsh as army intelligence officer
- Julian Somers as R.A.F. intelligence officer
- William Walter as Rear Admiral Vinson
- Luis Ellul as Luis, the orange boy
- Carla Challoner as little girl

== Critical reception ==
The Monthly Film Bulletin wrote: "This film is a prolonged chase, in which the director fully uses the potentialities of the unique terrain of Gibraltar. Conversations with obtuse adults retard the pace here and there, but the children are soon off again, clattering down hair-raising gradients, acting as decoy, drifting across the bay in a lifeboat. The puny crook, with his local confederate, may seem inadequate to his ambitious devilry, while the virtuous adults – Officers of the Fleet – are stiff, indistinguishable bores; but such minor flaws are heavily outweighed by the general high standard of the direction and the vivacity and intelligent performances of the children. Nati Banda is a particularly sensitive and attractive performer."
