= Eric McCormack (disambiguation) =

Eric McCormack (born 1963) is a Canadian-born American actor and singer.

Eric McCormack may also refer to:

- Eric McCormack (writer) (born 1938), Scottish-born Canadian author and writer
- Eric McCormack (rugby league) (1905–1997), Australian rugby league footballer

== See also ==
- Eric, a list of people with the given name
- McCormack, a list of people with the surname
