= Eric Erickson =

Eric Erickson, Erik Eriksson, or similar names may refer to:

== Politicians and royals ==
- Erick Erickson (born 1975), American conservative politician, blogger, and radio commentator
- Erik Eriksson (1216–1250), King of Sweden
- Erik A. Eriksson (born 1969), Swedish politician
- Erik Eriksen (1902–1972), prime minister of Denmark

== Sports ==
- Carl-Erik Eriksson (born 1930), Swedish bobsledder
- Eric Erickson (baseball) (1892–1965), Swedish Major League pitcher
- Erik Eriksson (athlete) (1897–1975), Finnish Olympic hammer thrower
- Erik Eriksen (Danish footballer) (1904–1982), Danish footballer
- Erik Eriksson (Swedish footballer) (1914–1990), Swedish footballer
- Erik Eriksson (swimmer) (1879–1940), Swedish Olympic swimmer
- Jonas Eriksson (biathlete) (Erik Jonas Eriksson, born 1970), Swedish biathlon Olympian
- Lars Erik Eriksen (born 1954), Norwegian cross country skier
- Lester Eriksson (1942–2021), Swedish swimmer

== Arts, entertainment ==
- Eric Ericson (1918–2013), Swedish choral conductor
- Eric Ericson (actor) (born 1974), Swedish actor
- Kaj-Erik Eriksen (born 1979), Canadian actor

== Others ==
- Eric Erickson (spy) (1889–1983), Swedish oil executive and World War II spy
- Erik Eriksen (explorer) (1820–1888), Norwegian explorer
- Erik Erikson (1902–1994), Danish-German-American psychologist and psychoanalyst
- Erik Erikson, fictional central character of 2004 fantasy novel in the Avatar Chronicles trilogy Epic by Conor Kostick
- Erick Erickssong, fictional character
