= Eric J. Arnould =

Anthropologist, marketing academic, and author

- Occupations: Anthropologist, marketing academic, and author

Academic background
- Education: B.A., Anthropology; M.A., Anthropology; Ph.D., Social Anthropology and Archaeology
- Alma mater: Bard College; University of Arizona

Academic work
- Institutions: Aalto University

Eric J. Arnould is an anthropologist, marketing academic, and author. He is an emeritus professor at Aalto University School of Business.

Arnould's research work has focused on problems of economic development and natural resources management in West and East Africa, and based on the experiences of Africa, has concentrated on developing anthropological perspectives on marketing and consumer culture. He worked on developing the sub-discipline of "Consumer Culture Theory" (CCT) as well as co-edited two editions of a book titled Consumer Culture Theory. He is a fellow of the Academy of Marketing Science and has received Honorary Doctorates from Aalto University and the University of Southern Denmark.

== Education ==
Arnould completed his B.A. in Anthropology from Bard College in 1973. Later, from the University of Arizona, he earned his M.A. in Anthropology in 1975 and Ph.D. in Social Anthropology and Archaeology in 1982. Additionally, between 1982 and 1983, he undertook a postgraduate fellowship in marketing from the same institution.

== Career ==
From 1986 to 1989, Arnould worked as a research associate at the University of Arizona. Subsequently, he held the position of assistant professor of anthropology at the University of Colorado, which he maintained till 1991. Later, at the California State University, the University of South Florida, and the University of Nebraska–Lincoln, he was appointed as an associate professor of marketing from 1991 to 1994, 1994 to 1998, and 1999 to 2000, respectively. Following this, at the University of Nebraska, he was employed as a professor of marketing from 2000 to 2005. He was also designated as E.J. Faulkner College professor and worked as interim director of CBA Agribusiness Programs at the same institution between 2003 and 2005.

Arnould undertook the role of PETSMART Distinguished Professor at the University of Arizona from 2005 to 2007. Later that year, he also held the appointment of distinguished professor at the University of Wyoming, which he maintained till 2010. In the following year, he assumed the position of professor at the University of Bath until 2013. Furthermore, between 2013 and 2016, he took on the role of professor and chaired the Danish Institute for Advanced Studies at the University of Southern Denmark. Aalto University has granted him the title of emeritus professor.

== Research ==
=== Economic development ===
During his early research work, Arnould revealed that cultural values determine consumers' behavior, for instance, the diffusion of innovations, and underscored the interconnected social structures of contrasting models, such as the 'Islamic-nationalist model', the 'Western market-based model', and a 'traditional pre-market model'. While studying the significant role of infrastructure development in marketplaces, he addressed the macro-marketing constraints affecting the means of distribution of marketing in the Western African Region, stating that the poor state of roads in rural areas limits the expansion of distribution channels.

Along with Plastina and Ball, Arnould carried out a research study on farmers in Peru, Guatemala, and Nicaragua, concluding that farmers with Fair Trade (FT) certification have increased sales and revenue. They also revealed that FT certified farmers have a slightly better quality of living, including medical care, availability of water, and cement floors, as well as have a greater degree of self-reported happiness.

=== Service, consumer culture and ethnography ===
Arnould used the attachment theory to comprehend the customer's attachment to an item of interest, identified that personal experiences provide significance to the possession of desired things in the United States, whereas social status is the main component of significance in Nigeria, concluding that symbolic meaning of possessions varies across cultures. They further highlighted that attachment with objects symbolizes security, represents integration into society, and articulates self-concept.

In 1991, along with Wallendorf, he commented on Thanksgiving, stating that it is "not just a moment of bounty but a culture of enduring abundance is celebrated." He also asserted that specific traditions related to the customer's culture, such as Christmas and birthdays, should be considered as guidelines for a socially acceptable experience. He and Linda Price demonstrated that associations between tour guides and customers, as well as customers to customers, create significance, contribute to satisfaction, and desire to return. They also highlighted that different facets of an experience, especially with tourism, might contribute to exceptional value and increased satisfaction. Additionally, he noted that perceptions of favorable relational context, including proxemic intimacy, affective content, and duration among service providers and clients significantly impact customer satisfaction and positive affect. He further underscored that service encounters are based on three dimensions, including emotional content, spatial proximity, and span of the interaction.

Arnould and Thompson introduced the Consumer Culture Theory (CCT) and emphasized the scientific reductionist and oversimplification approaches that are prevalent in consumer culture evaluation. He also investigated the experiential, symbolic, and sociocultural factors influencing consumer behavior. This theory is based on the perspectives that highlight the dynamic association among cultural factors, consumer behavior, and marketplace. It encompasses five categories: "marketplace cultures", "mass-mediated marketplace ideologies", "consumers’ interpretive strategies", "consumer identity projects", and "socio-historic patterning of consumption".

Arnould edited two editions of the book titled Consumer Culture Theory, providing theoretical underpinnings, organized frameworks, and varied case studies. Hunter Jones from ESSEC University remarked that the book "manages to cover a shocking breadth of research without overwhelming the reader or privileging any one particular theoretical orientation at the expense of others". In addition to this, he also described it as "a refreshing supplement" and "an invaluable guide".

Arnould and colleagues highlighted value creation in brand communities and determined four engagement procedures such as "documenting", "badging", "milestoning", and "staking". Moreover, they presented the idea that interaction among customers in brand communities adds value to both the company and its participants.

== Awards and honors ==
- 1998 – Fellow, Academy of Marketing Science
- 2016 – Honorary Doctorate, Aalto University
- 2020 – Honorary Doctorate, University of Southern Denmark
- 2025 – Evert Gummesson Outstanding Research Award, Naples Forum on Service

== Bibliography ==
=== Books ===
- Shaikh; Asif; Arnould; Eric (1988). Opportunities for sustained development, successful natural resources management in the Sahel. USAID.
- Arnould, Eric J.; Price, Linda; Zinkhan, George M. (2005). Consumers (2nd ed.). McGraw Hill. ISBN 9780072537147.
- Thompson, Craig; Crockett, David; Arnould, Eric; Weinberger, Michelle (2023). Consumer Culture Theory (2nd ed.). SAGE Publications. ISBN 9781529609264.

=== Selected articles ===
- Arnould, Eric J.; Price, Linda L. (June 1993). "River Magic: Extraordinary Experience and the Extended Service Encounter". Journal of Consumer Research. 20 (1): 24–45. doi:10.1086/209331.
- Arnould, Eric J.; Wallendorf, Melanie (November 1994). "Market-Oriented Ethnography: Interpretation Building and Marketing Strategy Formulation". Journal of Marketing Research. 31 (4): 484–504. doi:10.1177/002224379403100404.
- Price, Linda L.; Arnould, Eric J. (October 1999). "Commercial Friendships: Service Provider–Client Relationships in Context". Journal of Marketing. 63 (4): 38–56. doi:10.1177/002224299906300405.
- Arnould, Eric J.; Thompson, Craig J. (March 2005). "Consumer Culture Theory (CCT): Twenty Years of Research". Journal of Consumer Research. 31 (4): 868–882. doi:10.1086/426626.
- Schau, Hope Jensen; Muñiz Jr., Albert M.; Arnould, Eric J. (September 2009). "How Brand Community Practices Create Value". Journal of Marketing. 73 (5): 30–51. doi:10.1509/jmkg.73.5.30.
- Arnould, E. J. (2022). "Ontology and circulation: towards an eco-economy of persons". Journal of Marketing Management. 38 (1–2): 71–97. doi:10.1080/0267257X.2021.2000007.
