= Aric =

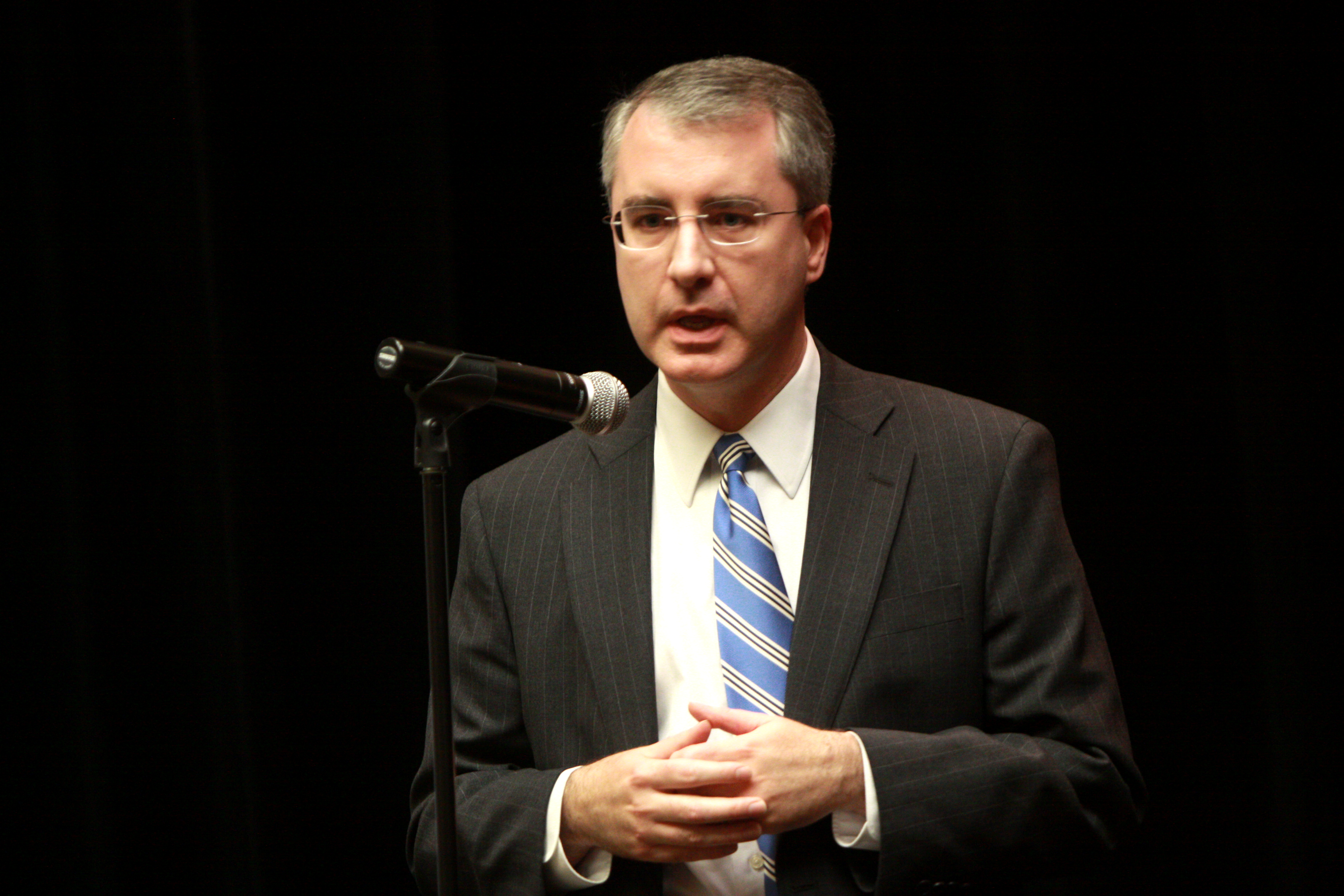
Aric Newhouse

Aric is a masculine given name which may refer to:

- Aric Almirola (born 1984), American professional stock car racing driver
- Aric Anderson (born 1965), American former football player
- Aric Hagberg, American applied mathematician and academic
- Aric Nesbitt (born 1980), American politician, member of the Michigan Senate
- Aric Putnam, American politician elected to the Minnesota Senate in 2020
- Aric Sigman, British psychologist
