= Erik Nordström =

Photos Images

Erik Nordström may refer to:

- Erik Nordström (organ builder)
- Erik Nordström (singer)
- Erik Nordstrom (businessman)
