= What a Piece of Work I Am =

1994 novel by Eric Kraft

- First edition
- Author: Eric Kraft
- Language: English
- Series: The Personal History, Adventures, Experiences & Observations of Peter Leroy
- Genre: Comedy
- Publisher: Crown
- Publication date: 5 April, 1994
- Publication place: United States
- Media type: Print (hardback & paperback)
- Pages: 275 pp (first edition hardcover)
- ISBN: 0-517-59612-1 (first edition hardcover)
- OCLC: 28418858
- Dewey Decimal: 813/.54 20
- LC Class: PS3561.R22 W43 1994
- Preceded by: Where Do You Stop?
- Followed by: At Home with the Glynns

What A Piece of Work I Am (A Confabulation) is a novel by Eric Kraft. It is part of his ongoing project of interconnected fiction "The Personal History, Adventures, Experiences and Observations of Peter Leroy." The novel is narrated by Leroy, but mainly concerns his boyhood crush and sultry muse, Ariane Lodkcochnikov.

== Plot summary ==
We are told at the beginning of the novel that Ariane is a figment of his imagination, yet we learn her life story in intimate detail and the lines between reality and imagination are blurred throughout the story. Named for Ariadne, the heroine of Greek myth who helps Theseus escape the Minotaur, Ariane begins as the promiscuous beauty of the fictional town of Babbington, Long Island. We follow as she tries to escape her demeaning job at a clam shack and bad-girl reputation, going through several phases of personal examination and reinvention. Ariane is an energetic storyteller, and she relates her story to Leroy and the reader through a series of funny and poignant episodes that explore the power of personal fantasy. In one sequence, Leroy's grandfather, with Ariane's help, comforts his dying wife by pretending their home is a ship making the journey to the tropical destination of Rarotonga. Later, we learn that much of Ariane's life has been a public exhibition in a very literal way. As Ariane weaves her story, Leroy acts as a foil and guide, often finishing her sentences and filling in details.

== Literary significance & criticism ==
Kraft has created a disjointed narrative, interrupted by descriptions of films based loosely on Ariane's life and various asides (many concerning Leroy's lust for Ariane); we are even told at one point that she had died in a fire, only to be resurrected by Leroy to continue her story.
