= Eric Anderson =

Eric, Erik, or Erick Anderson may refer to:

== Sports ==
- Eric Anderson (English footballer) (1931–1990), English footballer for Liverpool
- Eric Anderson (rugby union) (1931–2014), New Zealand rugby union player
- Erick Anderson (born 1968), American football player
- Eric Anderson (basketball, born 1970) (1970–2018), American NBA basketball player
- Erik Anderson (ice hockey) (born 1978), American ice hockey player
- Eric Anderson (basketball, born 1993), American basketball player

== Politics ==
- Eric O. Anderson (1905–1980), American politician, member of the Washington House of Representatives
- Eric Anderson (Idaho politician) (born 1956), American politician, Idaho State Representative
- Eric Anderson (New Hampshire politician), American politician, New Hampshire State Representative

== Others ==
- Eric Anderson (VC) (1915–1943), English soldier, recipient of the Victoria Cross
- Eric Anderson (teacher) (1936–2020), British educator
- Eric Anderson (sociologist) (born 1968), American sociologist
- Eric Anderson (actor) (born 1972), American actor
- Eric Chase Anderson (born 1973), American writer and illustrator
- Eric C. Anderson (born 1974), American entrepreneur and aerospace engineer

== See also ==
- Eric Andersen (disambiguation)
- Erik Andersen (disambiguation)
- Erik Andersson (disambiguation)
