= Kevin Gregson =

Canadian murderer (born 1966)

- Born: August 30, 1966 (age 60); Cote Reserve, Kamsack, Saskatchewan, Canada
- Occupation: RCMP officer
- Convictions: First degree murder Robbery; Sexual assault
- Penalty: Life imprisonment without the possibility of parole for 25 years

Kevin Reid Gregson (born August 30, 1966) is a former Royal Canadian Mounted Police (RCMP) officer convicted of the murder of Ottawa Police constable Eric Czapnik in the early morning of December 29, 2009.

== Biography ==
=== Early life ===
Gregson was born of Métis descent on the Cote Reserve, Kamsack, Saskatchewan and raised in Ottawa after he was adopted at two days old by Reid and Faye Gregson. They were not given any medical information about his biological family, his mother’s pregnancy or his birth.

At 13, around the time he started shooting animals with a pellet gun, he became, at times, so uncontrollable that his mother would send him to the garage. He resisted his father’s discipline and started running away from home at 16, at first for hours, and then overnight. One of those arguments ended in a physical fight with his father and, in turn, he was kicked out of the house and ended up living at a neighbor's. He was later placed in child-welfare care for up to three months before returning home.

At age 19, Gregson had broken into his Latter Day Saint Church in Ottawa and stolen some items including a television. He was charged and convicted of this crime. He was not able to apply for work in policing due to this, so he waited 10 years and applied for a pardon (and to have his record sealed). He then went through the process of applying to become a police officer. Gregson graduated from Merivale High School, but returned for grade 13 so he could play football and ended up dropping out. He then went to Algonquin College where he later dropped out of environmental studies and their law and security course. Gregson then dropped out of a nursing program and later completed a native-addictions course.

Gregson served an LDS mission in the Salt Lake City South and Utah Provo missions from 1988 to 1990. As a missionary he was intense and focused, but at times showed resistance to authority. Though some did find him difficult to work with, he completed his two years of service and was released honorably. After his mission, he took jobs as an orderly — first at the Royal Ottawa Mental Health Centre and then the Riverview Hospital in Sault Ste. Marie, Ontario. While working as an RCMP officer in Saskatchewan in 2006, he threatened to kill an LDS Church bishop in Regina after having the renewal of his temple recommend refused. During this encounter he pulled a knife and stated that he was trained to kill. He was found guilty and received a conditional discharge.

=== Personal life and education ===
Gregson studied addictions counselling at Sault College in Sault Ste. Marie, Ontario.

=== Career ===
Gregson graduated from RCMP Academy, Depot Division on August 4, 1998. On February 12, 2000, Gregson was cited for bravery for disarming a gunman near Pelly, Saskatchewan. He was suspended in 2006 after a number of run-ins with senior officers. He was ordered to resign from the force in 2008, but appealed. On March 17, 2008, Gregson and his mother visited the Ottawa home of then-RCMP Commissioner William J. S. Elliott where they presented cookies and documents. Afterward, Gregson received a suspension as this violated the previous sanction he had received for visiting his supervisor's Regina home.

In 2009, Commissioner Elliott stated that Gregson had recently been suspended without pay and asked to resign from the RCMP or face dismissal. Gregson refused to resign and was in the process of appealing the dismissal. An unnamed veteran RCMP officer remarked of Gregson's case: "When I was in, they didn’t discipline you out; they forced you out by making your life miserable. That remains part of the culture. That’s what they were trying to do." According to the RCMP Act, the force cannot place an emotionally troubled member into treatment, although they can threaten dismissal to persuade the member to receive treatment. The Ottawa Citizen found that Gregson remained on the RCMP payroll during the disciplinary and termination proceedings.

== Murder of Ottawa Police constable ==
At the end of December 2009, Gregson raped a 10-year old girl four times.

In the early morning of December 29, 2009 at approximately 4:30 am, Gregson stabbed and killed Constable Eric Czapnik at the emergency entrance of the Ottawa Civic Hospital. After the incident Gregson was apprehended by civilian bystanders as well as four members of the Ottawa Paramedic Service before being transferred to police custody.

He claimed he killed Czapnik as part of a "suicide attempt on his part. He wanted a gun because he couldn't do it with the knife he had." He later said in a police video that "My intent was to die. "So I needed a gun ... police officers have guns ... so I went to a hospital." This claim was despite Gregson wearing two bulletproof vests during the attack. He said during the interrogation and testimony he tried to cut his own throat in the bathtub that night. He partially blamed his conduct on cranial colloid cysts he believed he had.

The Ottawa Police Service charged Gregson with first-degree murder, robbery and using an imitation firearm in the commission of an offense. On March 13, 2012, a jury returned a guilty verdict for the charges of first-degree murder and robbery, with a sentence of life imprisonment with the possibility of parole after 25 years. When the sexual assault of the 10-year old girl was discovered shortly after Gregson's initial sentencing, he was sentenced to another ten years in September 2012; the sentence is to be served concurrently.
