= Erik Eriksen (Danish footballer) =

Danish footballer (1904-1982)

Personal information
- Date of birth: 28 February 1904
- Place of birth: Frederiksberg, Denmark
- Date of death: 8 January 1982 (aged 77)

International career
Years	Team	Apps	(Gls)
1929	Denmark	2	(0)

Erik Eriksen (28 February 1904 – 8 January 1982) was a Danish footballer. He played in two matches for the Denmark national football team in 1929.
