= Ēriks Koņeckis =

Latvian ice hockey player

- Born: 9 February 1920 Riga, Latvia
- Died: 2 February 2006 (aged 85) Dortmund, Germany
- Position: Forward/Defence
- Played for: ASK Rīga; Augsburger EV; Krefelder EV; Mannheimer ERC
- National team: Latvia
- Playing career: 1936–1959

Ēriks Koņeckis (9 February 1920 – 2 February 2006) was a Latvian ice hockey player. He played the World Championships for Latvia in 1939. After World War II and occupation of Latvia, Koņeckis played in Germany for Augsburg, Krefeld and Mannheim.
