= Eric Crawford =

Eric Crawford may refer to:

- Eric Crawford (soccer) for Toronto Lynx
- Eric Crawford (Taken)
- Eric Crawford (sports journalist) on WDRB
- Eric Crawford, co-writer of I Can't Hear the Music
- Rick Crawford (politician) (Eric Alan Crawford, born 1966), Member of the U.S. House of Representatives from Arkansas
