= Eric Campbell =

Eric or Erik Campbell may refer to:

== Sports ==
- Eric Campbell (rugby union) (1942–2006), Irish lock at Old Wesley and Leinster
- Erik Campbell (American football) (born 1966), American football safety, wide receiver and coach
- Eric Campbell (basketball) (born 1977), American power forward
- Eric Campbell (baseball) (born 1987), American first and third baseman

== Others ==
- Eric Campbell (actor) (1879–1917), English heavy in Charlie Chaplin films
- Eric Campbell (political activist) (1893–1970), Australian leader of the New Guard Fascist movement
- Eric Campbell (reporter), Australian foreign correspondent since the 1980s

== Characters ==
- Erik Campbell (Final Destination), fictional character in the 2025 American film Final Destination Bloodlines

== See also ==
- Eric-Campbell, British car maker between 1919 and 1926
- Sir Eric Geddes (Eric Campbell Geddes, 1875–1937), British Conservative politician
