= Eric Turner =

Eric Turner may refer to:

== Sports ==
- Eric Turner (American football) (1968–2000), American football player
- Eric Turner (athlete) (born 1909), English athlete
- Eric Turner (basketball) (born 1963), American basketball player

== Others ==
- Scott Turner (politician) (born 1972), officially Eric Scott Turner, American politician
- Eric Turner (singer) (born 1977), American singer and songwriter
- Eric Gardner Turner (1911–1983), English papyrologist and classicist
- P. Eric Turner (born 1951), Indiana politician
