= Eric Scott =

Eric Scott may refer to:

== In the arts ==
- Eric Scott (actor) (born 1958), American actor
- Eric Scott (writer) (1910–1971), Australian writer, actor, and director
- Eric R. Scott, Canadian filmmaker

== Other ==
- Eric Oswald Gale Scott (1899-1986), Australian ichthyologist and museum director
- Eric Scott Jr. (born 1998), American football player

== See also ==
- Erick Scott (born 1981), Costa Rican footballer
