= Erich Roth =

Erich Roth (1910 – executed in 1947 in Yugoslavia) was a functionary in the Gestapo (secret police) of Nazi Germany and war criminal during World War II.

Roth studied law at the University of Jena and University of Göttingen and worked as an assessor for the Gestapo in Berlin starting in February 1938. After the war began, he worked in the occupation administration in the General Government in Poland starting in October 1939. Later he took over the office groups IV B1 and IV B2 (church affairs) in the newly formed Reich Security Main Office.

In February 1943, Roth was head of the Gestapo office in Dortmund, the position that he held through 1944. In 1947, Roth was extradited by France to Yugoslavia to stand trial. He was convicted, sentenced to death and executed.

== Bibliography ==
- Michael Wildt. Generation des Unbedingten. Das Führungskorps des Reichssicherheitshauptamtes. Hamburger Edition, Hamburg 2003, ISBN 3-930-90875-1
