= Eric Gonzalez =

Eric Gonzalez may refer to:

- Eric González (born 1986), Spanish baseball pitcher
- Eric Gonzalez (lawyer), Kings County district attorney in Brooklyn, New York
- Erik González (born 1991) Dominican Republic baseball infielder
- Eric Gonzalez (soccer), (born 1994), American soccer player

== See also ==
- Erich Gonzales
- Eric Gonzales
