= Eric Bell (footballer, born 1922) =

English footballer

Personal information
- Date of birth: 13 February 1922
- Place of birth: Bedlington, England
- Date of death: 2004 (aged 81–82)
- Position: Wing half

Senior career*
Years	Team	Apps	(Gls)
1946–1957	Blackburn Rovers	323	(9)
- * Club domestic league appearances and goals

Eric Bell (13 February 1922 – 2004) was an English footballer who played in the Football League for Blackburn Rovers. He had previously played for Blyth Shipyard.
