= Erik Olsson (footballer) =

Swedish footballer

Personal information
- Full name: Erik Gunnar Olsson
- Date of birth: 22 September 1995 (age 31)
- Place of birth: Sweden
- Height: 1.78 m (5 ft 10 in)
- Position: Midfielder

Youth career
- Hagaströms SK
- –2011: Hille IF
- 2012–2013: Gefle IF

Senior career*
| Years | Team | Apps | (Gls) |
| 2010–2011 | Hille IF 2 | 9 | (1) |
| 2011 | Hille IF | 2 | (0) |
| 2012–2015 | Gefle IF | 3 | (0) |
- * Club domestic league appearances and goals as of 11 January 2016

Erik Olsson (born 22 September 1995) is a Swedish footballer who plays as a midfielder.
