= Erik Christensen (disambiguation) =

Erik Christensen (born 1983) is a Canadian ice hockey centre.

Erik Christensen may also refer to:

- Erik Christensen (American football) (1931–2022), American football defensive end
- Erik Christensen (canoeist) (born 1938), Danish sprint canoer
- Erik Skov Christensen (born 1958), Danish teacher, politician and former mayor

== See also ==
- Eric Christensen (disambiguation)
