= Sven and Erik Nordström =

Swedish organ builders

Sven and Erik Nordstrom are two famous Swedish organ builders from the 19th century. Sven Nordstrom (4 February 1801 - 16 February 1887) and his younger brother Erik Nordstrom (28 September 1818 - 26 January 1907) were established starting 1879 in Eksjo.

The value of their work is well recognized as of the 50 organs they built, about half survived in service to this day, and many are still in their original condition.

They were also known for repairing facades of churches

== Organs ==
- Jönköpings frimurarloge, 1834
- Bälaryds kyrka, Småland, 1839
- Hults kyrka, Småland, 1841
- Edshults kyrka, Småland, 1843
- Sankt Laurentii kyrka, Söderköping, 1845
- Å kyrka, Östergötland, 1846
- Tåby kyrka, Östergötland, 1847
- Målilla kyrka, Småland, 1850
- Västra Eneby kyrka, Östergötland, 1851
- Skönberga kyrka, Östergötland, 1852
- Ledbergs kyrka, Östergötland, 1852
- Normlösa kyrka, Östergötland, 1854
- Flisby kyrka, Småland, 1856
- Forserums kyrka, Småland, 1856
- Nässja kyrka, Östergötland, 1856
- Tingstads kyrka, Östergötland, 1862
- Nykils kyrka, Östergötland, 1863
- Linderås kyrka, Småland, 1864
- Östra Ny kyrka, Östergötland, 1865
- Hägerstads kyrka, Östergötland, 1866
- Sjögestads kyrka, Östergötland, 1870
- Barkeryds kyrka, Småland, 1873*
- Norrköpings fängelsekyrka, 1873
- Karlstorps kyrka, Småland, 1876
- Bankeryds kyrka, Småland, 1879*
- Eksjö metodistkyrka, 1880
- Kuddby kyrka, Östergötland, 1882
- Lekeryds kyrka, Småland, 1888*
- Näsby kyrka, Småland, 1893*

(* means just Erik Nordstrom, others joint)

=== Facades ===
About the facades they have repaired:

- Skede kyrka, Småland, 1835
- Rumskulla kyrka, Småland, 1840
- Mellby kyrka, Småland, 1844
- Björkö kyrka, Småland 1848
- Linköpings högre allm. läroverk, 1849
- Värna kyrka, Östergötland, 1850
- Liareds kyrka, Västergötland, 1855
- Bankekinds kyrka, Östergötland, 1857
- Marbäcks kyrka, Småland, 1858
- Frinnaryds kyrka, Småland, 1858
- Mjölby kyrka, 1859*
- Östra Stenby kyrka, Östergötland, 1860
- Järstorps kyrka, Småland, 1864*
- Bredestads kyrka, Småland, 1866*
- Eksjo kyrka, 1867
- Lönneberga kyrka, Småland, 1874*
- Torpa kyrka, Östergötland, 1875*
- Hässleby kyrka, Småland, 1878
- Asby kyrka, Östergötland, 1887*

(* means just Erik Nordstrom, others joint)

== Notes ==
- Erici, Einar (1965). Inventarium över bevarade äldre kyrkorglar i Sverige: tillkomna före mitten av 1800-talet några ock mellan åren 1850 och 1865 och ett par ännu senare, men dock stilistiskt sammanhörande med de äldre. Stockholm: Kyrkomusikernas riksförbund. Libris
- Carl-Gustaf Lewenhaupt: Orgelbyggarna Sven & Erik Nordström, Eksjöbygdens orgelgrupp (1993)
- Frisk Anna, Jullander Sverker, McCrea Andrew, (2003). The Nordic-Baltic organ book: history and culture. GOArt publications, Göteborg Organ Art Center, Univ.
