= Eric Manchester =

American actor and model (1964–2023)

- Born: Ronald Eugene Liter; August 26, 1964; Dallas, Texas, U.S.
- Died: March 12, 2023 (aged 58); San Francisco, U.S.
- Resting place: Wellston
- Other name: Paul Carson
- Occupations: Actor; Model
- Years active: 1985–1994
- Agent: Falcon Studios

Eric Manchester (born Ronald Eugene Liter; August 26, 1964 – March 12, 2023) was an American adult film actor who became one of the most prominent "gay-for-pay" performers of the late 1980s. Known for his athletic build and "military" aesthetic, Manchester appeared in approximately thirty films between 1985 and 1994, several of which are considered classics of the era.

== Early life and military service ==
Ronald Eugene Liter was born in Dallas, Texas, to Donald Liter and Patricia Hampton. He was raised in a Mormon household in the countryside, spending his formative years in Oklahoma and Indiana alongside his four sisters and brother.

As a young man, Liter joined the United States Marine Corps. While serving as a Marine, he was introduced by a fellow serviceman to Dirk Yates, the CEO of Seabag Productions, a studio known for "real military" content. This introduction marked his entry into the adult industry; his first professional job involved posing in swimwear for Yates.

== Career ==
Manchester transitioned from military-themed modeling to mainstream gay pornography, primarily working under the stage name Eric Manchester. Despite his prolific career in the genre, he initially identified as heterosexual and performed strictly as an active ("top") performer.

Manchester was highly regarded by directors for his professionalism and charisma. In a 1989 interview with Manshots magazine, Dirk Yates described him as "classy, really handsome, and a gentleman".

In 1991, the founders of Fine-Line Productions, Jim Steel and Jeff Appel, praised Manchester's screen presence:

"The sexiest guy in the world... He oozes sexuality," stated Steel. Appel added, "He's the best. It's always a pleasure working with him... there's something about him that's incredibly sexy".

Between 1985 and 1994, Manchester starred in roughly 30 films. Several of these are now regarded as groundbreaking titles such as Giant Splash Shots 2, In Your Wildest Dreams, Spokes 2: The Graduation, Head of Class, and The Rites of Summer.

However, in the years following his departure from the adult industry, Manchester underwent a personal transition. Despite his earlier public identification as straight, he eventually came out as gay to his family, reconciling his private life with the career that had made him an icon in the LGBTQ+ community.

== Death ==
On March 12th, 2023, while visiting San Francisco, Manchester was found dead in his hotel room by housekeeping staff. A subsequent investigation determined the cause of death to be a heroin overdose. He was 58 years old at the time of his death.

Following his death, he was returned to his roots and buried at Wellston Cemetery in Oklahoma.

== Filmography ==
=== Film ===
Year	Title	Role	Notes
1985	Gay XXX Superstars of the 1980's	Paul	Debut
1986	Double Load: Video Games 3	Bill	
1986	Kurt Bauer's Intense Moments: Video Games 11	Handsome Guy	
1986	Innocence Lost	Eric	
1986	The Exchange	Eric	
1986	Giant Splash Shots II	Mike	
1987	Sex Drive 2020	Eric	
1987	Giants: It's So Much Larger Than Life	Eric	
1987	Men of Size 1	Eric	
1987	Down for the Count	Eric-Star Wrestler	
1988	Bulge: Mass Appeal	Manchester	
1988	Touch Me: It's Hot, It's Tender	Eric	
1988	The Next Valentino	Eric	
1988	A Big Business	Frank	
1988	Head of the Class	Sexy Guy	
1988	They Grow 'em Big	Bob Roberts	
1988	Bulge: Mass Appeal	Eric	
1988	Touch Me: It's Hot, It's Tender	Eric	
1988	The Next Valentino	Bruce	
1988	A Big Business	Sauna Boy	
1988	57 Pick-Up	Mountain Guy	
1988	Superhunks 1	Eric	
1988	Switch Video 4	Eric	
1988	Spokes 2: The Graduation	Matt	
1988	Big Ones!: Hot Shots 21	Steven	
1989	Sex Waves	Eric	
1989	Catalina Preview Tape 3: It's What's Inside That Counts	Rick	
1989	Mannequin Man	Eric	
1988	Crosswire	Eric	
1989	The Rites of Summer	Vincent	
1989	Powerline	Eric	
1989	In Your Wildest Dreams	Tom	
1990	Giant Men	Greg	
1990	Dirty Daddies: Hot Shots 32	Handsome Guy	
1990	World of Sexual Oddities	Eric	
1990	Hot, Hung & Hard	Eric	
1991	The Best of Eric Manchester	Eric Manchester	
1992	Best Bi Far 2	Eric	
1993	Giants	Chris	
1993	Men of Size 2	Eric	
1993	Tough Competition 2	Eric	
1994	Dripping Hard 2	Paul	
1994	Anal Hall of Fame	Bobby	
1994	Tools of the Trade	Handsome Guy	
1994	Ball Blasters, Hard Hunks Collection	Eric	
1994	Hot & Hung 1	Paul Carson	
1994	Threes on Their Knees 3	Kyle	
1998	Locker Room Sex	Eric	
2002	Young Men of the 80's	Eric	
2004	Size Matters 1	Eric	
2021	Falcon Icons: The 1980s	Eric Manchester	
2025	Bareback Classics 3	Eric	Posthumous release
