= Eric Poole (disambiguation) =

Eric Poole (1885–1916) was a Canada-born British officer who was executed during the First World War.

Eric Poole may also refer to:

- Eric Poole (Australian politician) (1942–2021), Australian politician
- Eric Joseph Poole (1907–1969), Canadian politician
- Eric Poole (footballer) (1903–1968), Australian rules footballer
