= Eric Kraft =

American novelist

Eric Kraft (born 1944) is an American novelist. He is known for his series of novels that make up The Personal History, Adventures, Experiences and Observations of Peter Leroy. Each novel tells of some aspect of the fictional Leroy's life. Several are supposed to have been written by Leroy.

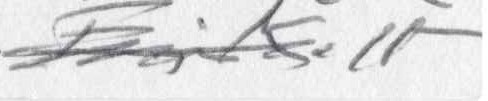
Eric Kraft's signature

== The Personal History, Adventures and Observations of Peter Leroy ==
=== Premise ===
Kraft's website describes the series:

"The Personal History, Adventures, Experiences & Observations of Peter Leroy is one large work of fiction composed of many interconnected parts. Its parts are the memoirs and collected works of a fictional character, Peter Leroy, who tells an alternative version of his life story; explores the effect of imagination on perception, memory, hope, and fear; holds a fun-house mirror to scenes of life in the United States; ruminates upon the nature of the universe and the role of human consciousness within it; and prods and probes the painful world of time and place in search of the niches where hilarity hides."

=== Works in the series ===
- Herb ’n’ Lorna (1989): Peter Leroy reconstructs the lives of his maternal grandparents and their animated erotic jewelry business.
- Reservations Recommended (1990): Leroy's childhood friend, Matthew Barber, is imagined as an adult. Barber is vice president of a toy company by day and a restaurant reviewer named B.W. Beath by night.
- Little Follies (1992, a collection of previously published novellas)
- Where Do You Stop? (1992): Peter must complete a school assignment thirty years late and, in so attempting, revisits his memories of the schoolteacher who challenged him.
- What a Piece of Work I Am (1993): Ariane is six years older than Peter. She's the ostensible bad girl who works in a clam shack. For a mysterious reasons, she has taken up an unusual theatrical experiment in which she must live her life before a crowd for many years.
- At Home with the Glynns (1995): Peter revisits the Glynn twins and takes on an unusual job that involves doctoring sketches and hiding a secret.
- Leaving Small's Hotel (1998): Peter and his wife Albertine, faced with looming costs, attempt to save their beloved hotel. Meanwhile, Peter reads fifty stories over the course of fifty nights.
- Inflating a Dog (2002): Peter's mother attempts to keep both a boat and her entrepreneurial dreams afloat. Meanwhile, Peter attempts to resuscitate a slowly sinking boat.
- Passionate Spectator (2004): Now living in Manhattan, Peter is summoned for jury duty and uses this moment to enter the mind of Matthew Barber in the present. He later takes on the identity of Bertram W. Beath in Miami.
- Flying (2009): A trilogy of the novellas "Taking Off'", "On the Wing", and "Flying Home". Flying juxtaposes Peter's early adventures traveling cross-country on an aerocycle with Peter and his wife Albertine revisiting this territory in the present.
