= Erik Nielsen (disambiguation) =

Erik Nielsen (1924–2008) was a Canadian lawyer and politician.

Erik Nielsen may also refer to:

- Erik Nielsen (conductor) (born 1977), American conductor
- Erik Nielsen (footballer, born 1932), Danish footballer
- Erik Nielsen (footballer, born 1937), Danish footballer
- Erik Nielsen (footballer, born 1938), Danish footballer
- Erik Charles Nielsen (born 1981), American actor

== See also ==
- Erik Nielson (disambiguation)
