= Ēriks Ševčenko =

Latvian ice hockey player

- Born: April 28, 1991 (age 33); Daugavpils, Latvian SSR, Soviet Union
- Height: 5 ft 11 in (180 cm)
- Weight: 185 lb (84 kg; 13 st 3 lb)
- Position: Defender
- Shoots: Left
- VHL team Former teams: Metallurg Novokuznetsk; SK LSPA/Riga; Liepājas Metalurgs; Tønsberg Vikings; San Francisco Bulls; Florida Everblades; Gwinnett Gladiators; Dinamo Riga; HK Liepāja; Yunost Minsk
- National team: Latvia
- Playing career: 2011–present

Ēriks Ševčenko (born April 28, 1991 in Daugavpils, Latvian SSR, Soviet Union) is a Latvian professional ice hockey player. He currently plays for Metallurg Novokuznetsk of the Supreme Hockey League.

Ševčenko previously played 31 games in the Kontinental Hockey League for Dinamo Riga.

Ševčenko has also played for the Latvia national team. He has a younger brother, Aturs Ševčenko, who also plays hockey.
