= Eric Arnold (footballer) =

English footballer (1922–2002)

Eric Arthur Arnold
Personal information
- Date of birth: 13 September 1922
- Place of birth: Mutford, Norfolk, England
- Date of death: April 2002 (aged 79–80)

Eric Arthur Arnold (13 September 1922 – April 2002) was a footballer who played professionally for Norwich City from 1947 to 1952, making 13 appearances. He was a left back.

== Sources ==
- Canary Citizens by Mike Davage, John Eastwood, Kevin Platt, published by Jarrold Publishing, (2001), ISBN 0-7117-2020-7
