= Aric Sigman =

British psychologist

Aric Sigman is a British psychologist.

== Early life ==
Aric Sigman was born in the United States into a Jewish family. His father and grandfather were both professors of medicine. He has lived in Britain since 1973.

== Career ==
He has made appearances on day-time TV, such as in 1994 in the role of an Agony Uncle giving advice to children on the Saturday Morning children's programme Live & Kicking. He lectures in schools on the subject of PSHE (Personal, social health and economic) education.

He has published medical journal articles and has authored books on alcoholism, eating disorders and children's screen time.

== Controversy ==
In 2009, an opinion by Sigman was misused as the basis for articles in the Daily Mail and other outlets which falsely implied that using Facebook could directly cause cancer. Sigman's article did not mention cancer. NHS issued a statement emphasizing that Sigman's study was not a systemic review, and the studies cited by Sigman did not support these conclusions. Physician and science writer Ben Goldacre has said that Sigman's work includes cherry picking of other scientist's studies to support a specific view. In response to these claims Sigman said that "It was clear that my article on daycare wasn't a scientific paper."

One such example of this is in his use of the paper "The Internet Paradox" in his Article "Well connected? The biological implications of 'social networking'". In this article, he cites the 1998 paper The Internet Paradox", which finds a weak correlation between Internet use and depression/loneliness. However, when the same authors revisited their sample group 3 years later, and found that the observed effects had dissipated, and that "This sample generally experienced positive effects of using the Internet on communication, social involvement, and well-being."
