= Eric Gee =

British architecture writer

Eric Arthur Gee (1913–1989) was an architectural historian associated with York and the Royal Commission on the Historical Monuments of England.

Gee studied at Walsall and Dudley Grammar School, Birmingham University, and Balliol College, Oxford, from where he obtained a D.Phil. Publications on Oxford masons (1953) and carpenters (1954) followed from this.

During the War he was in the Gunners and the Intelligence Corps. Gee married in 1949 and in 1950, he and his wife Olive moved to York where he opened the York office of the Royal Commission, of which he was head from 1950 to 1970. His work for the Commission involved extensive study of the medieval and later buildings of York, reflected in the first five published inventory volumes on the city, and his own publications. He was elected a Fellow of the Society of Antiquaries in 1954, and was an active member of the York Philosophical Society, Yorkshire Archaeological Society, and the Vernacular Architecture Group. He died on 16 June 1989.

== List of publications ==
- (1953) Oxford Masons 1370–1530. Royal Archaeological Institute of Great Britain and Ireland.
- (1954) Oxford Carpenters 1370–1530. Oxoniensia 17/18 for 1952/1953
- (1958) Some Dating Criteria. Vernacular Architecture Group.
- (1977) The Chronology of Crucks Transactions of the Ancient Monuments Society, Vol.22. Ancient Monuments Society.
- (1979) The Architecture of York. Cerialis Press.
- with Keighley, J. K. (1962) The Ark Museum, Kirkgate, Tadcaster: An Architectural Description with Notes on the Restoration.
- (1984) The Topography of Altars, Chantries and Shrines in York Minster. The Antiquaries Journal, 64(02), 337–350. doi:10.1017/S0003581500080458
- with Singleton, W. A. (195x) A History and Architectural Description of St. John's Church, Ousebridge, York: With Notes on Its Conversion as the York Institute of Architectural Study. St. Anthony's Press.
