= Éric Bourdon =

French painter and writer

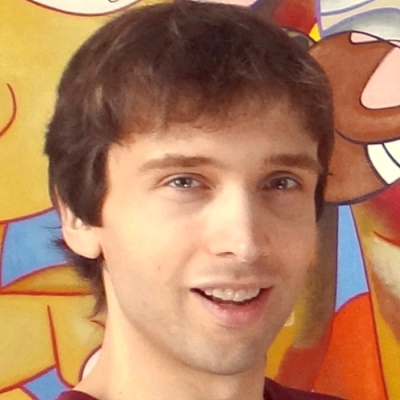
- Born: 1979 (age 46–47); Lille, France
- Occupations: Painter and writer
- Website: ericbourdon.com

Éric Bourdon (born 1979) is a French painter and writer.

== Painting career ==
Bourdon's works have in common vivid colors and unpremeditated pencil strokes, expressive of raw enthusiasm in the "art brut" or "Outsider Art" manner. Paul Masquelier, critic for the controversial review Eléments has pointed out the narcissistic or regressive aspects of his paintings, while conceding their social commentary and the feeling of joie de vivre they convey.

However, the core of his artistic practice is elsewhere. Bicha Gallery outlined it as follows: "Eric's work is more drawing than painting. It is a game with lines, first drawn in a spontaneous manner, random – much like a child doodling – then worked and reworked again and again until something new, a precise figure, character, emerges from this chaos. Always newness created from the nothingness. No character ever appears twice."

Indeed, Eric Bourdon's work is all about "improv drawing", as one can see on videos showing the artist drawing on a white board. Samantha Deman, critic for the French information website about contemporary art Arts Hebdo | Medias was enthusiastic after seeing the results in painting: "His universe is merry and fanciful, the stroke, spontaneous, has a great time on the canvas, virtuoso of the line, curves and arabesques, until the bright and luminous colours burst onto the scene and repossess it. Eric Bourdon bends kind monsters into shape who glide gracefully among a faun of individuals whose silhouettes are of the most amazing, plump or lanky, always infinitely sympathetic and delighted to come to stimulate our dormant child souls."

== Writing career ==
Bourdon wrote a book of philosophy in 2000 about artistic creation in practice. He wrote a long article for the magazine Concepts 1, comparing the first ethnological discoveries of L. Ron Hubbard, later the founder of the Church of Scientology, to Zarathustra by German philosopher Friedrich Nietzsche.

Six years later he published a dark psychological thriller, Les Voleurs d'Enfant (The Child Thieves), depicting a cult against the cults. Although set in Boston, it is a dig at the French associations claiming religious neutrality and opposition to cults while behaving the same way as the cults they denounce.

Les Clarificateurs (The Clearers), released in January 2012, is a more literary sequel to Les Voleurs d'Enfant, well received by critics. However, as the thriller seems to explore the family reasons that lead someone to enter into a very modern religious organisation, it might be seen this time again as a complete parody of these views and a critic of the failure of the modern society.

== Books ==
- Hors-sujets, ou l'art du néant et rebonds philosophiques ("Beside the Point, or the Art of Nothingness and Philosophical Rebounds"), Sils Maria asbl, February 2000.
- Introduction to Nietzsche's "Also Spratch Zarathustra", in Concepts [1], Sils Maria asbl, August 2000, pp 91–108.
- Les Voleurs d'Enfant (The Child Thieves), La Méduse, Lille, August 2006.
- Les Clarificateurs (The Clearers), La Méduse, Lille, January 2012.
