= Erik Andersen =

Erik Andersen may refer to:

- Erik Andersen (chess player) (1904–1938), Danish chess player
- Erik Andersen (cyclist) (1902–1980), Danish Olympic cyclist
- Erik Andersen (fencer) (1919–1993), Danish Olympic fencer
- Erik Andersen (politician) (born 1937), Norwegian politician
- Erik Bo Andersen (born 1970), Danish former professional footballer
- Erik Andersen (child molester) (born 1952), also referred to as "The Pocket Man", convicted Norwegian child molester

== See also ==
- Eric Andersen (disambiguation)
- Erik Andersson (disambiguation)
- Eric Anderson (disambiguation)
