= Eric Gargiulo =

American professional wrestler, commentator

Personal information
- Born: July 18, 1972 (age 54) Queens, NY

Professional wrestling career
- Ring name: Eric Gargiulo
- Trained by: Jim Kettner
- Debut: 1994

Eric Gargiulo (born July 18, 1972) is a professional wrestling announcer, wrestler, commentator, and radio show host. Gargiulo is most known for his years announcing and hosting for Combat Zone Wrestling.

== Professional wrestling career ==
Gargiulo trained with Jim Kettner and a variety of East Coast Wrestling Association (ECWA) wrestlers in 1994. He made about a dozen appearances wrestling for the ECWA and on independent shows.

== Announcing ==
=== Extreme Championship Wrestling ===
Gargiulo was a ring announcer for Extreme Championship Wrestling (ECW). He made his debut in November 1996 in Staten Island, New York. Gargiulo announced road shows for the company through May 1998.

=== Pro Wrestling Radio ===
Gargiulo began Pro Wrestling Radio in January 1999. Pro Wrestling Radio aired on WBCB 1490 AM out of Philadelphia from 1999–2009. The radio show is the longest consistent running professional wrestling radio talk show on terrestrial radio. It featured interviews with a variety of guests, including Steve Austin, Ricky Steamboat, Bret Hart, Edge, Dusty Rhodes, Tito Ortiz, Bruno Sammartino, and Superstar Billy Graham. Chris Jericho was the first guest on the debut show. Sammartino made more guest appearances on the show over ten years than any other guest.

In 2009, Gargiulo took ownership of the show and began broadcasting the show exclusively live online. The show periodically airs via podcast. The show is also available through iTunes via podcast.

=== Combat Zone Wrestling ===
Gargiulo joined Combat Zone Wrestling (CZW) as a commentator and announcer in 2000. He first entered CZW as a backstage interviewer and then made his announcing debut on the Caged to the End home video. Gargiulo was immediately paired with John House on the broadcasts.

Gargiulo announced and hosted shows for CZW through 2007. His work included pay-per-views, television and home videos. Gargiulo also traveled to Italy for CZW’s first Italian tour. He also worked behind-the-scenes helping write, book, and script for CZW.

=== Other promotions ===
Gargiulo has worked for most of the major independent pro wrestling companies as an announcer. Gargiulo announced for Dangerous Women of Wrestling’s television and home videos. In addition, he announced pay-per-views for Women's Extreme Wrestling from 2001–2008. During this time, he also called the action with Buck Woodward for several Japanese Pro Wrestling pay-per-views from 2002–2005. He announced the final two shows for Court Bauer’s Major League Wrestling.

Gargiulo and Steve Corino announced the first two Ring of Honor (ROH) home videos together. Gargiulo, however, left the company shortly before the third show due to conflicts between CZW and ROH. Gargiulo reunited with ex-CZW partner John House in 2007 for several Pro Wrestling Unplugged shows. He has also worked for Chikara. He later semi-retired as an announcer.

=== The Camel Clutch Blog ===
Gargiulo began the Camel Clutch Blog in 2007. The blog was published online by phillyburbs.com. His blog topics included professional wrestling, mixed martial arts, the NFL, and politics. The blog was highly ranked and often featured on Yahoo BUZZ. In 2009, Gargiulo took ownership of the blog. The Camel Clutch Blog was a popular sports blog on the Internet. The Camel Clutch Blog stopped regularly publishing content in 2017.

=== Other websites ===
Gargiulo developed and sold the website NFLLockout.com to the NFLPA for a reported $25,000.

=== Shoot interviews ===
Along with Rob Feinstein and Doug Gentry, Gargiulo helped innovate the professional wrestling shoot interview concept. Gargiulo began hosting shoot interviews for RF Video in 1996. He continues to host and write interviews for RF Video, Inc.

=== Author ===
Eric wrote and edited the questions for the WWE Pop Trivia Quiz Deck. The trivia game was published by Insights Publishing in 2019.
