= Eric Gregory =

Eric Gregory may refer to:

- Eric Gregory (American football) (born 2000), American football player
- Eric Gregory (speedway rider) (1911–1990), English motorcycle speedway rider
- Eric Craven Gregory (1887–1959), publisher and benefactor of modern art and artists

== See also ==
- Eric Gregory Award, a literary award, founded by Eric Craven Gregory
