= Eric Czapnik =

Polish police officer (born 1958)

- Born: Ireneusz Czapnik; May 26, 1958; Warsaw, Poland
- Died: December 29, 2009 (aged 51); Ottawa, Ontario, Canada
- Other name: Eric
- Police career
- Country: Canada
- Department: Ottawa Police Service
- Service years: 3
- Rank: Constable April 10, 2007
- Badge no.: 1907

Const. Ireneusz "Eric" Czapnik (May 26, 1958 – December 29, 2009) was a member of the Ottawa Police Service who was fatally stabbed in the early morning of December 29, 2009 at the Ottawa Civic Hospital. Former RCMP Officer Kevin Gregson was convicted of his murder.

Born in Warsaw, Poland on May 26, 1958, Czapnik immigrated to Ottawa, Ontario in 1990. He was married to Anna Korutowska and a father of four children. He has one sister who still resides in Poland along with his parents, Stanislaw and Josefa.

== Career ==
At age 19, Czapnik served one year of mandatory military service. After his time in the Polish Armed Forces, he worked for seven years with Warsaw Aircraft Enterprise as an aircraft mechanic. He also worked for two years doing construction in Greece.

In 1990, he immigrated to Canada and was an employee at Johnson's Business Interiors in Ottawa for 16 years; he became a manager before deciding on a career change. Czapnik joined the Ottawa Police Service on April 10, 2007. The career change meant that he was following in the footsteps of his father, who had worked as a police officer in Warsaw, Poland for 30 years.

Czapnik was a member of the Ottawa Police Service for approximately three years.

== Murder ==
While at the Ottawa Civic Hospital on an unrelated call, Const. Eric Czapnik was stabbed and killed while he was sitting in his patrol vehicle completing his notes. The attack is believed to have been random and unprovoked. The suspect, Kevin Gregson, an ex RCMP officer was then pinned to the ground by four nearby paramedics who held him there until police could arrive. Gregson, was arrested and charged with first-degree murder, robbery, and using an imitation firearm in the commission of an offense. He was convicted of first-degree murder and robbery on March 13, 2012.

A statement by the Czapnik family was released in the hours after his death. It outlines his commitment to his job, community and love for his family.
