= Xilent =

Polish electronic musician (born 1989)

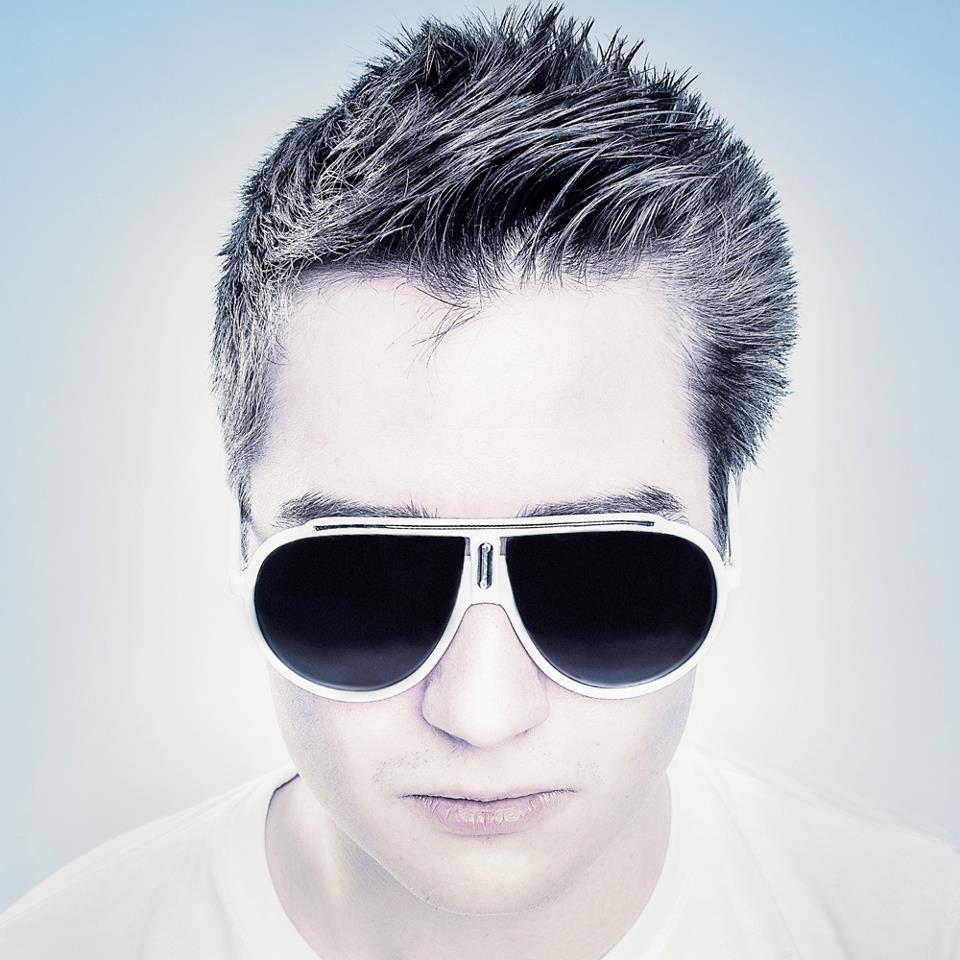
- Kowalczyk in 2009

Background information
- Born: Eryk Jerzy Kowalczyk; 29 July 1989 (age 37); Warsaw, Poland
- Genres: Dubstep; drum and bass
- Occupation: Music producer
- Instrument: Digital audio workstation
- Years active: 2010–present
- Labels: AudioPorn Records; Monstercat; Never Say Die
- Website: xilent.com

Eryk Jerzy Kowalczyk (born July 29, 1989), better known by his stage name Xilent, is a Polish electronic musician. He is best known for his work in dubstep, electro house, and drum and bass genres. Xilent has released two albums, We Are Virtual in 2015 on AudioPorn Records, and We Are Dust in 2019 on Monstercat.

Xilent has appeared on UKF Dubstep on multiple occasions. In addition to his home country of Poland, Xilent has also been based in the United Kingdom. As of 2015, he resides in Warsaw.

== Career ==
Kowalczyk's first experience with music creation occurred when he obtained his first personal computer at the age of eight, using the ReBirth RB-338 synthesizer. He was a drummer in a Polish punk band during his adolescence. His experience with the band led him to use Guitar Pro and later Cubase to programme his drums. Kowalczyk moved from Poland to the United Kingdom to study software engineering in Edinburgh in 2008, although he has not completed his degree as of 2015 due to his music career. By the late 2000s, Kowalczyk was a frequent user of MySpace and uploaded his drum and bass tracks to the website.

Kowalczyk's early output as Xilent was primarily in the drum and bass genre and its subgenre of neurofunk. His first release on AudioPorn Records was the extended play Choose Me, which included two versions of the title track and was released in 2011. Xilent would mainly release under AudioPorn Records until the mid-2010s, including his debut album, We Are Virtual, in 2015.

The track "Beyond" was featured on BBC Radio 1's Hottest Record in 2012, described by Zane Lowe as a hybrid between dubstep and drum and bass.

In 2014, Xilent collaborated with American artist Seven Lions on the electro house track "The Fall".

In 2015, Xilent produced a remix of Breathe Carolina & Shanahan’s "Moon & Stars", which was described by UKF as having influences from trance music and complextro. In 2016, Xilent released a remix of I Remember U by Cartoon and Jéja on NoCopyrightSounds. Xilent made his debut on Monstercat in 2015 with "Edge of the World", a collaboration with Italian producer Razihel.

Xilent debuted on Never Say Die Records with the track "Ultimate" in 2016, which was featured on the compilation Never Say Die Vol. 4. He later released the three-track extended play Your System on the label. In 2018, Xilent collaborated with British musician Chime on the track "Twinkle", which was released on Pilot, a record label operated by UKF.

Xilent released his second album, We Are Dust, on Canadian electronic music label Monstercat in 2019. The album was preceded by the single "You Rise", described by EDM.com as having an uplifting melody that gives way to "gritty, relentless bass growls" and punchy drums. Following the release of We Are Dust, Xilent collaborated with Justin OH for the single "Assemble", also released on Monstercat.

Xilent performed at a virtual reality concert in 2019. American music producer Cyazon has cited Xilent as an inspiration.

== Discography ==
=== Studio albums ===
Title	Details
We Are Virtual	Released: 17 May 2015; Label: AudioPorn Records; Format: Digital download
We Are Dust	Released: 20 May 2019; Label: Monstercat; Format: Digital download
