= Eric Stokes =

Eric Stokes may refer to:

- Eric Stokes (composer) (1930–1999), American composer
- Eric Thomas Stokes (1924–1981), historian of South Asia
- Eric Stokes (American football executive) (born 1973), American football scout, executive and former defensive back
- Eric Stokes (cornerback) (born 1999), American football cornerback
- Eric Stokes (American football guard) (born 1962), American football guard with the New England Patriots
