= Erik Andersson =

Erik Andersson may refer to:

== Sportsmen ==
- Erik Andersson (athlete) (1921–2002), Swedish Olympic athlete
- Erik Andersson (ice hockey, born 1971), Swedish ice hockey player who played for Calgary Flames
- Erik Andersson (ice hockey, born 1982), Swedish ice hockey player playing for Skellefteå AIK
- Erik Andersson (ice hockey, born 1986), Swedish ice hockey player playing for Timrå IK
- Erik Andersson (ice hockey, born 1994), Swedish ice hockey player playing for HV71
- Erik Andersson (speedway rider) (born 1984), Swedish speedway rider, competitor in 2007 Speedway Grand Prix of Sweden, etc.
- Erik Andersson (swimmer, born 1984), Swedish swimmer
- Erik Andersson (water polo) (1896–1985), Swedish water polo player and swimmer
- Erik Andersson (footballer) (born 1997), Swedish footballer

== Others ==
- Erik Andersson (architect) (born 1971), Swedish architect who designed Sicklauddsbron
- Erik Andersson (drummer), drummer for Swedish progressive death metal band Godgory
- Erik Andersson (translator) (born 1962), Swedish translator

== See also ==
- Erik Andersen (disambiguation)
- Eric Anderson (disambiguation)
- Kent-Erik Andersson (born 1951), retired Swedish hockey right winger
