= Academy of Marketing Science =

- Formation: 1971
- Founder: Harold W. Berkman
- Type: Nonprofit organization
- Region served: worldwide
- Fields: Marketing
- Website: https://www.ams-web.org/

The Academy of Marketing Science (AMS) is an international scholarly association dedicated to the field of marketing. Established in 1971, the organization was founded by a group of marketing scholars led by Dr. Harold W. Berkman of the C. W. Post Center at Long Island University.

The Academy of Marketing Science publishes the Journal of the Academy of Marketing Science (JAMS), which includes empirical, conceptual, and methodological articles. JAMS is included on the Financial Times Top 50 journal list. According to the 2023 Journal Citation Reports, it has an impact factor of 9.5. Additionally, it holds an A* rating in the ABDC Journal Quality List (2022)[10] and a 4* rating in the CABS 2024 Academic Journal Guide. The journal also confers annual best paper and long-term impact awards named after Jagdish N. Sheth and A. Parasuraman.

Since 2011, the Academy of Marketing Science has published AMS Review in its current format as a journal focused on conceptual papers. According to Scopus, the journal is ranked in the first quartile (Q1) in the marketing category. It holds a B rating in the ABDC Journal Quality List (2022)[10] and a 2* rating in the CABS 2024 Academic Journal Guide.

The Academy of Marketing Science edits the Developments in Marketing Science: Proceedings of the Academy of Marketing Science book series. The series compiles papers based on presentations from the AMS conferences. It is published by Springer. The organization also organizes two annual academic conferences: the AMS Annual Conference, held in North America, and the World Marketing Congress (AMS WMC), held outside North America. The AMS WMC was first held in 1983 as a biennial event. Additionally, the Academy has also hosted conferences on topics such as minority and multicultural marketing.
