= Eric Anderson (New Hampshire politician) =

American politician from New Hampshire

Member of the New Hampshire House of Representatives from the Merrimack 13 district
- In office 1996–2010

Personal details
- Party: Republican

Eric Anderson is an American Republican politician who represented the Merrimack 13 district in the New Hampshire House of Representatives from 1996 to 2010.

He endorsed the Mitt Romney 2012 presidential campaign in the 2012 United States presidential election.
