= Eryk Hansel =

Polish footballer

Personal information
- Date of birth: 10 June 1941 (age 85)
- Place of birth: Bielsko-Biała, Poland
- Position: Defender

Youth career
- 1962: Podbeskidzie Bielsko-Biała

Senior career*
Years	Team	Apps	(Gls)
1961–1963	Walter Rzeszów		
1964	Podbeskidzie Bielsko-Biała		
1965–1973	Stal Mielec	249	(3)
1977–1983	Toronto Falcons		
- * Club domestic league appearances and goals

Eryk Hansel (born 10 June 1941) is a Polish former footballer who played as a defender.

== Career ==
Hansel began his career at the youth level with Podbeskidzie Bielsko-Biała. In 1962, he played with Walter Rzeszów, and returned to Bielsko-Biała in 1964. The following season in played in the Ekstraklasa with Stal Mielec. In 1967, he was named the team captain, and assisted in securing the league title in 1973. In 1977, he played abroad in the National Soccer League with Toronto Falcons where he assisted in securing two championships. In 1980, he featured in the NSL Cup final against Toronto Italia, but were defeated.
