= Erik Flensted-Jensen =

Danish gymnast (1908–1993)

- Born: 1908
- Died: 1993 (aged 84–85)

Gymnastics career
- Discipline: Men's artistic gymnastics

Erik Flensted-Jensen (1908–1993) was the founder and leader of the Danish Gym Team.

== Early life ==
Flensted-Jensen participated in gymnastics from a young age and was a member of Niels Bukh's team in 1931.

== Gymnastics career ==
From 1939 to 1986, Flensted-Jensen toured the world showing Danish Elite Gymnastics to more than 2 million people in many countries around the globe. He was an ambassador for gymnastics and Danish culture everywhere he went with his teams. He wrote four books describing his travels with gymnastic teams. The books are all in the Danish language: "Med Niels Bukh Jorden Rundt" (1932), "40.000 km Under Dannebrog" (1945), "Med Dansk Ungdom I Amerikas Brogede Verden" (1952), "Mit Liv Og Mine Rejser" (1983).
