= Eric Garcia =

Eric Garcia may refer to:

- Eric Garcia (writer) (born 1972), American writer
- Eric García (footballer, born 1993), Spanish football midfielder
- Eric Garcia (basketball) (born 1994), American basketball player
- Eric García (footballer, born 2001), Spanish football defender for Barcelona

== See also ==
- Érica García (born 1968), Argentine singer
