= Éric Geoffroy =

20th-century Islamic scholar and philosopher from France (born 1956)

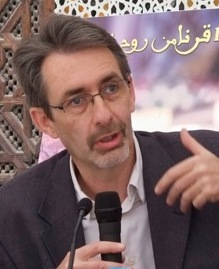
- Born: 1956 (age 69–70); Belfort, France

Philosophical work
- Era: 20th-century philosophy
- Region: Perennial philosophy
- School: Sufism
- Main interests: Sufism, poetry, philosophy, sociology, modernity in Islam
- Notable ideas: L'Islam sera spirituel ou ne sera plus (Islam shall be spiritual or shall be no more) Contemplative Jihad (an expression of the Greater Jihad i.e. the Jihad against one's own ego) Islam in Post-modernity; Universal dimension of Islam

Éric Geoffroy (born 1956) is a French philosopher, islamologist, writer and scholar in the Sufi studies teaching at the University of Strasbourg.

== Thought ==
He is a critic of the notion of a Clash of Civilizations, which he transcends into a Dialogue of Traditions He is an affiliate of the Alawiya Sufi Brotherhood.

== Bibliography ==
- 2010 : Abd el-kader : un spirituel dans la modernité (direction), Albouraq, Paris.
- 2009 : L'islam sera spirituel ou ne sera plus, Seuil, Paris.
- 2009 : Le soufisme, voie intérieure de l'islam, Seuil (coll. Points-Sagesses) : version poche de Initiation au soufisme, éd. Fayard, 2003.
- 2009 : Le grand livre des prénoms arabes, Albouraq / Albin Michel, Paris (en collaboration avec Néfissa Geoffroy).
- 2005 : Une voie soufie dans le monde : la Shâdhiliyya. actes du colloque organisé par E. Geoffroy à la Bibliotheca Alexandrina en avril 03. Paris, Maisonneuve & Larose, 30 contributeurs, 550 p.
- 2003 : Initiation au soufisme, éd. Fayard, Paris. Réédité en 2004 et en 2007. Traductions en arabe (chez Kalima Translation, Abou Dhabi – Beyrouth, 2010) et en anglais (World Wisdom, USA, 2010).
- 2000 : L'instant soufi, Actes Sud.
- 1998 : La sagesse des maîtres soufis, éditions Grasset, Paris : présentation et traduction des Latâ'if al-minan d'Ibn 'Atâ' Allâh. Traduit en espagnol (Mandala Ediciones, Madrid, 2008).
- 1997 : Jihâd et contemplation - Vie et enseignement d'un soufi au temps des croisades, éditions Dervy, Paris. (réédition corrigée chez Albouraq en 2003).
- 1995 : Le soufisme en Egypte et en Syrie sous les derniers Mamelouks et les premiers Ottomans : orientations spirituelles et enjeux culturels, thèse publiée par l'Institut Français d'Etudes Arabes de Damas, Damas-Paris, 595 p. (disponible à la librairie de l'Institut du Monde Arabe, et bientôt on line sur le site de l'IFPO).
