= Erik Nielson (academic) =

American academic

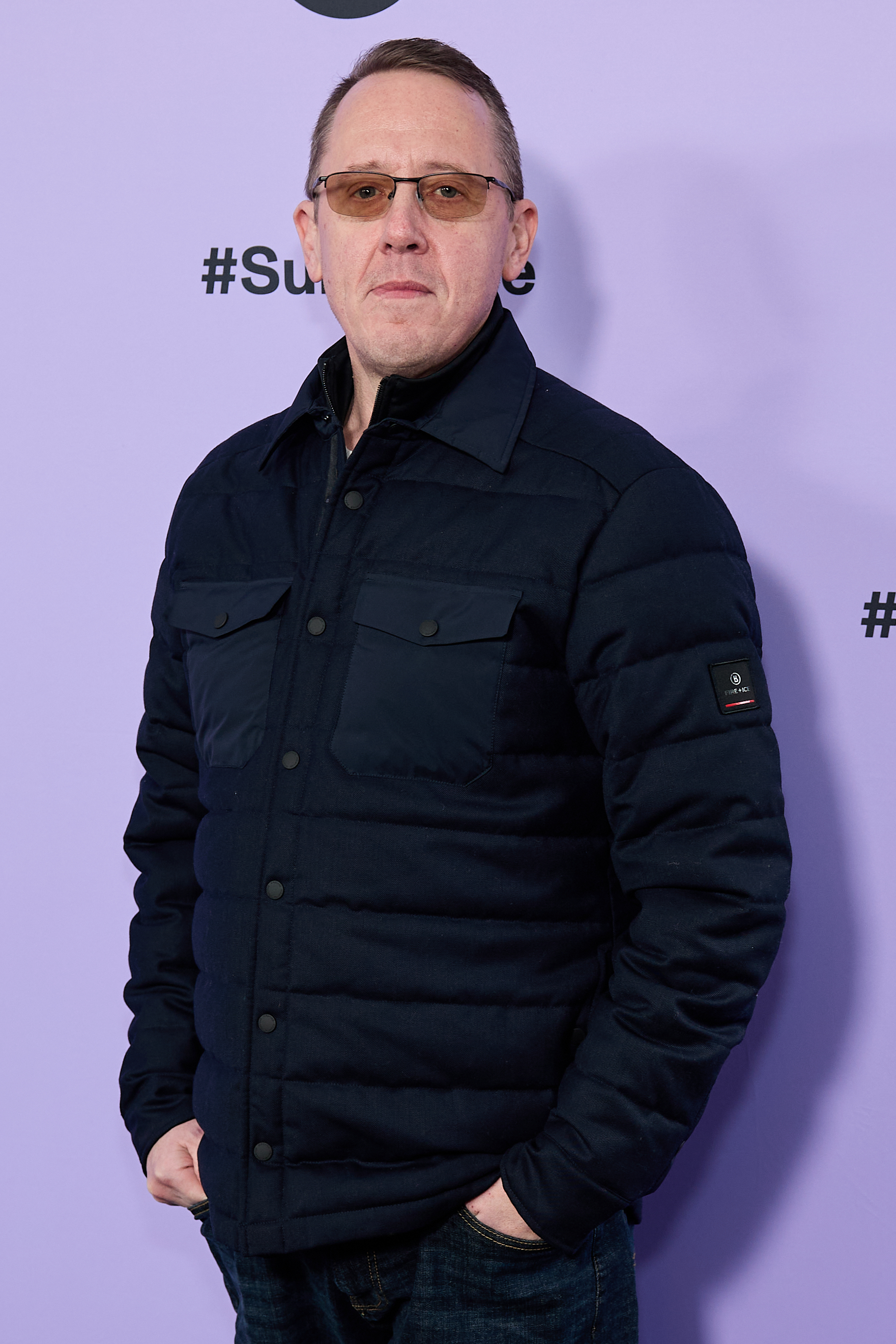
Erik Nielson at the premiere of the documentary As we speak during the 2024 Sundance Film Festival

Erik Nielson is a professor of Liberal Arts at the University of Richmond who has become well known as an expert in the use of rap music as evidence in criminal trials.

== Early life and education ==
Nielson graduated with a B.A. in Interdisciplinary Studies (Echols Scholar) from the University of Virginia in 1998. He further pursued education at the University College London, earning a M.A. in English in 2001, and a Ph.D. in English from the University of Sheffield in 2011. His dissertation at the University of Sheffield was titled "Under Surveillance: The Evolution of Black Arts in the United States."

== Career ==
His book Rap on Trial: Race, Lyrics, and Guilt in America, with co-author Andrea Dennis, was published in November 2019 and received the Hugh Hefner Foundation First Amendment Award in October 2020. He was a consulting producer and interviewed for the Emmy-nominated documentary As We Speak: Rap Music on Trial, which premiered at the Sundance Film Festival in January 2024 and distributed by Paramount + starting on February 27, 2024. He has served as an expert in court cases, and his testimony has been cited to exclude rap lyric evidence.

Nielson's research focuses on the relationship between African-American culture and policing, as well as the relationship between hip hop and politics. He has written for the New York Times and other mainstream news outlets on these issues. He was the lead author of four amicus briefs with the US Supreme Court, three of which were jointly submitted with his frequent collaborator, Killer Mike. Nielson and Travis L. Gosa edited The Hip Hop & Obama Reader.

Nielson received the Distinguished Educator and the Distinguished Scholar Awards at the University of Richmond.
