= Erik Salumäe =

Estonian politician (born 1970)

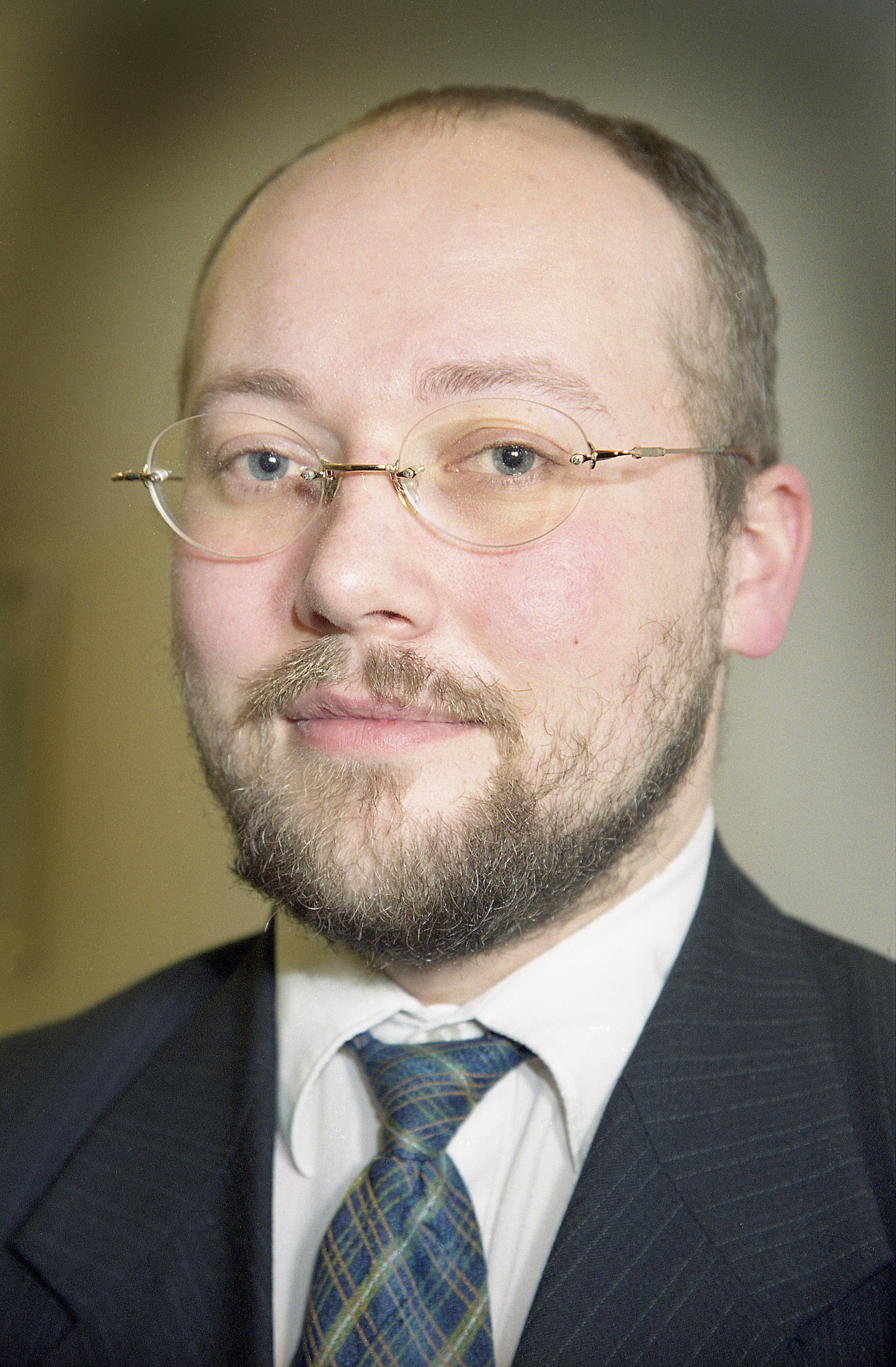
Erik Salumäe in 1999

Erik Salumäe (born 5 May 1970 in Kuressaare) is an Estonian politician. He was a member of XI Riigikogu.

== See also ==
- Politics of Estonia
