= Eric Olson =

Eric or Erik Olson or Olsen may refer to:

- Eric N. Olson (born 1955), biochemist and molecular biologist
- Eric T. Olson (born 1952), retired admiral in the United States Navy and former commander of United States Special Operations Command
- Eric T. Olson (philosopher), philosopher and lecturer specializing in metaphysics and philosophy of mind
- Eric Christian Olsen (born 1977), American actor
- Eric Olsen (writer) (born 1958), author, writer and founder of Blogcritics
- Eric Olsen (American football) (born 1988), National Football League player
- Eric Olsen (sailor) (1916-1993), American Olympic sailor
- Erik Olson (1901–1986), Swedish painter, surrealist
- Erik Olson (American football) (born 1977), American football defensive back
- Eric Olsen (businessman), French-American businessman
- Erik Olson (runner) (born 1992), American middle- and long-distance runner, 2014 All-American for the Stanford Cardinal track and field team
