= Eric Gray (photographer) =

British photographer

Eric Gray was a stills photographer whose work was featured in Picture Post. His career was mainly in the British film industry and it was based on two Anthony Asquith pictures, Shooting Stars (1927) and A Cottage on Dartmoor (1929), that his reputation began to emerge. During this period stills were normally etched with his signature written in an art deco style.

Gray was educated at Whitgift School in Croydon, Surrey. He operated his own studio at 17 Rupert Street close to the Trocadero in central London between 1931 and 1940 and his camera studies included Chili Bouchier and Harry Milton (assistant director on Bitter Sweet).

During the Second World War, he joined the Royal Observer Corps from 1939 to 1945. In 1941, he was hired as a stills photographer on Michael Powell and Emeric Pressburger's One of Our Aircraft is Missing and a selection of these photographs was used to promote the film in Britain and America. Four years later, Gray was again working with Powell and Pressburger. A Matter of Life and Death (US title Stairway to Heaven) was filmed at Denham Studios and on location in Devon. Gray was the main stills photographer working behind the scenes on location at Saunton Sands in Devon, while Fred Daniels focused on gallery portraits in the studio. Both were credited as creating the most iconic images of the wartime romantic drama starring David Niven and Kim Hunter. Their work was published in the film classic series. In 1948, the British Film Academy arranged the first public exhibition on the art of still photography in feature films and documentary film. The exhibition was also supported by the film union A.C.T. and marked a greater understanding and appreciation of their work as opposed to enlargements from motion picture frames. Gray chose to submit stills from A Matter of Life and Death, which were approved by the committee including Michael Powell and Roger Manvell.

In the 1950s, Gray worked with the Hollywood director John Huston on Moulin Rouge (1952) and Beat the Devil. Both were filmed at Shepperton Studios in England. In the latter part of his career, Gray was hired to create studio portraits of Humphrey Bogart and a blonde haired Jennifer Jones. Other notable stills in a long career included Room at the Top in 1959. His portrait of Laurence Harvey was featured in John Kobal's study of Portraits of the British Cinema.

== Sources ==
- A Matter of Life and Death adapted by Eric Warman and published by World Film Publications 1946
- The Archers Powell and Pressburger Portraits/Portrety Fred Daniels, published 2012 by Fundacja Twarda Sztuka ISBN 978 83 930435 21
- A Matter of Life and Death by Ian Christie, published 2000 by BFI ISBN 0851704794
- Exhibition of British Film Stills published by British Film Academy. A copy is held at BFI Reuben Library.
- Portraits of the British Cinema by John Kobal and John Russell Taylor published 1985 ISBN 0 88162 151 X
- Life feature on Stairway to Heaven, 9 December 1946
