= Eric Stehr =

German politician (born 2001)

Member of the Landtag of Saxony-Anhalt
- Incumbent
- Assumed office 6 October 2026

Personal details
- Born: 2001 (age 24–25)
- Party: Die Linke (since 2021)

Eric Roman Stehr (born 2001) is a German politician who was elected member of the Landtag of Saxony-Anhalt in 2026. He has served as deputy chairman of Die Linke in Saxony-Anhalt since 2024.
