= Eric Christensen (visual effects supervisor) =

Eric Christensen (born March 12, 1969) is an American Visual Effects Supervisor and Chief Executive Officer of two Visual Effects Companies.

Christensen was born in Redding, California. Christensen quit ILM to form his own company, "RotoFactory" in 2006 to offer other visual effects shops in the United States an opportunity to keep their 2D outsourcing domestic. In 2010, Christensen expanded into New Orleans, Louisiana, to offer expanded services to the motion picture studios as well as a tax incentive allowed by the state. Christensen's Factory VFX also began training programs to assist New Orleans residents in developing a new industry, working with both government programs and local non-profits,

Aside from his Visual Effects film-work, Christensen also runs three additional companies all under the banner of Christensen Media Services that includes television production, digital and print publications.
