= Eriksson =

- Pronunciation: [ˈêːrɪkˌsɔn]

Origin
- Origin: Old Norse
- Meaning: "son of Erik"

Other names
- Variant forms: Eriksen, Erikson

Eriksson is a common Swedish patronymic surname meaning "son of Erik", itself an Old Norse given name. There are other spelling variations of this surname (123 228 people in Sweden) such as Erikson (419), Ericson (3 442), Ericsson (5 730) and Erixon (55). Erikson is uncommon as a given name. Notable people with the surname include:

- Amalia Eriksson (1824–1923), Swedish businesswoman
- Anders Eriksson, born 1975, Swedish ice hockey player
- Anders Eriksson, born 1985, Swedish ice hockey player
- Anna Eriksson (born 1977), Finnish musician
- Åsa Eriksson (born 1972), Swedish politician
- Charlotta Eriksson (1794–1862), Swedish actress
- Clas Eriksson, Swedish ice hockey player
- Dan-Ola Eriksson (born 1963), Swedish curler
- Erik Homburger Erikson (1902–1994), developmental psychologist and psychoanalyst
- Felix Eriksson (ice hockey) (born 1992), Swedish professional ice hockey player
- Fredrik Eriksson, Swedish ice hockey player
- Gösta Eriksson (1931–2024), Swedish rower
- Gösta Eriksson (rowing) (1900–1970), Swedish rowing coxswain
- Håkan Eriksson, Swedish ice hockey player
- Hans-Erik Eriksson (born 1961), Swedish computer scientist
- Harry Eriksson (1892–1957), Swedish diplomat
- Helena Eriksson (born 1962), Swedish poet
- Henrik Eriksson, Swedish ice hockey player
- Jan Eriksson, Swedish ice hockey player
- Jennie Bergius Eriksson (born 1981), Swedish politician
- Joacim Eriksson, Swedish ice hockey player
- Jonas Eriksson, several people
- Kalle Eriksson (born 2004), Canadian para-alpine skier
- Kenneth Eriksson (born 1956), Swedish rally driver
- Lars Eriksson, several people
- Leif Eriksson (Leifr Eiríksson) (c. 970 – c. 1020), Icelandic-born Norse explorer, son of Erik the Red
- Lena Eriksson (born 1972), Swedish breaststroke swimmer
- Lennart Eriksson (born 1956), Swedish musician (Ebba Grön).
- Loui Eriksson, Swedish ice hockey player
- Magdalena Eriksson, Swedish footballer
- Magnus Eriksson, Swedish ice hockey player
- Marcus Eriksson, Swedish ice hockey player
- Matz Robert Eriksson (born 1972), Swedish drummer
- Mollie Eriksson (born 2000) Swedish footballer
- Peter Eriksson, Swedish ice hockey player
- Sanne Lennström (née Eriksson) (born 1988), Swedish politician
- Sebastian Eriksson (born 1989), Swedish footballer
- Simon Eriksson (born 2006), Swedish footballer
- Sven-Göran Eriksson (1948–2024), Swedish football manager
- Sven-Olov Eriksson (1929–1999), Swedish runner
- Thomas Eriksson, Swedish ice hockey player
- Tim Eriksson, Swedish ice hockey player
- Ursula and Sabina Eriksson, born in Sunne, Sweden, are Swedish identical twins, who survived suicide attempts by being run over by motorway traffic in front of the Police and Highway authorities, with Sabina committing manslaughter the following day, in the UK in 2008

== See also ==
- Ericsson (surname)
- Erikson
- Erickson (surname)
- Jacob Ericksson (1967–2025), Swedish actor
- Derrickson
