= Ericsson (disambiguation) =

Ericsson is a Swedish telecommunications equipment manufacturer.

Ericsson or Ericson may also refer to:

== Companies ==
- Ericson Yachts, a former builder of fiberglass yachts
- Ericsson Mobile Platforms, a company providing cellular platforms technology
- Sony Ericsson, a joint venture between Sony Corporation and Ericsson
- LG-Ericsson, a joint venture between LG and Ericsson
- Ericsson Hewlett Packard Telecom, a Swedish consortium

== Places ==
=== United States ===
- Ericsson, Minneapolis, Minnesota
- Ericson, Nebraska

== Other uses ==
- Ericson Alexander Molano (born 1979), Colombian Gospel singer
- Ericsson cycle, a thermodynamic cycle
- Caloric ship Ericsson, a ship built in 1852 using an engine based on the Ericsson cycle
- Ericsson Open, a former name of the Miami Masters tennis tournament
- USS Ericsson, warships in the United States Navy
- Ericsson Globe, a sports arena in Stockholm named after the company Ericsson
- Ericson (footballer), Brazilian footballer

== See also ==
- Ericsson (surname)
- Eriksson, a common Swedish patronymic surname
- Erickson (disambiguation)
- Ericsson Stadium (disambiguation)
