= Senator Ericson =

Senator Ericson, Ericksen, or Erickson may refer to:

- C. J. A. Ericson, Iowa State Senate
- E. W. Ericson (1858–1951), South Dakota State Senate
- Edward Charles Ericson (1856–1910), South Dakota State Senate
- Doug Ericksen (born 1969), Washington State Senate
- Edgar C. Erickson (1896–1989), Massachusetts State Senate
- Edwin Erickson (1938–2019), Pennsylvania State Senate
- John E. Erickson (Montana politician) (1863–1946), U.S. Senator from Montana
- LeRoy Erickson (1926–1997), North Dakota State Senate
- Oscar E. Erickson (1884–1945), North Dakota State Senate
- Renee Erickson (politician) (born 1964), Kansas State Senate
- Ron Erickson (born 1933), Montana State Senate
