= Fredrik Eriksson =

Fredrik Eriksson may refer to:

- Fredrik Eriksson (ice hockey, born 1983), Swedish ice hockey defenceman
- Fredrik Eriksson (ice hockey, born 1980), Swedish ice hockey goaltender
- Fredrik Eriksson (politician), Swedish politician

== See also ==
- Fredrik Ericsson, Swedish mountaineer and extreme skier
- Fredrik Ericsson (cyclist), Swedish cyclist
- Freddie Eriksson (born 1981), Swedish motorcycle speedway rider
