= Anders Eriksson =

Anders Eriksson may refer to:

- Anders Eriksson (comedian) (born 1956), Swedish comedian and actor
- Anders Eriksson (Norrköping curler) (born 1956), Swedish curler from Norrköping
- Anders Eriksson (Karlstad curler) (born 1982), Swedish curler from Karlstad
- Anders Eriksson (footballer) (born 1965), Finnish footballer
- Anders Eriksson (ice hockey, born 1975), Swedish professional ice hockey player
- Anders Eriksson (ice hockey, born 1985), Swedish professional ice hockey player
- Anders Eriksson (enduro rider) (born 1973), Swedish enduro rider
- Anders Eriksson Hästehufvud (1577–1657), Swedish officer and governor
- Anders Eriksson (speedway rider) (1960–2002), Swedish speedway rider

== See also ==
- K. Anders Ericsson, Swedish psychologist professor
- Eriksson (surname)
