= Eiriksson =

Eiriksson or Eiríksson is a patronymic that can refer to the following:

- Magnús Eiríksson (1806–1881), Icelandic theologian
- Harald Eiriksson, Earl of Orkney (1191–1194)
- Eyvindur P. Eiríksson (born 1935), Icelandic writer
- Håkon Eiriksson (died c. 1030), Earl of Lade
- Leif Ericson (Old Norse: Leifr Eiríksson) (c. 970–c. 1020), Norse explorer
- Thorvald Eriksson (Old Icelandic: Þorvaldr Eiríksson), son of Erik the Red
- Rögnvald Eriksson (or Ragnvald Eiriksson; c. 920–933)), son of Erik Bloodaxe

== See also ==
- Eriksen (surname)
- Erikson
