= Eriksen (surname) =

- Pronunciation: ER-ik-sen

Origin
- Origin: Old Norse
- Meaning: "son of Erik"

Other names
- Variant forms: Erikson, Eriksson

Eriksen is a common Danish and Norwegian patronymic surname meaning "son of Erik", itself an Old Norse given name. The spelling forms Ericksen, Erichsen, Ericson, Erikzen, are cognates. People with the surname Eriksen and its cognates include:

== Eriksen ==
- Adam Eriksen (1852–1931), Norwegian painter
- Beate Eriksen (born 1960), Norwegian actress and film director
- Birger Eriksen (1875–1958), Norwegian military officer
- Bjarne Eriksen (businessman) (1886–1976), Norwegian businessman
- Bruce Eriksen (1928–1997), Canadian artist and social activist
- Christian Eriksen (born 1992), Danish footballer
- Dagrun Eriksen (born 1971), Norwegian politician
- Edvard Eriksen (1876–1959), Danish-Icelandic sculptor
- Eivind Kristoffer Eriksen (1893–1949), Norwegian politician
- Eline Eriksen (1881–1963), Danish model for the Little Mermaid statue in Copenhagen, Denmark
- Erik Eriksen (1902–1972), Prime Minister of Denmark
- Geir Eriksen (born 1965), Norwegian con artist
- Harald Eriksen (gymnast) (1888–1968), Norwegian gymnast
- Hege R. Eriksen (born 1965), Norwegian professor
- Inge Eriksen (1935–2015), Danish writer and political activist
- Ingvald Eriksen (1884–1961), Danish gymnast
- Ivar Eriksen (born 1942), Norwegian speed skater
- Jens Eriksen (born 1969), Danish badminton player
- Jens Juul Eriksen (1926–2004), Danish cyclist
- John Eriksen (1957–2002), Danish footballer
- Kaj-Erik Eriksen (born 1979), Canadian television actor
- Kristian Eriksen (born 1995), Norwegian footballer
- Lars-Erik Eriksen (born 1954), Norwegian cross country skier
- Louise Eriksen (born 1995), Danish footballer
- Mads Eriksen (born 1977), Norwegian cartoonist
- Marius Eriksen (1886–1950), Norwegian gymnast
- Mikkel S. Eriksen, songwriter and record producer at Stargate
- Morten Eriksen (born 1983), Norwegian footballer
- Nils Eriksen (1911–1975), Norwegian footballer
- Odd Eriksen (1955–2023), Norwegian politician
- Olle Johan Eriksen (1923–1999), Norwegian politician
- Preben Eriksen (born 1958), Danish speedway rider
- Rita Eriksen (born 1966), Norwegian singer
- Rosa Eriksen (born 1990), Danish politician
- Rune Eriksen (born 1974), Norwegian musician
- Stein Eriksen (1927–2015), Norwegian-American alpine skier
- Synnøve Eriksen (born 1963), Norwegian novelist
- Thomas Bruun Eriksen (born 1979), Danish road bicycle racer
- Thomas Hylland Eriksen (1962–2024), Norwegian anthropologist, professor, and author
- Torun Eriksen (born 1977), Norwegian singer

== Ericksen ==
- Andy Ericksen (1894–1973), Australian rules footballer
- Bruce Werner Ericksen, an alias used by American bank robber and con man, Benjamin Hoskins Paddock
- Charles Ericksen (1875–1916), Norwegian-American wrestler
- Doug Ericksen (1969–2021), American politician
- E. E. Ericksen (1882–1967), American philosopher
- Joan N. Ericksen (born 1954), American judge
- Robert Ericksen (born 1945), Holocaust historian

== Erichsen ==
- Bente Erichsen (born 1949), Norwegian culture director
- Eivind Erichsen (1917–2005), Norwegian economist
- Fie Udby Erichsen (born 1985), Danish rower
- Freja Beha Erichsen (born 1987), Danish model
- John Eric Erichsen (1818–1896), Danish-born British surgeon
- Ludvig Mylius-Erichsen (1872–1907), Danish explorer of the Arctic
- Tinius Nagell-Erichsen (1934–2007), Norwegian publisher

== Fictional characters ==
- Marshall Eriksen, fictional character in the American TV series How I Met Your Mother, played by actor Jason Segel

== See also ==
- Erik
- Erikson
- Eriksson
- Ericsson (disambiguation)
- Erickson (disambiguation)
