= Erickson =

Erickson may refer to:

== Places ==
=== Canada ===
- Erickson, British Columbia, an unincorporated area
- Erickson, Manitoba, formerly a town
- Municipality of Clanwilliam-Erickson, Manitoba

=== United States ===
- Erickson Corner, Connecticut, an unincorporated community
- Erickson Landing, Michigan, an unincorporated community
- Erickson, Kenya, an unincorporated community

== Other uses ==
- Erickson (surname)
- Erickson Inc., American aircraft manufacturer and operator
- Erickson Living, American operator and developer of retirement communities

== See also ==
- Ericson or Ericsson (disambiguation)
- Erikson (disambiguation)
