= Statue of John Ericsson =

Sculpture by Jonathan Scott Hartley in New York City, U.S.

John Ericsson
- The statue in 2011
- Interactive map of John Ericsson
- Location: The Battery, New York City, New York, United States
- Coordinates: 40°42′13″N 74°00′52″W
- Designer: Jonathan Scott Hartley
- Type: Statue
- Material: Bronze
- Length: 8 feet (2.4 m)
- Width: 8 feet (2.4 m)
- Height: Statue: 8 feet 7 inches (2.62 m); Pedestal: 7 feet 11 inches (2.41 m)
- Completion date: 1903

John Ericsson is a Heroic-Scale bronze statue depicting John Ericsson, and is located in Battery Park in New York City.

== History ==
The statue depicts the esteemed Swedish-American engineer and inventor John Ericsson (1803–1889), who helped to revolutionize military-maritime technology with his ironclad warship, the USS Monitor.

Less than four years after Ericsson's death, sculptor Jonathan Scott Hartley (1845–1912) was commissioned by the state of New York to create a larger-than-life bronze portrait of Ericsson, which was dedicated 26 April 1893 in Battery Park. The pedestal was designed by architect Frank Wallis; Hartley and Wallis also collaborated on the Algernon Sydney Sullivan Memorial, unveiled in Van Cortlandt Park in 1906. Ten years later the sculptor, dissatisfied with his first version, crafted a modified statue, cast at the local Roman Bronze Works, and dedicated on 1 August 1903, a day after the centennial of Ericsson’s birth.

The modified statue predates the John Ericsson Memorial in Washington, D.C. by 13 years.

The statue is located on the perimeter of Battery Park, on State Street, across from Bridge Street. Over time the monument suffered extensive damage, the result of weathering, vandalism, and even a fire. In 1996 the sculpture was conserved by Parks’ monuments crew, and as part of overall improvements to Battery Park, the sculpture is slated to be moved from its present location to a more prominent site near a perimeter entrance.

== Physical description ==
The figure (heroic scale) depicts Ericsson standing, holding a model of the USS Monitor in his hand. The bronze figure is 8'7"(2.6m) tall, atop a 7'11"(2.4) polished black diamond granite pedestal. Each side of the pedestal has bronze plaques with dimensions of 1'x2'3.5"(0.3mx0.7m) that illustrate significant naval battles involving the Monitor and Princeton, as well as an array of Ericsson’s mechanical inventions. The right side of the plinth is signed by the sculptor, and reads "J.S. Hartley 1902".

On the front of the pedestal the name "Ericsson" is engraved. On the back of the pedestal, it reads:

The City of New York Erects this statue to the memory of a citizen whose genius has contributed to the greatness of the republic and the progress of the world.

April 26, 1893

On July 31 1803 John Ericsson was Born in Långbanshyttan Sweden Died in New York March 8 1889
