= Erixson =

Erixson is a surname. Notable people with the surname include:

- Irma Erixson (born 1937), Swedish actress, daughter of Sven
- Sven Erixson (1899–1970), Swedish painter and sculptor

== See also ==
- Erikson
