= Ericsson (surname) =

Swedish surname

Ericsson or Ericson is a Swedish patronymic surname meaning "son of Eric". Notable people with the surname include:

- Anders Ericsson (1947–2020), Swedish psychology professor and researcher, famous for his work on deliberate practice
- Aprille Ericsson (1963), American aerospace engineer
- Bo Ericson (athlete) (1919–1970), Swedish hammer thrower
- Devon Ericson, American actress
- Eric Ericson (1918–2013), Swedish conductor
- Eric Ericson (actor) (born 1974), Swedish actor
- George E. Ericson (1902–1980), American farmer and politician
- Georg Ericson (1919–2002), Swedish footballer and coach
- Gunnar Ericsson (1919–2013), Swedish businessman and politician
- Gunvor G. Ericson (born 1960), Swedish politician
- Hans-Ola Ericsson (born 1958), composer and organist
- John Ericson (1926–2020), German-American actor and film and television star
- John Ericsson (1803–1889), Swedish inventor and mechanical engineer, designer of the USS Monitor
- Jonathan Ericsson (born 1984), Swedish ice hockey player
- Jörgen Ericsson (born 1953), Swedish Navy rear admiral
- Kalle Ericsson (born 2004), Canadian para-alpine skier
- Karolina Ericsson (born 1973), Swedish badminton player
- Lars Magnus Ericsson (1846–1926), Swedish inventor and founder of the telecommunications company Ericsson
- Lars-Ivar Ericson (born 1948), Swedish Centre Party politician
- Leif Ericson (970–1020), Icelandic explorer, and first European to discover North America
- Marcus Ericsson (born 1990), Swedish race car driver
- Martin Ericsson (born 1980), Swedish footballer for IF Elfsborg
- Nils Ericson (1802–1860), Swedish inventor and mechanical engineer
- Norman Ericson (1932–2011), American-Swedish teacher and Bible scholar
- Rolf Ericson (1922–1997), Swedish jazz trumpeter
- Stig H:son Ericson (1897–1985), Swedish Navy admiral and Marshal of the Realm
- Sven-Göran Eriksson (1948–2024), Swedish former football manager of England national team
- Ulrika Ericsson (born 1970), Swedish Playboy model and actress

== See also ==
- Erickson (surname)
- Eriksson
- Jacob Ericksson (1967–2025), Swedish actor
- Derrickson
