= Uni Health =

Uni Research department

Uni Research Health is a department in Uni Research, one of the largest research companies in Norway. The Research Director of Uni Research Health is Professor Hege R. Eriksen.

Uni Research Health has approximately 125 employees, most of them located in Bergen, Norway.

== Research units ==
The research and educational activities of Uni Health are concentrated in the following research units:

- Centre for Child and Adolescent Mental Health Research
- Child Protection Research Unit
- Dental Biomaterials: Adverse Reaction Unit
- GAMUT (the Grieg Academy Music Therapy Research Centre)
- HEMIL Centre (Research Centre for Health Promotion)
- National Centre for Emergency Primary Health Care
- Occupational and Environmental Medicine
- Research Unit for General Practice in Bergen
- Research Centre for Sick Leave and Rehabilitation
- Stress, Health and Rehabilitation (formerly the Research Unit of the Norwegian Network for Back Pain)
