= Erickson (surname) =

Erickson is a surname. Notable people with the surname include:

- Arthur Erickson (1924–2009), Canadian architect
- Bernie Erickson (born 1944), American football player
- Bill Erickson (1928–1987), American NCAA and National Professional Basketball League player
- Carl Erickson (illustrator) (1891–1958), American fashion and advertising illustrator
- Charles Telford Erickson (1867–1966), American preacher and founder of a farming school in Albania
- Dan Erickson (born 1984), American television screenwriter, showrunner, and producer
- Dennis Erickson (born 1947), American coach of the National Football League's San Francisco 49ers and Seattle Seahawks
- Duane Erickson, American politician
- Edwin Erickson (1938–2019), American politician
- Ethan Erickson (born 1973), American actor
- Hank Erickson (1907–1964), American Major League Baseball catcher for the Cincinnati Reds
- Heather Mae Erickson (born 1977), American artist
- Jocelyn Erickson (born 2003), American softball player
- John Erickson (historian) (1929–2002), British World War II historian
- John C. Erickson, American founder of Erickson Retirement Communities
- John E. Erickson (Montana politician) (1863–1946), American governor of Montana
- John E. Erickson (Wisconsin politician), National Basketball Association Milwaukee Bucks general manager and 1970 Republican nominee for the U.S. Senate
- John R. Erickson (born 1942), American author
- Keith Erickson (born 1944), American basketball player
- Leif Erickson (1911–1986), American actor
- LeRoy Erickson (1926–1997), North Dakota politician
- Louise Erickson (baseball) (1929–2016), All-American Girls Professional Baseball League player
- Louise Erickson (actress) (1928–2019), American radio and film actress
- Matt Erickson (born 1975), American baseball player and coach
- Millard Erickson (born 1932), American Evangelical theologian
- Milton H. Erickson (1901–1980), American psychiatrist specializing in medical hypnosis
- Nick Erickson (1870–1931), American United States Navy Medal of Honor recipient for action in the Spanish–American War
- Rica Erickson (1908–2009), Australian author and botanist
- Robert Erickson (1917–1997), American composer
- Roky Erickson (1947–2019), American musician
- Scott Erickson (born 1968), American Major League Baseball pitcher
- Steve Erickson (born 1950), American author
- Wendell Erickson (1925–2018), American educator and politician

== See also ==
- Ericsson (surname)
- Jacob Ericksson (1967–2025), Swedish actor
- Erikson
- Derrickson
