= Felix Eriksson =

Felix Eriksson may refer to:

- Felix Eriksson (ice hockey)
- Felix Eriksson (footballer)
