= Erikson (disambiguation) =

Erikson is a popular surname, and also refers to:

- Leif Erikson Day
- Erikson Institute
