= John B. Johnson (politician) =

American politician

Member of the South Dakota Senate from the 1st district
- In office 1923–1926
- Preceded by: E. W. Ericson
- Succeeded by: Ole Lawrence

Personal details
- Born: February 4, 1885 Dakota Territory, U.S.
- Died: May 18, 1985 (aged 100) Sacramento, California
- Party: Democratic
- Spouse: Olive
- Children: eight

John Bernhard Johnson (February 4, 1885 – May 18, 1985) was an American politician. He served in the South Dakota State Senate from 1923 to 1926.
