= Kelly Derrickson =

Canadian indigenous musician

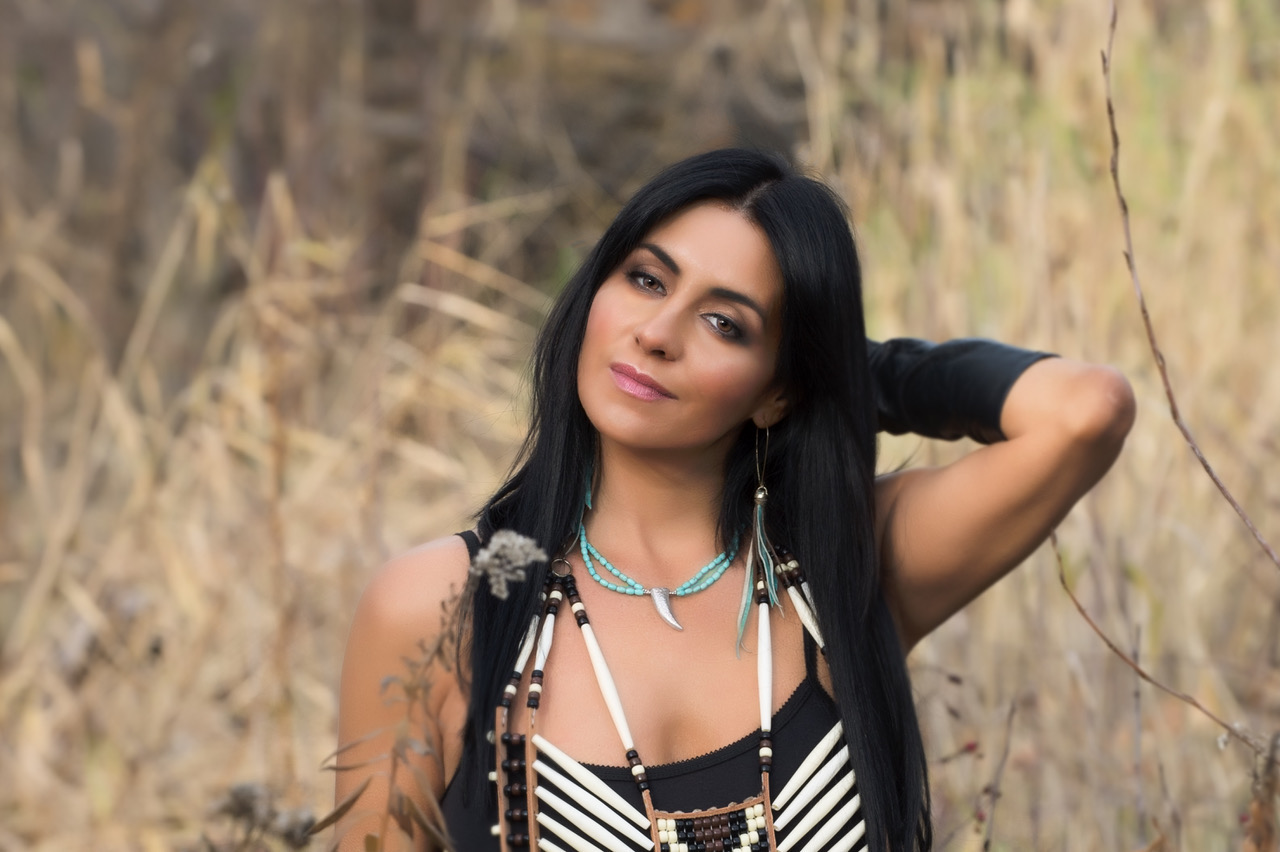

Background information
- Occupation: Singer-songwriter

Kelly Derrickson is an indigenous Canadian singer-songwriter from the Westbank First Nation in British Columbia. She is the daughter of Grand Chief Ronald Derrickson and Peggy Derrickson.

== Education ==
Derrickson studied music and earned her degree at the Berklee College of Music and went on to develop a musical style called Country Tribal Rock.

== Career ==
Her breakout hit was the 2013 recording of "Idle No More", where she "pays tribute to the struggles of aboriginal people in Canada. The anthem ties together issues from high suicide rates amongst First Nations to the exploitation of Canada's natural resources and environment."

Derrickson has won awards as both performer and songwriter. She won Best New Artist at the 2015 Indigenous Music Awards, and was named Best Female Artist by the Native American Music Awards for two consecutive years, in 2017 and 2018.

== Discography ==
- Amazing Grace (2014)
- Warriors of Love (2014)
- Christmas Without You (2016)
- I Am (2017)
- We Are Love (2019)
