= Fredrik Eriksson (politician) =

Swedish politician (born 1975)

Member of the Riksdag
- In office 22 December 2014 – 24 September 2018
- Constituency: Västra Götaland County West

Personal details
- Born: 12 November 1975 (age 50) Skaraborg County, Sweden
- Party: Sweden Democrats

Fredrik Eriksson (born 12 November 1975) is a Swedish politician and member of the Sweden Democrats party.

Eriksson studied at the University of Gothenburg and was employed in the healthcare industry before getting involved in politics. He served as group leader for the Sweden Democrats on the municipal council of Partille. Eriksson first became a member of the Riksdag in 2014 to stand in for party leader Jimmie Akesson who was on sick leave before becoming a full member of the Riksdag.
