= USS Ericsson =

USS Ericsson has been the name of three warships in the United States Navy. They are all named for John Ericsson, the designer of USS Monitor and a torpedo that was cable-powered by an external source. More recently, a support ship in the Military Sealift Command has been designated by his full name.

- USS Ericsson (TB-2), a torpedo boat, served from 1897 until 1912.
- USS Ericsson (DD-56), an O'Brien-class destroyer, served in the navy from 1915 until 1922. Transferred to the United States Coast Guard where she served from 1925 until 1932 as CG-5.
- USS Ericsson (DD-440), a Gleaves-class destroyer, served from 1941 until 1946.
- MS John Ericsson the Swedish American Line trans Atlantic passenger ship MS Kungsholm 1928–1941 was requisitioned by the US Government in 1942, renamed John Ericsson, and operated by the War Shipping Administration as a troop transport until returned to the line after the war and then sold to other lines.
- USNS John Ericsson (T-AO-194), a Henry J. Kaiser-class underway replenishment oiler operated by the Military Sealift Command to support ships of the United States Navy.
