= John Ericsson =

Swedish-American engineer (1803–1889)

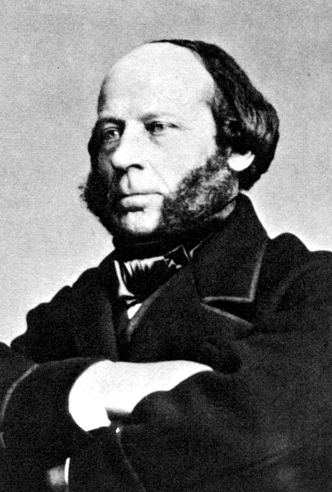
- Born: Johan Ericsson; July 31, 1803; Långban, Filipstad Municipality, Värmland County, Sweden
- Died: March 8, 1889 (aged 85); New York City, U.S.
- Citizenship: Sweden; United States (1848–1889)
- Known for: Ericsson cycle; Screw propeller; Torpedo
- Notable work: Novelty; USS Princeton; USS Monitor
- Relatives: Nils Ericson (brother)
- Awards: Rumford Prize (1862)

John Ericsson (born Johan Ericsson; July 31, 1803 – March 8, 1889) was a Swedish-American engineer and inventor. He was active in England and the United States.

Ericsson collaborated on the design of the railroad steam locomotive Novelty, which competed in the Rainhill Trials on the Liverpool and Manchester Railway, which were won by inventor George Stephenson's (1781–1848), Rocket. Later in North America, he designed the United States Navy's first screw-propelled steam frigate USS Princeton, in partnership with Captain (later Commodore) Robert F. Stockton (1795–1866) of the U.S. Navy, who unjustly blamed him for a fatal accident on the new vessel in 1844. A new partnership with Cornelius H. DeLamater (1821–1889), of the DeLamater Iron Works in New York City resulted in the first armored ironclad warship equipped with a rotating gun turret, USS Monitor, which dramatically saved the U.S. (Union Navy) naval blockading squadron from destruction by an ironclad Confederate States naval vessel, CSS Virginia, at the famous Battle of Hampton Roads at the southern mouth of the Chesapeake Bay (at the confluence of the James and Elizabeth Rivers) in March 1862, during the American Civil War (1861–1865).

== Early career ==
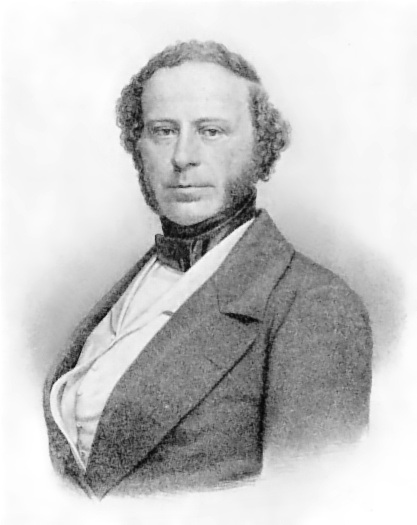
John Ericsson

Johan Ericsson was born at Långban in Filipstad Municipality, Värmland, in the Kingdom of Sweden. He was the younger brother of Nils Ericson, a distinguished canal and railway builder in Sweden. Their father Olof Ericsson had worked as the supervisor for a mine in Värmland. He had lost money in speculation and had to move his family to Forsvik in 1810. There he worked as a director of blastings during the excavation of the Swedish Göta Canal.

The extraordinary skills of the two Ericsson brothers were discovered by Baltzar von Platen (1766–1829), the architect of Göta Canal. They were dubbed 'cadets of mechanics' of the Swedish Royal Navy, and engaged as trainees at the canal enterprise. At the age of fourteen, John was already working independently as a surveyor. His assistant had to carry a footstool for him to reach the instruments during surveying work. At the age of seventeen he joined the Swedish army in Jämtland, serving in the Jämtland Ranger Regiment, as a Second Lieutenant, but was soon promoted to Lieutenant. He was sent to northern Sweden to do surveying, and in his spare time he constructed a heat engine which used the fumes from the fire instead of steam as a propellant. His skill and interest in mechanics made him resign from the army and move to England in 1826. However, his heat engine was not a success, as his prototype was designed to burn birchwood and would not work well with coal (the main fuel used in England).

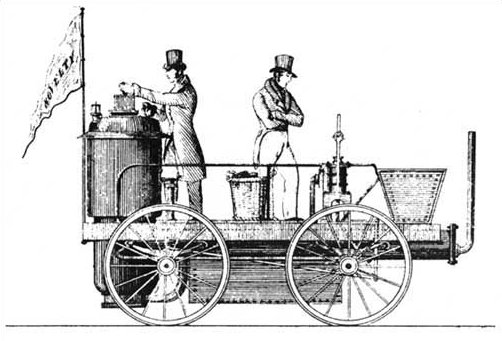
Novelty, Braithwaite and Ericsson's entry for the Rainhill Trials. Illustration from The Mechanics Magazine, 1829.

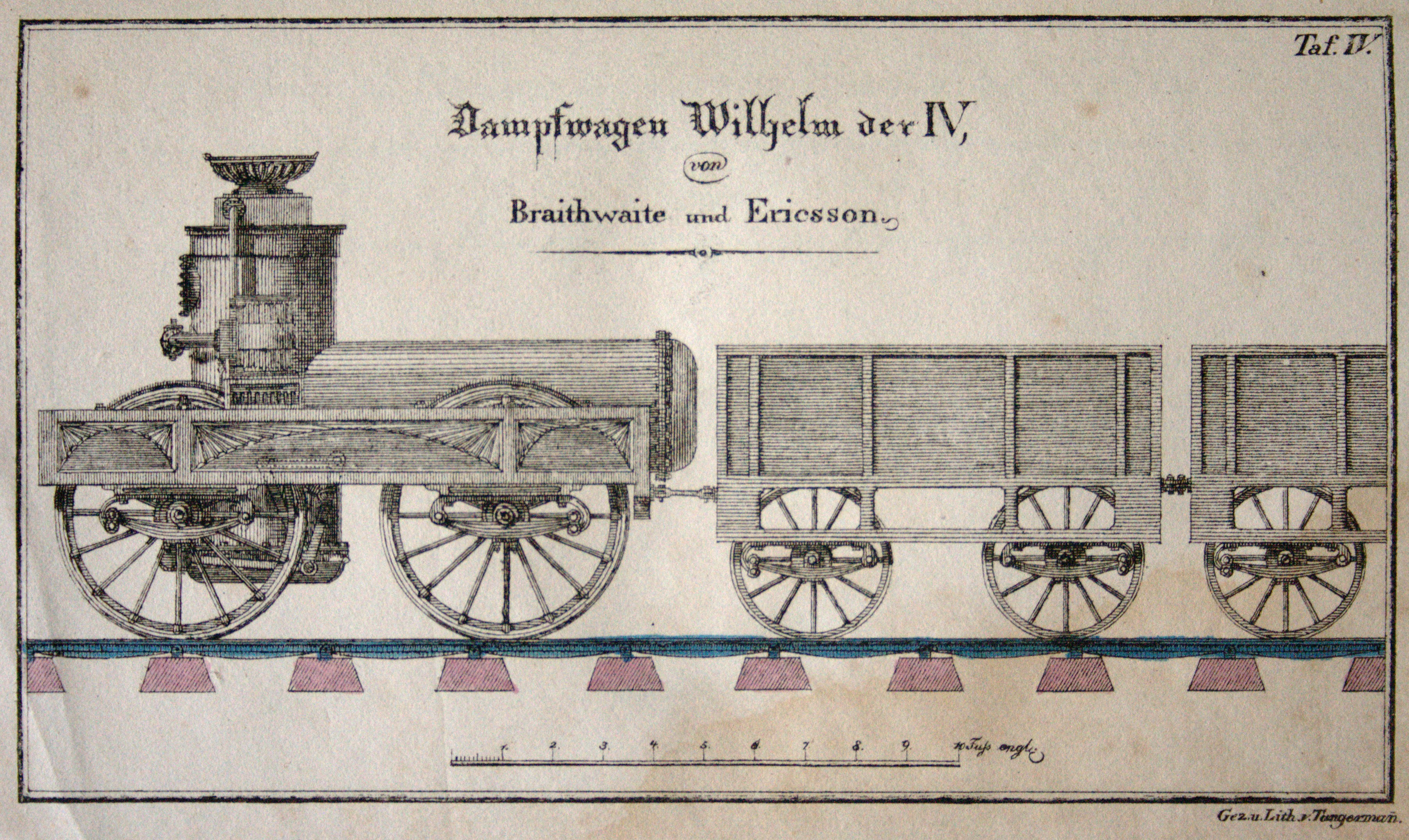
German drawing (1833) of the steam locomotive Wilhelm IV with scale in feet, built by "Braithwaite und Ericsson".

Notwithstanding the disappointment, he invented several other mechanisms instead based on steam, improving the heating process by incorporating bellows to increase oxygen supply to the fire bed. In 1829 he and English engineer John Braithwaite (1797–1870) built Novelty for the Rainhill Trials arranged by the Liverpool and Manchester Railway. It was widely praised but suffered recurring boiler problems, and the competition was won by English engineers George and Robert Stephenson with Rocket.

Two further engines were built by Braithwaite and Ericsson, named William IV and Queen Adelaide after the new king and queen. These were generally larger and more robust than Novelty and differed in several details (for example it is thought that a different design of blower was used which was an 'Induced Draught' type, sucking the gases from the fire). The pair ran trials on the Liverpool and Manchester Railway but the railway declined to purchase the new designs.

Their innovative steam fire engine proved an outstanding technical success by helping to quell the memorable Argyll Rooms fire on February 5, 1830 (where it worked for five hours when the other engines were frozen up), but was met with resistance from London's established 'Fire Laddies' and municipal authorities. An engine Braithwaite and Ericsson constructed for Sir John Ross's 1829 Arctic expedition failed and was dumped on the shores of Prince Regent Inlet. At this stage of Ericsson's career the most successful and enduring of his inventions was the surface condenser, which allowed a steamer to recover fresh water for its boilers while at sea. His 'deep sea lead,' a pressure-activated fathometer was another minor, but enduring success.

The commercial failure and development costs of some of the machines devised and built by Ericsson during this period put him into debtors' prison for an interval. At this time he also married 19-year-old Amelia Byam, a disastrous match that ended in the couple's separation until Amelia's death.

He was elected as a member to the American Philosophical Society in 1877.

== Education ==
His only formal education was a basic officer's education and training during his time in the Swedish Army, achieving the military rank of captain. On March 27, 1822, John passed a surveyor's examination in the Royal capital city of Stockholm. As a child he was taught to be a miner and surveyor by his father.

== Propeller design ==
He then improved ship design with two screw-propellers rotating in opposite directions (as opposed to earlier tests with this technology, which used a single screw). However, the British Admiralty of the Royal Navy disapproved of the invention in the late 1830s, which led to the fortunate contact with the prominent American naval captain (and later commodore) Robert Stockton (1795-1866), who had Ericsson design a propeller-driven steamer for him and invited him to bring his invention across the Atlantic Ocean to the United States of America, as it would supposedly be more welcomed in that more free-thinking place. As a result, Ericsson moved to New York City in 1839. Captain Stockton's plan was for Ericsson to oversee the development of a new class of naval warship of a larger heavier frigate with Stockton using his considerable political connections to grease the funding authorizations wheels. Finally, after the death of 9th President William Henry Harrison (1773-1841, served March-April 1841), and succession to the Presidency by his former Vice President John Tyler in the spring of 1841, funds were then allocated to the Navy under the new administration for a new design. However, they only received funding enough for a 700-ton Sloop-of-war design instead of a larger frigate. The sloop eventually became the USS Princeton, named after Stockton's hometown in New Jersey and the famous university located there.

The ship took about three years to complete and was perhaps the most advanced warship of its time. In addition to steam-powered twin screw propellers, it was originally designed to mount a 12-inch muzzle-loading gun on a revolving pedestal. The gun had also been designed by Ericsson and used hoop construction to pre-tension the breech, adding to its strength and allowing safe use of a larger charge. Other innovations on the warship design included a collapsible smoke funnel and an improved recoil system for the artillery.

The relations between Ericsson and Stockton had grown tense over time and, approaching the completion of the ship, Stockton began working to force Ericsson out of the shipbuilding project. Stockton carefully avoided letting outsiders know that Ericsson was the primary inventor. Stockton attempted to claim as much credit for himself as possible, even designing a second 12 in (300 mm) gun to be also mounted on the Princeton. Unfortunately, because Stockton did not totally understand the design of the first gun (originally named "The Orator", renamed "The Oregon" by Stockton), the second gun was fatally flawed.

When launched, the U.S.S. Princeton was an enormous success. On October 20, 1843, she won a speed trial against the huge passenger liner, paddle steamer SS Great Western, until then considered the fastest steamer afloat. Unfortunately, during a firing demonstration of Capt. Stockton's gun, the breech ruptured and exploded, killing visiting onboard observers of U.S. Secretary of State Abel P. Upshur and the Secretary of the Navy, Thomas Walker Gilmer (of the Presidential Cabinet of 10th President John Tyler, 1790-1862, served 1841-1845), as well as six others accompanying them. Stockton attempted to deflect the blame onto Ericsson, with moderate success, despite the fact Ericsson's gun was sound and it was instead Stockton's second gun that had failed. Stockton also refused to pay Ericsson, and by using his political connections, Stockton blocked the U.S. Navy bureaucracy from paying him.

== Friendship with Cornelius H. DeLamater ==
When Ericsson arrived from England and settled in New York City, he was persuaded by Samuel Risley of Greenwich Village to give his work to the Phoenix Foundry. There he met industrialist and iron / steel foundry owner Cornelius H. DeLamater (1821–1889), and soon a mutual attachment developed between the two. Rarely thereafter did Ericsson or DeLamater enter upon a business venture without first consulting the other." Personally, their friendship never faltered, though strained by the pressures of business and Ericsson's quick temper, DeLamater called Ericsson "John" and Ericsson called DeLamater by his middle nickname "Harry", intimacies almost unknown in Ericsson's other relationships. In time, the DeLamater Iron Works, situated facing the Hudson River on the waterfront / west end of West 13th Street in Lower Manhattan's westside, became known as the Asylum where Capt Ericsson had free rein to experiment and attempt new feats.

The Iron Witch was next constructed, the first iron steamboat. The first hot-air invention of Capt Ericsson was first introduced in the ship Ericsson, built entirely by DeLamater. The DeLamater Iron Works also launched the first submarine boat, first self-propelled torpedo, and first torpedo boat. When DeLamater died on February 2, 1889, Ericsson could not be consoled. Ericsson's own death only one month later in March 1889, was not surprising to his close friends and acquaintances."

Steamboat Iron Witch about 1846 by J. V. Cornell

== Hot air engine ==
Ericsson then proceeded to invent independently the caloric, or hot air, engine in the 1820s which used hot air, caloric in the scientific parlance of the day, instead of steam as a working fluid. A similar device had been patented earlier in 1816 by the Reverend Robert Stirling (1790-1878), whose technical priority of invention provides the usual term 'Stirling Engine' for the device. Ericsson's engine was not initially successful due to the differences in combustion temperatures between burning Swedish wood and firing of British coal. In spite of his setbacks, Ericsson was later awarded the Rumford Prize of the American Academy of Arts and Sciences in 1862 for his invention.

In 1830, Ericsson patented his second engine, that can work either with steam, air or water. This rotative engine objective is to reduce the engine within more convenient limits without any corresponding loss of power.

By 1833, Capt. Ericsson built his third engine, a hot air engine (or caloric engine) that is exhibited in London: "the engine will prove the most important mechanical invention ever conceived by the human mind, and one that will confer greater benefits on civilized life than any that has ever preceded it" (John O. Sargent). This engine included a regenerator that would inspire many other hot air engine inventors.

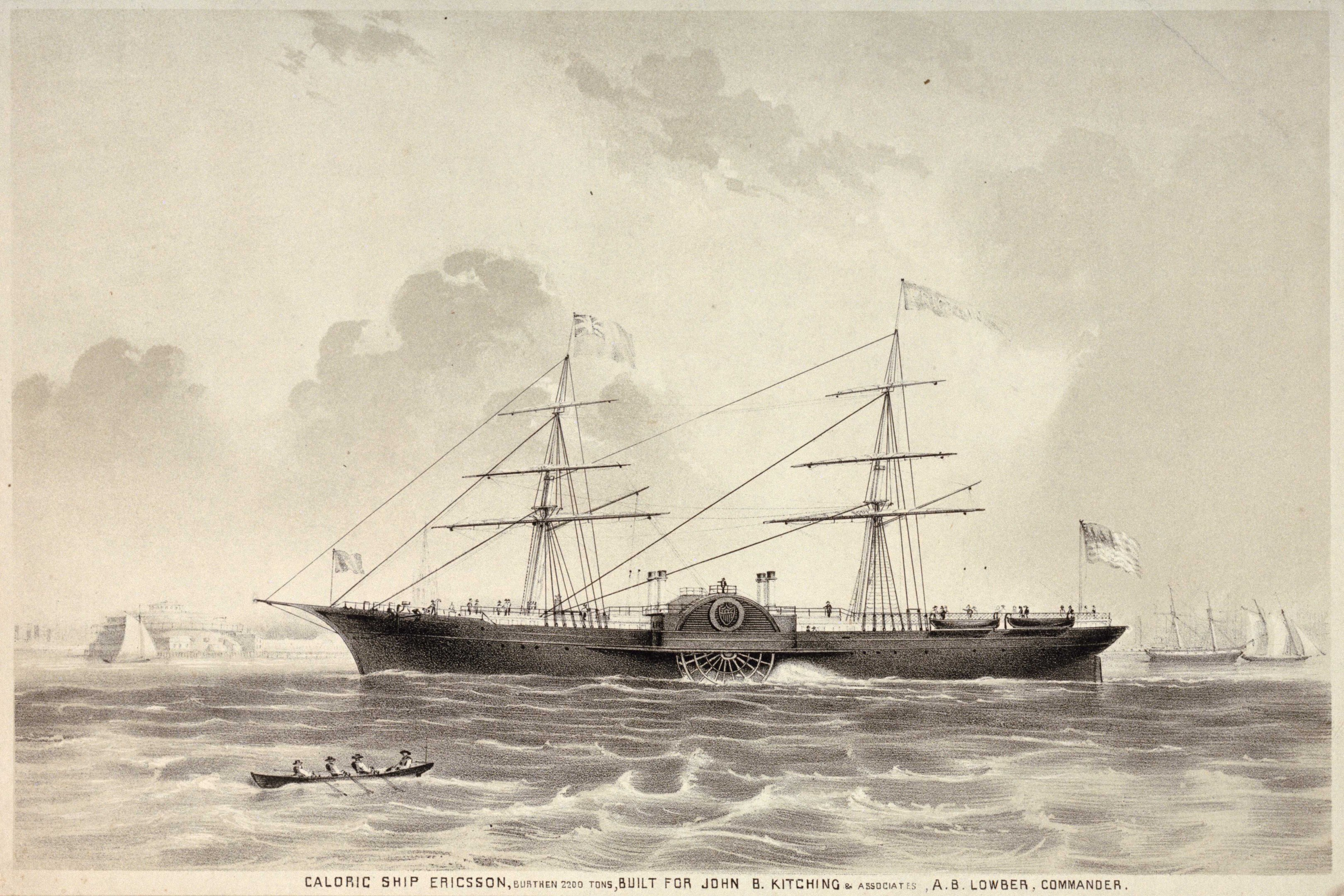
Caloric ship Ericsson, 2,200 tons burthen, built for John B Kitching and Associates, A B Lowber, Commander

The caloric ship, powered by the fourth Ericsson engine was built in 1852.

A group of New York merchants and financiers headed by John B Kitching, Edward Dunham, President of the Corn Exchange Bank, and G.B. Lamar, president of the Bank of the Republic, backed the project and in April, 1852, the keel of the ship was laid at the yard of Perine, Patterson, and Stack in Williamsburgh. At about the same time the construction of the engine was commenced by Messrs Hogg and Delamater. Hull and machinery were built in the greatest possible secrecy, both Ericsson and his financial backers being convinced that their ship would revolutionize ocean transport by its economy and safety, and that competitors would if possible copy the design of at least the engine. On September 15, 1852, the ship was launched and in November the engine was turned over at the dock under its own power. It would be a failure. Smaller experimental engines based on the same patent design and built before the caloric ship, however would prove to be working efficiently.

In his later years, the caloric engine would render Ericsson comfortably wealthy, as its boilerless design made it a much safer and more practical means of power for small industry than steam engines. Ericsson's incorporation of a 'regenerator' heat sink for his engine made it tremendously fuel-efficient. Apparently in the post Civil War era some time before or around 1882, from the publishing date, a ship was purchased by a Captain Charles L. Dingley called the Ericsson with a weight of 1,645 tons that was built by John Ericsson (Although the above section on John Ericsson's Friendship with Cornelius H. DeLamater says that the ship known as the Ericsson was built by the DeLamater Iron Works) to try out the hot air engine as a motive power in open ocean navigation.

Decades later, in 1883 John Ericsson built a solar air engine of 1 HP. The leading feature of the sun motor is that of concentrating the radiant heat by means of a rectangular trough having a curved bottom lined on the inside with polished plates, so arranged that they reflect the sun's rays toward a cylindrical heater placed longitudinally above the trough. This heater, it is scarcely necessary to state, contains the acting medium, steam or air, employed to transfer the solar energy to the motor; the transfer being effected by means of cylinders provided' with pistons and valves resembling those of motive engines of the ordinary type. Practical engineers, as well as scientists, have demonstrated that solar energy cannot be rendered available for producing motive power, in consequence of the feebleness of solar radiation.

== Ship design ==
On September 26, 1854, Ericsson presented Emperor Napoleon III of France with drawings of iron-clad armored battleships with a dome-shaped gun tower, and even though the French emperor praised this particular plan, Ericsson did nothing to bring it to practical application or to obtain and build such a revolutionary vessel for the French Navy. In 1851 he designed the Caloric ship Ericsson.

== USS Monitor ==
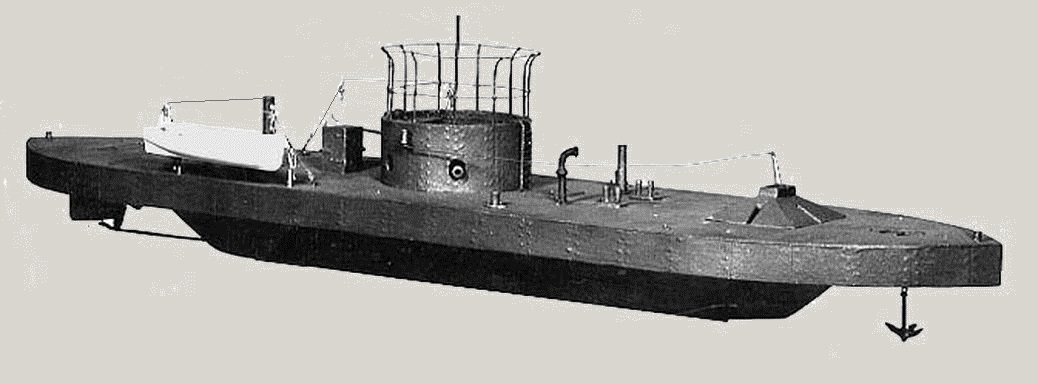
Replica of USS Monitor

Shortly after the American Civil War broke out in 1861, the Confederacy began constructing an ironclad ram upon the burnt hull hulk of the USS Merrimack which had been partially burned and then scuttled / sunk by evacuating Federal troops before it was captured by militia forces loyal to the local Commonwealth of Virginia. Nearly concurrently, the United States Congress had recommended to the U.S. Navy Department in August 1861 that armored ships be built for the American Navy. Ericsson still had a dislike for the U.S. Navy because of his personal experience with now Commodore Stockton, but he was nevertheless convinced by 16th President Abraham Lincoln's hard-working new Secretary of the Navy, Gideon Welles (1802-1878, served 1861-1869), and railroad executive / shipbuilder Cornelius Scranton Bushnell (1829-1896), to submit an ironclad ship design to them. Ericsson later presented drawings of USS Monitor, a novel design of armored ship which included a rotating turret housing a pair of large cannons. Despite controversy over the unique design, based on Swedish lumber rafts, the keel was eventually laid down in a New York shipyard and the experimental ironclad was launched on March 6, 1862. The ship went from plans to launch in approximately 100 days.

On March 8, the former heavy steam frigate USS Merrimack, rechristened as the CSS Virginia, for the new Confederate States Navy, was wreaking havoc on the wooden Union Navy Blockading Squadron in the lower / southern Chesapeake Bay of Virginia, sinking USS Congress and USS Cumberland and damaging / running aground the USS Minnesota off-shore of the northside peninsula from Newport News. The new Monitor appeared the next day, initiating the first battle between ironclad warships on March 9, 1862, at the Hampton Roads harbor of southeastern Virginia. The battle ended in a tactical stalemate between the two ironclad warships, neither of which appeared capable of sinking the other, only causing minor damage on its opponent, but strategically saved the remaining Federal fleet from losing any more now obsolete wooden warships and defeat. After this, numerous monitors were built for the Union's United States Navy, including additional twin turret versions, and contributed greatly to the further continued success of the blockade of Southern coasts and port cities with naval victory of the Union over the rebellious states. Despite their low draft and subsequent problems in navigating in high seas, plus frequent engine break-downs, many basic design elements of the Monitor class were copied in future warships by other designers and navies around the world. The rotating gun turret in particular is considered one of the greatest technological advances in naval history, still found on modern warships today.

In December 1863, the Royal Swedish Society of Naval Sciences elected Ericsson an Honorary Member.

== Later designs ==
Later Ericsson designed other naval vessels and weapons, including a type of torpedo and a destroyer, a torpedo boat that could fire a cannon from an underwater port. He also provided some technical support for John Philip Holland in his early submarine experiments. In the book Contributions to the Centennial Exhibition (1877, reprinted 1976) he presented his "sun engines", which collected solar heat for a hot air engine. One of these designs earned Ericsson additional income after being converted to work as a methane gas engine.

== Death and ensuing controversy ==
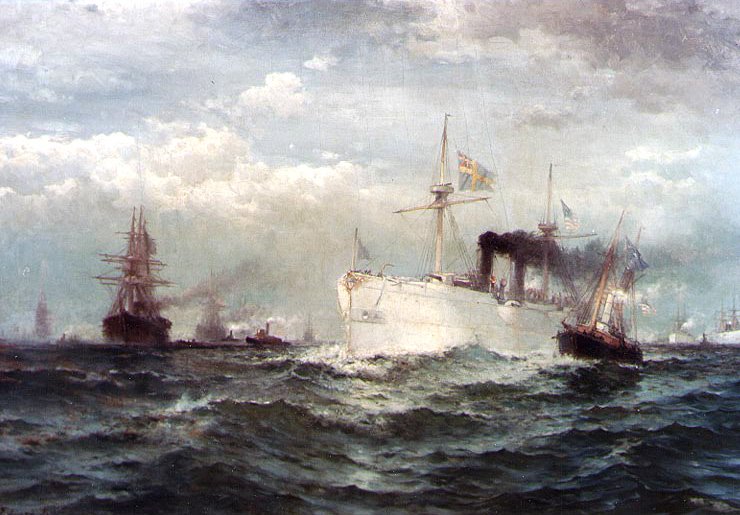
The White Squadron's Farewell Salute to the Body of John Ericsson, New York Bay, August 23, 1890

Ericsson died on March 8, 1889, the anniversary of the Battle of Hampton Roads, in which his Monitor famously played a central role. His wish to be buried in his native land sparked a series of articles in the New York Times alleging that, by selecting the third-rate USS Essex (1874) to transport his remains, the US Navy was not paying proper respect to Ericsson. The Navy responded and sent the remains on the USS Baltimore, escorted by other ships such as USS Nantucket. On August 23, 1890, the fleet departed with a twenty-one gun salute and the Swedish flag hoisted on every ship of the squadron. Around 100,000 people turned out for the funeral procession and departure ceremonies, including several veterans of the USS Monitor.

== Inventions ==
- The surface condenser
- The hot air engine
- The world's first monitor, USS Monitor, was both designed and built by Ericsson for the Union Navy in the American Civil War
- Torpedo technology, especially Destroyer, an advanced torpedo boat
- The solar machine, using concave mirrors to gather sun radiation strong enough to run an engine.
- USS Princeton (1843)
- Hoop gun construction
- the propeller

== Fellowships ==
- Foreign member of the Royal Swedish Academy of Sciences in 1850, Swedish member from 1863
- Royal Swedish Academy of War Sciences in 1852
- Honorary Doctorate at Lund University in 1868

== Monuments and memorials ==
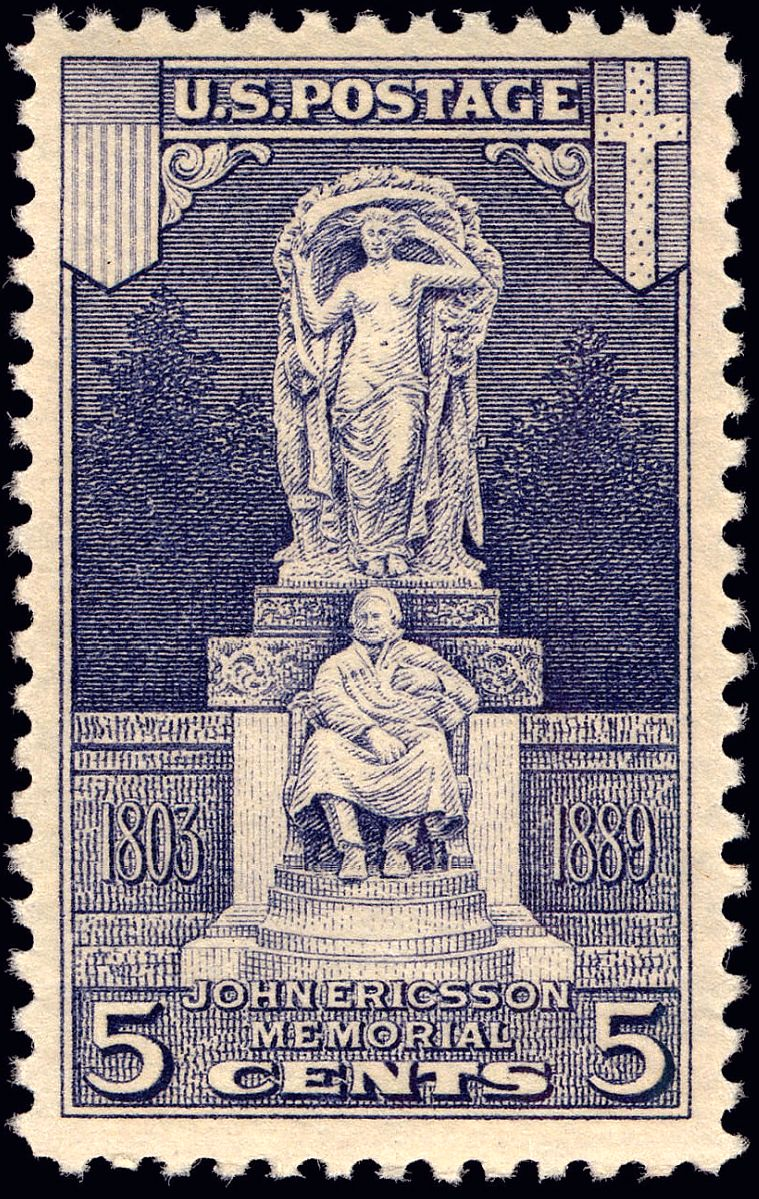
1926 US Commemorative Stamp

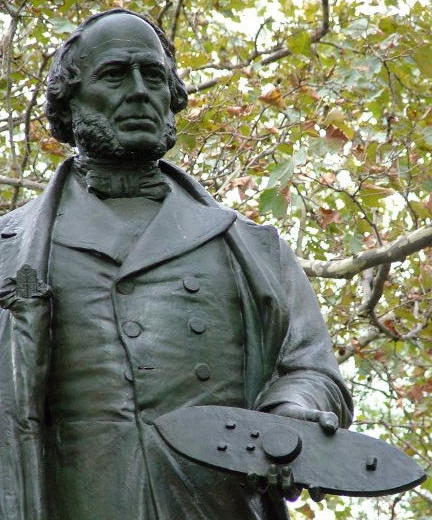
Statue in Battery Park, New York City

The stamp commemorating John Ericsson on April 20, 1926, coincided with the unveiling of the Ericsson Memorial in West Potomac Park, Washington, DC directly south of the Lincoln Memorial. The stamp pictures the memorial design by J. H. Frazer. The seated figure of Ericsson has the figures above and behind him of Vision, Labor and Adventure.

Monuments in honor of John Ericsson have been erected at:

- John Ericsson National Memorial on The Mall in Washington, D.C.
- John Ericsson Room at the American Swedish Historical Museum in Philadelphia
- John Ericsson Statue in Battery Park in New York City. Public Middle School 126 in the Greenpoint section of Brooklyn is also named for him.
- Nybroplan in Stockholm
- Kungsportsavenyn in Gothenburg
- John Ericsson Street, in Lund, Sweden
- John Ericsson fountain, Fairmount Park, Philadelphia
- Neighborhood of Ericsson, Minneapolis
- Långbanshyttan, his birthplace, in Sweden

Ships named in his honor:

- USS Ericsson

Organizations:

- The John Ericsson Republican League of Illinois is a Swedish-American partisan organization.

Mount Ericsson, a mountain summit located in the Sierra Nevada mountains of California, is named in his honor.

== In popular culture ==
Ericsson is a major character in Harry Harrison's novels of alternate history, the Stars and Stripes trilogy.

== See also ==
- Independence (steamboat), first steamboat to run on the Great Lakes, employing propellers designed by Ericsson
- American Swedish Historical Museum, John Ericsson Room
- Experiment (horse-powered boat)
- HSwMS Sölve – a Swedish monitor built 1875 and designed by Ericsson. It is currently in a Maritime Museum in Gothenburg Sweden
- Ericsson cycle, a thermodynamic cycle for heat engines named after John Ericsson.
- Ericsson Line
