= Hans-Erik Eriksson =

Swedish computer scientist and organizational theorist

Hans-Erik Eriksson (born 1961) is a Swedish computer scientist, organizational theorist, co-founder of Open Training AB, and author of "Business modeling with UML."

== Life and work ==
After his studies in computer science in the early 1980s, Eriksson started working in the field of system development and software architecture. In 1999, Eriksson and Magnus Penker founded Open Training in Sweden, an online learning and e-training institute. They sold the company in 2004, which continued as Open Training Sweden AB.

In the late 1990s and early 2000s, Eriksson authored and co-authored a series of books on business modeling and Unified Modeling Language in English. His first book in Swedish had been on object-oriented programming in C++ and was published in 1992.

== Work ==
In their 2000 "Business Modeling with UML" Eriksson and Penker proposed a fundamental domain modeling concept, which became known as the Eriksson-Penker Business Extensions. This enterprise modeling approach was similar to CIMOSA, This reference model defined four different views of a business: resources, processes, goals, and rules. The main principles in this approach, according to Grangel (2007), are:

- Process: the set of actions that transform input objects into outputs which have an added value for the customer. Processes have a goal and are affected by events.
- Events: a change of state that is caused by a process and is then received by one or more processes.
- Resources: all kinds of things that are used in the enterprise, whether they are either physical or abstract, for example, information.
- Goals: defined for the enterprise and each of its processes; they represent the desired state of each enterprise resource.
- Business rules: define the conditions under which business activity is to be performed and enterprise knowledge should be represented.
- General mechanism: mechanisms to be used in any diagram

The Eriksson-Penker Business Extensions for the UML can be applied for "the analysis and description of enterprise-wide data structures and conversions between them (OMG Common Data Warehouse Metamodel - OMG CWM), and for modeling business workflows (Workflow Management Coalition Metamodel)."

== Selected publications ==
- Eriksson, Hans-Erik, and Magnus Penker. UML toolkit. John Wiley & Sons, Inc., 1997.
- Eriksson, Hans-Erik, and Magnus Penker. Business modeling with UML: Business Patterns at Work, John Wiley & Sons, New York, USA (2000).
- Eriksson, Hans-Erik, et al. UML 2 toolkit. Vol. 26. John Wiley & Sons, 2003.
