= Jonas Eriksson =

Jonas Eriksson may refer to:

- Jonas Eriksson (biathlete) (born 1970), Swedish Olympic biathlon competitor
- Jonas Eriksson (referee) (born 1974), Swedish football referee
- Jonas Eriksson (politician) (born 1967), Swedish politician
