= Hege R. Eriksen =

Scholar

Hege Randi Eriksen (born 18 April 1965) is the Research Director of Uni Health and Professor at the University of Bergen, Norway.

Eriksen holds a Candidate Scientist in Sport and Physical exercise from the Department of Biology and Medicine, Norwegian University of Sport and Physical Education and a Master of Science in Epidemiology from Erasmus University, Rotterdam.

In 1998 she earned a PhD at the Faculty of Psychology, University of Bergen, with the thesis "Stress and coping: Does it really matter for subjective health complaints?"

Eriksen published in international academic journals on stress and coping, subjective health complaints, sick leave and rehabilitation. Together with colleague Holger Ursin she developed the Cognitive Activation Theory of Stress (CATS)

Hege R. Eriksen is the past president of the International Society of Behavioral Medicine.
