= Ronald Derrickson =

Indigenous leader

Ronald M. Derrickson
- Born: October 6, 1941 (age 84); Westbank Indian Reserve, British Columbia, Canada
- Occupations: Indigenous leader, Businessman, Author

Ronald M. Derrickson is an Indigenous leader from the Interior of British Columbia, Canada who was six times elected chief of the Westbank Indian Band and was made a Grand Chief by the Union of BC Indian Chiefs in 2012. He is also one of the most successful Indigenous businessmen in Canada and won an Aboriginal Achievement Award for Business and Commerce. He co-authored two award-winning books with the late Arthur Manuel: Unsettling Canada: A National Wake-up Call and Reconciliation Manifesto. His memoire, Fight or Submit: Standing Tall in Two Worlds, was published in the fall of 2020. He is the father of singer/song writer Kelly Derrickson.

== Early life ==
Derrickson was born on the Westbank Indian Reserve in the British Columbia interior to Ted Derrickson and Margaret (née Schoven) on October 6, 1941. As a young man, he worked as a fruit picker and a welder and rancher before he was elected Westbank band chief in 1976.

== West Bank Band Chief ==
Over the next ten years, he led his band through a period of rapid economic development, taking it from one of the poorest in British Columbia to one of the wealthiest. He returned to band leadership in 1998 and broke new ground by leading his people on a logging venture on their Aboriginal title lands with an Indigenous rather than a provincial permit, an action that led to similar logging initiatives among B.C. Indigenous peoples.

In 1986, the federal government launched an enquiry into Derrickson's tenure as chief in the form of the Hall Commission. The enquiry cleared him of any wrong-doing.

== Grand Chief and Author ==
Derrickson was made a Grand Chief by the Union of British Columbia Indian Chiefs in 2012 in recognition of his lifetime of political and economic leadership. His books that he co-authored with Arthur Manuel, Unsettling Canada: A National Wake-up Call (Between the Lines, Toronto, 2015) won the Aboriginal Prize of the Canadian History Association in 2016 and Reconciliation Manifesto (James Lorimer and Company, Toronto, 2017) won the B.C. Book Prize for Non-fiction in 2018. His most recent book, Fight or Submit: Standing Tall in Two Worlds, is a finalist for the Indies Award in the Autobiography and Memoir category.
