= Sheldon Erikson =

American businessman (born 1941)

Sheldon Erikson (born September 23, 1941) is an American businessman. He is the Supervisory Director for Frank's International, NV, a Dutch based oilfield services firm with operational headquarters in Houston.

He is Chairman of the Board (since May 2, 1996) and was President and Chief Executive Officer from January 1995 to April 2008 of Cameron. He is a member of the Board of Directors of the National Petroleum Council and American Petroleum Institute.

He was Chairman of the Board (from 1988 to April 1995) and President and Chief Executive Officer (from 1987 to April 1995) of the Western Company of North America Prior to that, he was President of Joy Petroleum Equipment Group of Joy Manufacturing Company. Before joining Joy, he served as President of the Oilfield Services Group of NL Industries, Inc., as well as Executive Vice President and Chief Operating Officer of Digicon, Inc., Group Vice President of the Plastic and Chemicals Group of Hoover Universal Corporation and General Manager of the Mining Products Department of General Electric Company.

== Education ==
He studied engineering and economics at the University of Illinois and has an M.B.A. from the Harvard Graduate School of Business Administration.

== Resources ==
- "Directors and Officers". CooperCameron.com. Archived from the original on January 10, 2006.
