= Erickson Corner, Connecticut =

- Unincorporated village
- Location within Connecticut Location within the United States
- Coordinates: 41°39′49″N 73°25′19″W
- Country: United States
- State: Connecticut
- County: Litchfield
- Town: New Milford
- Elevation: 617 ft (188 m)
- Time zone: UTC-5 (Eastern (EST))
  - Summer (DST): UTC-4 (EDT)
- Area code: 860
- GNIS feature ID: 212455

Erickson Corner (also Erickson Corners) is an unincorporated community in the town of New Milford, Litchfield County, Connecticut, United States.
