= Edward Charles Ericson =

American politician

Member of the South Dakota Senate from the 1st district
- In office 1889–1890
- Preceded by: none
- Succeeded by: Truman M. Stewart

Personal details
- Born: August 24, 1856 Finspong, Östergötland, Sweden
- Died: February 8, 1910 (aged 53) Flandreau, South Dakota
- Party: Republican
- Spouse: Sylvia Ann Hayes
- Relations: E. W. Ericson (brother)
- Children: three
- Profession: lawyer

Edward Charles Ericson (August 24, 1856 – February 8, 1910) was an American politician. He served in the South Dakota State Senate from 1889 to 1890. He also sat in the Dakota Territory Legislature from 1887 to 1889.
