= Ericsson Stadium =

Ericsson Stadium is the former name of:

- Bank of America Stadium, Charlotte, North Carolina, US.
- Mount Smart Stadium, Auckland, New Zealand.
