= John Ericsson Memorial =

Sculpture by James Earle Fraser in Washington, D.C., U.S.

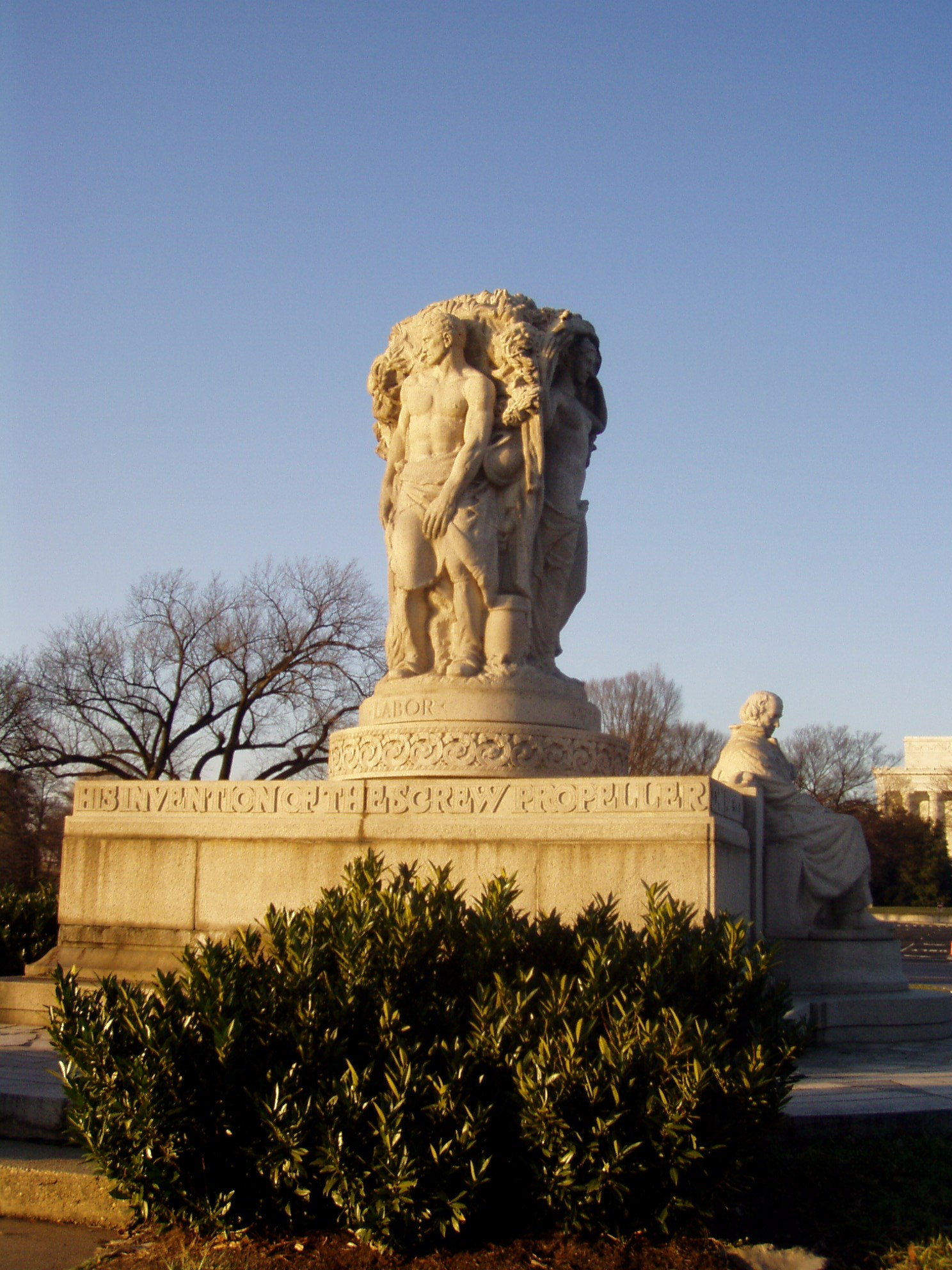
- Interactive map of John Ericsson Memorial
- 38°53′12.1″N 77°3′0.7″W
- Location: Washington, D.C., United States

History
- Established: August 31, 1916

Site notes
- Governing body: National Park Service

John Ericsson Memorial, located near the National Mall at Ohio Drive and Independence Avenue, SW, in Washington, D.C., is dedicated to the man who revolutionized naval history with his invention of the screw propeller. The Swedish engineer John Ericsson was also the designer of USS Monitor, the ship that ensured Union naval supremacy during the American Civil War.

The memorial was authorized by Congress August 31, 1916, and dedicated May 29, 1926 by President Calvin Coolidge and Crown Prince Gustaf Adolf of Sweden. Congress appropriated $35,000 for the creation of the memorial, and Americans chiefly of Scandinavian descent raised an additional $25,000. Constructed on a site near the Lincoln Memorial between September 1926 and April 1927, the pink Milford granite memorial is 20 feet (6.1 m) high with a 9-foot-diameter (2.7 m) base.

Sculpted by James Earle Fraser, it features a seated figure of Ericsson 6 feet 5 inches (1.96 m) high, and three standing figures representing adventure, labor, and vision. The national memorial is managed by National Mall and Memorial Parks.

== Images ==
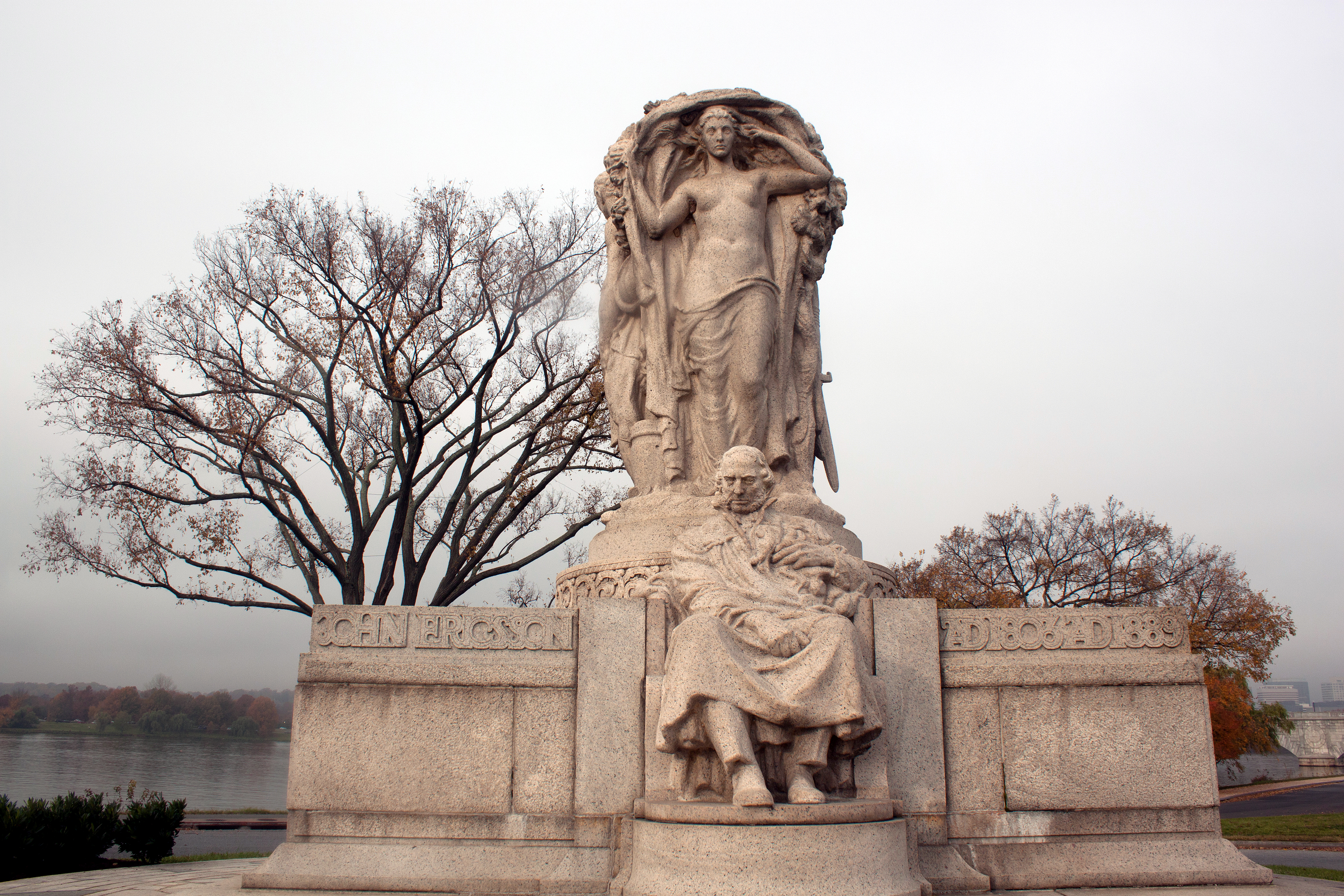

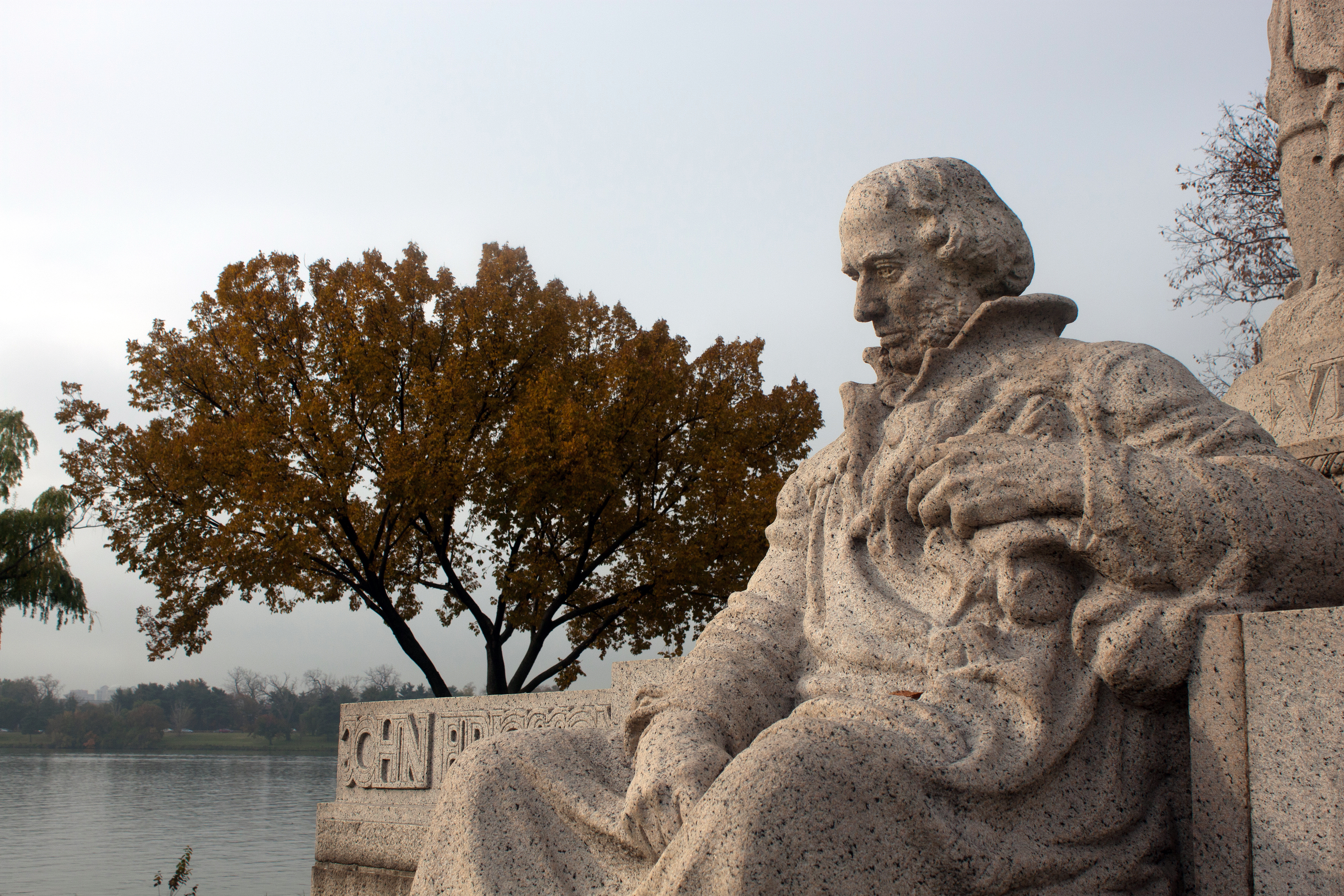

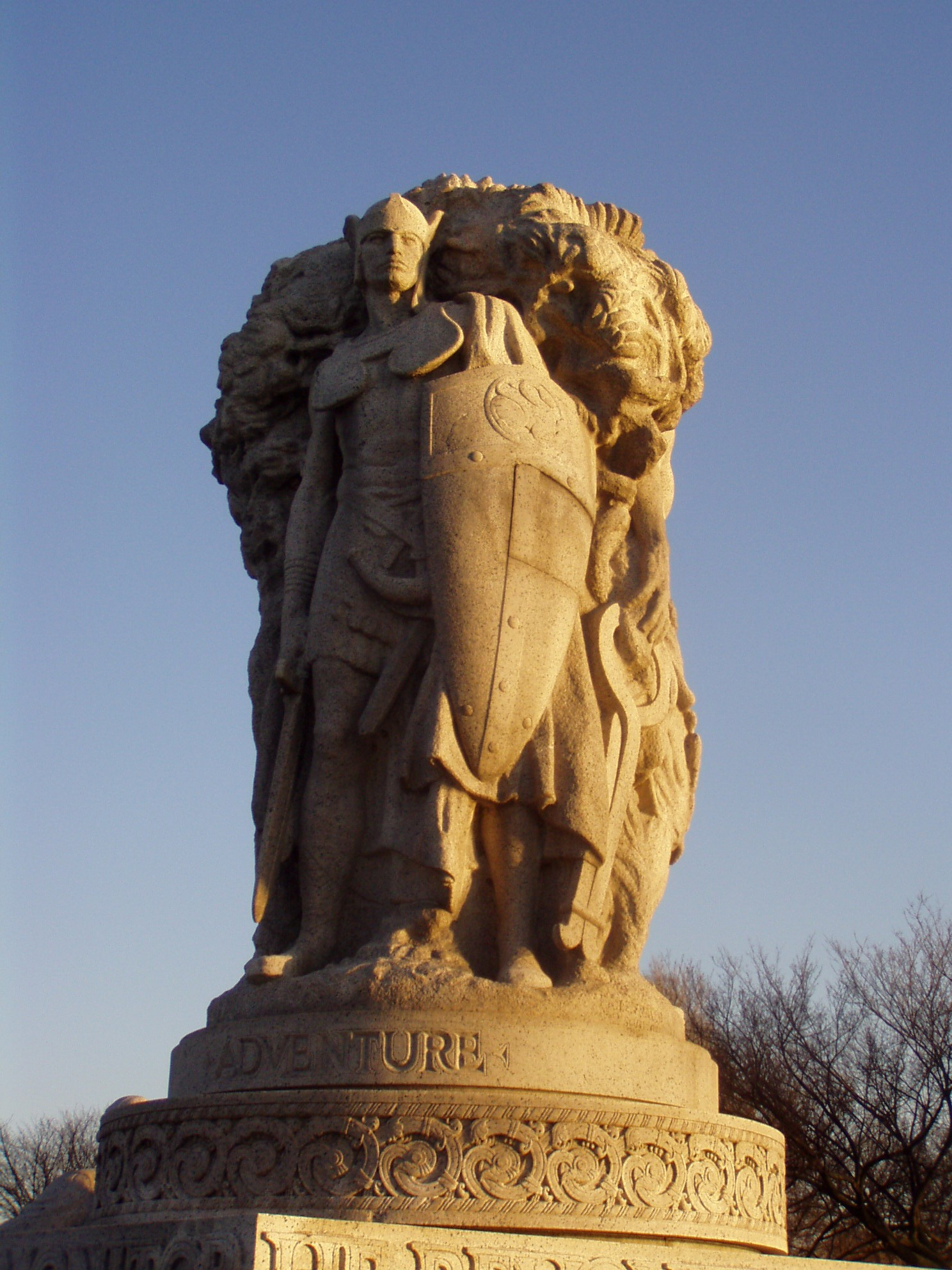
Adventure section of memorial.

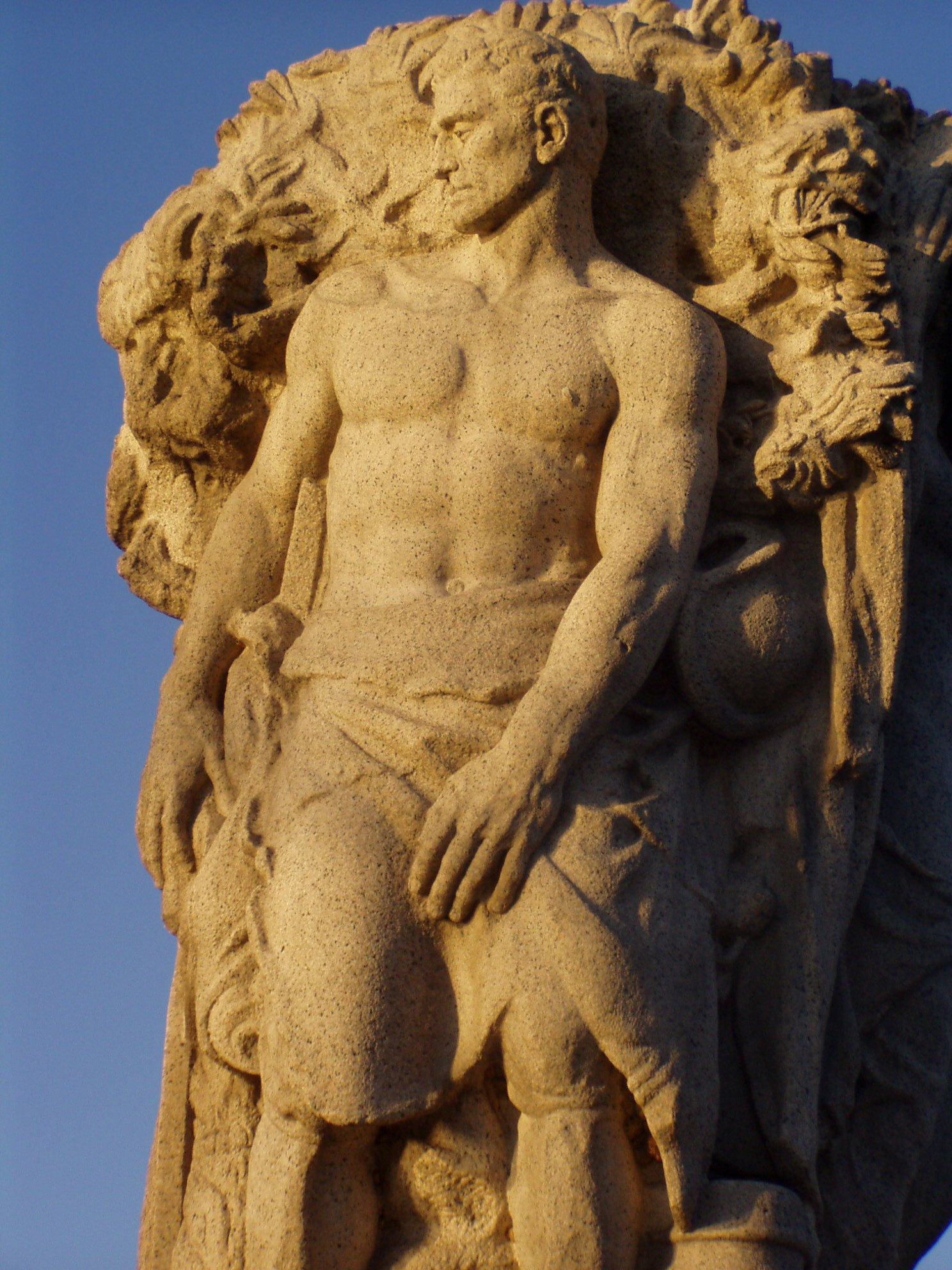
Closeup of Labor section.

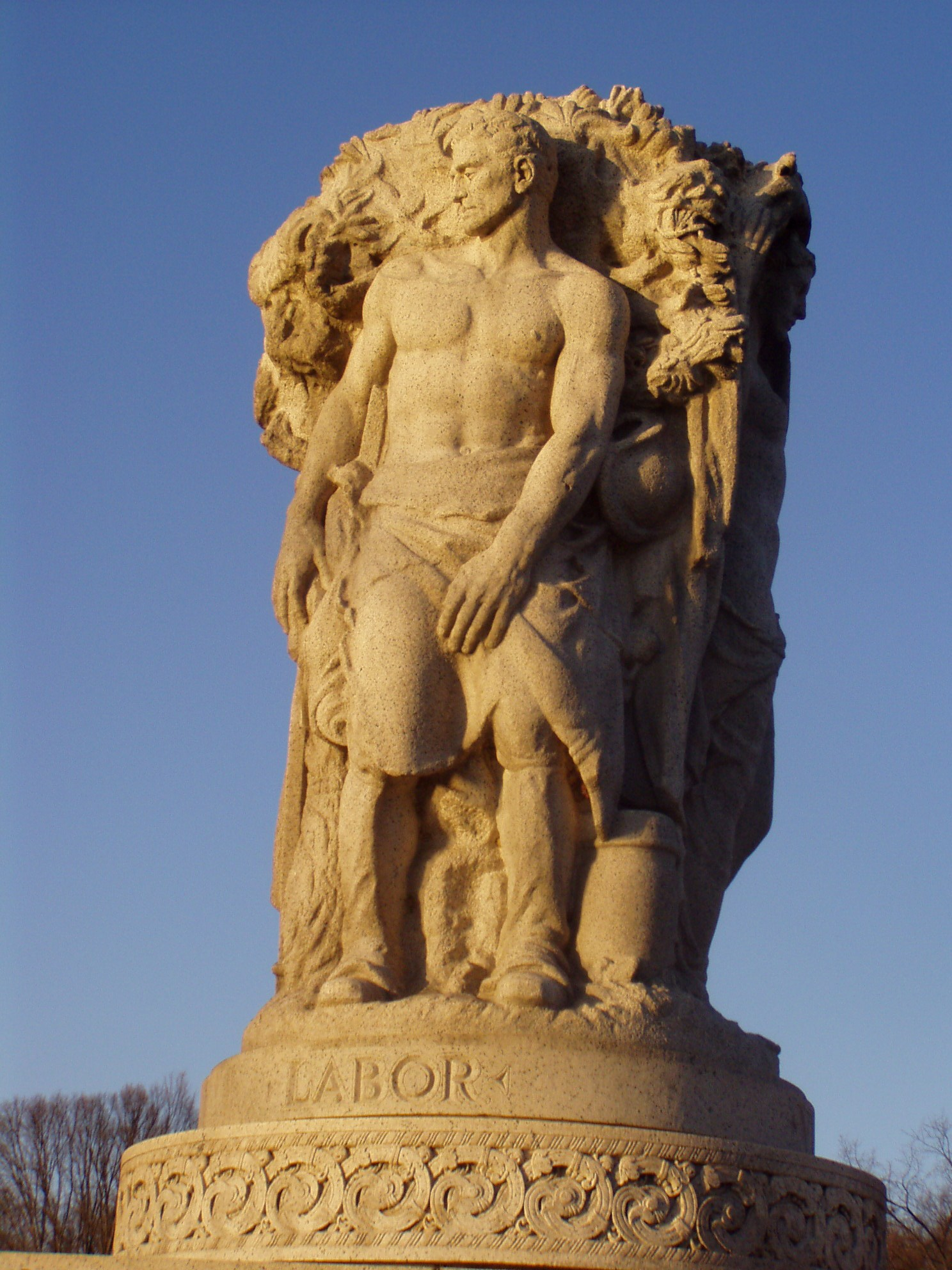
Labor section.

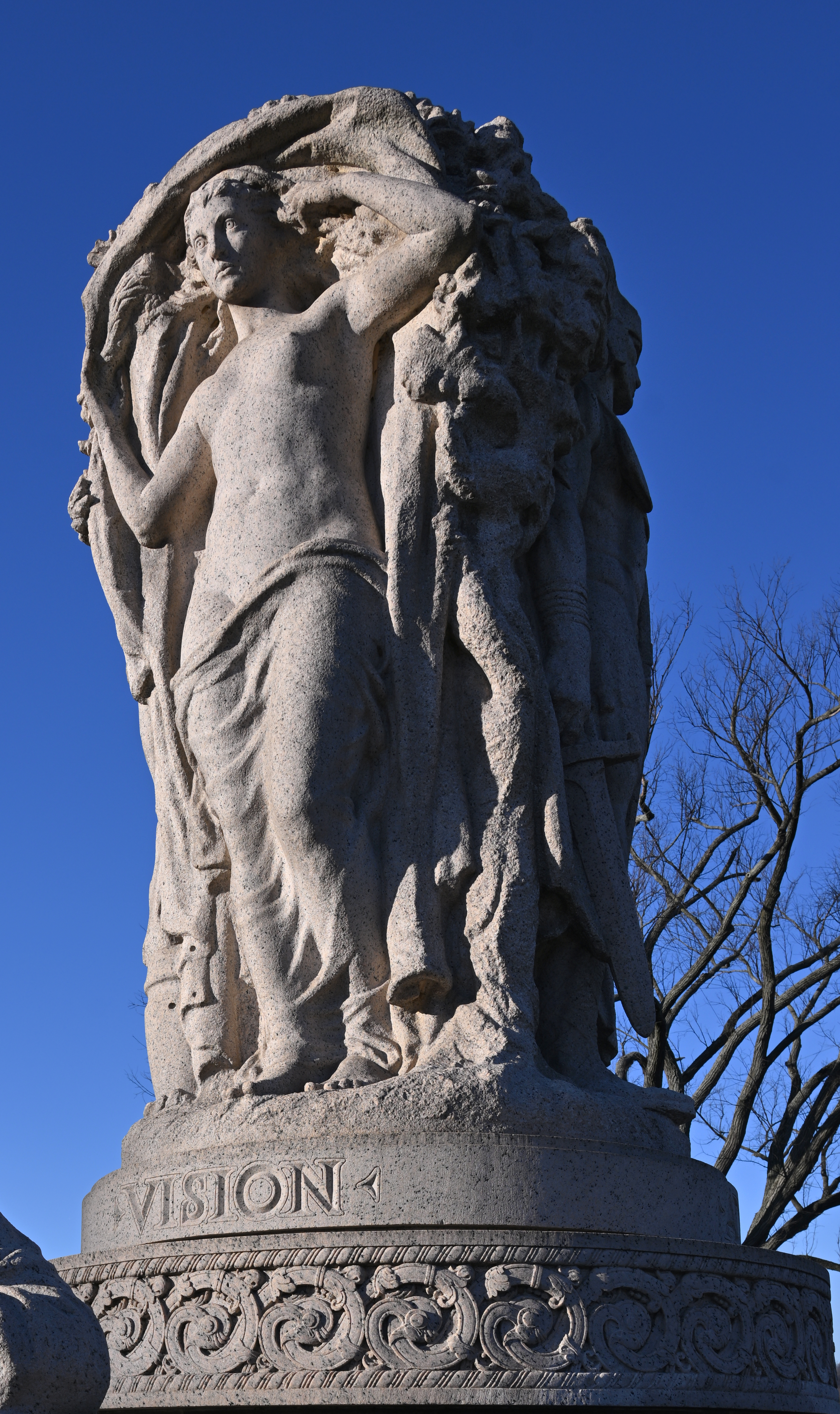
Vision section of memorial.

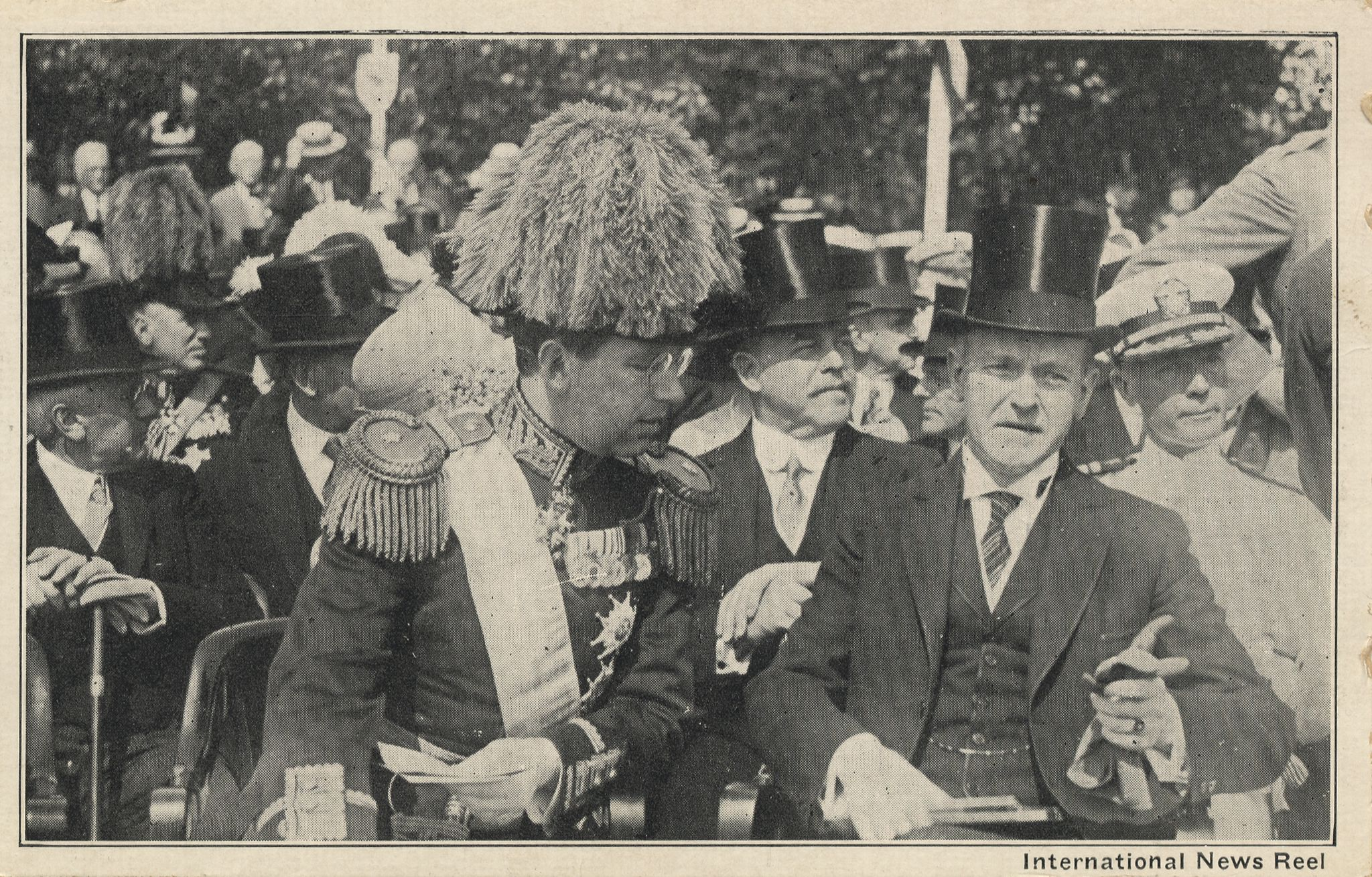
The Crown Prince of Sweden and the President of the United States at the dedication ceremony

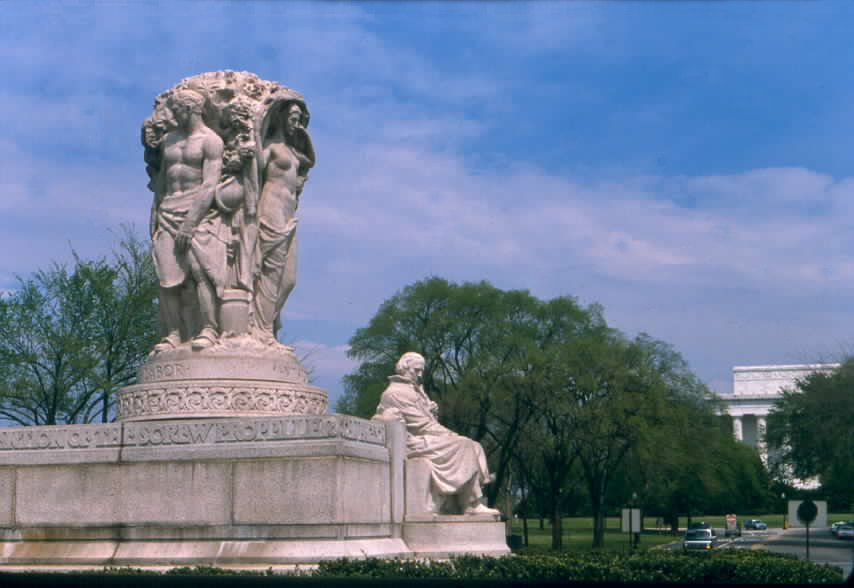

== See also ==
- List of public art in Washington, D.C., Ward 2
