= Derrickson =

Derrickson is a surname. Notable people with the surname include:

- Kelly Derrickson, Canadian singer-songwriter
- Marcus Derrickson (born 1996), American basketball player
- Ronald Derrickson, Canadian indigenous leader
- Scott Derrickson (born 1966), American director, screenwriter, and producer
