= National Centre for Emergency Primary Health Care =

Health center in Bergen, Norway

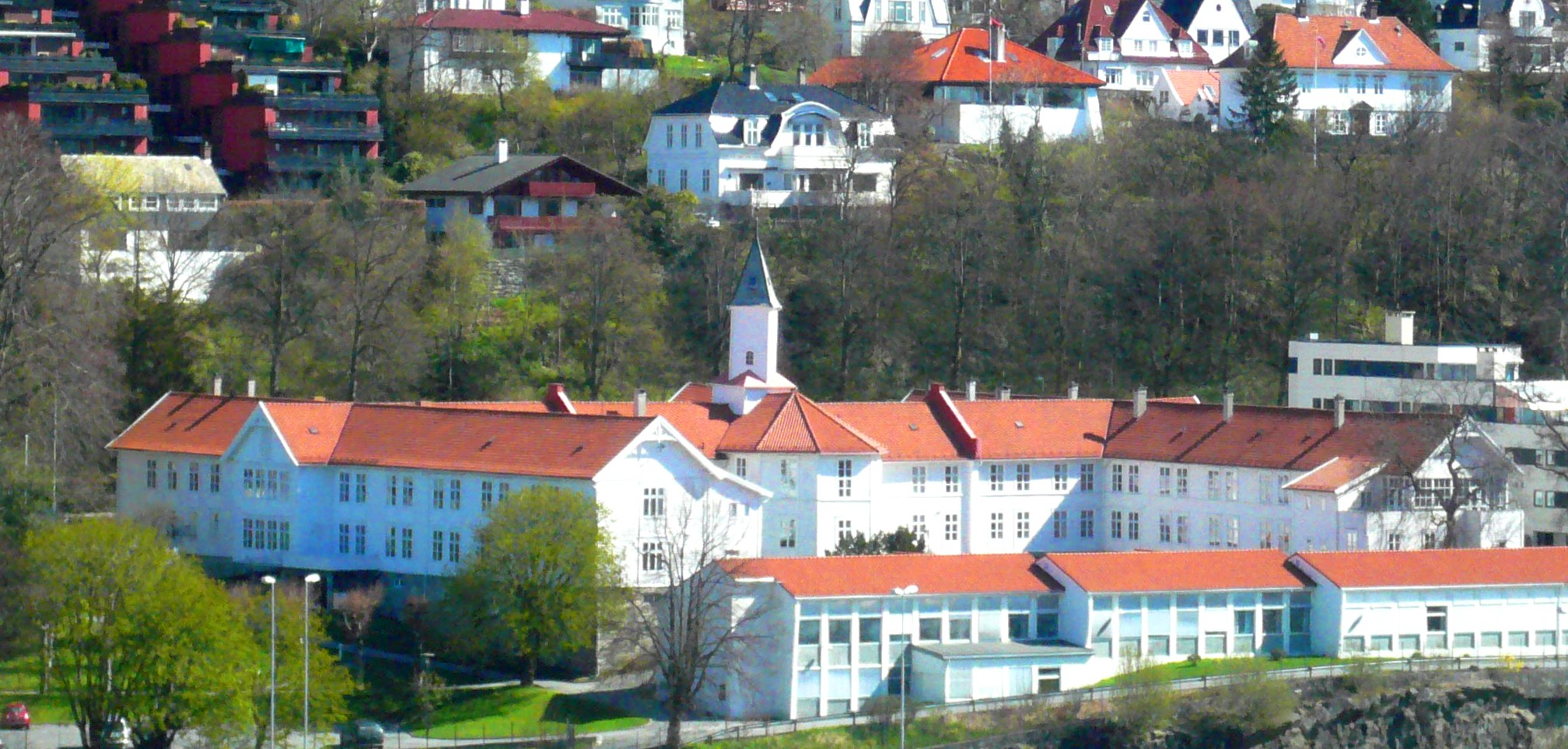
National Centre for Emergency Primary Health Care is located in Bergen, Norway.

National Centre for Emergency Primary Health Care (Nasjonalt kompetansesenter for legevaktmedisin, NKLM) is a Norwegian institution established by the Ministry of Health and Care Services in 2004. It is a research, advisory and monitoring body for the Norwegian emergency primary health care (out-of-hours) services (legevakt) and assault centres.

National Centre for Emergency Primary Health Care is funded by the Norwegian Directorate for Health and is academically linked to the University of Bergen. It is a part of NORCE Research and is headed by Jesper Blinkenberg.

The centre contributes to national and international professional development in the field by establishing required national professional standards and by contributing to and participating in research. It has established several registers that monitor the activity of the out-of-hours services in Norway. The centre provides advice and professional support to central and local administrators and participates in graduate and postgraduate education.

National Centre for Emergency Primary Health Care center is responsible for two clinical decision support tools; a telephone counseling software for nurses ("Telefonråd") and a web- and smartphone-based handbook of emergency primary health care ("Legevakthåndboken").

The research is mainly concerned with emergency primary health care epidemiology, emergency mental health care, triage, assault centre research, health care delivery, patient safety and health personnel safety.
