= Lars Eriksson =

Lars Eriksson may refer to:

== The arts ==
- Lars Eriksson (musician) (born 1980), Swedish singer and songwriter
- Lasse Eriksson (1949–2011; Lars Gunnar Eriksson), Swedish comedian, actor, and writer

== Politics ==
- Lars Eriksson (politician) (born 1970), Swedish politician
- Lars-Gunnar Eriksson, Swedish student politician, who unwittingly employed South African police informant Craig Williamson in 1977, while head of the International University Exchange Fund

== Sport ==
- Lars Eriksson (footballer, born 1926), Swedish football midfielder
- Lars Eriksson (footballer, born 1965), Swedish football goalkeeper
- Lars Eriksson (ice hockey) (born 1961), Swedish ice hockey goaltender

== See also ==
- Lars Eriksen (born 1954), Norwegian cross country skier
- Lars Erickssong, fictional character in Eurovision
