= Caloric ship Ericsson =

Coordinates: 48.830379°N 125.243956°W

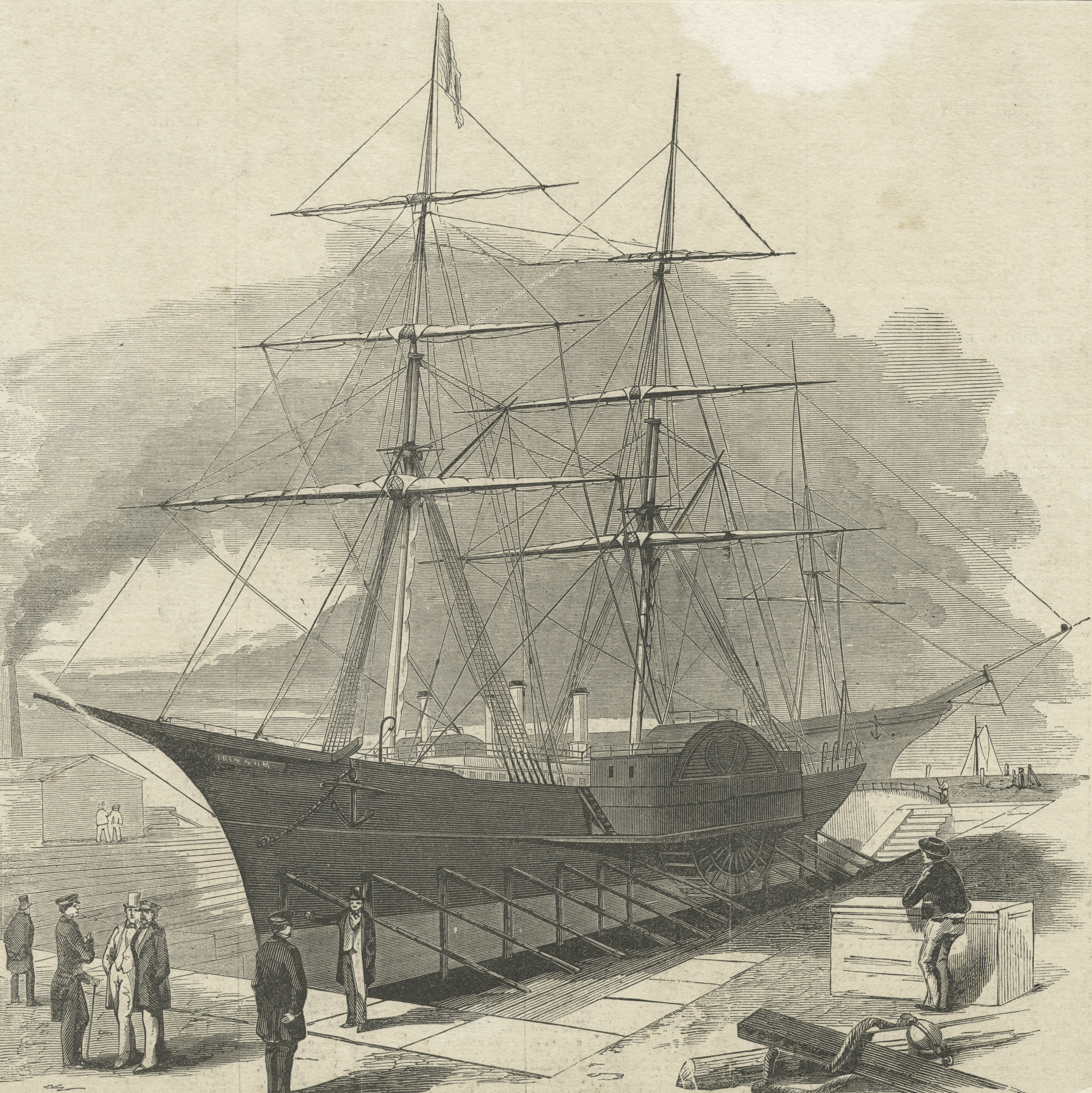

History

United States
- Name: Ericsson
- Builder: Perine, Patterson, and Stack
- Launched: 15 September 1852
- Fate: Wrecked near Barkley Sound, British Columbia, Canada; 22 November 1892

General characteristics
- Type: Paddle steamer
- Tonnage: 2,200 tons
- Length: 250 ft (76 m)
- Beam: 40 ft (12 m)
- Propulsion: 4 × Caloric cylinders; (later converted to steam)

Ericsson was a wooden side-wheel paddle steamer completed in 1852 and launched in New York City. Designed by the Swedish-American inventor John Ericsson, the vessel was notable for its propulsion system, which utilized a caloric engine (hot air engine) rather than a standard steam engine. The ship was intended to demonstrate the superiority of heated air over steam as a motive power, specifically regarding fuel efficiency and safety. Although the vessel successfully navigated under its own power, the engines proved too heavy and underpowered for commercial viability, leading to the ship's eventual conversion to steam power.

== Design and engineering ==
The construction of the Ericsson was driven by John Ericsson's desire to eliminate the dangers associated with high-pressure steam boilers, which frequently exploded during the mid-19th century. The ship's propulsion system consisted of four massive working cylinders, each 14 feet (4.3 m) in diameter, paired with four supply cylinders of 11.5 feet (3.5 m) in diameter. The pistons had a stroke of 6 feet (1.8 m). The engine operated on the principle of expanding air via heat; air was compressed into a reservoir, heated to increase pressure, and then admitted to the working cylinders to drive the pistons. A key feature of the design was the "regenerator" (a wire mesh heat exchanger), which attempted to capture heat from the escaping air to warm the incoming air, theoretically maximizing fuel efficiency.

== Launch and construction ==
The hull was built by the shipyard of Perine, Patterson, and Stack in Williamsburg, New York. The vessel measured approximately 250 feet (76 m) in length with a beam of 40 feet (12 m) and a depth of hold of 27 feet (8.2 m). The total cost of the ship was reported to be approximately $500,000, financed by a group of investors led by John B. Kitching who formed the New York and Havre Company. The ship was launched on September 15, 1852, in a public ceremony witnessed by approximately 10,000 spectators.

== Sea trials and performance ==
On January 11, 1853, the Ericsson undertook a trial trip from New York Harbor to Sandy Hook with members of the press and the New York City Council aboard. During this trial, the engines produced enough power to propel the ship at a speed of approximately 8 to 9 mph (7.0 to 7.8 kn). While the mechanism operated smoothly and the consumption of anthracite coal was significantly lower than that of comparable steamships—reported at roughly 6 tons per 24 hours compared to 50 or 60 tons for steam—the speed was insufficient for the vessel's intended role as a transatlantic packet ship. Engineers noted that the massive size of the cylinders limited the engine's speed to roughly 9 revolutions per minute. The ship ran flawlessly for 73 hours.

== Sinking and conversion ==
Despite the successful demonstration of the mechanical principle, the caloric engines were commercially impractical due to their immense weight and bulk relative to the power generated. In April 1854, while returning from a trip to Washington, D.C., the Ericsson encountered a squall near Jersey City. A coal port had been left open to facilitate waste removal, and the vessel took on water and sank in shallow water. The ship was subsequently raised, but the heavy caloric engines were removed to reduce the vessel's draft. They were replaced with inclined steam engines, and the Ericsson operated as a conventional steamer until it was wrecked in November 1892, when blown aground at the entrance to Barkley Sound, British Columbia, Canada.
