= E. W. Ericson =

American politician

Member of the South Dakota Senate from the 1st district
- In office 1915–1922
- Preceded by: John Morrissey
- Succeeded by: John B. Johnson

Personal details
- Born: August 24, 1856 Finspong, Östergötland, Sweden
- Died: November 11, 1951 (aged 93) Hawarden, Iowa, U.S.
- Party: Republican
- Spouse: Mary Ruth Peterson
- Children: five

Eric William Ericson (March 16, 1858 – November 11, 1951) was an American politician. He served in the South Dakota State Senate from 1915 to 1922. He was a brother of Edward Charles Ericson.
