= LeRoy Erickson =

American politician (1926–1997)

Member of the North Dakota House of Representatives from the 26th district
- In office 1967–1968
- In office 1973–1980

Member of the North Dakota Senate
- In office 1981–1984

Personal details
- Born: May 15, 1926 DeLamere, North Dakota
- Died: January 14, 1997 (aged 70) DeLamere, North Dakota
- Party: Republican
- Profession: farmer

Kenneth LeRoy Erickson (May 15, 1926 – January 14, 1997) was an American farmer and politician who was a member of the North Dakota House of Representatives and North Dakota Senate. He was a delegate to the 1971-1972 North Dakota Constitutional Convention.

Erickson was born near De Lamere, North Dakota. He was the son of Edward Selmer Erickson (1894-1965) and Agnes Martinson Erickson (1896-1967). In 1944, his parents retired and he began farming his family farm in rural Sargent County. He also served on the Council of Immanuel Lutheran Church in DeLamere and as a Township Supervisor for Hall Township in Sargent County.

He represented District 26 in the North Dakota House from 1967 to 1968 and 1973-1980 and in the Senate from 1981 to 1984.
