= Felix Eriksson (ice hockey) =

Swedish ice hockey player

- Born: April 11, 1998 (age 27) Gävle, Sweden
- Height: 5 ft 10 in (178 cm)
- Weight: 163 lb (74 kg; 11 st 9 lb)
- Position: Centre
- Shot: Right
- Played for: Brynäs IF; Valbo HC; Hudiksvalls HC; Lindlövens IF; Strömsbro IF
- Playing career: 2011–2018

Felix Eriksson (born January 8, 1992) is a Swedish professional ice hockey player. He played with Brynäs IF in the Elitserien during the 2010–11 Elitserien season.

== Career statistics ==
			Regular season					Playoffs
Season	Team	League	GP	G	A	Pts	PIM	GP	G	A	Pts	PIM
2007–08	Brynäs IF U16	U16 SM	8	8	9	17	2	—	—	—	—	—
2007–08	Brynäs IF J18	J18 Elit	—	—	—	—	—	—	—	—	—	—
2007–08	Brynäs IF J18	J18 Allsvenskan	7	0	1	1	2	—	—	—	—	—
2008–09	Brynäs IF J18	J18 Elit	17	5	7	12	8	—	—	—	—	—
2008–09	Brynäs IF J18	J18 Allsvenskan	14	6	4	10	6	3	1	1	2	0
2008–09	Brynäs IF J20	J20 SuperElit	3	1	0	1	0	—	—	—	—	—
2009–10	Brynäs IF J18	J18 Elit	4	3	3	6	0	—	—	—	—	—
2009–10	Brynäs IF J18	J18 Allsvenskan	5	1	6	7	0	4	2	2	4	2
2009–10	Brynäs IF J20	J20 SuperElit	37	4	8	12	12	5	2	1	3	4
2010–11	Brynäs IF J20	J20 SuperElit	36	4	15	19	28	2	0	0	0	2
2010–11	Brynäs IF	Elitserien	1	0	0	0	0	—	—	—	—	—
2011–12	Brynäs IF J20	J20 SuperElit	43	7	13	20	6	2	0	0	0	0
2012–13	Valbo HC	Hockeyettan	33	6	20	26	30	6	2	1	3	8
2012–13	Hudiksvalls HC	Hockeyettan	7	0	1	1	2	—	—	—	—	—
2013–14	Lindlövens IF	Hockeyettan	36	4	9	13	14	—	—	—	—	—
2014–15	Valbo HC	Division 2	14	7	11	18	6	—	—	—	—	—
2015–16	Valbo HC	Division 2	16	4	11	15	0	10	3	5	8	35
2016–17	Strömsbro IF	Division 3	20	22	41	63	2	1	0	0	0	0
2017–18	Strömsbro IF	Division 2	2	0	1	1	0	—	—	—	—	—
Elitserien totals			1	0	0	0	0	—	—	—	—	—
Hockeyettan totals			76	10	30	40	46	6	2	1	3	8
Division 2 totals			32	11	23	34	6	10	3	5	8	35
