= Fredrik Eriksson (ice hockey, born 1980) =

Swedish professional ice hockey player

- Born: January 30, 1980 (age 45); Kristinehamn, SWE
- Height: 5 ft 11 in (180 cm)
- Weight: 198 lb (90 kg; 14 st 2 lb)
- Position: Goaltender
- Shoots: left
- Allsvenskan team: Bofors IK
- Playing career: 1999–present

Fredrik Eriksson (born January 30, 1980, in Kristinehamn) is a Swedish professional ice hockey player. He is currently playing for HC Vita Hästen. He has played for Bofors IK in the Allsvenskan, the second highest league in Sweden. He joined Bofors in May 2007, when he left Västerås IK, but he has also played with Bofors IK between 1999 and 2003 and the 2004/05 season. During his time at Bofors he played short stints with Färjestads BK, except the 2003/04 which he was with Färjestas the whole season.
