= Anders Eriksson (ice hockey, born 1985) =

Swedish professional ice hockey forward

- Born: March 17, 1985 (age 41) Floda, Sweden
- Height: 6 ft 1 in (185 cm)
- Weight: 196 lb (89 kg; 14 st 0 lb)
- Position: Centre
- Shoots: Right
- team Former teams: Free Agent; Växjö Lakers; Örebro HK; Lausitzer Füchse
- Playing career: 2005–present

Dan Anders Eriksson (born March 17, 1985) is a Swedish professional ice hockey forward. He is currently an unrestricted free agent having last played with Lausitzer Füchse in the DEL2 in Germany.

== Playing career ==
Eriksson was born in Floda, Sweden, but grew up in Gothenburg with Frölunda HC as his youth team. As a 19-year-old, he signed with Borås HC of the Swedish Division 1, the third tier in Swedish senior ice hockey, for his first professional contract with a senior team. With 21 goals and 41 points in 42 games with the team in the 2006–07 season, Eriksson was a significant factor for Borås HC reaching the 2007 HockeyAllsvenskan Kvalserien that season. In the 2007 Kvalserien he scored 5 goals and 8 points in 8 games; Borås finished second in the 2007 Kvalserien and promoted to the HockeyAllsvenskan, the second-tier league, for the 2007–08 season. Anders Eriksson continued to play for the team for three seasons and was a good reason why Borås managed to stay in the HockeyAllsvenskan. His last season with the team ended with 14 goals and 28 points in 51 games.

Växjö Lakers in the same league, intending to reach the Kvalserien qualification for the top-tier league Elitserien (SEL) for the third consecutive year, signed Anders Eriksson prior to the 2010–11 season. In the regular season, he scored 12 goals and 33 points for the team, which won the HockeyAllsvenskan for the first time in the club's history and successfully moved on to play in the 2011 Kvalserien. Eriksson's major breakthrough came there. A significant contributor to the Lakers' promotion to the Elitserien, he finished fourth in the scoring league, with 7 goals and 11 points in 10 games. Four of his goals were game-winning ones (GWG's), winning the GWG league.

Anders Eriksson played his first Elitserien game on September 13, 2011, against Frölunda HC. He did not manage to score any points as Frölunda shutout the Lakers 2–0.

After four seasons with Örebro HK and establishing himself in the SHL, Eriksson left the club as a free agent to try-out with Färjestad BK for the 2016–17 season. On September 11, 2016, he was released from his try-out with FBK and returned to train with Örebro HK. On September 26, 2016, was re-signed to a temporary seven week contract to cover for initial injuries on the Örebro HK roster.

== Career statistics ==
			Regular season					Playoffs
Season	Team	League	GP	G	A	Pts	PIM	GP	G	A	Pts	PIM
2000–01	Frölunda HC	J20	1	0	0	0	0	—	—	—	—	—
2003–04	Frölunda HC	J20	36	10	18	28	18	5	1	0	1	4
2004–05	Frölunda HC	J20	32	11	14	25	28	6	2	0	2	2
2005–06	Borås HC	Div. 1	44	12	17	29	61	—	—	—	—	—
2006–07	Borås HC	Div. 1	42	21	20	41	58	8	5	3	8	18
2007–08	Borås HC	Allsv	45	11	21	32	30	4	1	2	3	2
2008–09	Borås HC	Allsv	35	3	8	11	26	—	—	—	—	—
2009–10	Borås HC	Allsv	51	14	14	28	65	—	—	—	—	—
2010–11	Växjö Lakers	Allsv	51	12	21	33	28	10	7	4	11	18
2011–12	Växjö Lakers	SEL	47	3	5	8	14	—	—	—	—	—
2012–13	Örebro HK	Allsv	43	8	11	19	12	16	5	5	10	10
2013–14	Örebro HK	SHL	55	3	7	10	36	—	—	—	—	—
2014–15	Örebro HK	SHL	55	12	6	18	53	6	0	0	0	0
2015–16	Örebro HK	SHL	49	5	6	11	28	2	0	0	0	0
2016–17	Örebro HK	SHL	12	1	0	1	0	—	—	—	—	—
2016–17	AIK IF	Allsv	36	4	8	12	35	8	0	2	2	4
2017–18	Lausitzer Füchse	DEL2	42	17	27	44	32	—	—	—	—	—
2018–19	Lausitzer Füchse	DEL2	49	15	27	42	44	7	3	4	7	6
SHL totals			218	24	24	48	131	8	0	0	0	0
