= Erikson =

- Pronunciation: ER-ik-son

Origin
- Origin: Old Norse
- Meaning: "son of Erik"

Other names
- Variant forms: Eriksen, Eriksson

Erikson is a common Scandinavian patronymic surname meaning "son of Erik", itself an Old Norse given name. There are other spelling variations of this surname, as it is common amongst Danes, Swedes, Norwegians, and Finns. Erikson is uncommon as a given name. People with the surname include:

- Duke Erikson (born 1953), American musician with the band Garbage
- Erik Erikson (1902–1994), Jewish German (but a Danish citizen) developmental psychologist and psychoanalyst
- Gustaf Erikson (1872–1947), Finnish ship owner
- Hanna Erikson (born 1990), Swedish cross-country skier
- Joan Erikson (1903–1997), Canadian psychologist
- Johan Erikson (born 1985), Swedish ski jumper
- Jon Erikson (1954–2014), American long distance swimmer
- Kai T. Erikson (1931–2025), American sociologist
- Leif Erikson (c. 970 – c. 1020), Norse explorer, son of Erik the Red, and first European to reach the Americas
- Neil Erikson (born 1985), Australian extreme neo-Nazi activist
- Raymond L. Erikson (1936–2020), American molecular biologist and virologist
- Sheldon Erikson (born 1941), American, Chairman of the Board, President, CEO of Cameron
- Steven Erikson (born 1959), pseudonym of Steve Rune Lundin, Canadian novelist
- Thorvald Erikson or Thorvald Eiriksson (died 1004), Greenlandic Norse explorer, son of Erik the Red, brother to Leif Erikson
- Tom Erikson (born 1964), American mixed martial arts fighter

== See also ==
- Eriksen
- Eriksson
