= Le Havre (film) =

2011 comedy-drama film

- Festival poster
- Directed by: Aki Kaurismäki
- Written by: Aki Kaurismäki
- Produced by: Aki Kaurismäki
- Starring: André Wilms; Kati Outinen; Jean-Pierre Darroussin; Blondin Miguel
- Cinematography: Timo Salminen
- Edited by: Timo Linnasalo
- Production companies: Sputnik; Pyramide Productions; Pandora Film
- Distributed by: Future Film Distribution
- Release dates: 17 May 2011 (Cannes Film Festival); 9 September 2011 (Finland)
- Running time: 93 minutes
- Countries: Finland; France; Germany
- Language: French
- Budget: € 3.8 million
- Box office: $12,944,958

Le Havre (lit. 'The Haven') is a 2011 comedy-drama film produced, written, and directed by Aki Kaurismäki and starring André Wilms, Kati Outinen, Jean-Pierre Darroussin and Blondin Miguel. It tells the story of a shoeshiner who tries to save an immigrant child in the French port city Le Havre. The film was produced by Kaurismäki's Finnish company Sputnik with international co-producers in France and Germany. It is Kaurismäki's second French-language film, after La Vie de Bohème from 1992.

The film premiered in competition at the 2011 Cannes Film Festival, where it received the FIPRESCI Prize. Kaurismäki envisions it as the first installment in a trilogy about life in port cities. His ambition was to make follow-ups set in Spain and Germany, shot in the local languages. However, his next film The Other Side of Hope is set in Helsinki.

== Plot ==
Marcel Marx, formerly both a bohemian and struggling author, has given up his literary ambitions and relocated to the port city of Le Havre. He leads a simple life based around his wife, Arletty, his dog, Laika, his favourite bar and his low income profession as a shoeshiner. As Arletty suddenly becomes seriously ill, Marcel's path crosses with that of Idrissa, an underage undocumented immigrant from Africa. Marcel and friendly neighbors and other townspeople help to hide him from the police. The police inspector may, or may not, be hot on their heels.

== Cast ==
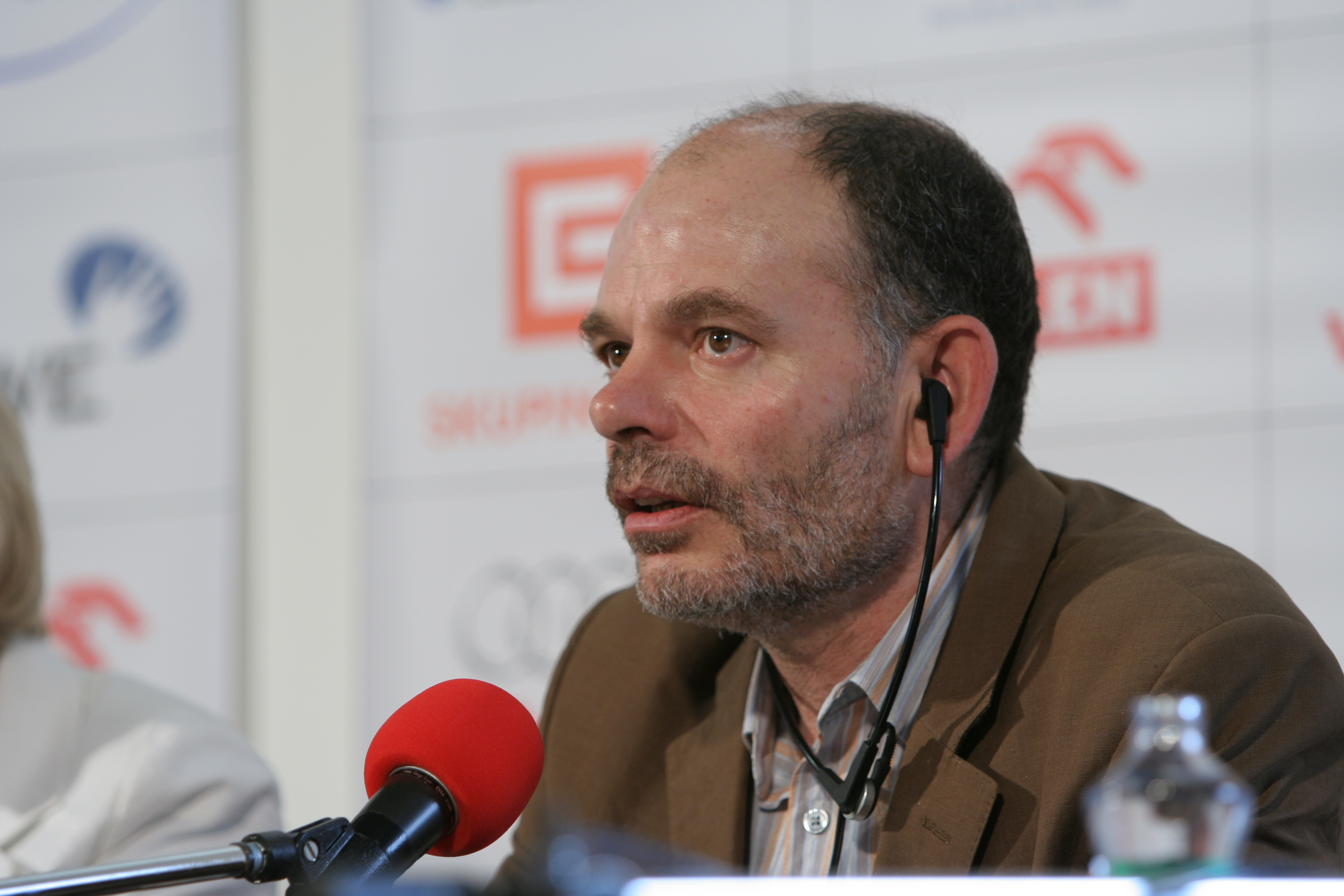

Jean-Pierre Darroussin and Little Bob

- André Wilms as Marcel Marx
- Kati Outinen as Arletty
- Jean-Pierre Darroussin as Monet
- Blondin Miguel as Idrissa
- Elina Salo as Claire
- Évelyne Didi as Yvette
- Quoc Dung Nguyen as Chang
- Laika as Laika
- François Monnié as Grocer
- Roberto Piazza (aka Little Bob) as himself
- Pierre Étaix as Doctor Becker
- Jean-Pierre Léaud as Denouncer

== Production ==
Kaurismäki had the idea of a film about an African child who arrives in Europe three years before the production started. His original intention was to set the story on the Mediterranean coast, preferably in Italy or Spain, but he had difficulties finding a suitable city. According to Kaurismäki, he "drove through the whole seafront from Genoa to Holland", and eventually settled on Le Havre in northern France, which attracted him with its atmosphere and music scene.

The script was written in the summer 2009. The names of several characters were chosen as homages to French film icons, such as Arletty and Jacques Becker. The name of the lead character, Marcel Marx, was inspired by Karl Marx. The character had previously appeared in Kaurismäki's 1992 film La Vie de Bohème, where he also was played by André Wilms. The character Monet was inspired by Porfiry Petrovich, the detective from Fyodor Dostoevsky's Crime and Punishment.

The budget was 3.8 million euro and included 750,000 euro in support from the Finnish Film Foundation. Kaurismäki's company Sputnik was the main producer, with Finnish broadcaster Yle, France's Pyramide Productions and Germany's Pandora Film as co-producers. The local rock singer Little Bob was cast in the film; Kaurismäki said that "Le Havre is the Memphis, Tennessee of France and Little Bob a.k.a. Roberto Piazza is the Elvis of this Kingdom as long as Johnny Hallyday stays in Paris and even then it would be a nice fight." Filming started 23 March and ended 12 May 2010.

== Release ==
Le Havre premiered on 17 May 2011 in competition at the 64th Cannes Film Festival. It was the fourth time a film by Kaurismäki competed at the festival, after Drifting Clouds, The Man Without a Past and Lights in the Dusk. The Finnish premiere was on 9 September 2011 through Future Film Distribution. Pyramide Distribution released it in France on 21 December of the same year. Janus Films acquired the US and Canadian distribution rights.

=== Critical response ===
On Rotten Tomatoes, the film holds a rating of 99%, based on reviews from 89 critics, with an average rating of 7.7/10. The website's critical consensus reads, "Aki Kaurismäki's deadpan wit hits a graceful note with Le Havre, a comedy/drama that's sweet, sad, and uplifting in equal measure." On Metacritic, the film has a score of 82 out of 100 based on 26 critics, indicating "universal acclaim".

Leslie Felperin wrote in Variety: "It's all rather jolly and slight, and certainly doesn't break any new ground for the Finnish auteur, even though it foregrounds more influences than usual from French filmmakers like Marcel Carné (obvious, given the protagonists' names), Jean-Pierre Melville, Robert Bresson and others. But on its own terms, Le Havre is a continual pleasure, seamlessly blending morose and merry notes with a deftness that's up there with Kaurismäki's best comic work." Felperin complimented the craft of Kaurismäki's regular cinematographer Timo Salminen and editor Timo Linnasalo, and wrote: "It's like listening to a band that's been cheerfully churning it out for years, whose members all know each other's timings inside out, not unlike onscreen performers Little Bob and his grizzled, perfectly in-sync crew."

=== Accolades ===
The film received the FIPRESCI Prize for best film at the Cannes Film Festival. It also received a Special Mention from the Ecumenical Jury. The dog Laika received a special Jury Prize from the Palm Dog jury. The film went on to win the top prize for best international film at the 2011 Munich International Film Festival. It was selected as a nominee for the European Parliament's Lux Prize. The film was selected as the Finnish entry for the Best Foreign Language Film at the 84th Academy Awards, but it did not make the final shortlist. Le Havre also won the Gold Hugo at the Chicago International Film Festival.

== See also ==
- List of submissions to the 84th Academy Awards for Best Foreign Language Film
- List of Finnish submissions for the Academy Award for Best Foreign Language Film
