= 2003 Bangkok International Film Festival =

Edition of film festival

The 2003 Bangkok International Film Festival was held from January 10 to 21, 2003 in Bangkok, Thailand.

== Festival program ==
A Bangkok International Film Festival was held in 2002, organized by Nation Multimedia Group in cooperation with the Tourism Authority of Thailand. From 2003, the Tourism Authority of Thailand took over the festival, while the Nation Group inaugurated the World Film Festival of Bangkok. For the 2003 Bangkok International Film Festival, the TAT hired Festival Management of Los Angeles, California to program and administer the festival.

The Golden Kinnaree International Competition was inaugurated in 2003, giving Golden Kinnaree Awards for Best Film, Best Director, Best Actor, Best Actress, Best Script, Best Asian Film and a Lifetime Achievement Award.

The 2003 festival opened with Frida, directed by Julie Taymor. The opening and closing films were shown at the Scala Theater in Siam Square. Festival screenings were held in various cinemas around the Siam Square area. Celebrities in attendance included Jean-Claude Van Damme, Steven Seagal and Jennifer Tilly. French director Agnès Varda was in attendance for a retrospective and to receive the Lifetime Achievement Award. A gala ball held during the festival at Queen Sirikit National Convention Center featured composer Maurice Jarre conducting the Bangkok Symphony Orchestra, performing some of his film scores.

The closing film was the world premiere of Ong-Bak, the lead-acting debut by Thai action star Tony Jaa. As a sidebar to the festival, a Guinness World Records record was set by 17 people for continuously viewing films for 64 hours, 58 minutes.

== Golden Kinnaree International Competition ==
=== Films in competition ===
- Dirty Deeds, directed by David Caesar (Australia)
- Dolls, directed by Takeshi Kitano (Japan)
- Evelyn, directed by Bruce Beresford (Ireland)
- Frida, directed by Julie Taymor (USA)
- Fureur, directed by Karim Dridi (France)
- The Man Without a Past, directed by Aki Kaurismäki (Finland)
- Mekhong Full Moon Party, directed by Jira Maligool (Thailand)
- Kedma, directed by Amos Gitai (Israel)
- The Quiet American, directed by Phillip Noyce (USA)
- Small Voices, directed by Gil Portes (Philippines)
- Supplement, directed by Krzysztof Zanussi (Poland)
- A Tale of a Naughty Girl, directed by Buddhadeb Dasgupta (India)
- Talk to Her, directed by Pedro Almodóvar (Spain)

=== Golden Kinnaree Awards ===
The awards banquet was held at Mandarin Oriental, Bangkok, with Princess Ubol Ratana presiding.

- Best Feature Film: Talk To Her
- Best Director: Pedro Almodóvar (Talk to Her)
- Best Actress: Kati Outinen (The Man Without a Past)
- Best Actor: Michael Caine (The Quiet American)
- Best Script: Aki Kaurismäki (The Man Without a Past)
- Best Asian Film: A Tale of a Naughty Girl
- Lifetime Achievement Award: Agnès Varda
