= Fallen Leaves (film) =

2023 film by Aki Kaurismäki

- Theatrical release poster
- Finnish: Kuolleet lehdet
- Literally: Dead Leaves
- Directed by: Aki Kaurismäki
- Written by: Aki Kaurismäki
- Produced by: Misha Jaari; Aki Kaurismäki; Mark Lwoff
- Starring: Alma Pöysti; Jussi Vatanen
- Cinematography: Timo Salminen
- Edited by: Samu Heikkilä
- Production companies: Sputnik Oy; Bufo; Pandora Film
- Distributed by: B-Plan Distribution (Finland); Pandora Film (Germany)
- Release dates: 22 May 2023 (Cannes); 14 September 2023 (Germany); 15 September 2023 (Finland)
- Running time: 81 minutes
- Countries: Finland; Germany
- Language: Finnish
- Budget: €1.4 million
- Box office: US$8.6 million

Fallen Leaves (Finnish: Kuolleet lehdet, lit. 'Dead Leaves') is a 2023 romantic comedy-drama film written and directed by Aki Kaurismäki. It is Kaurismäki's 20th full-length film and a continuation of his Proletariat series, which was originally planned as a trilogy and already includes Shadows in Paradise (1986), Ariel (1988), and The Match Factory Girl (1990). Alma Pöysti and Jussi Vatanen star in the main roles. The film is a co-production between Finland and Germany.

The film premiered on 22 May 2023 at the 76th Cannes Film Festival, and was selected to compete for the Palme d'Or in its main competition section, where it won the Jury Prize. It was released in Finland on 15 September 2023. It received critical acclaim and was named one of the top five international films of 2023 by the New York-based National Board of Review. The film was chosen as the Finnish entry for Best International Feature Film at the 96th Academy Awards, and was one of the 15 finalist films in the December shortlist.

== Plot ==
Ansa (Note: Finnish lit. 'trap'.) is a single woman who lives in Helsinki. She works on a zero-hour contract in a supermarket, stocking the shelves. The equally lonely and depressed Holappa works as a sandblaster and frequently drinks on the job. One night, co-worker and roommate Huotari proposes they go to a karaoke bar, and he reluctantly complies. There, the two drink heavily and Huotari sings for the audience. His singing is complimented by Liisa, who is drinking with her friend and co-worker Ansa. While Huotari tries to seduce Liisa and fails, Holappa and Ansa notice each other, but do not talk. Another night, while returning home, Ansa sees Holappa drunk and unconscious at a bus stop. After checking that he is okay, she leaves just before he wakes up.

Ansa is eventually fired for taking expired food from the supermarket. In desperate need of money, she starts working as a dishwasher at a bar for a meagre under-the-table salary. On her second day on the job, her boss is arrested for peddling drugs, and she is jobless once again, but runs into Holappa who buys her a coffee and a pastry. They later see The Dead Don't Die at the cinema and seem to hit it off. At the end of the date, she writes down her phone number for Holappa, but says she won't reveal her name until the next time they meet. While stopping to smoke a cigarette, he unknowingly drops and loses the paper from his pocket.

Ansa grows disappointed waiting for a phone call while Holappa has no way of tracking her down. Remembering that Ansa told him that she lives near the cinema, he repeatedly goes there and waits at the entrance for hours. He eventually sustains an injury at work, and is fired after failing a breathalyzer test, which also gets him kicked out of the company dormitory. Ansa and Holappa eventually reunite outside the cinema one night, and Ansa invites him over for dinner. Everything seems to go well, until she catches him drinking from a hip flask in her flat. Because of the tragedies alcoholism has caused to her family, an angry Ansa confronts Holappa, who refuses to "take orders" and storms out. Without a home, he sleeps on benches at night and gets a job in construction, but is once again fired for drinking at work. Nonetheless, he continues to despondently drink at bars.

One day, while returning from her new ironworker job, Ansa saves a homeless dog by adopting it. At home, she washes the dog and treats it with affection. Missing Ansa, who also misses him, Holappa finds housing and pours his liquor bottles down the drain. He calls Ansa (who answers with her name, while he greets her with "it's me") to apologise, and they agree to meet up right away. On his way to her house, however, he is struck by a train.

Ansa waits for him at home, oblivious to the accident. One day while walking her dog, Ansa runs into Huotari who reveals that Holappa is in a coma. Huotari also asks for Liisa's number, despite knowing she thinks he is too old for her. Ansa gives him the number and goes to the hospital. Though she only knows Holappa's surname, Ansa cons the staff by pretending to be his "sister in faith" in order to see him. Each day while Holappa is in a coma, she reads and talks to him. Meanwhile, Liisa indicates that she and Huotari have begun seeing each other.

One day, Holappa wakes up and leaves the hospital with Ansa and her dog. Holappa asks what the dog is called. She answers "Chaplin".

== Cast ==
- Alma Pöysti as Ansa
- Jussi Vatanen as Holappa
- Janne Hyytiäinen as Huotari
- Nuppu Koivu as Liisa
- Sherwan Haji as barrack resident
- Matti Onnismaa as iron foundry boss
- Simon Al-Bazoon as internet café keeper
- Martti Suosalo as Ansa's boss
- Maustetytöt as themselves
- Sakari Kuosmanen as man in the inn
- Maria Heiskanen as head nurse
- Alina Tomnikov as Tonja
- Alma the dog as Chaplin the dog
- Juho Kuosmanen (uncredited)

== Production ==
Fallen Leaves was produced by Sputnik Oy and Bufo, and co-produced by the German company Pandora Film. The production also received the support of the Finnish Film Foundation, Yle, the Finnish Broadcasting Company, ZDF/ARTE, Filmförderungsanstalt and Film-und Medienstiftung NRW.

Filming began in August 2022 in the Kallio district of Helsinki. Timo Salminen served as director of photography. Production was done "in one take" and in Kaurismäki's typical style, according to Pöysti: "don't rehearse and don't read the script too much".

The time period of the film is unclear, and it has been said to be set in an alternative reality. The wall calendar shown in the film shows autumn 2024, but the news narrated on the radio takes place in the early moments of the 2022 Russian invasion of Ukraine. Tube radios, landline phones and old-fashioned trains are used in the world of the film, among other things. It also contains several references to films, including Jim Jarmusch's The Dead Don't Die, David Lean's Brief Encounter, and Charlie Chaplin's Limelight. According to Alma Pöysti, the female lead, "the film is about lonely people with baggage, who meet later in life. It takes courage to fall in love later in life." It has been described as a tragicomedy.

== Release ==
Fallen Leaves was selected to compete for the Palme d'Or at the 2023 Cannes Film Festival, where it had its world premiere on 22 May 2023. International sales are handled by The Match Factory. In May 2023, MUBI acquired the distribution rights for North America, UK, Ireland, Latin America and Turkey. In the United States, the film was released on 17 November.

The film was screened at the Midnight Sun Film Festival on 17 June 2023. It was also invited to the 27th Lima Film Festival in the Acclaimed section, where it was screened on 10 August 2023. Following screenings at the 2023 Toronto International Film Festival and 2023 New York Film Festival.

It was released in Germany by Pandora Film on 14 September 2023, under the title Fallende Blätter. B-Plan Distribution theatrically released the film in Finland on 15 September 2023.

It was also invited at the 28th Busan International Film Festival in 'Icon' section and was screened on 6 October 2023.

== Reception ==
=== Critical response ===
On Rotten Tomatoes, the film holds an approval rating of 97% based on 169 reviews. The website's consensus reads, "A quirky tale of star-crossed lovers, Fallen Leaves is a life-affirming gem from Finnish filmmaker Kaurismäki." On Metacritic, the film has a weighted average score of 86 out of 100, based on 30 critic reviews, indicating "universal acclaim".

Reviewing the film following its Cannes premiere, Peter Bradshaw of The Guardian wrote that the film is "romantic and sweet-natured, in a deadpan style that in no way undermines or ironises the emotions involved and with some sharp things to say about contemporary politics." Glenn Kenny of RogerEbert.com gave the film four out of four stars, stating that "just an hour and twenty minutes long, the movie is a soulful romance that goes through conventional narrative paces." Time called the film a "quiet masterpiece" and possibly Kaurismäki's greatest film.

American filmmaker Dean Fleischer Camp praised the film, saying "Kaurismäki tells sincere stories about marginalized peoples struggling for the basic stuff—food, shelter, dignity, love. But the films themselves are bone-dry comedies which encourage us to laugh at the protagonists' misfortunes, or at least at the absurdity of the world's indifference to them. And by depicting such sympathetic underdogs with such a coolly detached brush, Kaurismäki evokes in us, the audience, our very best. When the lights come up, I feel radicalized toward empathy and sincerity, ready to take up arms against the cynicism within myself and against the ironic posturing that is pop culture's favorite self-defensive crouch."

In August 2023, it was voted as the Best Film of the Year by the International Film Critics Federation Fipresci.

Fallen Leaves was ranked first on Time's top 10 best films of 2023 list, and fifth on Cahiers du Cinéma's top 10 films of 2023 list. The film was included in the National Board of Review's list of the Top Five International Films of 2023. AP News listed the film among the best films of the year; of the two critics who responded to the list, Lindsey Bahr ranked the film at #6 and Jake Coyle at #1. In December 2024, Fallen Leaves was chosen by the Dicastery for Evangelization as one of the official film recommendations for the Jubilee Year 2025. Filmmakers Lisandro Alonso, Víctor Erice, Ciro Guerra, Bill Hader and Rodrigo Moreno praised the film, with Hader describing it as "Simple and beautiful storytelling."

=== Accolades ===
Award	Date of ceremony	Category	Recipient(s)	Result	Ref.
Alliance of Women Film Journalists	3 January 2024	Best Non-English-Language Film	Fallen Leaves	Nominated	
Astra Film Awards	6 January 2024	Best International Feature	Fallen Leaves	Nominated	
Astra Film Awards	6 January 2024	Best International Actress	Alma Pöysti	Nominated	
British Independent Film Awards	3 December 2023	Best International Independent Film	Aki Kaurismäki, Misha Jaari, Mark Lwoff, Reinhard Brundig	Nominated	
Cannes Film Festival	27 May 2023	Palme d'Or	Aki Kaurismäki	Nominated	
Cannes Film Festival	27 May 2023	Jury Prize	Aki Kaurismäki	Won	
César Awards	23 February 2024	Best Foreign Film	Fallen Leaves	Nominated	
Chicago International Film Festival	22 October 2023	Gold Hugo	Fallen Leaves	Nominated	
Chicago International Film Festival	22 October 2023	Silver Hugo for Best Director	Aki Kaurismäki	Won	
Dallas–Fort Worth Film Critics Association	18 December 2023	Best Foreign Language Film	Fallen Leaves	5th Place	
Dublin Film Critics Circle Awards	19 December 2023	Best Screenplay	Aki Kaurismäki	4th Place	
European Film Awards	9 December 2023	Best Film	Fallen Leaves	Nominated	
European Film Awards	9 December 2023	Best Director	Aki Kaurismäki	Nominated	
European Film Awards	9 December 2023	Best Screenwriter	Aki Kaurismäki	Nominated	
European Film Awards	9 December 2023	Best Actor	Jussi Vatanen	Nominated	
European Film Awards	9 December 2023	Best Actress	Alma Pöysti	Nominated	
European Film Awards	March 2024	Lux European Audience Film Award	Fallen Leaves	Nominated	
Gaudí Awards	18 January 2025	Best European Film	Fallen Leaves	Nominated	
Golden Globe Awards	7 January 2024	Best Picture – Non-English Language	Misha Jaari, Aki Kaurismäki and Mark Lwoff	Nominated	
Golden Globe Awards	7 January 2024	Best Actress in a Motion Picture – Comedy or Musical	Alma Pöysti	Nominated	
IndieWire Critics Poll	11 December 2023	Best International Film	Fallen Leaves	5th Place	
International Cinephile Society	11 February 2024	Best Picture	Fallen Leaves	Nominated	
International Cinephile Society	11 February 2024	Best Actress	Alma Pöysti	Nominated	
Jussi Awards	22 March 2024	Best Film	Fallen Leaves	Nominated	
Jussi Awards	22 March 2024	Best Director	Aki Kaurismäki	Nominated	
Jussi Awards	22 March 2024	Best Leading Role	Jussi Vatanen	Nominated	
Jussi Awards	22 March 2024	Audience's Favourite in Acting	Alma Pöysti	Nominated	
Miskolc International Film Festival	9 September 2023	Adolph Zukor Prize	Fallen Leaves	Won	
National Board of Review	6 December 2023	Top Five International Films	Fallen Leaves	Won (Note: This award does not have a single winner, but recognizes multiple films.)	
National Society of Film Critics Awards	6 January 2024	Best Foreign Language Film	Fallen Leaves	Won	
San Diego Film Critics Society	19 December 2023	Best Foreign Language Picture	Fallen Leaves	Nominated	
San Francisco Bay Area Film Critics Circle Awards	9 January 2024	Best International Feature Film	Fallen Leaves	Nominated	
Satellite Awards	18 February 2024	Best Actress in a Motion Picture, Comedy or Musical	Alma Pöysti	Nominated	
Satellite Awards	18 February 2024	Best Motion Picture – International	Fallen Leaves	Nominated	
St. Louis Film Critics Association	17 December 2023	Best International Film	Fallen Leaves	Nominated	
Sydney Film Festival	18 June 2023	Best Film	Fallen Leaves	Nominated	
Toronto Film Critics Association	17 December 2023	Best International Feature	Fallen Leaves	Won	
Washington D.C. Area Film Critics Association Awards	10 December 2023	Best Foreign Language Film	Fallen Leaves	Nominated	

== See also ==
- List of submissions to the 96th Academy Awards for Best International Feature Film
- List of Finnish submissions for the Academy Award for Best International Feature Film
- List of Finnish films of the 2020s
