= List of Finnish submissions for the Academy Award for Best International Feature Film =

Best International Feature Film submissions from Finland

Highlights
- Debut: 1973
- Submissions: 40
- Nominations: 1
- Oscar winners: none

Finland has submitted films for consideration in the Academy Award for Best International Feature Film (Note: The category was previously named the Academy Award for Best Foreign Language Film, but this was changed to the Academy Award for Best International Feature Film in April 2019, after the Academy deemed the word "Foreign" to be outdated.) category since 1973. The Award is handed out annually by the United States Academy of Motion Picture Arts and Sciences to a feature-length motion picture produced outside the United States that contains primarily non-English dialogue. The Finnish Academy Awards submission is selected by an expert jury which is chosen by the Finnish Film Foundation.

As of 2026, Finland was nominated only once, for The Man Without a Past (2002).

== Submissions ==
The Academy of Motion Picture Arts and Sciences has invited the film industries of various countries to submit their best film for the Academy Award for Best Foreign Language Film since 1956. The Foreign Language Film Award Committee oversees the process and reviews all the submitted films. Following this, they vote via secret ballot to determine the five nominees for the award. Below is a list of the films that have been submitted by Finland for review by the academy for the award by the year of the submission and the respective Academy Award ceremony.

The Man Without a Past (2002), directed by legendary Finnish filmmaker Aki Kaurismäki, was the country first nomination, even though the filmmaker boycotted the ceremony as a protest over the U.S. involvement in the 2003 invasion of Iraq. He also withdrew his films Drifting Clouds (1996) and Lights in the Dusk (2006), which had been selected as the country official submissions.

The Fencer (2015), Compartment No. 6 (2021), and Fallen Leaves (2023), all advanced to the December shortlists, but were not nominated.

Most of the films submitted are in Finnish, with the exception of: Seven Songs from the Tundra (2000), which was in Nenets and Russian; Le Havre (2011), which was in French; and The Fencer (2015), which was in Estonian. Below is a list of the films that have been submitted by Finland for review by the Academy.

Year (Ceremony)	Film title used in nomination	Original title	Language(s)	Director(s)	Result
1973 (46th)	The Earth Is a Sinful Song	Maa on syntinen laulu	Finnish	Rauni Mollberg	Not nominated
1980 (53rd)	Flame Top	Tulipää	Finnish	Pirjo Honkasalo and Pekka Lehto	Not nominated
1981 (54th)	Sign of the Beast	Pedon merkki	Finnish	Jaakko Pakkasvirta	Not nominated
1984 (57th)	Pessi and Illusia	Pessi ja Illusia	Finnish	Heikki Partanen	Not nominated
1986 (59th)	The Unknown Soldier	Tuntematon sotilas	Finnish	Rauni Mollberg	Not nominated
1987 (60th)	The Snow Queen	Lumikuningatar	Finnish	Päivi Hartzell	Not nominated
1990 (63rd)	The Winter War	Talvisota	Finnish	Pekka Parikka	Not nominated
1994 (66th)	Ripa Hits the Skids	Ripa ruostuu	Finnish	Christian Lindblad	Not nominated
1995 (68th)	The Last Wedding	Kivenpyörittäjän kylä	Finnish	Markku Pölönen	Not nominated
1996 (69th)	Drifting Clouds	Kauas pilvet karkaavat	Finnish	Aki Kaurismäki	Disqualified
1997 (70th)	The Collector	Neitoperho	Finnish	Auli Mantila	Not nominated
1998 (71st)	A Summer by the River	Kuningasjätkä	Finnish	Markku Pölönen	Not nominated
1999 (72nd)	The Tough Ones	Häjyt	Finnish	Aleksi Mäkelä	Not nominated
2000 (73rd)	Seven Songs from the Tundra	Seitsemän laulua tundralta	Nenets, Russian	Anastasia Lapsui and Markku Lehmuskallio	Not nominated
2001 (74th)	The River	Joki	Finnish	Jarmo Lampela	Not nominated
2002 (75th)	The Man Without a Past	Mies vailla menneisyyttä	Finnish	Aki Kaurismäki	Nominated
2003 (76th)	Elina: As If I Wasn't There	Elina - Som om jag inte fanns	Swedish, Finnish	Klaus Härö	Not nominated
2004 (77th)	Producing Adults	Lapsia ja aikuisia - Kuinka niitä tehdään?	Finnish	Aleksi Salmenperä	Not nominated
2005 (78th)	Mother of Mine	Äideistä parhain	Finnish, Swedish	Klaus Härö	Not nominated
2006 (79th)	Lights in the Dusk	Laitakaupungin valot	Finnish	Aki Kaurismäki	Withdrawn
2007 (80th)	A Man's Work	Miehen työ	Finnish	Aleksi Salmenperä	Not nominated
2008 (81st)	The Home of Dark Butterflies	Tummien perhosten koti	Finnish	Dome Karukoski	Not nominated
2009 (82nd)	Letters to Father Jacob	Postia pappi Jaakobille	Finnish	Klaus Härö	Not nominated
2010 (83rd)	Steam of Life	Miesten vuoro	Finnish	Joonas Berghäll	Not nominated
2011 (84th)	Le Havre		French	Aki Kaurismäki	Not nominated
2012 (85th)	Purge	Puhdistus	Finnish	Antti Jokinen	Not nominated
2013 (86th)	Disciple	Lärjungen	Swedish	Ulrika Bengts	Not nominated
2014 (87th)	Concrete Night	Betoniyö	Finnish	Pirjo Honkasalo	Not nominated
2015 (88th)	The Fencer	Miekkailija	Estonian, Russian	Klaus Härö	Made shortlist
2016 (89th)	The Happiest Day in the Life of Olli Mäki	Hymyilevä mies	Finnish, English	Juho Kuosmanen	Not nominated
2017 (90th)	Tom of Finland		Finnish, English	Dome Karukoski	Not nominated
2018 (91st)	Euthanizer	Armomurhaaja	Finnish	Teemu Nikki	Not nominated
2019 (92nd)	Stupid Young Heart	Hölmö nuori sydän	Finnish	Selma Vilhunen	Not nominated
2020 (93rd)	Tove		Swedish, Finnish, English, French	Zaida Bergroth	Not nominated
2021 (94th)	Compartment No. 6	Hytti nro 6	Finnish, Russian	Juho Kuosmanen	Made shortlist
2022 (95th)	Girl Picture	Tytöt tytöt tytöt	Finnish, French	Alli Haapasalo	Not nominated
2023 (96th)	Fallen Leaves	Kuolleet lehdet	Finnish	Aki Kaurismäki	Made shortlist
2024 (97th)	Family Time	Mummola	Finnish	Tia Kouvo	Not nominated
2025 (98th)	100 Litres of Gold	100 litraa sahtia	Finnish	Teemu Nikki	Not nominated
2026 (99th)	The Squirrel	Orava	Finnish	Markus Lehmusruusu	Pending

== See also ==
- List of Academy Award winners and nominees for Best International Feature Film
- List of Academy Award-winning foreign language films
- Cinema of Finland
