= La Vie de bohème (1992 film) =

- VHS cover
- Directed by: Aki Kaurismäki
- Screenplay by: Aki Kaurismäki
- Based on: Scènes de la vie de bohème by Henri Murger
- Produced by: Aki Kaurismäki
- Starring: Matti Pellonpää; Évelyne Didi; André Wilms; Kari Väänänen; Christine Murillo; Jean-Pierre Léaud
- Cinematography: Timo Salminen
- Edited by: Veikko Aaltonen
- Production company: Sputnik
- Distributed by: Finnkino
- Release dates: 18 February 1992 (Berlin International Film Festival); 28 February 1992 (Finland)
- Running time: 103 minutes
- Countries: Finland; France; Sweden; Germany
- Language: French

La Vie de bohème (or The Bohemian Life; Finnish: Boheemielämää) is a 1992 tragicomedy film directed by Aki Kaurismäki and starring Matti Pellonpää, Évelyne Didi and André Wilms. Kaurismäki's screenplay for the film was loosely based on Henri Murger's influential 1851 novel Scènes de la vie de bohème which has spawned several on-screen adaptations as well as plays and operas, the most notable being Giacomo Puccini's 1896 La bohème.

The film was a critical success earning several awards. FIPRESCI awarded the film the Forum of New Cinema award at the 1992 Berlin International Film Festival. At the 1992 European Film Awards, Matti Pellonpää and André Wilms were awarded the Best European Actor and Best Supporting Actor respectively while Évelyne Didi was nominated for the Best Supporting Actress and the film was nominated for the Best Film Award. Kaurismäki won the Best Director award at the 1993 Jussi Awards. Le Havre (2011) is a follow-up movie to La Vie de bohème having many of the same actors 19 years older.

== Plot ==
Marcel is a Parisian poet and playwright who is evicted from his room after he is unable to pay the rent. While roaming the streets, he meets Rodolfo, a painter from Albania who is equally poor and is in the country illegally. They discover they share the same love for art without regard for worldly well-being. They make another friend in Schaunard, an Irish composer who is renting Marcel's former room. The three help each other survive by sharing the little money they obtain in order to maintain a standard of living.

Rodolfo meets Mimi, a poor French girl with whom he falls madly in love. However, he is deported back to Albania. He is unable to return to Paris for six months and, by then, Mimi has found another boyfriend. Rodolfo, Marcel and Schaunard scrape together their food and share a meal to celebrate the feast of All Saints. Mimi shows up and informs Rodolfo that she has left her boyfriend to be with him again, but she is ill and dies the next spring.

== Cast ==
- Matti Pellonpää as Rodolfo
- Évelyne Didi as Mimi
- André Wilms as Marcel
- Kari Väänänen as Schaunard
- Christine Murillo as Musette
- Jean-Pierre Léaud as Blancheron
- Carlos Salgado as café waiter
- Alexis Nitzer as Henri Bernard
- Sylvie van den Elsen as Mme Bernard
- Gilles Charmant as Hugo
- Dominique Marcas as secondhand shop keeper
- Samuel Fuller as Gassot
- Jean-Paul Wenzel as Francis
- Louis Malle as man who pays Rodolfo's restaurant bill
