= Outinen =

Outinen is a Finnish surname. Notable people with the surname include:

- Kati Outinen (born 1961), Finnish actress
- Mikko Outinen (born 1971), Finnish ice hockey player
- Kristian Outinen (born 1983), Danish swimmer
