= Calamari Union =

- Film poster
- Directed by: Aki Kaurismäki
- Written by: Aki Kaurismäki
- Produced by: Aki Kaurismäki
- Starring: Timo Eränkö; Kari Heiskanen; Asmo Hurula; Sakke Järvenpää; Sakari Kuosmanen; Dave Lindholm; Mikko Mattila; Pate Mustajärvi; Tuomari Nurmio; Pirkka-Pekka Petelius; Matti Pellonpää; Pertti Sveholm; Martti Syrjä; Pantse Syrjä; Markku Toikka; Mato Valtonen; Puntti Valtonen; Kari Väänänen
- Cinematography: Timo Salminen
- Edited by: Aki Kaurismäki; Raija Talvio
- Music by: Aki Kaurismäki; Mikko Mattila; Jone Takamäki; Casablanca Vox
- Production company: Villealfa Filmproductions
- Distributed by: Finnkino
- Release date: 8 February 1985
- Running time: 81 minutes
- Country: Finland
- Language: Finnish

Calamari Union is a 1985 Finnish surreal comedy film written, directed, produced, co-edited, and co-scored by Aki Kaurismäki. It stars numerous well-known Finnish actors and rock musicians.

== Plot ==
15 desperate men, all named Frank, band together to escape the repressive Kallio district of Helsinki for the city's upscale seaside borough of Eira. Joined by an English-speaking man named Pekka, they sneak through dark alleys and the tunnels of the Helsinki metro, all the while avoiding the use of surnames to outsmart obstructing forces.

== Cast ==
- Timo Eränkö (Lapinlahden Linnut)
- Kari Heiskanen
- Asmo Hurula
- Sakke Järvenpää (Sleepy Sleepers, Leningrad Cowboys)
- Sakari Kuosmanen (Juice Leskinen Grand Slam)
- Dave Lindholm
- Mikko Mattila
- Pate Mustajärvi (Popeda)
- Tuomari Nurmio
- Pirkka-Pekka Petelius
- Matti Pellonpää
- Pertti Sveholm
- Martti Syrjä (Eppu Normaali)
- Pantse Syrjä (Eppu Normaali)
- Markku Toikka
- Mato Valtonen (Sleepy Sleepers, Leningrad Cowboys)
- Puntti Valtonen (Juice Leskinen Grand Slam)
- Kari Väänänen

== Reception ==
The film is considered to be a satirical cult classic. Caryn James of The New York Times described the film as "gleefully absurdist", adding that Kaurismäki "takes over the American gangster film and flavors it with his improbable humor". Others have drawn connections between The Saimaa Gesture and Calamari Union and the Finnish punk movement.

== Film references ==
One scene features the characters watching the 1918 film Father Sergius in a movie theater.
