= The Other Side of Hope =

- Film poster
- Directed by: Aki Kaurismäki
- Written by: Aki Kaurismäki
- Produced by: Aki Kaurismäki
- Starring: Sherwan Haji; Sakari Kuosmanen
- Cinematography: Timo Salminen
- Edited by: Samu Heikkilä
- Production companies: Sputnik; Bufo; Pandora Film
- Distributed by: B-Plan
- Release date: 3 February 2017
- Running time: 98 minutes
- Countries: Finland; Germany
- Languages: Finnish; English; Arabic
- Budget: €1,600,000
- Box office: $3,289,611

The Other Side of Hope (Finnish: Toivon tuolla puolen) is a 2017 Finnish comedy-drama film written, produced, and directed by Aki Kaurismäki. The film was produced by Kaurismäki's Finnish company Sputnik. The story is about a Finnish businessman who meets a Syrian asylum-seeker looking for his missing sister.

It was selected to compete at the main competition of the 67th Berlin International Film Festival. Where it won the Silver Bear for Best Director.

At the time of its release, Kaurismäki noted that this film would be his last as a director, although he went on to make a new film, Fallen Leaves (2023), six years later.

== Plot ==
In Helsinki, Waldemar, a traveling shirt salesman, quarrels with his wife and leaves her. He decides to leave his business and sells his remaining shirts. He gambles his earnings at a poker game and wins a lot of money. With this, he buys a restaurant. His three employees are initially skeptical of Waldemar's attempts to reinvigorate their restaurant.

At the same time, Khaled, a Syrian refugee, shows up in Helsinki illegally having stowed away on a cargo ship. He turns himself in to the police and applies for asylum. At the refugee processing facility he's sent to, he befriends Mazdak, an Iraqi refugee. Khaled asks Mazdak to help him with his search for his sister, Miriam, who was lost during their journey through the Balkans for refuge from the Syrian Civil War. When the government denies Khaled's asylum application, he escapes.

Waldemar finds Khaled hiding near his restaurant, gives him refuge, and hires him. Waldemar and his staff help Khaled get new papers. Mazdak eventually hears from Miriam. Waldemar and Khaled hire a trucker to smuggle her from Lithuania, where she was in a refugee facility. Khaled and Miriam reunite. Shortly thereafter, Khaled, while returning to Waldemar's apartment, is harassed by a racist thug who stabs him nearly to death. Waldemar sees pools of blood when he gets home, and goes out to find Khaled sitting under a tree on the bank of a river, smiling as a small dog licks his face.

== Cast ==
- Sherwan Haji – Khaled Ali
- Sakari Kuosmanen – Waldemar Wikström
- Ilkka Koivula – Calamnius, the doorman
- Janne Hyytiäinen – Nyrhinen, the cook
- Nuppu Koivu – Mirja, the waitress
- Kaija Pakarinen – wife
- Niroz Haji – Miriam
- Simon Hussein Al-Bazoon – Mazdak
- Kati Outinen – clothing store owner
- Tommi Korpela – Melartin
- Ville Virtanen
- Timo Torikka
- Elina Knihtilä
- Hannu-Pekka Björkman
- Tuomari Nurmio (Judge Bone) – himself

== Production ==
Aki Kaurismäki said he set out hoping to change perspectives on refugees in Finland. Sherwan Haji won the part of Khaled after answering a casting call for a Middle Eastern actor, Syrian preferred.

Haji commented he drew on his personal experiences to play the character, saying "It took me maybe 10 minutes to just close my eyes and think that I'm home, and then all of a sudden it rain bombs". Kaurismäki asked Haji if he played an instrument, and upon finding he did, asked Haji to bring the instrument to the set, writing a scene to incorporate this. After considering the working title The Refugee not poetic, Kaurismäki said he found his title The Other Side of Hope in an ancient Greek poem.

== Release ==
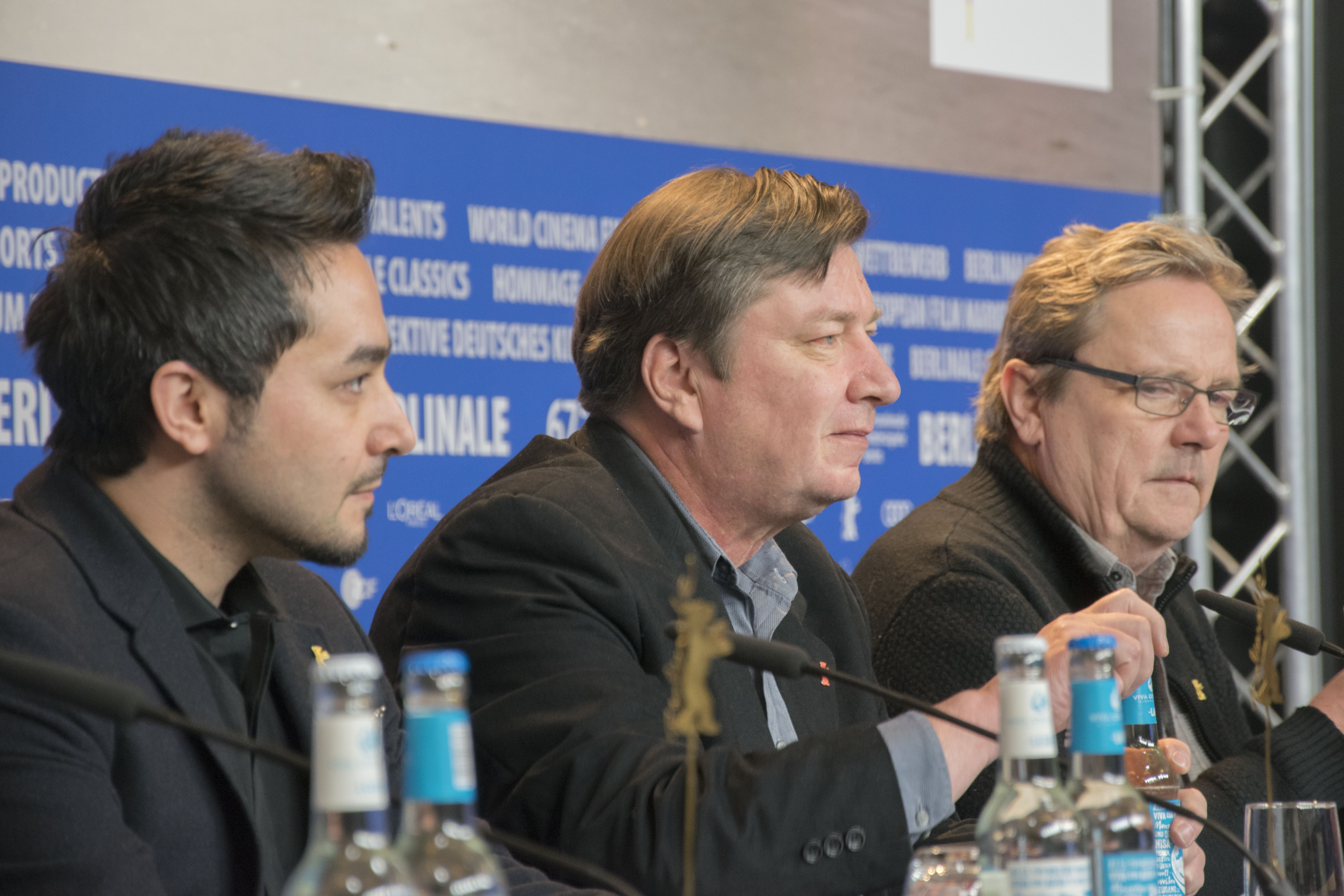
Haji, Kaurismäki and Kuosmanen at the 2017 Berlin Film Festival

In December 2016, it was announced The Other Side of Hope would play in competition at the 67th Berlin International Film Festival. The film itself was given an early February release in Finland and Curzon Artificial Eye acquired the British distribution rights, with plans to release the film in April 2017. In March 2017, Janus Films acquired the rights to distribute the film in the United States, previously distributing Kaurismäki's preceding film from 2011, Le Havre, in the country as well. The Other Side of Hope was released in the United States on 1 December 2017.

== Reception ==
The Other Side of Hope was highly acclaimed upon release.

On the review aggregator website Rotten Tomatoes, 91% of 109 critics' reviews are positive, with an average rating of 7.7/10. The website's consensus reads: "Writer-director Aki Kaurismäki further sharpens his craft with The Other Side of Hope, offering a timely drama whose melancholy air is leavened by its empathy." On Metacritic, it holds a score of 84 out of 100 based on 23 reviews, indicating "universal acclaim".

A. O. Scott of The New York Times said the film was "humane and gravely funny" and "at once honest and artful, a touching and clearsighted declaration of faith in people and in movies."

Justin Chang of the Los Angeles Times noted: "Full of brilliantly offhand gags and harrowing plot turns, this delightful comic fable expresses a belief in human decency, in the way things could be if only we all tried a little harder, that feels wise and hopeful rather than naive".

The film was chosen as the best film of 2016–17 by FIPRESCI.

=== Accolades ===
Award	Date of ceremony	Category	Recipient(s)	Result	Ref(s)
Berlin International Film Festival	18 February 2017	Silver Bear for Best Director	Aki Kaurismäki	Won	
Dublin International Film Festival	26 February 2017	Best Actor	Sherwan Haji	Won	
European Film Awards	9 December 2017	Best Film	Aki Kaurismäki	Nominated	
European Film Awards	9 December 2017	Best Director	Aki Kaurismäki	Nominated	
European Film Awards	9 December 2017	University Award	Aki Kaurismäki	Nominated	
Jerusalem Film Festival	2017	In the Spirit of Freedom Best Feature Film	Aki Kaurismäki	Won	
San Diego Film Critics Society	11 December 2017	Best Foreign Language Film		Nominated	
