= I Hired a Contract Killer =

- Directed by: Aki Kaurismäki
- Written by: Aki Kaurismäki
- Produced by: Aki Kaurismäki
- Starring: Jean-Pierre Léaud; Margi Clarke; Kenneth Colley
- Cinematography: Timo Salminen
- Edited by: Aki Kaurismäki
- Music by: Roberto Pla
- Production companies: Villealfa Filmproductions; Svenska Filminstitutet
- Distributed by: Finnkino
- Release dates: 13 September 1990 (Venice); 12 October 1990 (Finland)
- Running time: 79 minutes
- Countries: Finland; United Kingdom; Sweden; France; Germany
- Languages: English; Finnish
- Budget: £800,000

I Hired a Contract Killer is a film directed, produced and written by the Finnish auteur Aki Kaurismäki in 1990. It is a Finnish-British-German-Swedish co-production and stars the renowned French actor Jean-Pierre Léaud. The film also features a cameo appearance by Joe Strummer as a guitar player.

The film's plot device of a man arranging for an assassin to kill him but later attempting to call off the deal is also used in the more famous 1998 American film Bulworth.

== Plot ==
Henri Boulanger is a middle-aged French man leading a drab and solitary life in London. One day, he is notified that despite fifteen years of service, he has been laid off, effective immediately, from his office job at the London waterworks because the government wants to privatize the business and foreigners have to be fired first.

Without a job or friends, Henri decides to end his life but his attempt at hanging himself and gassing himself in the oven both fail. One day, Henri comes across a story in the newspaper about contract killers, so he pawns a watch and goes to the Honolulu Bar to meet them. They agree to do the job within two weeks and tell him to contact them in time if he changes his mind, though Henri assures them that he won't.

In the meantime, bored of waiting at home for the killer, Henri leaves a note on his door indicating that he's gone to the pub opposite. There, he has a chance encounter with Margaret, a woman selling flowers there, and the two immediately strike up a conversation and plan to meet in the future. Upon returning and realising that the assassin has been there, he immediately hides in his flat. The killer manages to break in but Henri escapes and decides to visit Margaret.

At Margaret's, Henri confesses that he has fallen for her, which has made him change his mind about wanting to die. Margaret advises him to visit the Honolulu Bar to cancel the order and decides to go to Henri's flat to get his belongings, thinking she is safe because the killer doesn't know her. However, Henri discovers that the Honolulu Bar has been demolished and Margaret doesn't enter his flat. The killer tails her on her way back to her own flat. However, he does not follow her into the lift, instead returning home, where he has a bloody coughing fit.

Back at Margaret's, Henri has run out of cigarettes and decides to go to the corner shop to get some. Meanwhile, the killer forces his way into Margaret's flat. Despite her attempts to deny any connection to Henri, he threatens her with his gun and forces her to wait for Henri's return with him. Upon hearing footsteps, the killer plans to make his move but Margaret knocks him unconscious. The two flee and rent a room at a hotel, where Margaret half-heartedly suggests that he go to the police to explain the situation and the two have sex.

Meanwhile, the killer, recovered, is told by the doctor that he has a form of cancer and only one to two months left to live but he decides that is still enough time to kill Henri. Back at the hotel, Henri wakes up to find that Margaret's gone. He goes out to a pub, where he sees the killer's two associates. He follows them out of the pub and into a jeweller's, where he discovers the two robbing the place. The jeweller attempts to wrestle the gun out of one of the men's hands but it goes off, killing him in the process. The thieves stuff the gun in Henri's hands and flee. Henri quickly leaves and disposes of the gun.

In the meantime, Margaret goes to a pub to sell flowers where she, by chance, meets the killer. She attempts to convince him to call off the job but he tells her that everyone has to die at some point. Returning to the hotel, the receptionist hands Margaret a letter from Henri which makes her cry. The killer follows Margaret to the hotel and presumably kills the receptionist.

Margaret goes to a French hamburger shack where she has a surprise visit with Henri, who has now found a job there. The two decide to leave the country, with Margaret leaving to pack her belongings and buy the tickets and the two meeting at the station. Meanwhile, the police catch the two jewel thieves in the process of pawning the jewellery - Henri is therefore declared innocent. However, right as he prepares to leave the burger place, the killer enters, determined to finish the job.

Henri escapes out the back of the restaurant but the killer knocks Henri's employer unconscious and catches up with him. He tells Henri that he will soon be dying but it will finally allow him to depart from life, which he considers a disappointment. He points his gun at Henri and bids him farewell, then suddenly points the gun at himself and pulls the trigger. Henri leaves and while crossing the street, is nearly hit by a taxi - the one Margaret is taking.

Some time later, Henri's employer, recovered, stands by a window in the restaurant as he smokes a cigarette and cleans his glasses.

== Cast ==
- Jean-Pierre Léaud as Henri Boulanger
- Margi Clarke as Margaret
- Kenneth Colley as The Killer
- Trevor Bowen as Department Head
- Imogen Claire as Secretary
- Angela Walsh as Landlady
- Cyril Epstein as Cab Driver
- Nicky Tesco as Pete
- Charles Cork as Al
- Michael O'Hagan as Killer's Boss
- Tex Axile as Bartender
- Walter Sparrow as Receptionist
- Tony Rohr as Frank
- Joe Strummer as Guitarist
- Peter Graves as Jeweller
- Serge Reggiani as Vic
- Ette Elliot as Daughter
- Roberto Pla as Bongo Man

== Accolades ==
- Jussi Awards – Award for Best Cinematography (Timo Salminen), Nomination for Best Leading Actor (Jean-Pierre Léaud)
- Venice Film Festival – Nomination for the Golden Lion (Aki Kaurismäki)
- Stockholm Film Festival – Nomination for the Bronze Horse (Aki Kaurismäki)

== See also ==
- Bulworth (1998)
