= Sakari Kuosmanen =

Finnish singer and actor

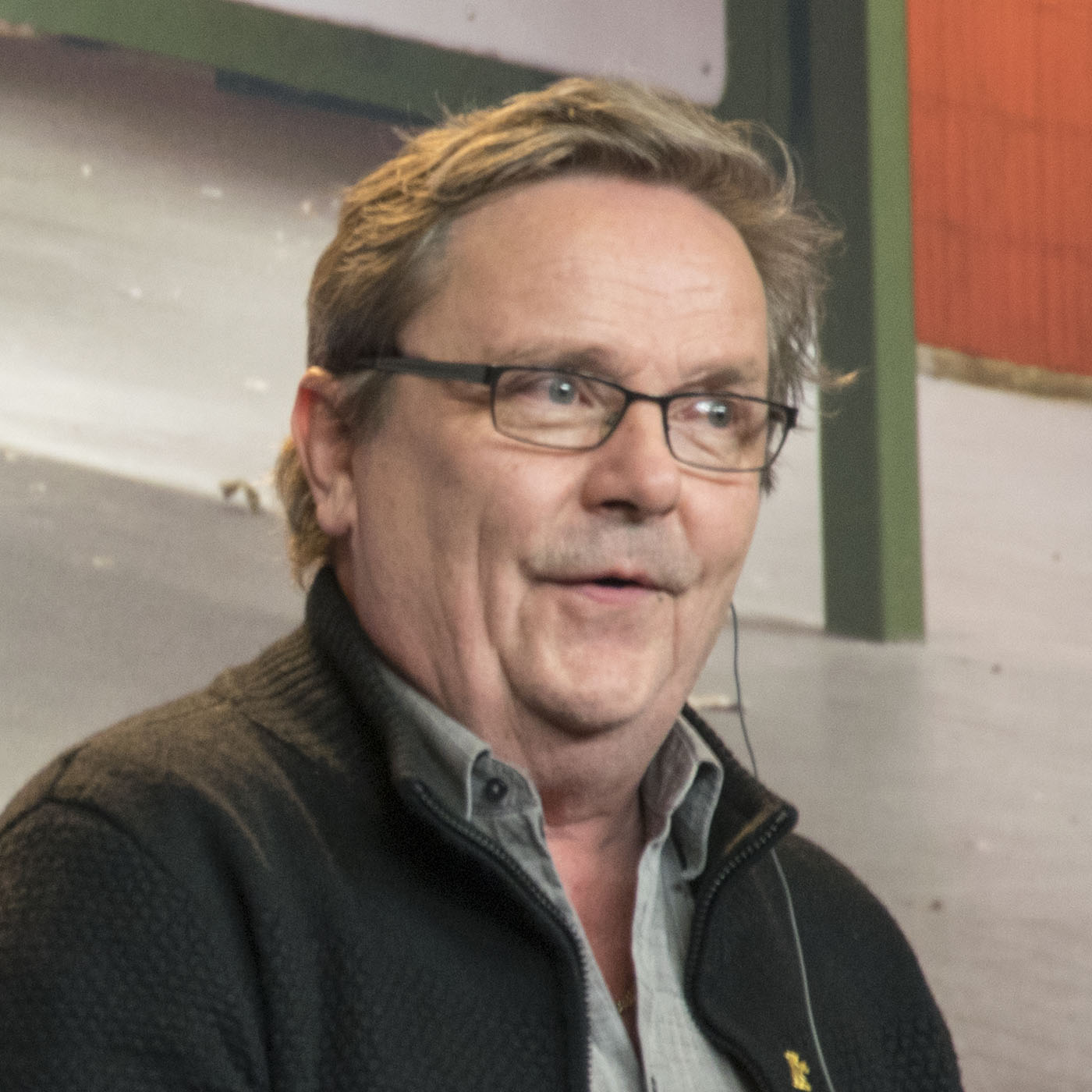
- Sakari Kuosmanen at the 2017 Berlin Film Festival
- Born: 6 September 1956 (age 69); Helsinki, Finland

Sakari Jyrki Kuosmanen (born 6 September 1956) is a Finnish singer and actor, born in Helsinki. He has recorded several solo albums and has also done work with Sleepy Sleepers and Leningrad Cowboys. He appeared as himself on the Finnish television series Aaken ja Sakun kesäkeittiö in 1999.

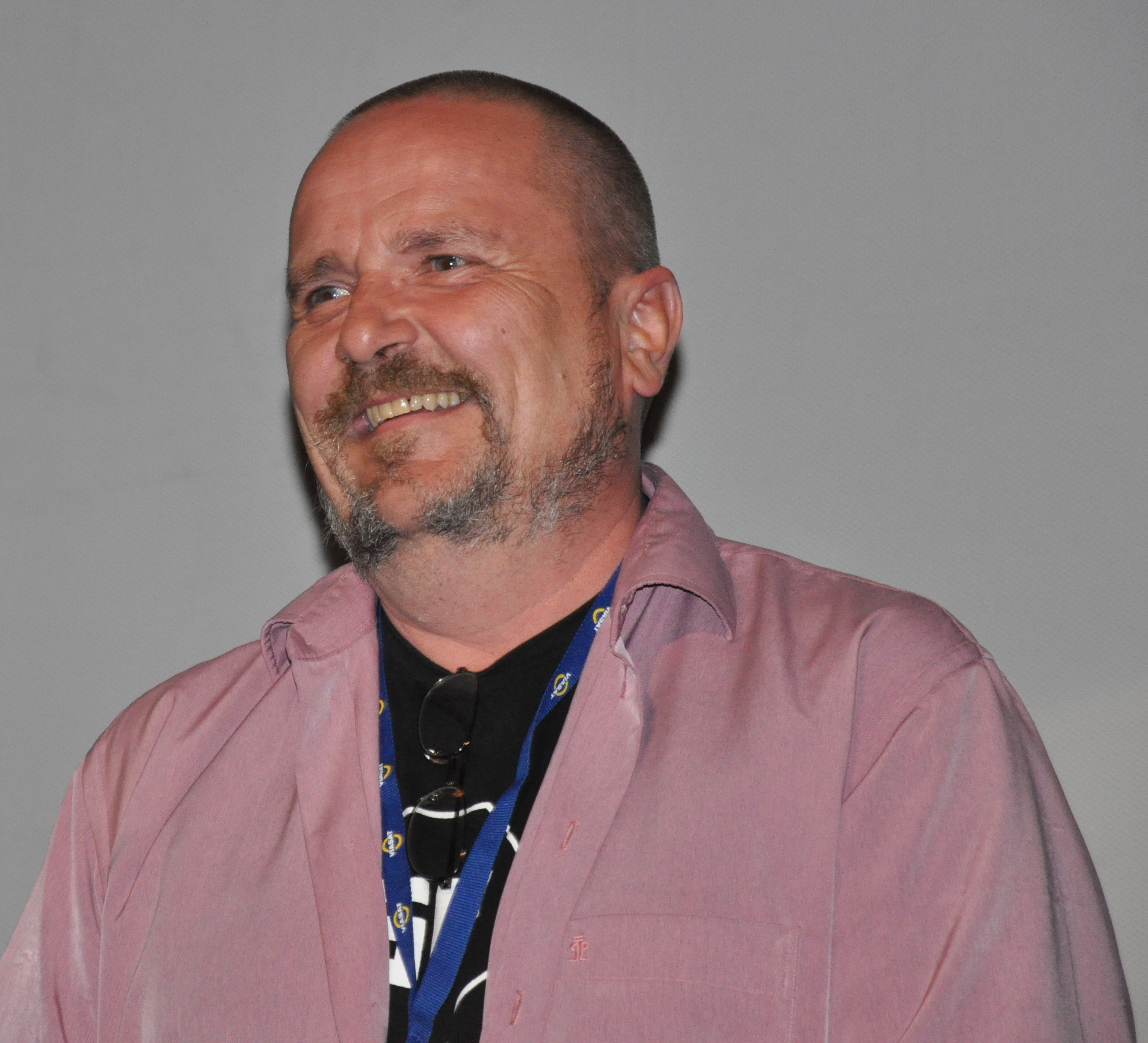
Sakari Kuosmanen in 2009

== Discography ==
=== Albums ===
- Sakari Kuosmanen (1985)
- Ihana elämä (1986)
- Suuri onni (1989)
- Kuu ja Kulkija (1995)
- Yön katseessasi (1999)
- Onnen lyhteitä (2001)
- Pieni sydän (2002)
- Entä jos... (2003)

== Filmography ==
- Calamari Union (1985)
- Rocky VI (1986)
- Shadows in Paradise (Varjoja paratiisissa, 1986)
- Thru the Wire (1987)
- Macbeth (1987)
- Helsinki Napoli All Night Long (1987)
- Ariel (1988)
- Cha Cha Cha (1989)
- Leningrad Cowboys Go America (1989)
- Night on Earth (1991)
- Iron Horsemen (1995)
- Drifting Clouds (Kauas pilvet karkaavat, 1996)
- Sen täytyy tapahtua (1999)
- Juha (1999)
- The Man Without a Past (Mies vailla menneisyyttä, 2002)
- Pearls and Pigs (Helmiä ja sikoja, 2003)
- The Other Side of Hope (Toivon tuolla puolen, 2017)
- Fallen Leaves (Kuolleet lehdet, 2023)
- The Missile (Ohjus, 2024)
