= Crime and Punishment (1983 film) =

- DVD cover
- Directed by: Aki Kaurismäki
- Screenplay by: Aki Kaurismäki; Pauli Pentti
- Based on: Crime and Punishment; 1866 novel by Fyodor Dostoevsky
- Produced by: Mika Kaurismäki
- Starring: Markku Toikka; Aino Seppo; Esko Nikkari; Hannu Lauri; Olli Tuominen; Matti Pellonpää
- Cinematography: Timo Salminen
- Edited by: Veikko Aaltonen
- Music by: Pedro Hietanen
- Production company: Villealfa Filmproductions
- Distributed by: Finnkino
- Release date: 2 December 1983
- Running time: 93 minutes
- Country: Finland
- Language: Finnish

Crime and Punishment (Finnish: Rikos ja rangaistus) is a 1983 film directed by Aki Kaurismäki. It is the first full-length film by Kaurismäki and is based on Fyodor Dostoevsky's 1866 novel of the same title, Crime and Punishment. The main character in the film is called Rahikainen.

In 1984, it received two Jussi Awards: for best début film and best script.

== Plot ==
A slaughterhouse worker, Antti Rahikainen, murders a man. A woman from a catering service who has arrived to set up a party is the only witness—she elects not to call the police but tells him to leave. As the police hunt him, Rahikainen skips work and begins to wander Helsinki, seeing an article about the murder in the newspaper. His colleague tells him to take the week off. He finds the woman who witnessed the murder, Eeva Laakso, and tells her to meet him after her shift, where he tells her to remember the words Silver Lining Hostel. He arrives home and finds that he's been subpoenaed for the murder. At the police station the following day, he is questioned about his whereabouts at the time of the murder and his relationship to Kari Honkanen, the businessman who had been murdered. It is revealed that three years ago, Rahikainen's fiancée was killed by Honkanen in a drink-driving crash, and when the court did not charge him, Rahikainen swore to take revenge. Eeva arrives at the station and again does not identify Rahikainen as the murderer, forcing the cops to release him.

Rahikainen and Eeva meet up on a ferry at night, where he tells her he killed Honkanen because he "found him disgusting" and "wanted to show that things are less simple than people think". As Rahikainen shirks his job and plans to leave the country, he and Eeva begin spending more time together. She finds the gun at his apartment and pockets it. A man pursuing Eeva, Heinonen, who has been spying on them through the walls, locks Eeva in his hotel room and threatens to go to the police about Rahikainen if she does not accept his marriage proposal. She escapes by threatening him with the gun.

As Heinonen goes to confront Rahikainen, he is hit by a tram and dies. Police Inspector Pennanen continues to suspect Rahikainen for the crime, but another man confesses and is charged, allowing him to get off. Rahikainen is wracked by guilt over the murder and the events of the past few days and is unsure what to do.

With his new fake passport, Rahikainen and his friend prepare to board the night ferry to Stockholm, however, just before leaving, Rahikainen catches one last glimpse of Eeva. This convinces him to go to the police station and turn himself in. He is sentenced to eight years, where in prison he tells Eeva that "I killed a louse and I became a louse myself".

== Cast ==
- Markku Toikka as Antti Rahikainen
- Aino Seppo as Eeva Laakso
- Esko Nikkari as Inspector Pennanen
- Hannu Lauri as Heinonen - Eeva's Boss
- Olli Tuominen as Detective Snellman
- Matti Pellonpää as Nikander
