= Timo Salminen =

Finnish cinematographer

- Born: Timo Oskari Salminen; 11 July 1952 (age 73); Helsinki
- Years active: 1981–present
- Children: Nea Salminen, Toni Salminen, Antonio Salminen, Maria Salminen, Joana Salminen, Vera Salminen, Anastasia Salminen

Timo Salminen (11 July 1952 in Helsinki) is a Finnish cinematographer best known for his artistic work in Aki Kaurismäki's films. Salminen's father Ville Salminen was a famed Finnish film actor, director, writer and producer whose career began in the 1930s and lasted until the 1980s. His older step brother Ville-Veikko Salminen was a comedic actor whose career also lasted over 50 years.

For his work in Kaurismäki's films, Salminen has been awarded five Jussi Awards for Best Cinematography while being nominated for three more. He was also twice nominated for the Best Cinematographer award at the European Film Awards.

== Partial filmography ==
- The Worthless (1982)
- Crime and Punishment (1983)
- Calamari Union (1985)
- Shadows in Paradise (1986)
- Hamlet Goes Business (1987)
- Ariel (1988)
- Leningrad Cowboys Go America (1989)
- The Match Factory Girl (1990)
- I Hired a Contract Killer (1990)
- La Vie de Bohème (1992)
- The Last Border (1993)
- Take Care of Your Scarf, Tatiana (1994)
- Leningrad Cowboys Meet Moses (1994)
- Drifting Clouds (1996)
- Juha (1999)
- The Classic (2001)
- The Man Without a Past (2002)
- Pelicanman (2004)
- Lights in the Dusk (2006)
- Le Havre (2011)
- Jauja (2014)
- The Other Side of Hope (2017)
- Woman at Sea (2022)
- Fallen Leaves (2023)
- Eureka (2023)
