= Shadows in Paradise (1986 film) =

- DVD cover
- Directed by: Aki Kaurismäki
- Written by: Aki Kaurismäki
- Produced by: Mika Kaurismäki
- Starring: Matti Pellonpää; Kati Outinen; Sakari Kuosmanen
- Cinematography: Timo Salminen
- Edited by: Raija Talvio
- Production company: Villealfa Filmproductions
- Distributed by: Finnkino
- Release date: 17 October 1986
- Running time: 74 minutes
- Country: Finland
- Language: Finnish

Shadows in Paradise (Finnish: Varjoja paratiisissa) is a 1986 Finnish comedy-drama art film written and directed by Aki Kaurismäki. The film stars Kati Outinen as Ilona and Matti Pellonpää as Nikander.

Shadows in Paradise was awarded the Best Film award at the 1987 Jussi Awards.

This is the first film in Kaurismäki's Proletariat Trilogy (Shadows in Paradise, Ariel, and The Match Factory Girl). The trilogy has been released on Region One DVD by Criterion, in their Eclipse box-sets, and on region-free Blu-rays by Future Film in the Nordic area.

== Plot ==
Ilona is a supermarket check-out clerk who meets Nikander, a lonely garbage man, and they develop romantic feelings towards each other.

== Cast ==
- Matti Pellonpää as Nikander
- Kati Outinen as Ilona Rajamäki
- Sakari Kuosmanen as Melartin
- Esko Nikkari as Co-worker
- Kylli Köngäs as Ilona’s Girlfriend
- Pekka Laiho as Shop Steward
- Jukka-Pekka Palo as Third Man
- Svante Korkiakoski as Police
- Mato Valtonen as Pelle
- Aki Kaurismäki as Hotel Clerk (uncredited cameo)
