= Ariel (1988 film) =

- Theatrical release poster
- Directed by: Aki Kaurismäki
- Written by: Aki Kaurismäki
- Produced by: Aki Kaurismäki
- Starring: Turo Pajala; Susanna Haavisto; Matti Pellonpää; Eetu Hilkamo
- Cinematography: Timo Salminen
- Edited by: Raija Talvio
- Music by: Esko Rahkonen; Rauli Somerjoki; Taisto Tammi
- Production company: Villealfa Filmproductions
- Distributed by: Finnkino
- Release date: 21 October 1988
- Running time: 72 minutes
- Country: Finland
- Language: Finnish

Ariel is a 1988 Finnish drama film directed and written by Aki Kaurismäki. The film tells the story of Taisto Kasurinen (Turo Pajala), a Finnish miner who must find a way to live in the big city after the mine closes.

Taisto's friend is played by Matti Pellonpää, an actor who appeared in many of Kaurismäki's early films, before his death in 1995.

This is the second film in Kaurismäki's Proletariat Trilogy (Shadows in Paradise, Ariel, and The Match Factory Girl). The trilogy has been released on Region One DVD by Criterion in its Eclipse box-sets. The film is included in the 1001 Movies You Must See Before You Die list. The film was entered into the 16th Moscow International Film Festival, where Turo Pajala won the Bronze St. George for Best Actor.

Kaurismäki has called Ariel his best film in his career.

== Plot ==
A mine gets closed in Finnish Lapland, putting a number of miners including Taisto Kasurinen (Turo Pajala), out of work. In a café, an older miner advises Kasurinen that there is no future in mining. He gives Kasurinen the keys to an old (1962) white Cadillac convertible, then walks into the men's room and shoots himself. Kasurinen drives the convertible to southern Finland, where he is mugged and has his life savings stolen. He gets a labouring job and finds a cheap bed at a nearby hostel.

Impressed with the Cadillac, metermaid Irmeli flirts with Kasurinen. Rather than waiting for her shift to end, she quits her job to accept his dinner invitation. In bed together at her home, they discuss their pasts. Irmeli recounts stories of her ex-husband and Kasurinen tells her that he is from the country, to which she replies "that's different". He is woken up by Irmeli's young son holding a gun in his face and offering him breakfast.

Kasurinen is kicked out of the hostel when he fails to pay for his bed and begins sleeping in his car. In need of money, he reluctantly sells it. He drifts around the city, occasionally smoking cigarette butts left in ashtrays. While sitting in a diner, he spots one of the men who robbed him, chases him, grabs the knife the man pulls out and holds him at knifepoint. The police arrest Kasurinen for attempted armed robbery. He is sentenced to nearly two years in jail. As he is leaving the courtroom, he makes eye contact with a distressed Irmeli from across the room.

Kasurinen proposes marriage to Irmeli during one of her visits to prison and Irmeli accepts. Later, Irmeli brings him a birthday cake and a book with a saw inside it. He and his cellmate Mikkonen (Matti Pellonpää) escape together. Outside, Kasurinen and Irmeli get married. Kasurinen and Mikkonen rob a bank to fund their journey out of the country. The men who had promised them passports stab Mikkonen in order to get the loot for themselves. Kasurinen shoots them dead but is unable to save Mikkonen. The film ends with Kasurinen, Irmeli and her son boarding a ship named Ariel, heading to Mexico.

== Cast ==
- Turo Pajala as Taisto Kasurinen
- Susanna Haavisto as Irmeli
- Matti Pellonpää as Mikkonen
- Eetu Hilkamo as Riku
- Erkki Pajala as miner
- Matti Jaaranen as mugger
- Hannu Viholainen as accomplice
- Jorma Markkula as tallyman
- Tarja Keinänen as woman in the harbour
- Eino Kuusela as man on the beach

== Home media ==
A digitally restored version of the film was released on DVD by The Criterion Collection as part of its Eclipse Series.
