= Bangkok International Film Festival =

Annual festival held in Bangkok, Thailand

- Location: Bangkok, Thailand
- Founded: 2003
- Awards: The Golden Kinnaree Awards
- Website: https://bangiff2017.wixsite.com/bangiff1

The Bangkok International Film Festival (BKKIFF) (Thai: เทศกาลภาพยนตร์นานาชาติกรุงเทพฯ) is an international film festival held annually in Bangkok, Thailand, since 2003. In addition to film screenings, seminars, gala events and the Golden Kinnaree Awards.

== History ==
=== First years ===
The Bangkok International Film Festival was first held in 2003 and was organized by Nation Multimedia Group in cooperation with the Tourism Authority of Thailand, or TAT. Before 2003, the Nation Group had organized the Bangkok Film Festival (note, no "international" in the title), first held in 1998. After the 2003 event, the Nation Group, and the TAT split. The TAT continued with the Bangkok International Film Festival in 2004, while Nation Multimedia founded the World Film Festival of Bangkok, which was first held in October 2003.

For management of the Bangkok International Film Festival, the TAT awarded a contract to a Los Angeles, California firm, Festival Management, which programmed the festival from 2003 to 2006.

Such celebrities as Catherine Deneuve, Jeremy Irons, Michael Douglas, Jean-Claude Van Damme, Steven Seagal, Bai Ling, Christopher Lee, Oliver Stone, Terry Gilliam and Joel Schumacher were flown to Bangkok to attend the festivals, and were present for such events as red carpet-festooned opening ceremonies, cocktail parties and awards banquets.

=== Post-coup festival, bribery scandal ===
After the 2006 Thai coup d'état, the government installed by the military-run Council for National Security reduced the budget for the film festival by two-thirds from 180 million baht to 60 million baht. As a result of the cuts, the TAT broke its management contract with Festival Management and then postponed the 2007 edition of the festival from January to July. With a focus on Asian cinema, the resulting festival was a lower-key affair than in previous years. However, it did host a visit by Indian actress Hema Malini, who was the subject of a retrospective program.

Following the 2007 event, management of the festival was transferred from the TAT to the Department of Export Promotion.

In December 2007, the United States Department of Justice arrested Gerald and Patricia Green, the owners of Festival Management. In an affidavit by a Federal Bureau of Investigation agent, the Greens were accused of violating the Foreign Corrupt Practices Act for their alleged payment of US$1.7 million in bribes to a person the affidavit identified as the governor of the Tourism Authority of Thailand.

In Thailand, Juthamas Siriwan, who served as TAT governor from 2002 to 2006, denied any wrongdoing. Still, in the days before the December 23, 2007, general election, she resigned from the For the Motherland party, of which she served as deputy leader.

As an appointed Governor of the TAT by Thaksin Shinawatra's Thai Rak Thai Government, the former governor is now indicted in the US for taking bribes concerning the film festival.

In late February 2008, the website of the TAT announced that the 2008 Bangkok International Film Festival would be held in July. It was then postponed and held in September 2008, with TAT as the main sponsor but with the Federation of National Film Associations and the Thai Film Directors Association as the organizers.

In 2025, it was reported that the festival would return after sixteen years of absence.

== Program ==
=== Competition program ===
==== International competition ====
Up to 12 international feature films can be selected for competition and judged by an international jury. Awards are presented for Best International Film, Best International Director, Best International Actor, and Best International Actress.

==== ASEAN competition ====
Seeks to present the best films from the past year from ASEAN countries: Brunei, Cambodia, Indonesia, Laos, Malaysia, Myanmar, the Philippines, Singapore, Thailand and Vietnam. The films in this competition are judged by members of FIPRESCI, the International Federation of Film Critics, and the winning film receives the Golden Kinaree for Best ASEAN Film.

==== Reel World ====
A program of recent feature-length documentaries collected from countries all around the world. A Golden Kinnaree is awarded for Best International Feature Documentary.

==== New Voices ====
A selection of 10 to 15 international features from first- or second-time feature directors. The winning film will be presented with the award for Best New Director.

==== Asian Short Films ====
This competition includes live-action, animation, and documentary short films from all over Asia. There is an award presented for Best Asian Short Film.

=== Non-competition program ===
==== Thai Panorama ====
A collection of what the organizers determine as the most distinctive Thai films made and released over the past 12 months, as well as premieres of new films made in Thailand.

==== Tributes and retrospectives ====
Each year, the festival offers a glimpse into the life and career of its honored film personalities, including directors, actors, and technicians, through a selection of what the organizers consider their finest cinematic moments.

==== Special presentations ====
This program consists of gala premieres and special screenings of new releases as well as restored copies of old classics, frequently accompanied by special festive activities such as concerts, outdoor screenings, and appearances by stars, directors, and crew members of the old films.

==== Windows on the World ====
A celebration of what the organizers determine to be the best of the world cinema, showcasing about 80 films from countries around the world, reflecting the international language of cinema. The selection includes critically acclaimed films from other leading festivals such as the Cannes Film Festival, Berlin Film Festival, Venice Film Festival, and Toronto International Film Festival.

== Golden Kinnaree Awards ==
The annual Awards Gala presents The Golden Kinnaree Awards to the winning films and filmmakers. Awards are presented in the following categories:

=== Competitive awards ===
- Best Film
- Best Director
- Best Actor
- Best Actress
- Best Cinematographer
- Best ASEAN Film
- Best Asian Short Film
- Best Feature Documentary
- New Voices Award (Best New Director)
- The Jameson Thai People's Choice Award

=== Achievement Awards ===
- Lifetime Achievement Award(s)
- Career Achievement Award(s)
- Award for Outstanding Contribution to the Promotion of Asian Cinema
- Crystal Lens Award (Career Achievement in Cinematography)
- Asian Eyes Award (Excellence in Asian Cinematography)
- Thai Box Office Award (highest-grossing Thai film in the previous year)

== Particular years ==
- 2003 Bangkok International Film Festival
- 2004 Bangkok International Film Festival
- 2005 Bangkok International Film Festival
- 2006 Bangkok International Film Festival
- 2007 Bangkok International Film Festival
- 2025 Bangkok International Film Festival

== See also ==
- Cinema of Thailand
- List of cinemas in Thailand
- Thai Short Film and Video Festival
- World Film Festival of Bangkok
