= Steam of Life =

- Theatrical release poster
- Directed by: Joonas Berghäll; Mika Hotakainen
- Written by: Joonas Berghäll; Mika Hotakainen
- Produced by: Joonas Berghäll
- Cinematography: Heikki Farm; Jani Kumpulainen
- Edited by: Timo Peltola
- Music by: Jonas Bohlin
- Production companies: Oktober Oy; Rode Orm Film AB
- Release dates: 26 January 2010 (DocPoint); 30 July 2010 (United States)
- Running time: 84 minutes
- Country: Finland
- Language: Finnish

Steam of Life (Finnish: Miesten vuoro) is a Finnish documentary film about male saunas directed by Joonas Berghäll and Mika Hotakainen. The movie was produced by Joonas Berghäll.

It opened theatrically in New York City on 30 July 2010 and opened in Los Angeles on 6 August 2010 at the 14th Annual DocuWeeks.

== Recognition ==
It was selected as the Finnish entry for the Best Foreign Language Film at the 83rd Academy Awards, but it didn't make the final shortlist.

It is the first documentary film to represent Finland at the Academy Awards. It was also nominated for "Best Documentary" at the 23rd European Film Awards.

It won the Best International Cinematography at the Documentary Edge Festival in New Zealand in 2011.

== See also ==
- List of submissions to the 83rd Academy Awards for Best Foreign Language Film
- List of Finnish submissions for the Academy Award for Best Foreign Language Film
