= The Match Factory Girl =

- VHS cover
- Directed by: Aki Kaurismäki
- Written by: Aki Kaurismäki
- Produced by: Aki Kaurismäki; Klas Olofsson; Katinka Faragó
- Starring: Kati Outinen; Elina Salo; Esko Nikkari; Vesa Vierikko; Reijo Taipale
- Cinematography: Timo Salminen
- Edited by: Aki Kaurismäki
- Production companies: Villealfa Filmproductions; Svenska Filminstitutet
- Distributed by: Finnkino
- Release date: 12 January 1990
- Running time: 69 minutes
- Countries: Finland; Sweden
- Language: Finnish
- Box office: SEK 131,180 (Sweden)

The Match Factory Girl (Finnish: Tulitikkutehtaan tyttö) is a 1990 Finnish-Swedish film edited, written, co-produced, and directed by Aki Kaurismäki, the final installment of his Proletariat Trilogy, after his Shadows in Paradise and Ariel. It follows Iris, a young, plain-looking factory worker living a lonely, impoverished and uneventful life in late 1980s Finland. Iris is played by Kati Outinen, who had appeared in a number of other Kaurismäki films.

The Match Factory Girl has often been considered one of the most esteemed Finnish movies. It was tied for "best Finnish movie" in a polling of film critics in 1992.

== Plot ==
Iris lives with her middle-aged mother and stepfather, who spend most of their time watching the news on television. They expect her to give them all of her match factory production line job earnings as well as do all the housework. She goes to dances but does not attract partners. She buys a highly coloured dress in the hope that this will increase her appeal. Seeing it, her parents call her a whore and demand she return it, but she defies them and wears it to a dance club.

At the club, Iris meets Aarne, who thinks she is a prostitute because of the dress, although Iris does not realize that. They spend the night together at his plush apartment. Aarne departs the next morning before Iris awakes, leaving money for her on the bedside table. Iris leaves her number and, after waiting in vain for Aarne to phone her, visits him and arranges a second date. Aarne meets her parents when he calls for her. At the end of the dinner, Aarne harshly informs her that he does not seek her affection and tells her to leave. She returns home and spends the rest of the evening in tears.

Iris later discovers she is pregnant and writes to Aarne asking him to raise the child with her. She receives a reply simply stating "Get rid of the brat," along with a cheque for 10,000 markka. Iris becomes distraught and goes outside, leaving the letter and cheque on the table, where her mother finds them. While wandering around upset, Iris is hit by a car and has a miscarriage. Her stepfather visits Iris in the hospital and tells her she must move out of the apartment because she has caused her mother great pain.

Iris moves in with her brother and becomes increasingly despondent. She buys rat poison, mixes it with water, and puts it into a small bottle, which she puts into her handbag. She goes to Aarne's apartment and tells him she wants a drink. Aarne brings the drinks, but Iris asks for ice, and when Aarne goes to get it, Iris pours some of the mixture into his drink. When Aarne returns, she tells him that everything is taken care of and that he need not worry because this will be the last time he will see her. She returns his cheque, quickly drinks most of her drink, and leaves. Aarne sits quietly for a few moments, then drinks his drink.

On the way home, Iris goes into a bar, orders a beer, takes a seat at the bar, and starts reading. A man sits beside her, uninvited, and tries to catch her attention. Iris smiles at the man, takes the poison out and pours some into his glass. She leaves, and the man finishes his drink.

Iris visits her mother and stepfather. She prepares a meal for them and pours the rest of the poison into their bottle of vodka while they are next door. While they eat, Iris sits in the living room smoking and listening to music. After a while, she gets up to look and sees her parents are dead.

The next day at work, Iris is taken away by the police.

== Cast ==
- Kati Outinen as Iris
- Elina Salo as mother
- Esko Nikkari as stepfather
- Vesa Vierikko as Aarne
- Reijo Taipale as singer
- Silu Seppälä as brother
- Outi Mäenpää as workmate
- Marja Packalén as doctor
- Richard Reitinger as man in the bar
- Helka Viljanen as office employee
- Kurt Siilas as policeman
- Ismo Keinänen as policeman
- Klaus Heydemann as worker

== Release ==
=== Critical response ===
In August 2011, Roger Ebert added the film to his list of Great Movies. He wrote that he "watched hypnotically. Few films are ever this unremittingly unyielding... What made it more mesmerizing is that it's all on the same tonal level: Iris passively endures a series of humiliations, cruelties and dismissals".

=== Home media ===
The Match Factory Girl was released on a region-free Blu-ray by Future Film in Finland on 3 December 2013. The release includes five available subtitles (Swedish, English, Norwegian, and Danish in addition to Finnish) along with Kaurismäki's short film Bico, a segment of the 2004 anthology film Visions of Europe.

== See also ==
- List of films considered the best
- The Little Match Girl
