= Kristian Outinen =

Danish swimmer

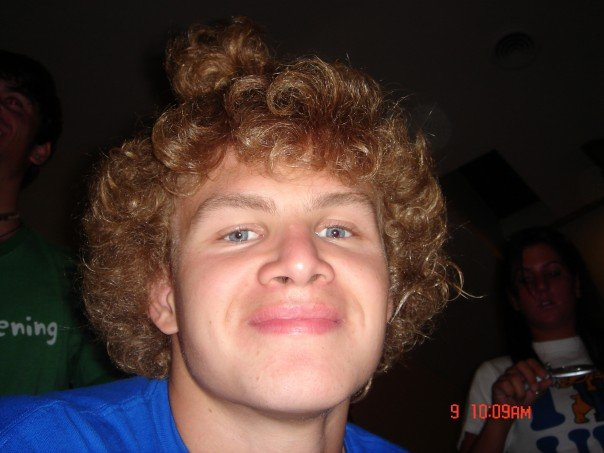

Personal information
- Full name: Kristian McGrady Outinen
- Nicknames: Denny; The Flying Finn; Dens; Jahoserif
- Nationality: Denmark
- Born: 23 January 1983 (age 43) Copenhagen, Denmark
- Weight: 214 Lbs

Sport
- Sport: Swimming
- Strokes: Breaststroke, Individual Medley
- Club: Vestegnens Aqua Team
- College team: University of Kentucky Wildcats

Kristian McGrady Outinen (born 23 January 1983) is a Danish swimmer. He is a current member of the Danish national swimming team. Outinen is a Danish national record holder in both the 100 meter individual medley (IM) and the 50 meter breaststroke. He currently swims for the Vestegnens Aqua Team (VAT) based out of Copenhagen.

Outinen attended the University of Kentucky receiving his degree in liberal arts specializing in classical guitar. He completed his degree in three and a half years. Outinen was named to the Deans list in 2005 having a GPA of 4.0 for the semester. Outinen was an integral part of the University of Kentucky varsity swim team. His versatility was widely recognized and cherished by the coaches. He was especially close with the weight training staff. Kristian still holds top ten times in five events for the Wildcats.

The yard based training provided a perfect background for Outinen's return to Europe's 25 meter based events. After returning from the United States, Outinen resumed swimming and quickly excelled on the national scene. In October 2008 he broke his first Danish national record in the 50 meter breaststroke in Kolding, Denmark. He then proceeded to also break the 100 meter IM national record at the same meet. In December 2008 Outinen broke his own record in the 50 meter breaststroke at the European Short Course Championships in Rijeka, Croatia.

Outinen later joined a Danish progressive metal band, BOIL. BOIL released aXiom, a critically acclaimed album, on 19 February 2013.

== Personal bests ==
Event	Time	Location
50m Breaststroke	27.55	Rijeka, Croatia
100m Breaststroke	1:01.24	Esbjerg, Denmark
100m IM	54.37	Kolding, Denmark
5 Kilometer Run	21:26	Lexington, USA
