= Évelyne Didi =

French actress

Évelyne Didi is a French actress, sister of the philosopher and art historian Georges Didi-Huberman. She has appeared in more than thirty films since 1978.

== Selected filmography ==
Year	Title	Role	Notes
2010	A Distant Neighborhood	Yvette	
2010	Angel & Tony	Myriam	
1992	La Vie de Bohème		
1990	Tatie Danielle		
1989	Baxter		
1983	One Deadly Summer		
1981	Eaux profondes		
