= Drifting Clouds (film) =

- Drifting Clouds DVD cover
- Directed by: Aki Kaurismäki
- Written by: Aki Kaurismäki
- Produced by: Aki Kaurismäki
- Starring: Kati Outinen; Kari Väänänen; Elina Salo; Sakari Kuosmanen
- Cinematography: Timo Salminen
- Edited by: Aki Kaurismäki
- Music by: Shelley Fisher
- Production company: Sputnik
- Distributed by: Sputnik
- Release date: 26 January 1996
- Running time: 97 minutes
- Country: Finland
- Language: Finnish
- Budget: FIM 5,562,154 (approx. € 935,000)

Drifting Clouds (Finnish: Kauas pilvet karkaavat) is a 1996 Finnish comedy drama film edited, written, produced, and directed by Aki Kaurismäki and starring Kati Outinen, Kari Väänänen and Markku Peltola. The film is the first in Kaurismäki's Finland trilogy, the other two films being The Man Without a Past and Lights in the Dusk.

== Plot ==
Ilona Koponen, a head waitress at Dubrovnik restaurant, is married to Lauri, a tram driver. They live in a small, modestly furnished apartment in Helsinki. As they come home from work late one night, Lauri surprises Ilona with a television which he purchased on hire purchase. They talk about whether they can meet their financial obligations, but agree that the TV payments are manageable.

Next day, as Lauri gets to work, he learns that the company will be laying off workers due to the non-profitability of certain tram routes and he is randomly chosen as one of those. The day after Lauri has finished his last shift, Ilona is informed by the owner of Dubrovnik that the restaurant is being sold to a chain and that all employees will be let go since the new company will be bringing in its own staff.

Both start looking for work but with discouraging results. Lauri is offered a job as a bus driver but is unable to pass the medical exam and subsequently loses his professional driver's licence. Ilona gets a job at a rundown bar/restaurant which does not even have a name and is owned by a tax-evading crook. After six weeks, the restaurant gets shut down by the government and Ilona is not paid by the dishonest owner.

During their search for employment, Lauri and Ilona have bouts of heavy drinking, all the while running into former colleagues who have similar difficulties. They think of opening a new restaurant but can't raise the money. At one point, they even sell their car and take the proceeds to a casino in hopes of increasing the money but end up losing it all. Most of their furniture and the new TV that Lauri bought is repossessed.

One day, Ilona accidentally runs into Mrs Sjöholm, her former boss. Sjöholm agrees to lend her the capital to open a restaurant. Ilona, humbled by her recent experiences, is initially reluctant to accept for fear of failing and not being able to repay Mrs Sjöholm, but eventually agrees.

Ilona names the restaurant Work and hires some of the staff from Dubrovnik, including the troubled chef, Lajunen, plus Lauri. Filled with anxiety during a slow lunch hour on opening day, Ilona's worries disappear as she watches the restaurant fill to capacity later the same afternoon. After receiving a call from a Helsinki union asking for a reservation for thirty people that evening, Lauri and Ilona stand on the front steps of the restaurant unable to express their feelings of joy, looking at the skies as more people enter.

== Cast and characters ==
- Kati Outinen - Ilona Koponen
- Kari Väänänen - Lauri Koponen
- Elina Salo - Rouva Sjöholm
- Sakari Kuosmanen - Melartin
- Markku Peltola - Lajunen
- Matti Onnismaa - Forsström
- Shelley Fisher - Pianist

== Reception ==
=== Critical response ===
Although the film was not as widely distributed as an average Hollywood feature and, as a result, was not a commercial success to the same extent, it was well received by film critics worldwide while also winning several major film awards. As of 5 February 2008, the aggregate review website Rotten Tomatoes only registered 9 reviews for the film, all of which were positive and averaged a 7.1 rating out of a possible 10. Film critic Roger Ebert awarded the film three-and-a-half stars out of 4, all the while praising Kaurismäki's "subtle irony" and challenging the widely accepted description of Kaurismäki as a minimalist by offering his opinion that the "screen is saturated with images and ideas". Damian Cannon of Movie Reviews UK awarded the film 4 stars out of 5 calling it "an examination of life and how to survive misfortune, unscrupulous characters and your own lack of foresight" and concluding that "Kaurismäki succeeds impressively".

=== Accolades ===
==== Won ====
- Cannes Film Festival
  - Prize of the Ecumenical Jury - Special Mention - Aki Kaurismäki
- Belgian Syndicate of Cinema Critics (1997)
  - Grand Prix
- Jussi Awards (1997)
  - Best Film
  - Best Actress - Kati Outinen
  - Best Direction - Aki Kaurismäki
  - Best Script - Aki Kaurismäki
  - Best Supporting Actress - Elina Salo
- São Paulo International Film Festival (1996)
  - Audience Award - Best Feature
- Tromsø International Film Festival (1997)
  - Import Award

==== Nominated ====
- Cannes Film Festival
  - Golden Palm (lost to Secrets & Lies)
- Original Music (Lonesome Traveler) - Shelley Fisher

== See also ==
- 1996 in film
- Cinema of Finland
- List of Finnish films: 1990s
- Early 1990s recession in Finland
- List of submissions to the 69th Academy Awards for Best Foreign Language Film
- List of Finnish submissions for the Academy Award for Best Foreign Language Film
