= Kati Outinen =

Finnish actress

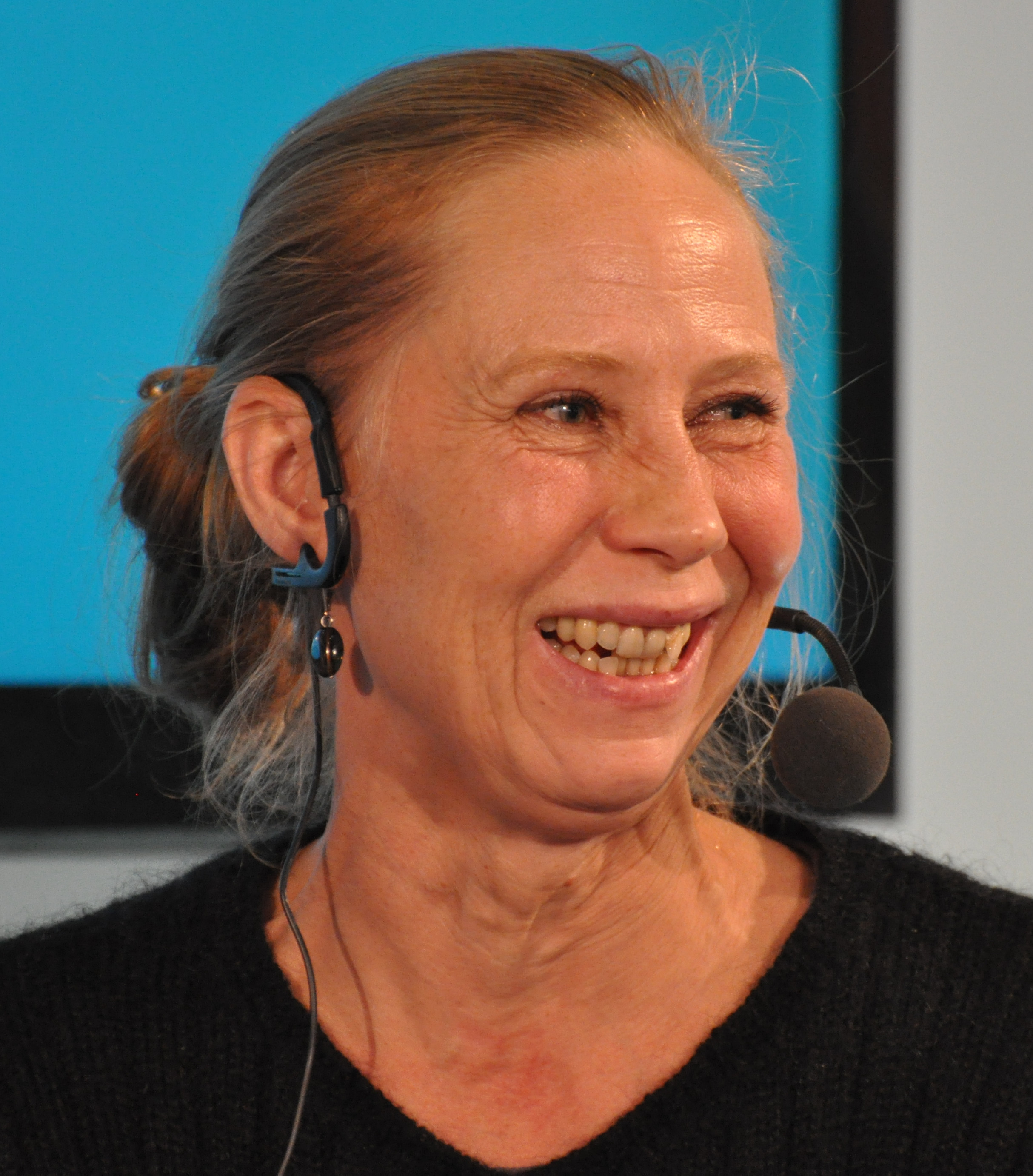
- Outinen in 2013
- Born: Anna Katriina Outinen; 17 August 1961 (age 65); Helsinki, Finland
- Occupation: Actress
- Years active: 1980–present
- Awards: Best Actress (2002 Cannes Film Festival)

Anna Katriina "Kati" Outinen (born 17 August 1961) is a Finnish actress who has often played leading roles in Aki Kaurismäki's films.

Outinen was born in Helsinki. Having studied under Jouko Turkka during his "reign" of drama studies in Finland, she nevertheless has never been associated with the "turkkalaisuus" school of acting methodology. Her breakthrough role was as a tough girl in the generational classic youth film Täältä tullaan elämä (1980) by Tapio Suominen. In 1984, she appeared in Aikalainen.

Besides a strong domestic reputation gained through a widely varied list of roles in theatre and television drama, film director Aki Kaurismäki's films have brought Outinen international attention and even adulation, particularly in Germany and France. Her first work together with Kaurismäki was Shadows in Paradise in 1986. At the 2002 Cannes Film Festival, Outinen won the award for Best Actress for the Kaurismäki film The Man Without a Past. The most recent time that Outinen and Kaurismäki worked together was in the film The Other Side of Hope (2017).

She has also contributed to the screenplay of the Finnish soap opera Salatut elämät. Outinen portrayed the central character of a Swedish bank manager in the Estonian series The Bank (2018). She has appeared as a voice actress in the animation series Babar. She has also given her voice to Ritva Tuomivaara on the video game Wolfenstein II: The New Colossus (2017).

In 2016, Outinen played with Jim Carrey in the film Dark Crimes.

Outinen worked as a professor in acting at the Theatre Academy Helsinki from 2002 to 2013.

== Partial filmography ==
- Shadows in Paradise (1986)
- Hamlet Goes Business (1987)
- The Match Factory Girl (1990)
- Take Care of Your Scarf, Tatiana (1994)
- Drifting Clouds (1996)
- Freakin' Beautiful World (1997)
- Trains'n'Roses (1998)
- Juha (1999)
- The Man Without a Past (2002)
- Avida (2006)
- Lights in the Dusk (2006)
- Sauna (2008)
- The House of Branching Love (2009)
- Le Havre (2011)
- August Fools (2013)
- Dark Crimes (2016)
- The Other Side of Hope (2017)
- Everything Outside (2018)
- The Hole in the Ground (2019)
- Defiant (2025)
