= The Man Without a Past =

2002 film

- Theatrical release poster
- Directed by: Aki Kaurismäki
- Written by: Aki Kaurismäki
- Produced by: Aki Kaurismäki
- Starring: Markku Peltola; Kati Outinen; Annikki Tähti; Juhani Niemelä; Kaija Pakarinen; Tähti-Koira; Sakari Kuosmanen; Marko Haavisto & Poutahoukat; Esko Nikkari; Outi Mäenpää; Perti Sveholm; Matti Wuori; Aino Seppo; Janne Hyytiäinen; Elina Salo; Anneli Sauli
- Cinematography: Timo Salminen
- Edited by: Timo Linnasalo
- Music by: Leevi Madetoja
- Distributed by: United International Pictures
- Release date: 1 March 2002
- Running time: 97 minutes
- Country: Finland
- Language: Finnish
- Budget: €1,206,000
- Box office: $9,564,237

The Man Without a Past (Finnish: Mies vailla menneisyyttä) is a 2002 Finnish comedy-drama film produced, written, and directed by Aki Kaurismäki. Starring Markku Peltola, Kati Outinen and Juhani Niemelä, it is the second installment in Kaurismäki's Finland trilogy, the other two films being Drifting Clouds (1996) and Lights in the Dusk (2006). The film was nominated for the Academy Award for Best Foreign Language Film in 2002 (the only Finnish film so far) and won the Grand Prix at the 2002 Cannes Film Festival.

== Plot ==
A man arrives in Helsinki at night by train and falls asleep on a park bench. There, he is assaulted by three criminals. He ends up in a coma and is declared dead at the hospital. After the doctors leave, he awakens and leaves the hospital in bandages. The Nieminen family, residing in an abandoned shipping container at the port, discover him by the sea in the morning. They take him in, nurse him back to health, but he has lost his memory, not even recalling his own name.

The marginalized residents of the harbor come to the aid of the man as he embarks on a fresh start. Anttila, a tough harbor guard involved in providing makeshift homes in empty shipping containers, arranges one for the man. Despite his efforts to find work, the man faces setbacks due to his lack of memory and inability to recall his name, leading to his rejection from the employment office. However, he meets Irma, who volunteers with the Salvation Army, who helps him secure a job at their thrift store. While working there, he convinces the Salvation Army band to incorporate rhythm music into their performances and persuades their leader to join as a vocalist. Alongside this, a romantic relationship develops between the man and Irma.

Observing welders at the shipyard triggers a recollection for the man—he realizes he is a welder by trade. He is offered a job, but to get on the shipyard's payroll, he needs to open a bank account. However, the bank refuses due to his lack of a name. Adding to his troubles, he becomes an unwitting witness to a bank robbery. Despite his attempts to explain his situation to the police, they do not believe him, and he ends up in jail. A lawyer from the Salvation Army intervenes, however, securing his release. Later, the man encounters the bank robber at a bar, who shares his motive—a grudge against the bank for bankrupting his earthmoving company and leaving his employees unpaid. Promising to deliver the stolen money to the employees, the man leaves. Afterwards, the bank robber shoots himself.

The man's identity is unveiled by the police when his wife from Nurmes recognizes him in a newspaper article about the bank robbery. Irma, shocked by this revelation, ends their relationship, leaving the man feeling dejected. He returns to Nurmes where he reunites with his wife and discovers that their marriage fell apart due to his gambling addiction. He decides to go back to his newfound life in Helsinki.

Upon his return to the harbor, he crosses paths with the three criminals who attacked him earlier. However, the harbor residents, led by Anttila, rally together to confront and defeat them. Eventually, the man and Irma reconcile, and they stroll hand in hand through the harbor, accompanied by the song "Muistatko Monrepos'n" sung by Annikki Tähti.

== Cast ==
- Markku Peltola as M
- Kati Outinen as Irma
- Juhani Niemelä as Nieminen
- Kaija Pakarinen as Kaisa Nieminen
- Sakari Kuosmanen as Anttila
- Annikki Tähti as Manager of Flea Market
- Anneli Sauli as Bar Owner
- Elina Salo as Dock Clerk
- Outi Mäenpää as Bank Clerk
- Esko Nikkari as Bank Robber
- Pertti Sveholm as Police Detective
- Matti Wuori as himself (lawyer)
- Aino Seppo as Ex-wife
- Janne Hyytiäinen as Ovaskainen
- Antti Reini as Electrician

== Production ==
The Man Without a Past was co-produced by the Finnish companies Sputnik and YLE, the German companies Bavaria Film Studios and Pandora Filmproduktion and the French company Pyramide Productions.

== Critical reception ==
The film received overwhelmingly positive reviews from critics. On Rotten Tomatoes, the film has a rating of 98%, based on 99 critics, with an average rating of 7.98/10. The site's critical consensus reads, "Kaurismäki delivers another droll comedy full of his trademark humor." On Metacritic, the film has a score of 84 out of 100, based on 29 critics, indicating "universal acclaim". Roger Ebert awarded the film three-and-a-half stars out of 4, saying he "felt a deep but indefinable contentment". Kirk Honeycutt of The Hollywood Reporter said the film "contains not one false note. It is the work of an artist fully in control of his art." Barbara Scharres of the Chicago Reader said that Kaurismäki "perfects his trademark formula of deadpan humor and arctic circle pathos in this brilliantly ironic 2002 comedy."

== Awards and nominations ==
List of awards and nominations
| Award | Year | Category | Recipient | Result | Ref. |
|---|---|---|---|---|---|
| ACCEC Awards | 2002 | Best Foreign Film | Aki Kaurismäki | Won | |
| Academy Awards | 2002 | Best Foreign Language Film | | Nominated | |
| Argentinean Film Critics Association Awards | 2002 | Best Foreign Film | | Nominated | |
| Bangkok International Film Festival | 2003 | Best Actress | Kati Outinen | Won | |
| Bangkok International Film Festival | 2003 | Best Screenplay | Aki Kaurismäki | Won | |
| Bangkok International Film Festival | 2003 | Best Film | Aki Kaurismäki | Nominated | |
| Bodil Awards | 2002 | Best Non-American Film | Aki Kaurismäki | Nominated | |
| Camerimage | 2002 | Golden Frog | Timo Salminen | Nominated | |
| Cannes Film Festival | 2002 | Best Actress | Kati Outinen | Won | |
| Cannes Film Festival | 2002 | Grand Prize of the Jury | Aki Kaurismäki | Won | |
| Cannes Film Festival | 2002 | Prize of the Ecumenical Jury | Aki Kaurismäki | Won | |
| Cannes Film Festival | 2002 | Golden Palm | Aki Kaurismäki | Nominated | |
| Cannes Film Festival | 2002 | Palm Dog | Tähti | Won | |
| Chicago Film Critics Association Awards | 2002 | Best Foreign Language Film | | Nominated | |
| César Awards | 2002 | Best European Union Film | | Nominated | |
| European Film Awards | 2002 | Audience Award - Best Director | Aki Kaurismäki | Nominated | |
| European Film Awards | 2002 | Best Actor | Markku Peltola | Nominated | |
| European Film Awards | 2002 | Best Actress | Kati Outinen | Nominated | |
| European Film Awards | 2002 | Best Cinematographer | Timo Salminen | Nominated | |
| European Film Awards | 2002 | Best Director | Aki Kaurismäki | Nominated | |
| European Film Awards | 2002 | Best Film | Aki Kaurismäki | Nominated | |
| European Film Awards | 2002 | Best Screenwriter | Aki Kaurismäki | Nominated | |
| Fajr Film Festival | 2002 | International Competition - Best Screenplay | Aki Kaurismäki | Won | |
| Film Critics Circle of Australia Awards | 2002 | Best Foreign-Language Film | | Nominated | |
| Film Fest Gent | 2002 | Grand Prix | Aki Kaurismäki | Won | |
| Guldbagge Awards | 2002 | Best Foreign Film | | Won | |
| Italian National Syndicate of Film Journalists | 2002 | Best Director - Foreign Film | Aki Kaurismäki | Nominated | |
| Jussi Awards | 2002 | Best Film | | Won | |
| Jussi Awards | 2002 | Best Actress | Kati Outinen | Won | |
| Jussi Awards | 2002 | Best Cinematography | Timo Salminen | Won | |
| Jussi Awards | 2002 | Best Direction | Aki Kaurismäki | Won | |
| Jussi Awards | 2002 | Best Editing | Timo Linnasalo | Won | |
| Jussi Awards | 2002 | Best Script | Aki Kaurismäki | Won | |
| Jussi Awards | 2002 | Best Actor | Markku Peltola | Nominated | |
| Lübeck Nordic Film Days | 2002 | Audience Prize | Aki Kaurismäki | Won | |
| National Society of Film Critics Awards | 2002 | Best Foreign Language Film | | Won | |
| Nordic Council | 2002 | Nordic Council's Film Prize | Aki Kaurismäki | Won | |
| Palm Springs International Film Festival | 2002 | FIPRESCI Prize | Aki Kaurismäki | Won | |
| Robert Festival | 2002 | Best Non-American Film | Aki Kaurismäki | Nominated | |
| San Sebastián International Film Festival | 2002 | FIPRESCI Film of the Year | Aki Kaurismäki | Won | |
