= International Federation of Film Critics =

Association of national organizations of professional film critics

- Fédération Internationale de la Presse Cinématographique
- Abbreviation: FIPRESCI
- Formation: 6 June 1930
- Founded at: Academy Palace; Brussels; Belgium
- Type: Film critics organization
- Headquarters: Munich, Germany
- Official language: English, French
- President: Ahmed Shawky
- Vice-Presidents: Paola Casella, Elena Rubashevska
- General Secretary: Klaus Eder
- Deputy General Secretary: Alin Tasciyan
- Website: www.fipresci.org

The International Federation of Film Critics (FIPRESCI, short for Fédération Internationale de la Presse Cinématographique) is an association of national organizations of professional film critics and film journalists from around the world for "the promotion and development of film culture and for the safeguarding of professional interests." It was founded in June 1930 in Brussels, Belgium. It has members in more than 50 countries worldwide.

== History ==
In reaction to the 2022 Russian invasion of Ukraine, FIPRESCI announced that it will not participate in festivals and other events organized by the Russian government and its offices, and canceled a colloquium in St. Petersburg, that was to make it familiar with new Russian films.

== FIPRESCI Award ==
The FIPRESCI often presents awards during film festivals to recognize examples of enterprising filmmaking. Some of these festivals include: the Berlin International Film Festival, the Cannes Film Festival, Vienna International Film Festival, the Toronto International Film Festival, the Venice Film Festival, the Warsaw Film Festival, and the International Film Festival of Kerala.

Winners of the award include:

- Abbas Kiarostami
- Abderrahmane Sissako
- Aditya Kripalani
- Adoor Gopalakrishnan
- Aki Kaurismäki
- Akira Kurosawa
- Antoni Krauze
- Andrei Tarkovsky
- Andrzej Wajda
- Arun Karthick
- Bahman Ghobadi
- Béla Tarr
- Bertrand Bonello
- Bruno Jori
- Chaitanya Tamhane
- Claire Denis
- Cristian Mungiu
- Danis Tanović
- Djibril Diop Mambety
- Harris Dickinson
- Ingmar Bergman
- Jafar Panahi
- Jean-Luc Godard
- Jonathan Glazer
- Julia Ducournau
- Ken Loach
- Kim Ki-duk
- Kleber Mendonça Filho
- Laurent Cantet
- Lee Chang-dong
- Makbul Mubarak
- Manoel de Oliveira
- Marco Ferreri
- Michael Haneke
- Michael Moore
- Neeraj Ghaywan
- Nobuhiko Obayashi
- Nuri Bilge Ceylan
- Orson Welles
- Paul Thomas Anderson
- Park Chan-wook
- Pedro Almodóvar
- Prateek Vats
- Rainer Werner Fassbinder
- Robert Eggers
- Roman Polanski
- Satyajit Ray
- Shaji N Karun
- Srđan Karanović
- Terrence Malick
- Theodoros Angelopoulos
- Uisenma Borchu
- Yılmaz Güney
- Şerif Gören
- Yôko Yamanaka
- Werner Herzog
- Wong Kar-wai
- Woody Allen
- Wuershan

Robert Bresson refused this award at the 1974 Cannes Film Festival.

== FIPRESCI Grand Prix ==
The FIPRESCI Grand Prix was created in 1999, and is presented every year at the San Sebastián Film Festival. It is the federation's most representative acknowledgement, as it is not chosen by a jury (like the international critics prize awarded to a film from a festival program), but is elected by all members, and all feature-length productions of the previous twelve months are eligible.

Winners include:

- 1999 – All About My Mother, Pedro Almodóvar
- 2000 – Magnolia, Paul Thomas Anderson
- 2001 – The Circle, Jafar Panahi
- 2002 – The Man Without a Past, Aki Kaurismäki
- 2003 – Uzak, Nuri Bilge Ceylan
- 2004 – Notre musique, Jean-Luc Godard
- 2005 – 3-Iron, Kim Ki-duk
- 2006 – Volver, Pedro Almodóvar
- 2007 – 4 Months, 3 Weeks and 2 Days, Cristian Mungiu
- 2008 – There Will Be Blood, Paul Thomas Anderson
- 2009 – The White Ribbon, Michael Haneke
- 2010 – The Ghost Writer, Roman Polanski
- 2011 – The Tree of Life, Terrence Malick
- 2012 – Amour, Michael Haneke
- 2013 – Blue Is the Warmest Colour Abdellatif Kechiche
- 2014 – Boyhood, Richard Linklater
- 2015 – Mad Max: Fury Road, George Miller
- 2016 – Toni Erdmann, Maren Ade
- 2017 – The Other Side of Hope, Aki Kaurismäki
- 2018 – Phantom Thread, Paul Thomas Anderson
- 2019 – Roma, Alfonso Cuarón
- 2020 – Not awarded
- 2021 – Nomadland, Chloé Zhao
- 2022 – Drive My Car, Ryusuke Hamaguchi
- 2023 – Fallen Leaves, Aki Kaurismäki
- 2024 – Poor Things, Yorgos Lanthimos
- 2025 - I'm Still Here, Walter Salles
- 2026 - One Battle After Another, Paul Thomas Anderson

== Journal ==
As of 2005, it also offers an online cinema journal, Undercurrents, edited by film critic Chris Fujiwara.
