= Lights in the Dusk =

- DVD cover
- Directed by: Aki Kaurismäki
- Written by: Aki Kaurismäki
- Produced by: Aki Kaurismäki
- Starring: Janne Hyytiäinen; Ilkka Koivula; Maria Järvenhelmi; Maria Heiskanen
- Cinematography: Timo Salminen
- Edited by: Aki Kaurismäki
- Production company: Sputnik
- Distributed by: Sandrew Metronome
- Release dates: 3 February 2006 (Finland); 22 April 2006 (Cannes); 8 November 2006 (Internationales Filmfest Braunschweig)
- Running time: 78 minutes
- Countries: Finland; Germany; France
- Language: Finnish
- Budget: € 1,380,000
- Box office: $1,615,018

Lights in the Dusk (Finnish: Laitakaupungin valot) is a 2006 Finnish comedy-drama film written, directed, produced and edited by Aki Kaurismäki. Starring Janne Hyytiäinen, Ilkka Koivula, and Maria Järvenhelmi, the film was presented at the 2006 Cannes Film Festival. It is the last installment in Kaurismäki's "Finland" trilogy after Drifting Clouds (1996) and The Man Without a Past (2002).

The film is about a security guard who is set up in a robbery by a femme fatale who exploits his gullibility and loyalty. Classical music is used as background throughout much of the film, including excerpts from the work of the famous Swedish tenor Jussi Björling.

It has been argued that the film deals with the ways in which "[c]apitalism has painted the town red, just a different shade of red from its socialist connotations," as well as that "rock is so important to the director that a number of his males, including Koistinen, favor a 50s, greasy, sweptback hair style, to go along with their love of rock 'n' roll (definitely a reminder of how rock was the way to rebel in socialist countries)."

== Plot ==
Koistinen is a lonely nightwatchman tasked with guarding a shopping mall. He attempts to socialize, but is treated coldly by his manager and subjected to mocking by his colleagues. While drinking alone in a bar, he catches the eye of some criminals headed by Lindholm who learn of his occupation. Koistinen's only human contact is the grill vendor Aila to whom he outlines his plans of starting his own company.

While at work, Koistinen notices a dog left outside a pub without water. While he is taking a break, Mirja approaches him, saying he seems lonely. They agree to go on a date together. Returning from his break, Koistinen meets a young boy in front of the pub and asks if he knows the owners of the dog. Despite the boy's warning, Koistinen confronts the owners in the pub and is beaten.

Koistinen and Mirja go on a date. They talk little, and at a concert Koistinen watches as Mirja goes dancing on her own with other men. Despite this, they agree to meet again. Koistinen returns to Aila's grill and talks about his evening. Insulted, Aila asks him to leave and closes shop. Meanwhile, Mirja meets with Lindholm for her payment and ridicules Koistinen. Lindholm informs his contacts of an "open-door day."

Koistinen seeks a loan to start his own business, but is harshly refused at the bank due to his insufficient education and lack of guarantors. Later, Mirja unexpectedly joins Koistinen while he is taking his rounds. While Koistinen explains the mall's security system, Mirja memorizes the security code he uses. She gives the code to Lindholm, who tells her to start cooling the fake relationship off.

Mirja meets Koistinen at his place, but abruptly leaves when he attempts to put his arm around her. Koistinen begins to drink heavily, and ends up at Aila's grill. Aila walks him home and puts him to bed.

At work, one of Koistinen's colleagues mockingly asks about his successes with women. Koistinen grabs the man, but stops himself from striking him and goes to his rounds. Mirja meets him and asks him to come and talk. Koistinen signs off and leaves with Mirja in his car. Mirja drugs Koistinen and passes his keys to one of Lindholm's contacts. Using Koistinen's keys and security code, the thieves rob a jewellery store at the mall.

The police question Koistinen, but he claims to have been alone and drunk. He is released due to lack of proof, but is fired from his job. On Lindholm's insistence, Mirja meets with Koistinen at his apartment once again to plant evidence. Koistinen notices her hiding the evidence, but does not stop her and lets himself be arrested by the police. He is sentenced to two years in prison.

Koistinen initially remains lonely in prison, tearing up a letter Aila sends him. Just as Koistinen begins to have some contact to other inmates, he is released a year early on parole. He finds lodgings at a night shelter and gets a job as a restaurant's dishwasher. He runs into Aila, but soon excuses himself. However, Aila comes to see him at the night shelter and asks about his plans for the future. When Koistinen says he plans to open a garage once he's back on his feet, she congratulates him for not losing hope. They agree to see each other again.

Koistinen sees Mirja and Lindholm at the restaurant where he is working, but does not confront them. Lindholm calls up the head waitress and tells about Koistinen's criminal record, which results in him being fired immediately. Koistinen gets a knife from the night shelter and returns to the restaurant. As Lindholm and Mirja are leaving, he attacks Lindholm, but only manages to cut his hand while being disarmed and subdued by Lindholm's thugs. The thugs offer to kill Koistinen, but Lindholm refuses, saying he is a businessman and not a murderer. The young boy who warned Koistinen earlier sees the thugs take him away and finds Aila. They discover the badly beaten Koistinen in the harbour, along with the dog Koistinen attempted to help earlier. Aila offers to get help but Koistinen asks her to stay. When she asks him not to die, Koistinen replies "I won't die yet" and puts his hand on hers.

== Cast ==
- Janne Hyytiäinen as Koistinen
- Maria Järvenhelmi as Mirja
- Maria Heiskanen as Aila
- Ilkka Koivula as Lindholm
- Sergei Doudko as Russian
- Andrei Gennadiev as Russian
- Arturas Pozdniakovas as Russian
- Matti Onnismaa as Shift Manager
- Sulevi Peltola as Foreman
- Kati Outinen as Cashier

== Production ==
The film was chosen as Finland's nominee for the 79th Academy Awards in the category of Best Foreign Language Film. However, Kaurismäki decided to boycott the awards and refused the nomination as a protest against US President George W. Bush's foreign policy. Kaurismäki also boycotted the 2002 gala, when his previous film The Man Without a Past (2002) was nominated for an Oscar.

== Critical response ==
Lights in the Dusk received mixed-to-positive reviews from critics. On Rotten Tomatoes, the film has a rating of 71%, based on 41 critics, with an average rating of 6.5/10. The site's critical consensus reads, "From its brilliant cinematography to its compassionate characters, Lights in the Dusk is another successful exercise in deadpan minimalist comedy from Aki Kaurismäki." On Metacritic, the film has a score of 57 out of 100, based on 12 critics, indicating "mixed or average reviews".
