= Aki Kaurismäki =

Finnish film director

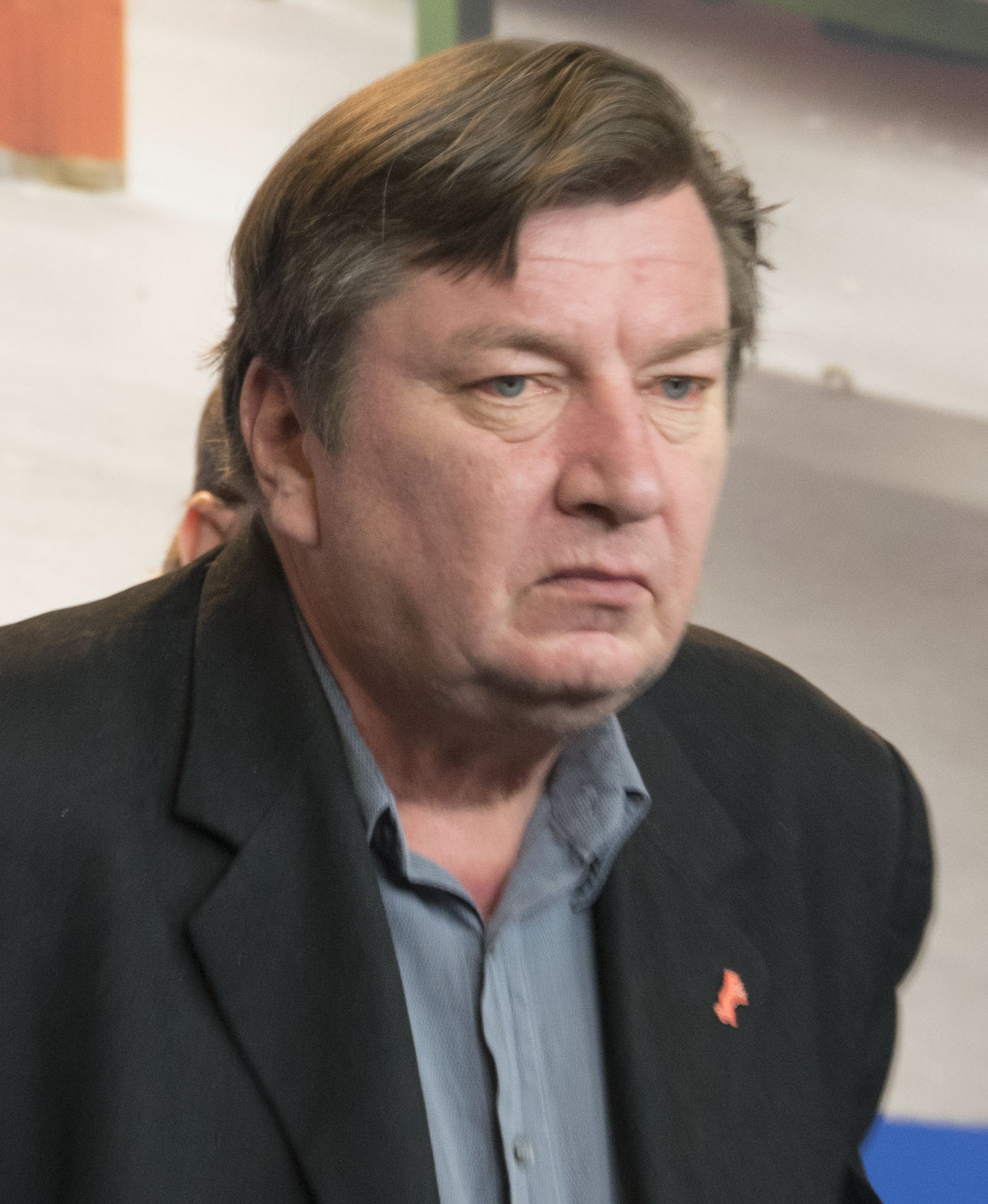
- Kaurismäki in February 2017
- Born: 4 April 1957 (age 69); Orimattila, Finland
- Occupation: Filmmaker
- Spouse: Paula Oinonen
- Relatives: Mika Kaurismäki (brother)

Aki Olavi Kaurismäki (Finnish pronunciation: [ˈɑki ˈo̞lɑʋi ˈkɑu̯rismæki]; born 4 April 1957) is a Finnish filmmaker. He is best known for films such as Leningrad Cowboys Go America (1989), Drifting Clouds (1996), The Man Without a Past (2002), Le Havre (2011), The Other Side of Hope (2017), and Fallen Leaves (2023).

== Early life ==
Aki Olavi Kaurismäki was born in Orimattila on 4 April 1957. His older brother, Mika, is also a filmmaker. He grew up in Karkkila and graduated with a degree in media studies from the University of Tampere, but did not pursue a career in film immediately; he instead went to work as a bricklayer, dish washer, and postman. His first foray into the film world was as a critic.

== Career ==
Kaurismäki started his career as a co-writer and actor in films made by his brother Mika. He played the main role in Mika's film The Liar (1981). They co-founded the production company Villealfa Filmproductions and the Midnight Sun Film Festival.

Kaurismäki's directorial debut was Crime and Punishment (1983), an adaptation of the Dostoyevsky novel set in modern Helsinki. He gained worldwide attention with Leningrad Cowboys Go America (1989). In 1992, New York Times film critic Vincent Canby declared him "an original, one of cinema's most distinctive and idiosyncratic new artists, and possibly one of the most serious" and said he "could well turn out to be the seminal European filmmaker of the '90s". He has since gone to make films such as Leningrad Cowboys Go America (1989), Drifting Clouds (1996), The Man Without a Past (2002), Le Havre (2011), The Other Side of Hope (2017), and Fallen Leaves (2023). He has been described as Finland's most famous film director.

== Style ==
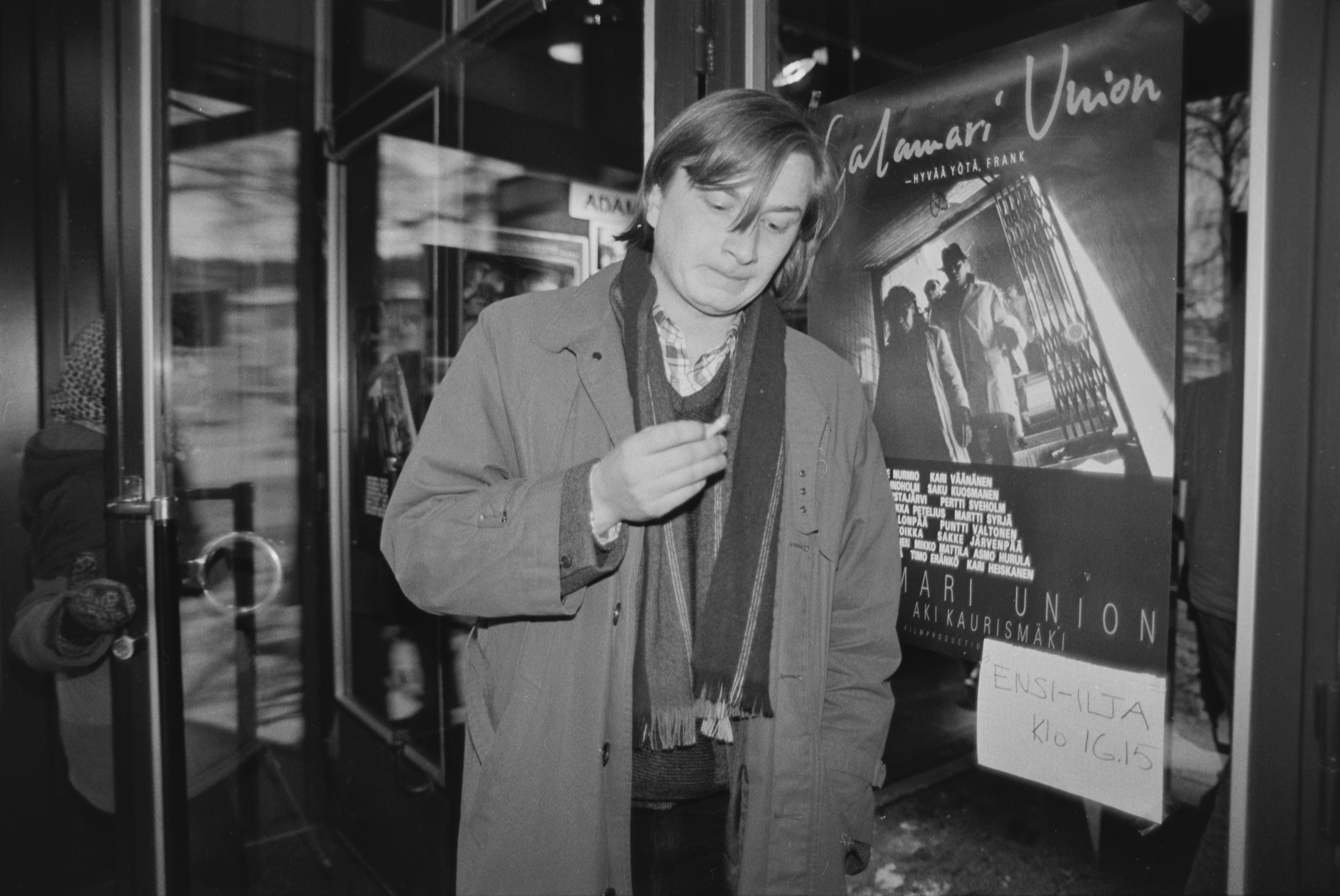
Kaurismäki in 1985

Kaurismäki is known for his minimalistic style. He has been called an auteur as he usually writes, produces, and edits the films he has directed and thus introduces his personal "droll, deadpan" style.

In Kaurismäki's films, the camera is often still. Events are shown in a plain manner and characters are usually left alone facing the consequences. However, despite their tragedies and setbacks, they do not give up and eventually survive.

Much of Kaurismäki's work takes place in Helsinki, of which his view is critical and completely unromantic, with his characters often speaking about how they wish to leave the city. He also uses characters, elements, and settings that evoke the 1960s and 1970s.

== Views and opinions ==
=== Digital filmmaking ===
Kaurismäki has been a vocal critic of digital cinematography. In 2012, he said he would never "make a digital film in this life". In 2014, he called it "a devil's invention which destroys human culture as we know it, robs us of our jobs and makes us in the long run slaves". He softened his position later that year, stating, "In order to keep my humble film oeuvre accessible to a potential audience, I have ended up rendering [my work] to digital in all its present and several of its as-yet-unknown forms." However, he maintained that he would opt for traditional 35 mm film "as long as it is possible regarding access to stock and [the] existence of laboratories".

=== Politics ===
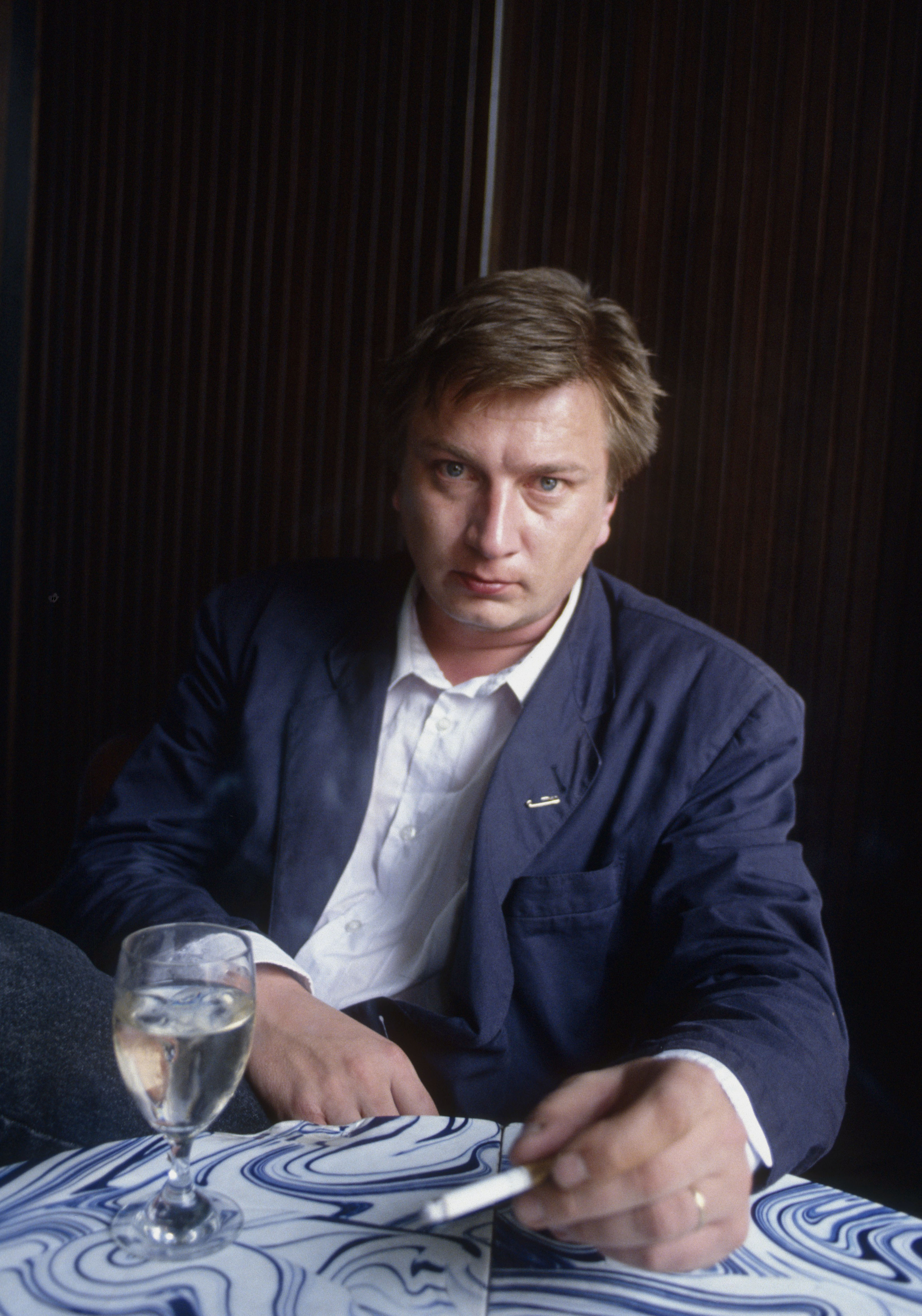
Kaurismäki in 1990

The political context of Kaurismäki's work is highly influenced by his attitude to Finland's treatment of the working class. In his view, the social and political ramifications of class structures and lack of economic parity render lower-class workers replaceable cogs in an outdated machine.

Kaurismäki has criticised Finland's strict immigration policy. When Iraqi refugees arrived in Finland, he said many people in the country "perceived that as an attack, like a war". He was alarmed by their reaction and decided to make a film, The Other Side of Hope, in an effort to "change the Finns' attitude". He later said of German chancellor Angela Merkel's open-door refugee policy, "I respect Mrs. Merkel. She is the only politician who seems to be at least interested in the problem." In a 2007 interview with film scholar Andrew Nestingen, he said, "The real disgrace here is Finland's refugee policy, which is shameful. We refuse refugee status on the flimsiest of grounds and send people back to 'secure' places like Darfur, Iraq, and Somalia. [We say] 'It's perfectly safe, go ahead.' Our policy is a stain among the Nordic nations. Shameful."

In December 2019, along with 42 other leading cultural figures, Kaurismäki signed an open letter endorsing the British Labour Party under Jeremy Corbyn's leadership in the 2019 general election. The letter stated that "Labour's election manifesto under Jeremy Corbyn's leadership offers a transformative plan that prioritises the needs of people and the planet over private profit and the vested interests of a few".

In May 2023, Kaurismäki spoke out against the potential entry of Finland into NATO.

In December 2023, in the midst of the Israeli invasion of the Gaza Strip, Kaurismäki joined over 50 filmmakers in signing an open letter published in Libération. The letter demanded a ceasefire, an end to the killing of civilians, the establishment of a corridor into Gaza for humanitarian aid, and the release of hostages. In May 2025, Kaurismäki and over 350 other film industry figures signed an open letter criticizing the industry's passivity about the war in Gaza. Four months later, he joined numerous others in signing an open agreement with Film Workers for Palestine, pledging not to work with Israeli film institutions "that are implicated in genocide and apartheid against the Palestinian people".

== Personal life ==
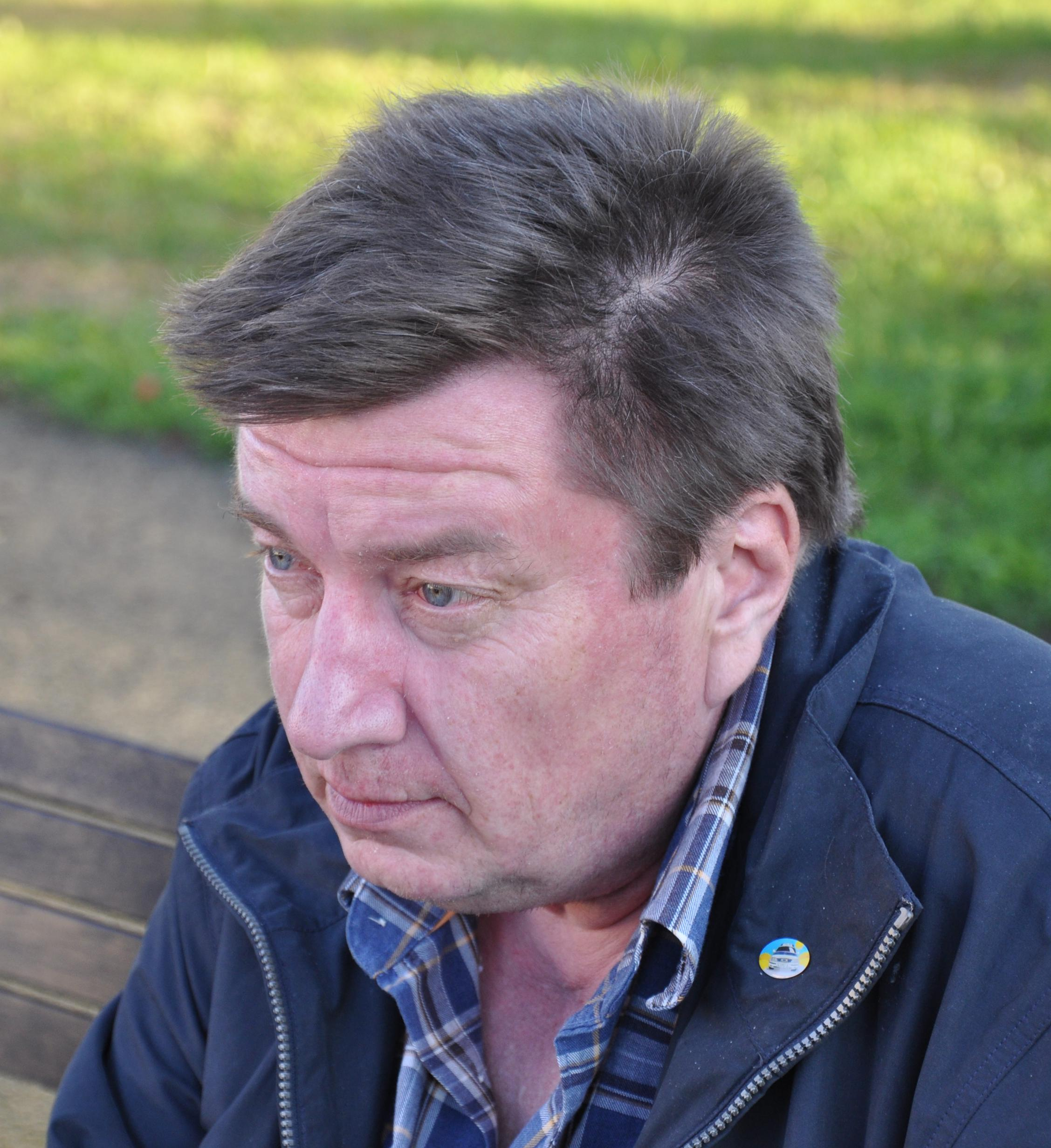
Kaurismäki in 2012

Kaurismäki and his wife Paula Oinonen have lived in Lisbon since 1989. He said they moved to Portugal because "in all of Helsinki there is no place left where [he] could place [his] camera", though he has since continued to set his films in Helsinki. His brother Mika also moved to Portugal with his Brazilian wife in the mid-2010s after nearly 30 years in Brazil, but they returned to Finland in 2019.

Kaurismäki co-owns a complex in Helsinki called Andorra, which features a cinema, several bars, and a pool hall with a giant poster of Robert Bresson's L'Argent and the jukebox from Leningrad Cowboys Meet Moses. In 2021, he opened a cinema called Kino Laika in his hometown of Karkkila, which was the subject of the documentary Cinéma Laika by Croatian-French director Veljko Vidak.

== Filmography ==
=== Feature films ===
Year	Title	Director	Writer	Producer	Editor	Notes
1983	The Worthless	No	Yes	No	No	
1983	Crime and Punishment	Yes	Yes	No	No	
1984	The Clan - Tale of the Frogs	No	Yes	No	No	
1985	Calamari Union	Yes	Yes	Yes	Yes	Also composer
1985	Rosso	No	Yes	No	No	
1986	Shadows in Paradise	Yes	Yes	No	No	
1987	The Final Arrangement	No	Yes	Yes	No	
1987	Hamlet Goes Business	Yes	Yes	Yes	No	
1988	Ariel	Yes	Yes	Yes	No	
1989	Dirty Hands	Yes	Yes	No	No	TV film
1989	Leningrad Cowboys Go America	Yes	Yes	Yes	No	
1990	The Match Factory Girl	Yes	Yes	Yes	Yes	
1990	I Hired a Contract Killer	Yes	Yes	Yes	Yes	
1992	La Vie de Bohème	Yes	Yes	Yes	Yes	
1994	Take Care of Your Scarf, Tatiana	Yes	Yes	Yes	Yes	
1994	Leningrad Cowboys Meet Moses	Yes	Yes	Yes	Yes	
1996	Drifting Clouds	Yes	Yes	Yes	Yes	
1999	Juha	Yes	Yes	Yes	Yes	
2002	The Man Without a Past	Yes	Yes	Yes	No	
2006	Lights in the Dusk	Yes	Yes	Yes	Yes	
2011	Le Havre	Yes	Yes	Yes	No	
2017	The Other Side of Hope	Yes	Yes	Yes	No	
2023	Fallen Leaves	Yes	Yes	Yes	No	

=== Documentaries ===
Year	Title	Director	Writer	Producer	Notes
1981	The Saimaa Gesture	Yes	Uncredited	Uncredited	Co-directed with Mika Kaurismäki
1994	Total Balalaika Show	Yes	Yes	Yes	
2013	Juice Leskinen & Grand Slam: Bluesia Pieksämäen asemalla	Yes	Concept	Yes	Documentary short film

=== Short films ===
Year	Title	Director	Writer	Producer	Editor	Notes
1981	The Liar	No	Yes	No	No	Medium-length film
1982	The Liar 2	No	Yes	No	No	Medium-length film
1986	Rocky VI	Yes	Yes	Yes	Yes	
1992	Shit Happens	No	No	Yes	Yes	
1996	Employment Agent	Yes	Yes	Yes	Yes	
2002	Dogs Have No Hell	Yes	Yes	Yes	Yes	Included in the anthology film Ten Minutes Older - The Trumpet
2004	Bico	Yes	Yes	Yes	Yes	Included in the anthology film Visions of Europe
2006	The Foundry	Yes	Yes	Yes	Yes	Included in the anthology film To Each His Own Cinema
2012	Tavern Man	Yes	Yes	Yes	Yes	Included in the anthology film Centro Histórico

=== Music videos ===
Year	Title	Director	Writer	Producer	Editor
1987	"Thru the Wire"	Yes	Yes	Yes	Yes
1987	"Rich Little Bitch"	Yes	Yes	Yes	No
1987	"L.A. Woman"	Yes	Yes	Yes	No
1992	"Those Were the Days"	Yes	Yes	Yes	Yes
1993	"These Boots"	Yes	Yes	Yes	Yes
1996	"Always Be a Human"	Yes	No	No	No

=== As actor ===
- The Liar (1981)
- The Worthless (1982)
- Huhtikuu on kuukausista julmin (1983)
- Apinan vuosi (1983)
- Viimeiset rotanrahat (1985)
- Calamari Union (1985)
- Ylösnousemus (1985)
- Shadows in Paradise (1986)
- Rocky VI (1986)
- I Hired a Contract Killer (1990)
- Shit Happens (1992)
- Leningrad Cowboys Meet Moses (1994)
- Iron Horsemen (1994)
- Mustasilmä-Susanna ja lepakkoluolan aarre (1996)
- Aaltra (2004)
- Vandaleyne (2015)

== Awards and protests ==
Kaurismäki's film Ariel (1988) was entered into the 16th Moscow International Film Festival where it won the Prix FIPRESCI.

Kaurismäki's most acclaimed film has been The Man Without a Past, which won the Grand Prix and the Prize of the Ecumenical Jury at the 2002 Cannes Film Festival and was nominated for an Academy Award in the Best Foreign Language Film category in 2003. However, Kaurismäki refused to attend the Oscar ceremony, asserting that he did not feel like partying in a country that was in a state of war. Kaurismäki's next film Lights in the Dusk was also chosen to be Finland's nominee for best foreign-language film, but Kaurismäki again boycotted the awards and refused the nomination, as a protest against U.S. President George W. Bush's foreign policy. In 2002 Kaurismäki also boycotted the 40th New York Film Festival in a show of solidarity with the Iranian director Abbas Kiarostami, who was not given a US visa in time for the festival.

Kaurismäki's 2017 film The Other Side of Hope won the Silver Bear for Best Director award at the 67th Berlin International Film Festival. At the same festival he also announced that it would be his last film as a director, although the retirement was short-lived as he began filming another film, Fallen Leaves, which premiered at the 2023 Cannes Film Festival. Kaurismäki became the second director, after Paul Thomas Anderson, to win his third FIPRESCI Grand Prix.

=== List of awards ===
Cannes Jury Prize
2023 Fallen Leaves
Silver Bear
2017 The Other Side of Hope
Cannes Grand Prix
2002 The Man Without a Past
Cannes Ecumenical Jury Special Mention
1996 Drifting Clouds
Cannes Prize of the Ecumenical Jury
2002 The Man Without a Past
FIPRESCI Award
2011 Le Havre
FIPRESCI Grand Prix
2002 The Man Without a Past
2017 The Other Side of Hope
2023 Fallen Leaves
Jussi for Best Film
2006 Lights in the Dusk
Jussi for Best Debut Film
1983 Crime and Punishment
Jussi for Best Script
1983 Crime and Punishment
1996 Drifting Clouds
2002 The Man Without a Past
2011 Le Havre
Jussi for Best Direction
1990 The Match Factory Girl
1992 La vie de bohème
1996 Drifting Clouds
2002 The Man Without a Past
São Paulo Audience Award for Best Feature
1996 Drifting Clouds

== See also ==
- Finnish cinema
- List of Finnish submissions for the Academy Award for Best Foreign Language Film
- List of Nordic Academy Award winners and nominees
- Klaus Härö

== Sources ==
- Roger Connah K/K: A Couple of Finns and Some Donald Ducks: Cinema and Society. VAPK Pub., Helsinki, 1991
- Ródenas, Gabri (2008), "The Poetry of Silence", Orimattila Town Library.
- Pilar Carrera: "El cineasta que vino del frío (Bico-Visión)" ("The moviemaker who came in from the cold"):
- Vidak, Veljko (2023). Cinéma Laika. https://arenan.yle.fi/1-68321915
