= Finnkino =

Finnish film distributor and theater chain

Finnkino Oy
- Logo used since 2022
- Type: Subsidiary
- Industry: Cinema
- Founded: 1986; 40 years ago
- Headquarters: Helsinki, Finland
- Area served: Finland
- Owner: AMC Theatres
- Parent: Nordic Cinema Group
- Website: finnkino.fi

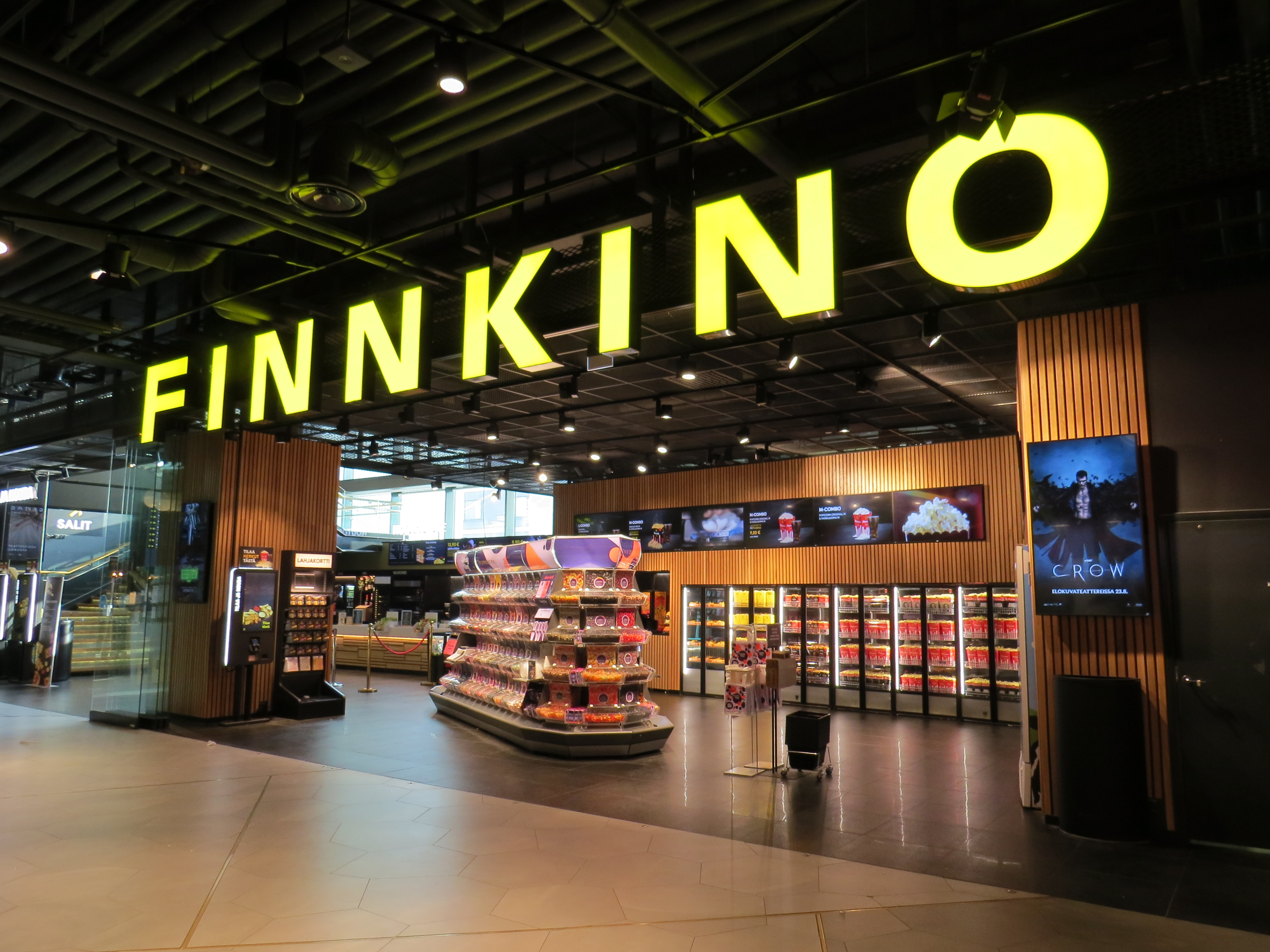
Finnkino at Iso Omena

Finnkino Oy is a Finnish film distributor, producer, and movie theater chain. It was established in 1986 as a union of 34 companies working in the film industry. In 1994, Finnkino was acquired by the Rautakirja Group, which became a division of the Sanoma Group in 1999. Finnkino operates a total of 16 cinemas in eleven cities. It also has subsidiaries in Latvia, Lithuania, and Estonia, operated under the names of Forum Cinemas and Forum Distribution. In early 2017, Finnkino and other Scandinavian and Baltic cinema chains were acquired by AMC Theatres as part of its acquisition of Nordic Cinema Group.

Finnkino's biggest movie theatre multiplex is Tennispalatsi in Helsinki, and its headquarters are located in Ruskeasuo, Helsinki.

In 2006, Finnkino took over Finnish theatrical distribution for films by United International Pictures' partner studios, Paramount Pictures (including films by DreamWorks) and Universal Pictures, after UIP decided to move its Finnish distribution base from Buena Vista International for several years.

== Theatres ==
As of 2025, Finnkino runs seventeen multiplex movie theaters in twelve Finnish cities:

The theaters of Finnkino
City	Name	Number of screens	Other
Espoo	Omena	7	Is located in the shopping centre "Iso Omena" (Big Apple), also contains an "ISENSE" auditorium
Espoo	Sello	6	Is located in the shopping centre that also bears the name "Sello"
Helsinki	Kinopalatsi	10	
Helsinki	Tennispalatsi	14	Contains an "ISENSE" auditorium
Helsinki	Itis	7	Contains Finland's only IMAX screen, is located in the shopping centre that also bears the name "Itis"
Helsinki	Maxim	2	Finland's oldest still operating movie theater
Jyväskylä	Fantasia	6	
Kuopio	Scala	7	
Lahti	Kuvapalatsi	6	
Lappeenranta	Strand	4	
Oulu	Plaza	8	
Pori	Promenadikeskus	5	
Raisio	Luxe Mylly Raisio	6	The first "LUXE" cinema in the Nordic countries, inside Raisio's Mylly shopping centre. The theatre has only premium screens.
Tampere	Cine Atlas	4	
Tampere	Plevna	10	
Turku	Kinopalatsi	9	Contains an "ISENSE" auditorium
Vantaa	Flamingo	6	Is located in the shopping centre that bears the same name
