= Tove (film) =

2020 biographical film about Tove Jansson

- Film poster
- Directed by: Zaida Bergroth
- Screenplay by: Eeva Putro
- Story by: Eeva Putro; Jarno Elonen
- Produced by: Aleksi Bardy; Andrea Reuter
- Starring: Alma Pöysti; Krista Kosonen; Shanti Roney; Joanna Haartti
- Cinematography: Linda Wassberg
- Edited by: Samu Heikkilä
- Music by: Matti Bye
- Release date: 2 October 2020
- Running time: 103 minutes
- Countries: Finland; Sweden
- Languages: Swedish; English; Finnish; French
- Budget: €3.4 million

Tove [ˈtuːve] is a 2020 Finnish biographical film about Swedish-speaking Finnish author and illustrator Tove Jansson, creator of the Moomins. The film was directed by Zaida Bergroth from a script by Eeva Putro, and stars Alma Pöysti in the title role.

The film's budget, at €3.4 million, made it the second most expensive Finnish film, following the 2017 version of The Unknown Soldier. Tove was released to critical acclaim, and was selected as the Finnish entry for the Best International Feature Film award at the 93rd Academy Awards, but was not nominated.

== Plot ==
The film follows the early life of Tove Jansson from the end of World War II to the mid-1950s, showing her romantic relationships with the politician Atos Wirtanen and the theatre director Vivica Bandler, as well as the creation and publication of the Moomins.

== Cast ==
- Alma Pöysti as Tove Jansson
- Krista Kosonen as Vivica Bandler
- Shanti Roney as Atos Wirtanen
- Joanna Haartti as Tuulikki Pietilä
- Eeva Putro as Maya Vanni
- Jakob Öhrman as Sam Vanni
- Robert Enckell as Viktor 'Faffan' Jansson
- Kajsa Ernst as Signe 'Ham' Jansson
- Wilhelm Enckell as Lars Jansson

== Release ==
Tove screened at the Toronto International Film Festival in September 2020. The film was released in Finland on 2 October 2020, and in the UK on 9 July 2021.

=== Reception ===
Tove was positively received by critics; Pöysti's title role in particular garnered critical acclaim. Variety described Pöysti's performance as "mesmerizing", stating she "excels in her first leading film role and strongly resembles the real Tove". They were also positive about Bergroth's direction, commenting that she "flexes her considerable cinematic powers, conjuring vibrantly expressive visuals and confident performances from her talented cast."

Cath Clarke, reviewing the film in The Guardian, called Pöysti's performance "quietly blazing and passionate", writing that "the focus on Jansson’s interior world gives this film moments that really come to life", and praising the film for including Jansson's doubtful feelings about her Moomins.

=== Accolades ===
Tove won seven Jussi Awards, including Best Film and Best Actress for Pöysti. This was the most awards won by a Finland-Swedish film.

== See also ==
- List of submissions to the 93rd Academy Awards for Best International Feature Film
- List of Finnish submissions for the Academy Award for Best International Feature Film
- Comet in Moominland (film)
- The Summer Book (film) – another autobiographical film about Tove Jansson
