= 44th Guldbagge Awards =

Swedish awards ceremony

- Date: 12 January 2009
- Site: Cirkus, Stockholm
- Hosted by: Johan Glans

Highlights
- Best Picture: Everlasting Moments
- Most awards: Everlasting Moments (4)
- Most nominations: Everlasting Moments (8)

Television coverage
- Network: SVT

The 44th Guldbagge Awards ceremony, presented by the Swedish Film Institute, honored the best Swedish films of 2008, and took place on 12 January 2009. Everlasting Moments directed by Jan Troell was presented with the award for Best Film.

== Winner and nominees ==
=== Awards ===
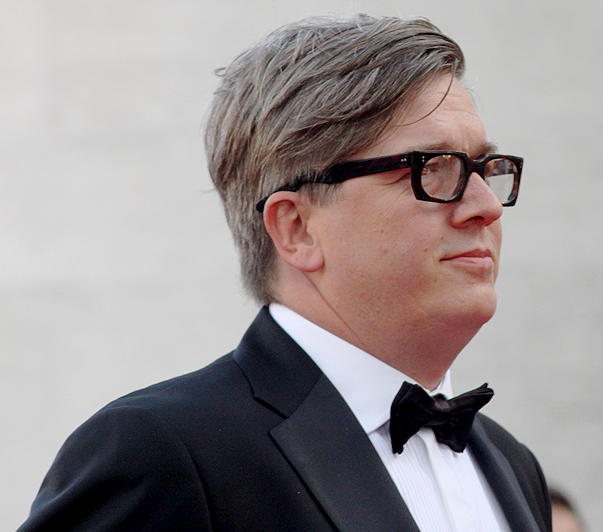
Tomas Alfredson, Best Director winner

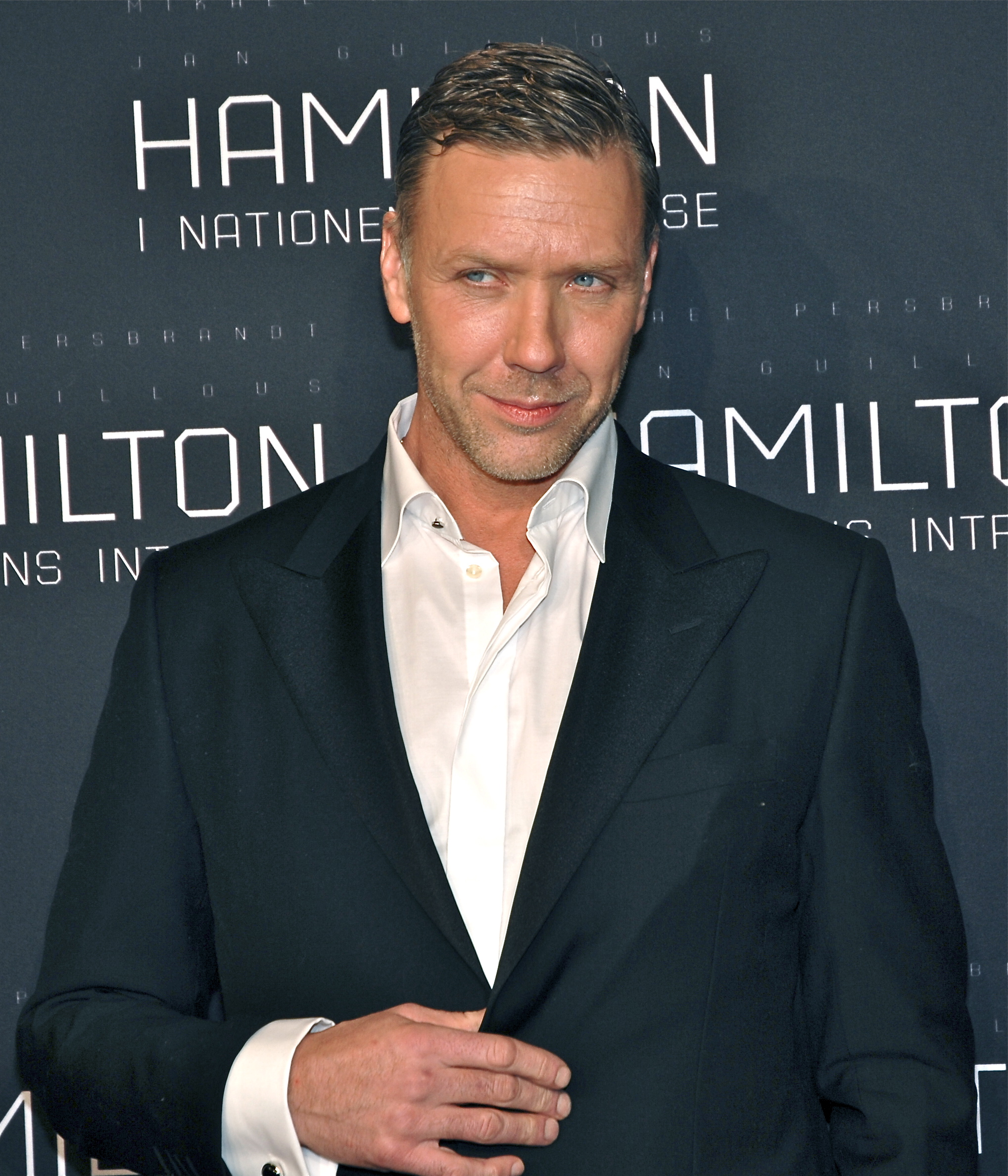
Mikael Persbrandt, Best Actor winner

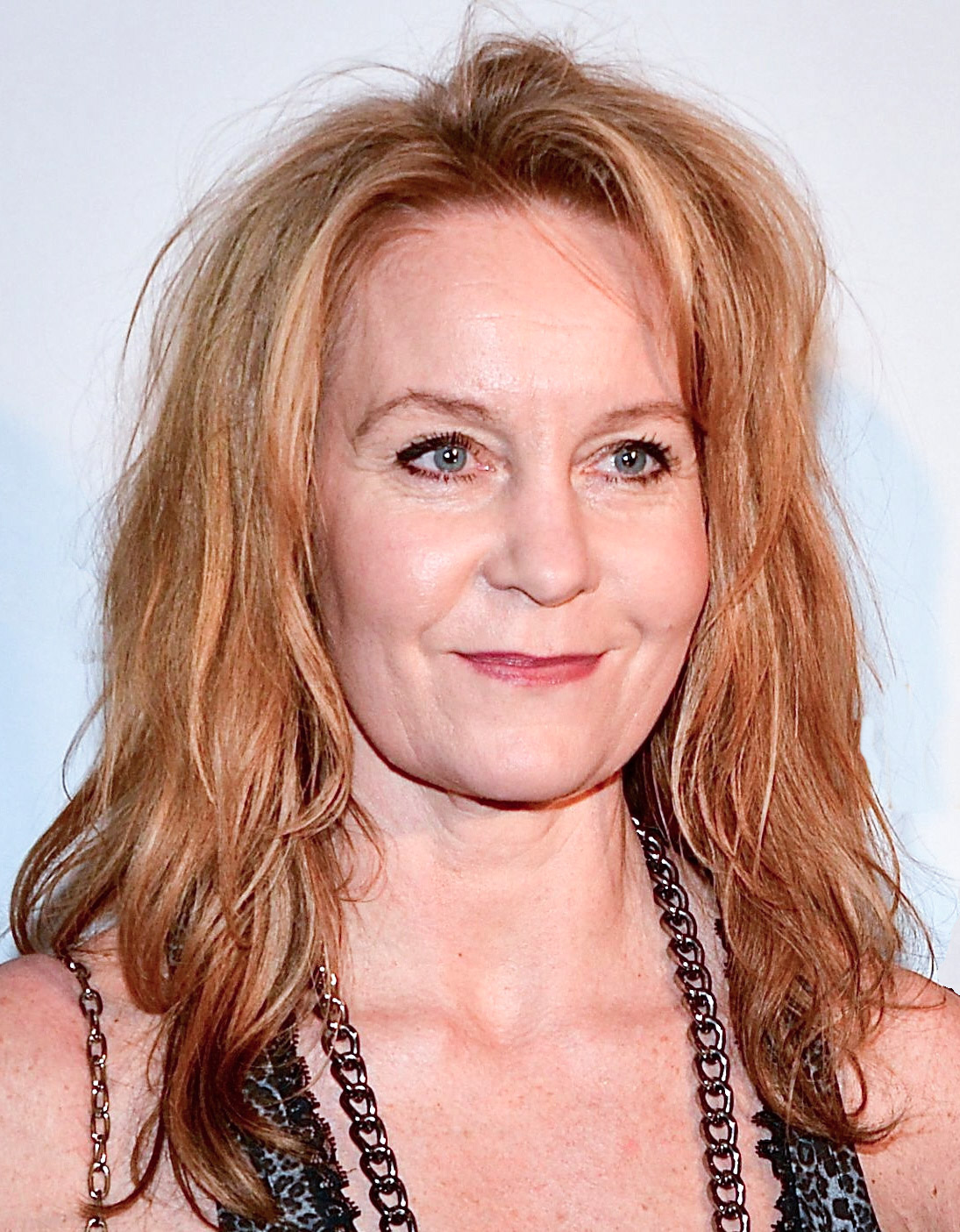
Maria Lundqvist, Best Supporting Actress winner

Best Film: Everlasting Moments – Thomas Stenderup; Involuntary – Erik Hemmendorff; Let the Right One In – John Nordling and Carl Molinder	Best Director: Tomas Alfredson – Let the Right One In; Jan Troell – Everlasting Moments; Ruben Östlund – Involuntary
Best Actress in a leading role: Maria Heiskanen – Everlasting Moments; Lena Endre – Heaven's Heart; Cecilia Milocco – Involuntary	Best Actor in a leading role: Mikael Persbrandt – Everlasting Moments; Gustaf Skarsgård – Patrik, Age 1.5; Peter Stormare – Wolf
Best Supporting Actress: Maria Lundqvist – Heaven's Heart; Amanda Ooms – Everlasting Moments; Marie Robertson – Rally Chicks	Best Supporting Actor: Jesper Christensen – Everlasting Moments; Torkel Petersson – Patrik, Age 1.5; Per Ragnar – Let the Right One In
Best Screenplay: John Ajvide Lindqvist – Let the Right One In; Niklas Rådström, Agneta Ulfsäter-Troell and Jan Troell – Everlasting Moments; Ruben Östlund and Erik Hemmendorff – Involuntary	Best Cinematography: Hoyte van Hoytema – Let the Right One In; Marius Dybwad Brandrud – Involuntary; Jan Troell and Mischa Gavrjusjov – Everlasting Moments
Best Documentary Feature: Maggie in Wonderland – Mark Hammarberg, Ester Martin Bergsmark and Beatrice Maggie Andersson; An Extraordinary Study in Human Degradation – Patrik Eriksson; Mr. Governor – Måns Månsson	Best Shortfilm: Lies – Jonas Odell; Puppetboy – Johannes Nyholm; Instead of Abracadabra – Patrik Eklund
Best Foreign Film: (Taiwan) Lust, Caution – Ang Lee; (United States) No Country for Old Men – Joel and Ethan Coen; (United States) There Will Be Blood – Paul Thomas Anderson	Honorary Award: Harriet Andersson, actress
Gullspiran: Georg Riedel, composer	Cinema Audience Award: Arn – The Kingdom at Road's End; Patrik, Age 1.5; Let the Right One In
Best Achievement: Matti Bye, for the music in Everlasting Moments; Eva Norén, for the production design in Let the Right One In; Per Sundström, Jonas Jansson and Patrik Strömdahl, for the sound in Let the Right One In

== See also ==
- 81st Academy Awards
- 66th Golden Globe Awards
- 62nd British Academy Film Awards
- 15th Screen Actors Guild Awards
- 14th Critics' Choice Awards
- 29th Golden Raspberry Awards
