= Summer Book =

Summer Book may refer to:

- The Summer Book, 1972 novel by Swedish-language Finnish author Tove Jansson
- The Summer Book (film), British-American-Finnish 2024 drama based on Jansson novel
- Summer Book, 2008 Turkish film nominated for European Film Award for European Discovery of the Year
