= Emil Jensen =

Emil Jensen may refer to:

- Emil Jensen (footballer)
- Emil Jensen (musician)
