= Il Capitano: A Swedish Requiem =

- Film poster
- Directed by: Jan Troell
- Written by: Per Olov Enquist; Jan Troell; Göran Setterberg
- Produced by: Göran Setterberg
- Starring: Antti Reini; Maria Heiskanen
- Cinematography: Jan Troell
- Release dates: 15 November 1991 (Sweden); 6 December 1991 (Finland)
- Running time: 110 minutes
- Countries: Sweden; Finland; Germany
- Languages: Finnish; Swedish

Il Capitano: A Swedish Requiem (Swedish: Il Capitano) is a 1991 Swedish-Finnish biographical drama film directed by Jan Troell about the 1988 Åmsele murders in which a family of three was murdered by Juha Valjakkala over a stolen bicycle.

Antti Reini stars as Valjakkala, renamed Jari in the film, and Maria Heiskanen as his girlfriend Marita Routalammi, renamed Minna. Being released so soon after the actual event, the film was very controversial and received highly-mixed reviews, with some critics praising it for the difficult choice of subject and others condemning it for the same reason.

== Cast ==
- Antti Reini as Jari
- Maria Heiskanen as Minna
- Berto Marklund as Police
- Antti Vierikko as Jari age 13
- Harri Mallenius as Teacher
- Marjut Dahlström as Teacher
- Eva Stellby as Post-Mortem Dissector
- Matti Dahlberg as Father
- Christina Frambäck as Priest

== Awards and nominations ==
- Amanda Awards
  - Best Foreign Feature Film (Troell, won)
- 42nd Berlin International Film Festival
  - Best Director (Troell, won)
  - Golden Bear (Troell, nominated)
- Chicago International Film Festival
  - Best Actress (Heiskanen, won)
- 27th Guldbagge Awards
  - Best Film (won)
  - Best Actor (Reini, nominated)
  - Best Cinematography (Troell, nominated)
  - Best Screenplay (Enquist, nominated)
