= Marjatta Tapiola =

Finnish painter (born 1951)

- Born: Marjatta Tapiola; April 30, 1951 (age 74); Sysmä, Finland
- Education: The Finnish Art Academy School
- Known for: Artist

Marjatta Tapiola (born 30 April 1951, Sysmä, Finland) is a Finnish painter.

== Early life and education ==
Marjatta Tapiola was born in 1951 in Sysmä which is a rural area in Finland. Her father Olli Tapiola was a farmer and her mother Kerttu Tapiola was a housekeeper, art dealer and the owner of used bookstore.

Tapiola studied in the Finnish Art Academy School (new name Academy of Fine Arts, Helsinki) between 1969–1974.

== Career ==
Tapiola's debut art exhibition was organized in year 1973 at Jyväskylä, Finland.

At the time of her breakthrough in the 1980s the neo-expressionist art style was gaining popularity; however Tapiola's art does not necessarily fit inside these boundaries. Some typical elements in Tapiola's paintings are minotaurs, horses and skulls. Tapiola's newer paintings are said to be characterized by fluent drawing quality and multilayered lines. Recent works often feature network of lines on a pale background.

In February 2013 the portrait of the President of Finland, Sauli Niinistö painted by Marjatta Tapiola sparked controversy and got considerable media attention in Finland.

Tapiola's recent exhibits include Marjatta Tapiola: Paintings at Galarie Forsblom in Helsinki (2019), Marjatta Tapiola: Paintings 2017-2021 at Kajaani Art Museum in Kajaani (2021), and Marjatta Tapiola: In Other Words at the Lahti Museum of Visual Arts Malva in Lahti (2022).

Tapiola is represented by Galarie Forsblom.

== Awards ==
Marjatta Tapiola has received several awards during her career. In 2004 she was awarded the Pro Finlandia medal.

- 2006 Kuvataiteen valtionpalkinto [State Prize for Fine Arts]
- 2005 Hämäläis-Osakunnan kunniamerkki
- 2004 Pro Finlandia Prize
- 2004 Grant of the Finnish Cultural Foundation (in Finnish Suomen Kulttuurirahaston palkinto)
- 1981 Suomen Arvostelijain liiton Kritiikin kannukset 1980 Suomen Taideyhdistyksen Dukaattipalkinto

== Literature ==
- Tapiola, Marjatta, Karvonen, Kirsti & Tiainen, Jussi: Marjatta Tapiola. Helsinki: Parvs Publishing, 2006. ISBN 978-952-5654-02-8.

== Personal life ==
Marjatta Tapiola has two daughters, writer Aina Bergroth (b. 1975) and film director and screenwriter Zaida Bergroth (b. 1977).
