= Matti Bye =

Swedish pianist and composer

Matti Bye (born 25 July 1966) is a Swedish pianist and composer. He has composed music for over 30 films and TV series as well as additional scores for theatre and dance pieces. In 2014, he was nominated twice at Sweden's Guldbagge Awards in which his soundtrack for the film Faro won the award. He also won a Gudbagge in 2009 for his score for the film Everlasting Moments. He has recorded and released numerous solo and collaboration records, include Hydra's Dream, with Anna von Hausswolff; Maailma, with cult Finnish songwriter Lau Nau; and has collaborated live with producer and musician Samuli Kosminen.

== Life and career ==
Bye was brought up by his mother, renowned Swedish actress Birgitta Andersson, while his father was Norwegian playwright Anders Bye. At the age of 20, Stockholm's celebrated Cinematheque Theatre contacted Bye about performing live to old silent films. "Silent film music was like a blank spot on the music map, but I recognised the freedom I’d have as a musician, and the force of the poetry in these forgotten images. To play piano for these films was like a dream. So I started my own ‘university’ in the cinema, improvising directly in front of the film screen, trying new pieces and styles in front of a live audience. The beauty is that you feel the past through these beautiful films,“ he says of the style that gradually developed in this environment, “but through the music you can add a new layer of something contemporary too." As his reputation spread, Bye recognised that, thanks to the diversity of his interests, he'd stumbled on a singularly romantic style. "I started out as a piano improviser," he says, "and suddenly I realised I was composing, and that I’m a composer."

By the late 1990s, Bye had progressed from silent films to composing for new ones, including documentaries. Since then Bye has composed music to over 30 films not to mention a host of music to theatre and dance pieces. In 2014 he received two of the three nominations for Best Original Music Award at Sweden's prestigious Guldbaggen – his soundtrack for Faro took the honour (as well as a Nordic Film Music Prize) ahead of his work for The Hundred-Year-Old Man Who Climbed Out the Window And Disappeared. He's also provided new music for, among others, Victor Sjöström's seminal horror The Phantom Carriage (1921) and The Saga of Gosta Berling (1924), a landmark melodrama starring Greta Garbo.

He's recorded a number of solo works, too, not least 2010's Drömt and 2013's Bethanien, the latter inspired by a two-year sojourn in Berlin working in Kreuzbergcultural centre of the same name. In the fall of 2017 Bye will release a new solo record titled This Forgotten Land as well as a soundtrack to the film Superswede.

== Discography ==
- 2003 – Matti Bye: Körlkarlen (Rotor)
- 2008 – Maailma – Noitalauluja (Tjärnen)
- 2008 – Matti Bye: Gösta Berlings Saga (Rotor)
- 2009 – Vinter – Vinter II (Tjärnen)
- 2009 – Matti Bye: Drömt (Rotor)
- 2011 – Matti Bye, Mattias Olsson & Martina Hoogland Ivanow: Elephant & Castle (Kning Disk)
- 2013 – Walrus (Electricity Records)
- 2013 – Matti Bye: Faro (Rotor)
- 2013 – Bethanien (Tona Serenad)
- 2014 – Maiilma: Speculum (Rotor)
- 2014 – Hundraåringen som klev ut genom fönstret och försvann
- 2014 – Hydras Dream: The Little Match Girl (Denovali)
- 2016 – A Serious Game (Cosmos Music)
- 2016 – Elephant made the piano EP (1631 Recordings)
- 2017 – This Forgotten Land (Tona Serenad)
- 2017 – Superswede (Original Film Soundtrack)
- 2019 – One Last Deal (Tuntematon mestari)
- 2021 – Tove (Original Motion Picture Soundtrack)
- 2021 – Young Royals (Soundtrack from the Netflix series)
- 2022 – Young Royals: Season 2 (Soundtrack from the Netflix series)
- 2025 – Never Alone (Ei koskaan yksin)

=== Music for film ===
- 1916 – Dödskyssen (short) (restored version: 2002)
- 1919 – Herr Arnes Pengar "Sir Arnes´s Treasures" (Mauritz Stiller)
- 1920 – Erotikon (Mauritz Stiller)
- 1921 – Körkarlen "Phantom Carriage" (Victor Sjöström)
- 1922 – Häxan "Witchcraft through ages" (restored version: 2006)
- 1924 – Gösta Berling Saga "The Saga of Gosta Berling" (Mauritz Stiller)
- 1995 – Sista skriket "The Last Gasp" (TV play by Ingmar Bergman)
- 1998 – Homo Sapiens 1900 (documentary by Peter Cohen)
- 1999 – Vuxna människor (Felix Henrgren)
- 2005 – En god dag "A Good Day" (short)
- 2005 – Krama mig "Love and Happiness" (Kristina Humle)
- 2006 – Brevbärarens hemlighet (short)
- 2006 – Quinze (short)
- 2006 – En uppstoppad hund (TV movie)
- 2007 – Fritt fall (short)
- 2008 – Mellan oss (short)
- 2008 – Maria Larssons eviga ögonblick "Everlasting Moments" (Jan Troell)
- 2009 – Elkland (short)
- 2009 – Bilder från lekstugan "Images from The Playground" (documentary about Ingmar Bergman)
- 2010 – Sebbe (Babak Najafi)
- 2010 – Filmen var min älskarinna "…But Film is My Mistress" (documentary about Ingmar Bergman)
- 2011 – Bibliotekstjuven (TV series)
- 2011 – Snigeln (short, Jan Troell)
- 2013 – Faro (Fredrik Edfelt)
- 2013 – Hundraåringen som klev ut genom fönstret och försvann (Felix Herngren)
- 2015 – Förvaret (documentary)
- 2016 – Den Allvarsamma Leken (Pernilla August)
- 2016 – Hundraettåringen som smet från notan och försvann (Felix Herngren, Måns Herngren)
- 2017 – Enkelstöten (TV 4)
- 2017 – Superswede (Nice Drama)
- 2019 – Tuntematon mestari (Klaus Härö)
- 2020 – Livet efter döden (Klaus Härö)
- 2020 – Tove (Zaida Bergroth)
- 2021 – Young royals (Netflix)
- 2022 – Dag för dag (Felix Herngren)
- 2022 – Marcel! (Jasmine Trinca)
