= Per Olov Jansson =

Finnish photographer (1920–2019)

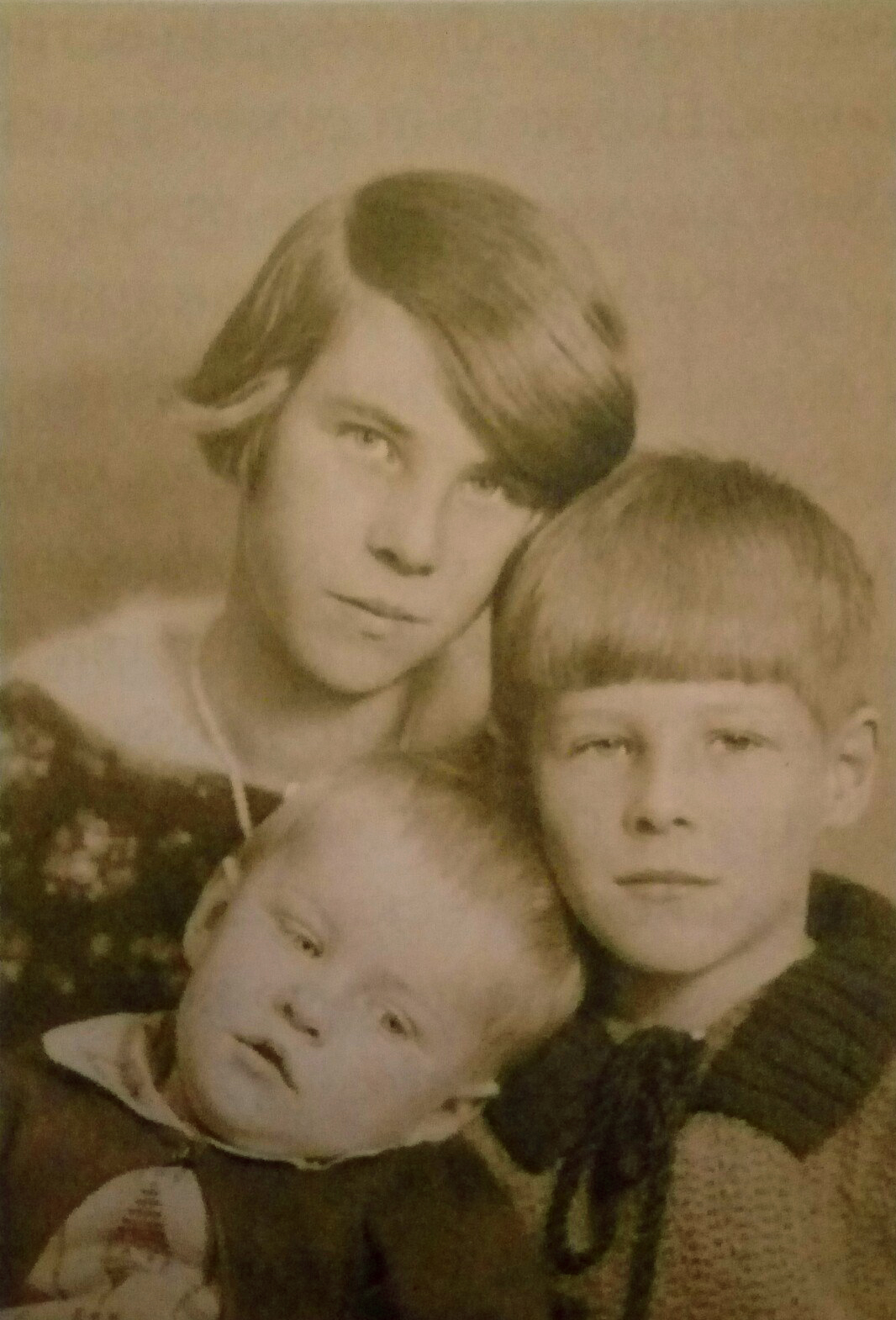
- Per Olov Jansson with his siblings, 1920s
- Born: 22 April 1920; Helsinki, Finland
- Died: 7 February 2019 (aged 98); Vantaa, Finland
- Occupation: Photographer
- Parent(s): Viktor Jansson; Signe Hammarsten-Jansson
- Relatives: Tove Jansson (sister); Lars Jansson (brother); Sophia Jansson (niece)

Per Olov Jansson (22 April 1920 – 7 February 2019) was a Swedish-speaking Finnish photographer.

== Early life ==
He is the son of artists Viktor Jansson and Swedish-born Signe Hammarsten-Jansson, and the brother of writer Tove Jansson and cartoonist Lars Jansson. His photography has appeared in books by Tove Jansson, including Skurken i Muminhuset (1980) and Anteckningar från en ö (1993), and Tove's 1971 novel, Lyssnerskan is dedicated to him. He is also responsible for a great number of photos of his sister.

Jansson's photographs have been described as emphasizing the act of artistic creation and his technique has been noted to rely heavily on perspective and the relationship between light, dark, and medium contrast.

During the 1950s, he formed a company called Aerofoto with his brother Lars. Despite his long photographic career, Jansson's first photo exhibition only occurred in 2000 to coincide with his 80th birthday.
