= Maria Heiskanen =

Finnish actress (born 1970)

- Born: Maria Heiskanen; 21 August 1970 (age 55); Kuopio, Finland
- Years active: 1991–present
- Spouse: Sami Tossavainen
- Awards: 28th CIFF Gold Plaque Award, Achievement in Acting (Female); 1992 Il Capitano; Valladolid International Film Festival, Best Actress; 2008 Everlasting moments

Maria Heiskanen (born 21 August 1970) is a Finnish actress. She works in cinema, television and theatre.

== Life ==
Heiskanen's early role in the 1991 Swedish film Il Capitano: A Swedish Requiem directed by Jan Troell. For her role Heiskanen won the Gold Plaque Award in Chicago International Film Festival for the Best Actress in 1992. Heiskanen lived in Sweden 1993–2003 and worked in movies and theatre. She played in the Royal Dramatic Theatre and in the National Swedish Touring Theatre where she for example performed the role of Masja in Anton Chekhovs The Seagull (2008) directed by Lars Norén.

In Finland Heiskanen has worked with Aki Kaurismäki in Lights in the Dusk (2006). She also played in Aleksi Salmenperä's A Man's Work (2007) and was nominated for Jussi Awards from both performances.

In 2008, Heiskanen starred in the leading role of Jan Troell's Everlasting Moments, for which she won the Guldbagge Award for Best Actress and the Best Actress Award from Valladolid International Film Festival. The film won the Guldbagge Award for Best Film and was nominated for Best Foreign Language Film at the 66th Golden Globe Awards. It also made the January shortlist for Best Foreign Language Film at the 81st Academy Awards, but wasn't selected as one of the final nominees.

== Selected filmography ==
- Il Capitano: A Swedish Requiem (1991)
- 10:10 (2000)
- Moa & Malte (2000)
- As White as in Snow (2001)
- Hus i helvete (2002)
- Lights in the dusk (2006)
- A Man's Job (2007)
- Heaven (2007)
- Everlasting Moments (2008)
- The Last Sentence (2012)
- All That Matters Is Past (2012)
- Ravens (2017)
- Fallen Leaves (2023)
