= Sophia Jansson =

Finnish businessperson and artistic director of Moomin Characters Oy Ltd (born 1962)

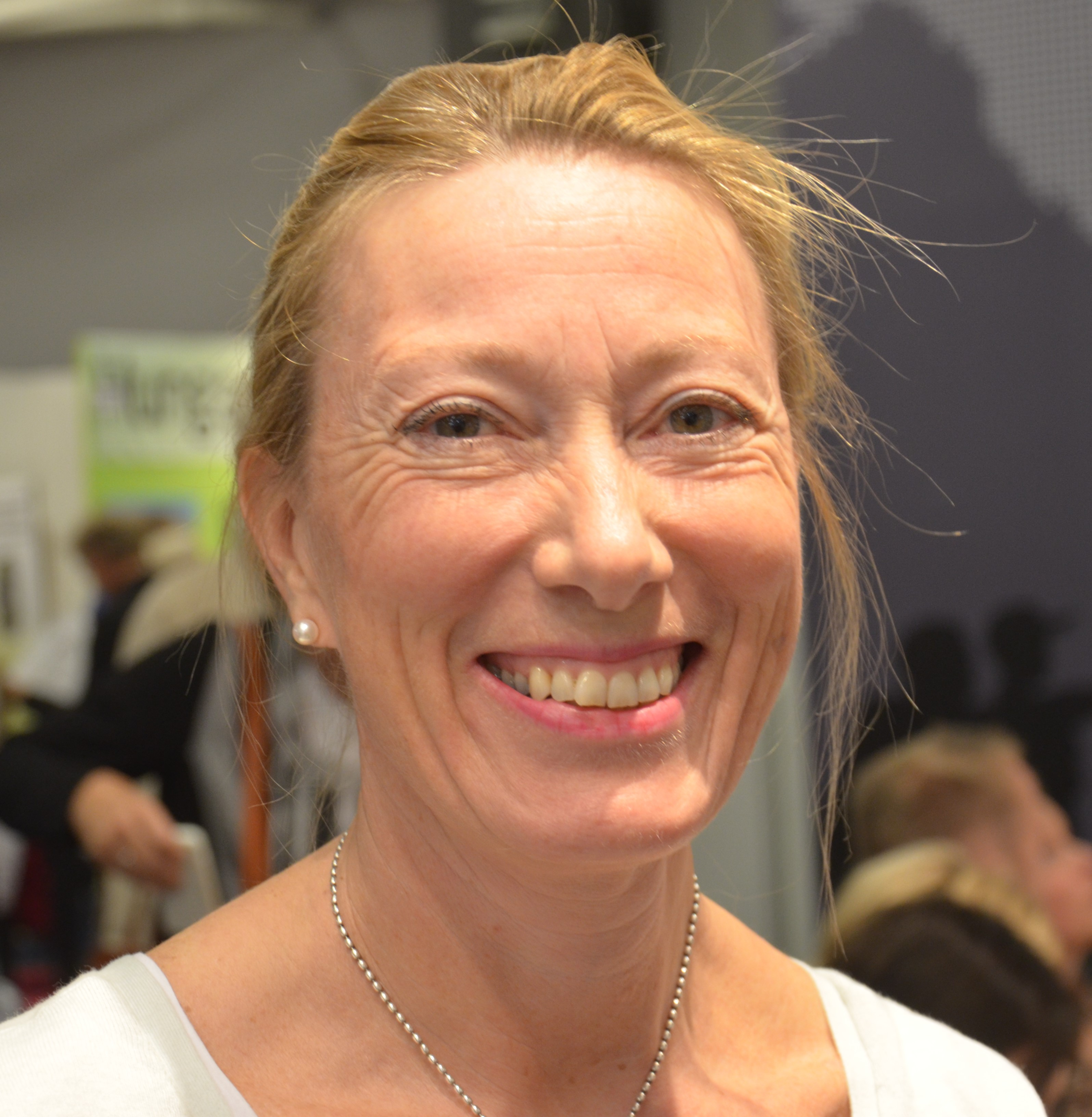
- Jansson in 2014
- Born: Vivica Sophia Jansson; 1962 (age 63–64); Helsinki, Finland
- Occupations: Artistic director, Moomin Characters Oy Ltd
- Parent: Lars Jansson
- Relatives: Tove Jansson (paternal aunt); Viktor Jansson (paternal grandfather); Signe Hammarsten-Jansson (paternal grandmother); Per Olov Jansson (paternal uncle)
- Website: www.moomin.fi

Vivica Sophia Jansson (born 1962 in Helsinki) is the daughter of cartoonist Lars Jansson and the niece of the famous Finnish writer and painter Tove Jansson. Jansson has worked as a Spanish language teacher, creative/artistic director, chairman, and majority shareholder of Oy Moomin Characters, Ltd, and provided direct oversight together with her father for the 1990 Moomin animated series.

== Moomin Characters Oy Ltd ==
Growing up in the center of the collaboration of efforts between her aunt and father, Jansson gained an intimate window into the creative processes behind the Moomin comic strip series. As Tove's efforts became directed more at writing and the strip's production became more the effort of her father, Jansson became an active help in management of the visual aspects of Moomin as an intellectual property.

In 1979, Lars Jansson founded the limited liability company, Moomin Characters Oy Ltd, now headed by Roleff Kråkström. According to a 2004 article in the Finnish business magazine Talouselämä, Oy Moomin Characters, Ltd is Finland's most cost-effective business, with some 80 Moomin licences in Finland and almost 300 abroad. It has been listed as among the top Creative Export Companies of Finland in 2007.

Since 1993, Jansson, together with her father, has managed the production of a new series of Moomin strips which Jansson now manages solely.

In 2006 Jansson took the role of director in the release of the CD, Muumipeikko ja Pyrstötähti.

In 2008, the rediscovery by Jansson of the manuscript for "The King in Moominland" (a TV script written by Tove and Lars in the late 60s) made news as the resulting musical performed at the Åbo Svenska Teater represented the first performance of this "lost episode" in decades.

== Sophia Jansson in film and print ==
Lars Jansson produced both Moomin strips as well as others including a short strip called Sophia which he produced for a publication called Jaana in 1965.

In May 2003, the Finnish Embassy in London arranged for events to surround the recent translation of Tove Jansson's 1972 Sommarboken, a novel which featured the fictionalized life of the young Sophia on an island. During this event, publishers presented works by Sophia Jansson and Johanna Sinisalo. Jansson was later interviewed in June 2003 by The Daily Telegraph where she explained the details surrounding the story presented in Sommarboken and the relationship shared between Jansson and her aunt, Tove Jansson. She would write in more detail about this topic in 2006 in the Scandinavian Review, and again in 2010 for The Guardian, when she explained the nature of her relationship with the rest of the family including her grandmother Signe and Tove's partner, Tuulikki Pietilä.

Jansson has been credited in such books as Tove Jansson's 1989 Rent Spel and Kate McLoughlin's and Malin Lidström Brock's 2007 Tove Jansson Rediscovered among others.

Jansson has appeared as the host of 1998's short film, Haru: The Island of the Solitary, Introduced by Sophia Jansson. She has also featured in Paul Gravett's 2006 documentary film, Moomin's Memoirs, presented at the March 2007 Tove Jansson Conference in Oxford.

== Honors and awards ==
In 2001, following the death of her aunt, Jansson went to the UK to help Sort of Books promote the re-release of a Moomin picture book.

In June 2004, Jansson was invited by the Consulate General of Finland to the 31st "Dreams & Visions" Annual Children's Literature Conference in California. The Consulate sponsored her trip. Here, Jansson represented Finnish children's literature during an engaging lecture and presentation.

In August 2004, Jansson launched the silver Tove Jansson and Children's Culture collector's coin, receiving the first pressing from Raimo Makkonen, CEO of the Mint of Finland. She served as a judge in the selection of the coin's images, as well as the series of medals that were also issued.

In 2006 Jansson was invited as a notable speaker for one of the Monthly Luncheons hosted by IWC Helsinki.

In February 2007 Jansson was invited to speak at the Scandinavia House in New York City.

In September 2008 Jansson participated as a member of the Committee of Honor in the renowned IBBY World Congress.

Jansson participated in the Helsinki Design Week 2008.
