= Everlasting Moments =

2008 Swedish film by Jan Troell

- US theatrical poster
- Directed by: Jan Troell
- Written by: Niklas Rådström; Jan Troell; Agneta Ulfsäter-Troell
- Produced by: Thomas Stenderup
- Starring: Maria Heiskanen; Mikael Persbrandt; Jesper Christensen
- Narrated by: Callin Öhrvall
- Cinematography: Jan Troell; Mischa Gavrjusjov
- Edited by: Niels Pagh Andersen
- Music by: Matti Bye
- Distributed by: Sandrew Metronome (Nordic countries); IFC Films (US); Icon Film Distribution (UK)
- Release dates: 5 September 2008 (Toronto Film Festival); 5 September 2008 (Sweden)
- Running time: 131 minutes
- Country: Sweden
- Languages: Swedish; Finnish
- Budget: $7 million

Everlasting Moments (Swedish: Maria Larssons eviga ögonblick, lit. 'Maria Larsson's Eternal Moment') is a 2008 Swedish drama film directed by Jan Troell, starring Maria Heiskanen, Mikael Persbrandt and Jesper Christensen. It is based on the true story of Maria Larsson, a Swedish working class woman in the early 20th century, who wins a camera in a lottery and goes on to become a photographer. It has been compared to Troell's previous films Here's Your Life and As White as in Snow, which are both set around the same period.

The film won the Guldbagge Award for Best Film and was nominated for Best Foreign Language Film at the 66th Golden Globe Awards. It also made the January shortlist for Best Foreign Language Film at the 81st Academy Awards, but it was not selected as one of the final nominees.

== Plot ==
Maria, a Finn in Sweden, wins a valuable Contessa camera in a lottery with a man named Sigfrid Larsson, and they agree to marry to share the prize. They have numerous children. In the early 1900s, Maria takes the camera to a shop owned by the Danish-Swede Sebastian Pedersen, looking to see what price she can get if she sells it. Mr. Pederson promises to give her an estimate, and takes her photo as she leaves. When she returns to the shop, she is amazed to see the photograph of herself, and wonders how the technology works. Mr. Pederson gives her some explanation as to photography and imagery. He then gives her updated camera equipment to go with the Contessa.

Though she has no money to pay for the equipment, Mr. Pederson accepts the camera itself as payment, allowing her to use it though he owns it. She uses the camera to photograph her four children, telling them not to tell anyone, including Sigfrid. She then uses it for post-mortem photography on a girl named Ingeborg, giving a copy to Ingeborg's mother for free. Maria shows another copy of the memorial photograph to Mr. Pederson. Impressed by Maria's natural talent and vision, he accepts the photograph as payment for the Contessa. When Sigfrid is briefly arrested after an explosion during a strike killed one and injured six strikebreakers, Maria reveals the photograph of the children to him. He is later released after a witness confirms his non-involvement.

Five years later in 1914, the Great War breaks across Europe to the south of Sweden, and Maria, who has fallen out of touch with Pederson, shows up at his shop again to discuss taking photos of uniformed men. The monarchs of Scandinavia meet to discuss how to keep their countries out of the conflict, with Maria attending and taking a photograph of the kings' public appearance. She is shocked to learn her photograph of the monarchs was purchased and published by a newspaper. As the children learn more about the Ten Commandments, including Thou shalt not commit adultery, they note Sigfrid's womanizing and Maria's friendship to Mr. Pederson.

Mr. Pederson takes a portrait photograph of Maria, and they move to first-name basis. Sigfrid sees the photograph, and enraged, takes it as proof of being cuckolded by Sebastian. He violently confronts Maria, even though she points out his relationships with women. After an incident of marital rape, Maria attempts but fails to carry out a self-induced abortion. She later blames herself when the child, a son, is crippled by polio. When Maria and the children enjoy seeing a Charlie Chaplin film, Sigfrid becomes enraged again at his belief his children are being taken away from him. He puts a knife to her throat, and while he does not kill her, he receives another longer prison sentence. While he is away, the children urge Maria to separate from him, arguing the household is better off without Sigfrid. Sigfrid is later released and Maria reconciles with him, though Maja expresses bewilderment as to why. Shortly after a social outing, Maria dies. Years later, Maja discovers Maria's only self-portrait, taken in a mirror between the outing and her death.

== Cast ==
- Maria Heiskanen as Maria Larsson
- Mikael Persbrandt as Sigfrid Larsson
- Jesper Christensen as Sebastian Pedersen
- Nellie Almgren as Maja (age 7–9)
- Callin Öhrvall as Maja (age 14–22)
- Birte Heribertsson as Maja (narrator) / Aunt Tora
- Emil Jensen as Englund
- Ghita Nørby as Miss Fagerdal
- Hans Henrik Clemensen as Mr. Fagerdal
- Amanda Ooms as Mathilda
- Claire Wikholm as Grandmother Karna
- Antti Reini as Finnish Sea Captain
- Annika Lundgren as Miss Öst
- Johanna Troell as Margareta
- Ann Petrén as Ida
- Maria Lundqvist as Miss Petrén
- Sanna Persson as Månse-Lotta
- Maria Kulle as Aunt Anna
- Hans Alfredson as Prison Guard
- Livia Millhagen as Ingeborg's Mother
- Henrik Persson as Ville Larsson (age 14–21)
- Sigrid Hemer Nordenhake as Stina Larsson (age 12–19)
- Max Eskilsson as Sven (age 14–17)
- Julia Ragnarsson as Anna Larsson (age 12)
- Andreas Ahlm as Elon Larsson (age 7)
- Emil Dämhagen as Erik Larsson (age 5)
- Karl Linnertorp as Gunnar Larsson (age 14–21)
- Rickard Nygren as Police
- Alexander Kathy as Anton Nilson
- Lukas Wägbo as Algot Rosberg

== Production ==
With financing from 26 organisations from five different countries; Sweden, Denmark, Norway, Finland and Germany; the film was Troell's largest project since The Emigrants in the early 1970s. Agneta Ulfsäter-Troell, Jan Troell's wife, started doing research and interviews in 1986 with Maja Larsson, Maria Larsson's daughter, who was a cousin to Ulfsäter-Troell's father. During her research she found Maria's pictures, which were used as inspiration for the pictures seen in the film. The material wasn't organized, but when a person at the Swedish Film Institute heard about the story and how Jan Troell was interested in turning it into a film, an early process for a manuscript was started.

The first official meeting took place in early 2004. Troell said that the casting choice of Maria Heiskanen and Jesper Christensen, both of whom had starred in Troell films previously, had always been "obvious." Two years before filming started, Troell met Mikael Persbrandt at a film festival in Sweden and started to imagine him in the role of Sigfrid. Persbrandt then contacted Troell himself and persuaded him into giving him the role. A major difference between the film and the actual story is that the real Maria Larsson lived in Gothenburg, while the film takes place in Malmö, where Jan Troell himself comes from.

Filming took place between 26 February and 1 June 2007 in Malmö and Luleå, Sweden, and Vilnius, Lithuania. The film was shot on 16 mm film, and then blown up to 35 mm. "Then you get a little grainy picture that fits the turn of the [20th] century era and also relates to the early silent cinema. I have deliberately kept the colours down and used similar sepia tones as those in for example Victor Sjöström's films," Troell explains this idea.

== Release ==
The film premiered as part of the Masters selection at the 2008 Toronto International Film Festival. On 24 September the same year it was released in Sweden. IFC Films acquired the American distribution rights and gave the film a limited release on 6 March 2009. At its peak it was running in 30 theatres during the same weekend. It was released in the United Kingdom on 22 May 2009 through Icon Film. A US DVD and Blu-ray was released in June 2010 through The Criterion Collection, as part of a collaboration between The Criterion Collection and IFC Films.

== Reception ==
Everlasting Moments has an approval rating of 90% on review aggregator website Rotten Tomatoes, based on 105 reviews, and an average rating of 7.6/10. The website's critical consensus states: "Elegant and intimate, Everlasting Moments moves at the deliberate and gentle pace of a classical European period drama". Metacritic assigned the film a weighted average score of 80 out of 100, based on 24 critics, indicating generally favorable reviews. The average rating from 21 reviews collected at the Swedish-language site Kritiker.se was 4.0 out of 5.

=== Accolades ===
In addition to the awards and nominations, Everlasting Moments was also Sweden's submission for the Academy Award for Best Foreign Language Film at the 81st Academy Awards. It was among the nine films that made it to the January shortlist, but was not selected as one of the final nominees.

Award	Date of ceremony	Category	Recipient(s)	Result	Ref(s)
Golden Globes	11 January 2009	Best Foreign Language Film	Jan Troell	Nominated	
Guldbagge Awards	12 January 2009	Best Film	Thomas Stenderup	Won	
Guldbagge Awards	12 January 2009	Best Actress	Maria Heiskanen	Won	
Guldbagge Awards	12 January 2009	Best Actor	Mikael Persbrandt	Won	
Guldbagge Awards	12 January 2009	Best Supporting Actor	Jesper Christensen	Won	
Guldbagge Awards	12 January 2009	Special Achievement – Best Music	Matti Bye	Won	
Guldbagge Awards	12 January 2009	Best Direction	Jan Troell	Nominated	
Guldbagge Awards	12 January 2009	Best Supporting Actress	Amanda Ooms	Nominated	
Guldbagge Awards	12 January 2009	Best Screenplay	Niklas Rådström, Jan Troell and Agneta Ulfsäter-Troell	Nominated	
Guldbagge Awards	12 January 2009	Best Cinematography	Jan Troell and Mischa Gavrjusjov	Nominated	
Valladolid International Film Festival	2008	Best Actress	Maria Heiskanen	Won	
Valladolid International Film Festival	2008	Best Director of Photography	Jan Troell and Mischa Gavrjusjov	Won	

== See also ==
- List of submissions to the 81st Academy Awards for Best Foreign Language Film
- List of Swedish submissions for the Academy Award for Best Foreign Language Film
