= Eeva Putro =

Finnish actress

Eeva Putro is a Finnish actress and screenwriter.

== Biography ==
Putro was born in Vantaa, Finland.

In 2021 Putro's film Tove was the Finnish submission to the 93rd Academy Awards for Best International Feature Film.

== Filmography ==
- 2007 - The Border
- 2008 - Blackout
- 2009 - Forbidden Fruit
- 2011 - Isän kuolema
- 2011 - The Inspector
- 2011 - Silence
- 2017 - Innuendo
- 2019 - Joulukalenteri: Tonttuakatemia
- 2020 - Tove (also wrote the screenplay)
