= Viktor Jansson =

Finnish sculptor (1886–1958)

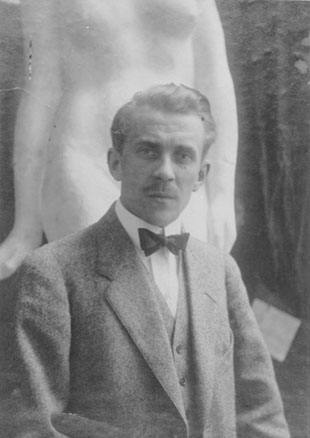
- Born: Viktor Bernhard Jansson; 1 March 1886; Helsinki, Grand Duchy of Finland
- Died: 22 June 1958 (aged 72); Helsinki, Finland
- Occupation: Sculptor
- Spouse: Signe Hammarsten
- Children: Tove Jansson; Per Olov Jansson; Lars Jansson
- Relatives: Sophia Jansson (granddaughter)

Viktor Bernhard "Faffan" Jansson (1 March 1886 in Helsinki – 22 June 1958 in Helsinki) was a Finnish sculptor belonging to the Swedish-speaking minority of Finland.

== Early life ==
Jansson was born in Helsinki in 1886 to Julius Viktor Jansson and Johanna Theresia (Karlsson). His father worked at the Stockmann department store, later owning a haberdashery store. His father died when Jansson was six.

He married the illustrator Signe Hammarsten-Jansson and they had three children: the writer Tove Jansson, photographer Per Olov Jansson, and Lars Jansson, an author and comic strip artist.

Starting from 1929 Viktor Jansson created several drafts for sculptures picturing young women, one of which is called Convolvulus. The other sculpture from the same series named Youth (Nuoruus) is situated in Hämeenlinna. These two sculptures are united by attempt to create images of excellence and clarity through a somehow abstract form.

He studied at Läroverket för gossar och flickor.

== Works ==
- Lahden vapaudenpatsas (the statue of liberty of Lahti), 1920
- Tampereen vapaudenpatsas (the statue of liberty of Tampere), 1920
- Kajastus, 1930 (situated in Tampere, Sorsapuisto park)
- Convolvulus, 1931 (situated in Helsinki, Kaisaniemi park), which depicts a young woman. Convolvulus stands for lesser bindweed or field bindweed. In this masterpiece the woman raises her hand in a half-protecting, half-blessing gesture. This sculpture is often said to symbolize spring's arrival to the north. The sculpture was born as a result of a competition organised by Helsinki City in 1930–31 to decorate Helsinki with public works of art. It is made out of bronze and is 240 cm high. Another version of Convolvulus is 120 cm high and stands on the grave of Bertel Hintze in the old part of Hietaniemi cemetery.
- Nuoruus (Youth), 1931 (situated in Hämeenlinna center in Kirjaston puisto) is of bronze, measuring 177 × 50 × 47,5 cm, on a base of grey granite 71 × 50,5 × 58,5 cm

The model for Kajastus, Convolvulus and Nuoruus was Tove Jansson, the daughter of the sculptor.

== Sources ==
1. Helsinki Art Museum, Public Art Section
2. Hämeenlinna Art Museum, Public Art Section
