= Signe Hammarsten-Jansson =

Swedish artist (1882–1970)

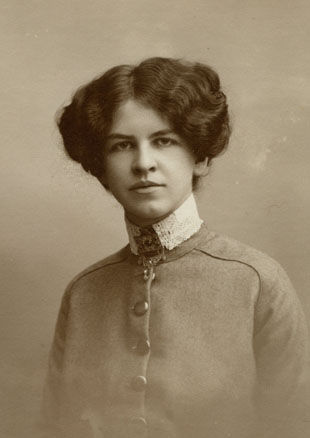
- Born: 1 June 1882; Hannäs, Union of Sweden and Norway
- Died: 6 July 1970 (aged 88); Porvoo, Finland
- Education: Stockholms tekniska skola
- Occupations: Graphic artist, illustrator, caricaturist
- Known for: Finland's first professional stamp designer; mother of Tove Jansson
- Spouse: Viktor Jansson
- Children: Tove Jansson; Per Olov Jansson; Lars Jansson
- Relatives: Sophia Jansson (granddaughter); Einar Hammarsten (brother)

Signe "Ham" Hammarsten-Jansson (née Hammarsten, 1 June 1882 – 6 July 1970) was a Sweden-born graphic artist, illustrator and caricaturist who spent most of her career in Finland. She was Finland's first professional stamp designer, designing around 220 Finnish postage stamps over three decades. She was the mother of Tove Jansson, creator of the Moomin characters.

== Biography ==
=== Early life and education ===
Signe Hammarsten was born in Hannäs, came from a respectable Swedish clerical family and was the child of a pastor's daughter and a court chaplain. Hammarsten's parents were opposed to her becoming an artist, and as a girl she had considered a career as a surgeon. In the autumn of 1902 she enrolled at the Stockholms tekniska skola (Stockholm Technical School), where she trained as a draughtsperson and professional artist. She began to work as a drawing teacher at a Stockholm girls' school.

It was during a study trip to Paris in 1910 that Hammarsten met the sculptor Viktor Jansson. In 1913 they were married and they lived in Paris for a year before moving to Finland in 1914.

=== Career in Finland ===
==== Caricaturist ====
Hammarsten-Jansson quickly established contacts with publishers, journalists and artists in Helsinki. Her first caricatures in Finland were published in 1915, and she achieved her breakthrough as a caricaturist in 1916 with drawings for the satirical magazines Fyren and Lucifer, where she worked under the signature Ham. Around 350 of her caricatures appeared in Lucifer alone. The political satire magazine Garm, which was published for thirty years from 1923 to 1953, featured around 120 of her caricatures and nearly 400 other drawings; she also gave the magazine its general visual character and drew many of its cover images.

==== Book illustrator and cover artist ====
Hammarsten-Jansson's career as a cover artist and book illustrator began in 1918. She was particularly sought after by Finland-Swedish publishers such as Schildts and Söderströms. Her covers are characterised by a harmonious, near-graphic style in which the form of the lettering often dictates the overall design, and by a sparing use of colour that served both aesthetic and practical purposes, keeping printing costs down. She was a pioneer of this style, which is easily recognisable in paperback books from the period. She made a habit of reading the proofs of books she was illustrating in order to adapt her drawing style to the content.

==== Stamp designer ====
In 1924, Hammarsten-Jansson took a part-time position as a draughtsperson at the banknote printing works of the Bank of Finland. A new career as a stamp designer opened up for her in 1929, when three of her designs were printed as stamps for the 700th anniversary of the city of Turku; of these, her drawing of Turku Cathedral was later chosen as Finland's most beautiful stamp. The following year she designed the classic lion stamp, which was printed in many editions running to millions of copies. From 1934 she designed the annual charity stamp series benefiting the Finnish Red Cross, and after retiring from the banknote printing works in 1954 she continued to design stamps until 1962, producing a total of around 220 Finnish stamps over three decades.

=== Family ===
A daughter, Tove Jansson, was born to the couple shortly thereafter. The couple had three children in total: Tove, Lars Jansson and Per Olov Jansson. Born to artistic parents, the children grew up in a Bohemian lifestyle, and all became artists in their own right. Tove became a writer and painter and would gain particular fame for her Moomin series. Lars became a cartoonist, ultimately becoming responsible for the Moomin comic strips as well as a later animated version. Per Olov became a photographer and collaborated with Tove on a few books. The children were directly influenced by their mother's artistic sensibilities and Tove in particular retained a close connection, only leaving the house at age 28.

Tove has written that she felt her mother understood her better than anyone else and even toward the end of her life, Tove "always tried to resemble [her] Mother, always tried to draw like [her] Mother." In 1928, at age 14, Tove noted that "Mother has important drawing work. (...) I am waiting for the time when I will be able to help her with her drawings. Mother does so much work by herself." Hammarsten-Jansson's death in 1970 profoundly impacted her daughter's writing and it has been suggested that her presence is strongly felt in a number of the books Tove wrote after the death. The melancholic Moominvalley in November (1970) deals with themes of leaving and loneliness, and is typically considered the most mature of the Moomin series. The Summer Book (1972) concerns a young girl whose mother has died and her relationship with her grandmother. Hammarsten-Jansson's death marked the end of the Moomin series of novels and Jansson's literary output became primarily adult-oriented.
