= Emil Jensen (musician) =

Musical artist

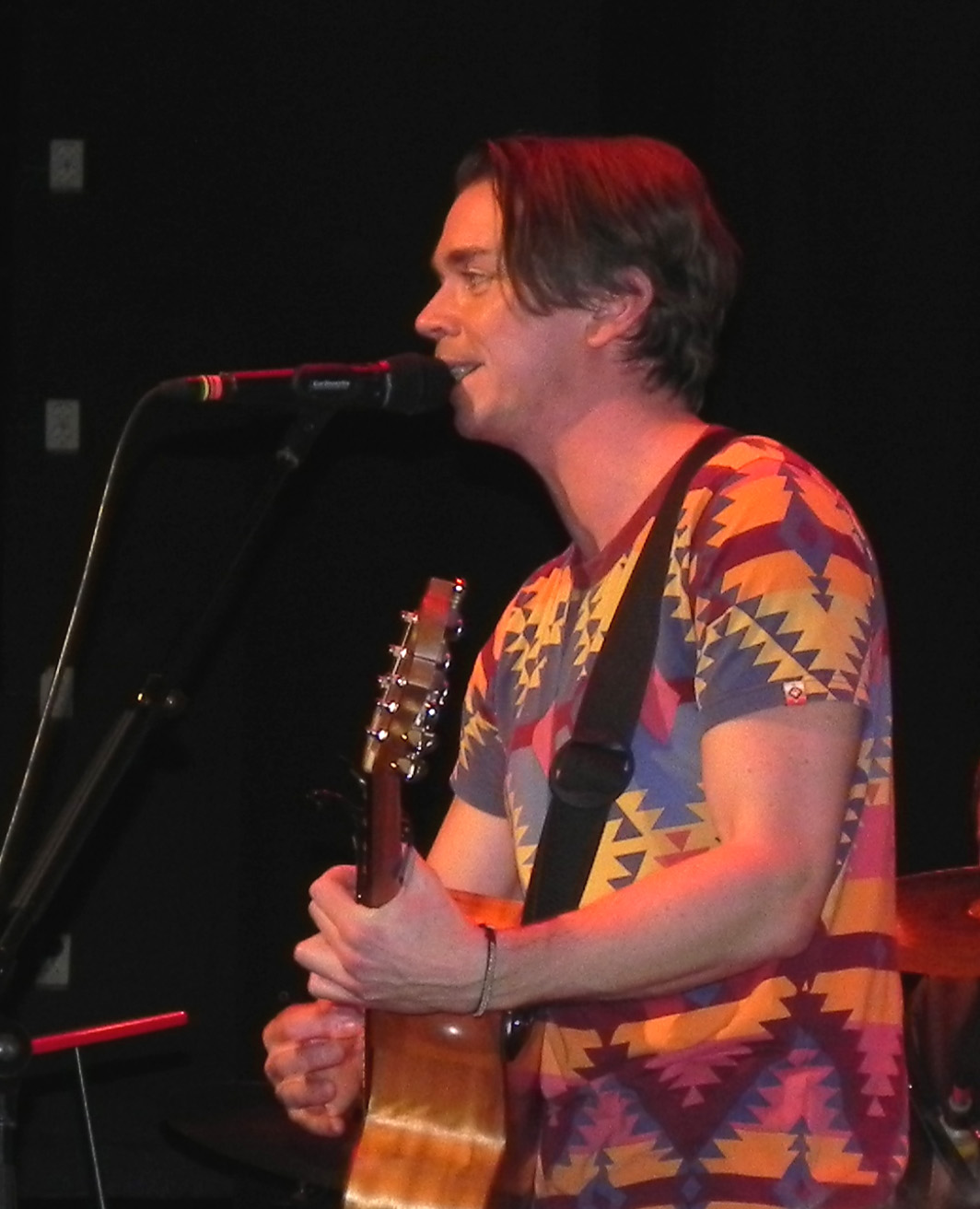
- Emil Jensen at Victoria Theatre.

Background information
- Origin: Hjärup, Skåne, Sweden
- Genres: Spoken Word; Singer-Songwriter
- Years active: 2004–present
- Labels: Adrian Recordings
- Website: Official website

Emil Jensen is a Swedish singer-songwriter, comedian and actor based in Sweden. Emil Jensen has outspoken environmentalist views. In 2007, he toured Sweden by bicycle. He has also made a tour by train. The latter was also made into a film, 300 eMil. In 2008, he starred in the Swedish drama Everlasting Moments which was his debut as an actor. Jensen has made 4 albums: Kom hem som nån annan (2004), Orka då (2006), his self-titled album in 2008, and the recently released Rykten (2011).

== Discography ==
=== Albums ===
Year	Album	Peak positions	Certification
Year	Album	SWE	Certification
2008	Emil Jensen	35	
2011	Rykten	42	
2013	I det nya landet	41	
