= Lars Jansson (cartoonist) =

Finnish author and cartoonist (1926–2000)

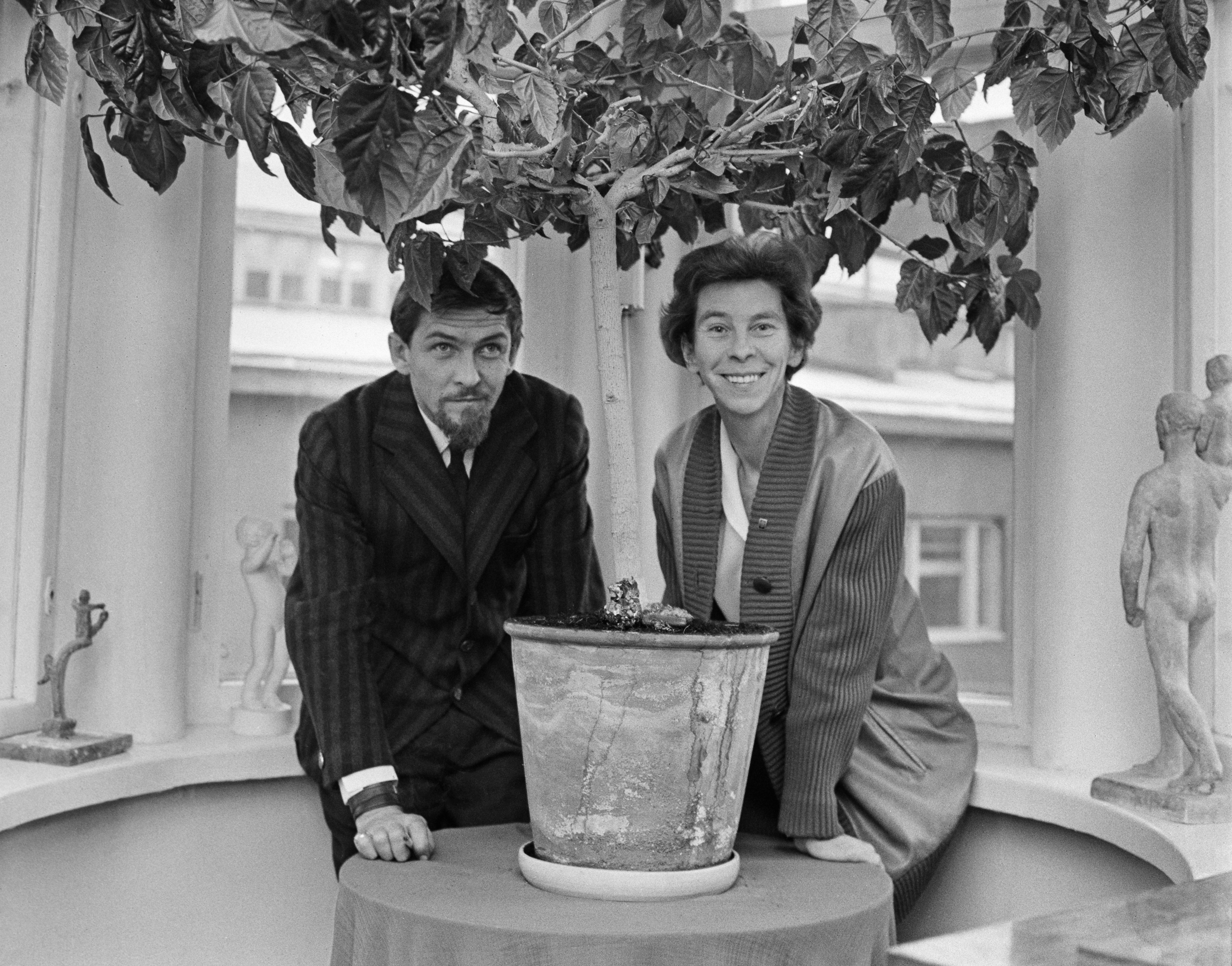
Siblings Lars and Tove Jansson in 1963.

Lars Fredrik Jansson (8 October 1926, Helsinki – 31 July 2000, Helsinki) was a Swedish-speaking Finnish author and cartoonist.

== Early life ==
A native of Helsinki, Jansson was the son of a sculptor, Viktor Bernhard Jansson, and a Swedish-born illustrator, Signe Hammarsten-Jansson. His siblings included an older sister, writer Tove Jansson, and an older brother, photographer Per Olov Jansson. He graduated from Tölö Svenska Samskola in 1944. From 1961 to 1968, Jansson was married to Anita Lesch. He made a study trip to Spain where he lived from 1962 to 1966.

== Work ==
In 1957, he began working with his sister on the writing and drawing of the Moomin comic strip, which he produced single-handedly from 1959 to 1975. Between 1990 and 1992, Jansson worked with Dennis Livson to develop the concept of the Moomin animated series in Japan. His daughter, Sophia, worked together with him in 1993 to help manage the production of a new series of Moomin strips which Sophia now manages solely.
