= Zaida Bergroth =

Finnish film director

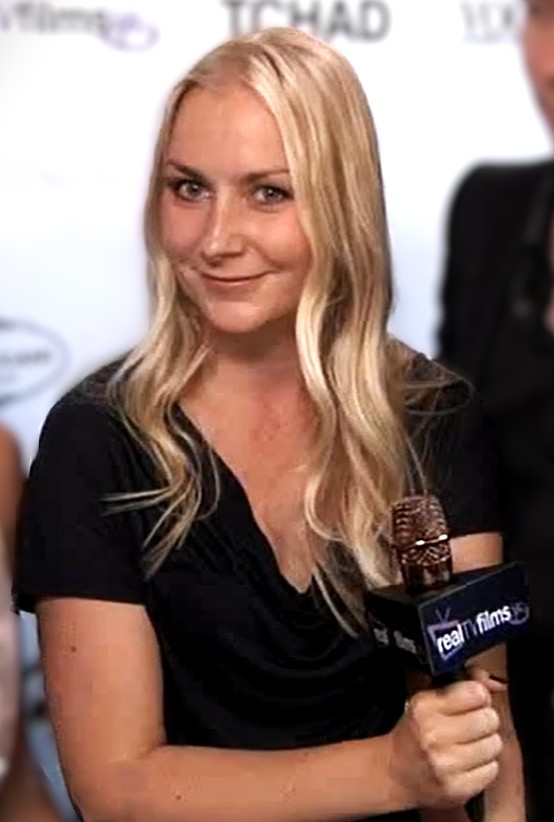
Bergroth in 2011

Zaida Bergroth (born 8 February 1977) is a Finnish film director best known for her 2020 film Tove.

== Personal Life and Career ==
Bergroth was born in Kivijärvi in 1977. She graduated from the Aalto University School of Arts, Design and Architecture in 2004. Her first feature, Last Cowboy Standing was released in 2009. In 2019 it was announced that she would direct a biopic on the Moomin author Tove Jansson, titled Tove, which was released in 2020.

In February 2025 Bergroth was set to direct a biopic of Marianne Faithfull named Faithfull.

== Selected filmography ==
- Hair (1999) (short) (writer and director)
- Lasileuka [Glass Jaw] (2004) (short) (writer and director)
- Heavy Metal (2007) (short) (writer and director)
- Kunnanjohtaja (2007) (short) (writer and director)
- Last Cowboy Standing (2009) (screenplay and director)
- The Good Son (2011) (writer and director)
- Miami (2017) (writer and director)
- Maria’s Paradise (2019) (director)
- Tove (2020) (director)
- Kristal (2020) (short) (writer and director)

== Personal life ==
Bergroth has a sister, writer Aina Bergroth, and her mother is the painter Marjatta Tapiola.

== See also ==
- List of female film and television directors
- List of LGBT-related films directed by women
