= The Summer Book =

1972 novel by Tove Jansson

- Author: Tove Jansson
- Original title: Sommarboken
- Illustrator: Tove Jansson
- Language: Swedish
- Genre: Novel
- Publisher: Bonnier
- Publication date: 1972
- Publication place: Finland
- English publication date: 1975
- Pages: 192
- ISBN: 978-9-1004-7282-5
- Followed by: Sun City

The Summer Book (Swedish: Sommarboken) is a novel written by the Finland Swedish author Tove Jansson in 1972. It tells of a family silently mourning a mother's death while spending a summer on a tiny island in the Gulf of Finland; the main characters are a young girl, Sophia, and her grandmother.

The novel has been praised for its lightness of touch, simplicity of language, and expressiveness, while dealing indirectly with its principal theme of death. It has been translated into many languages, including Thomas Teal's admired English version. The author Richard Rayner has described it as Jansson's best book for adults. The work has been adapted for the stage in 2023, and as a film by Charlie McDowell starring Glenn Close in 2024.

== Plot ==
An elderly woman, her six-year-old granddaughter Sophia, and Sophia's father spend a summer together on a tiny island in the Gulf of Finland exploring, talking about life, nature, everything but their feelings about Sophia's mother's death and their love for one another. Each chapter narrates an episode, such as about a cat; a cave; a dressing-gown; a visiting girlfriend of Sophia's with beautiful hair, who grandmother decides to call Berenice; or a group of villains in a luxury yacht.

== Analysis ==
=== In Scandinavia ===
Ida Fellman, for the Finnish national broadcaster Yle, comments that Tove Jansson's writing in the novel is crystal-clear and unsentimental. She describes the intergenerational friendship between Sophia and her grandmother, which could be sentimental, except that both characters are contrary and temperamental.

Em Lugnet, in Västerbottens-Kuriren, writes that she reads The Summer Book every summer, discovering something new every time. Re-reading the book, the 'Dressing Gown' chapter struck her and stayed with her for months. The dressing gown now seemed to symbolise sorrow, and the attic where it was stored seemed to be a store of memories, shared between Sophia, father, and grandmother but processed differently in each case. Sorrow can't, she writes, be packed away in a box, but requires an environment where it has room to be transformed.

=== In the English-speaking world ===
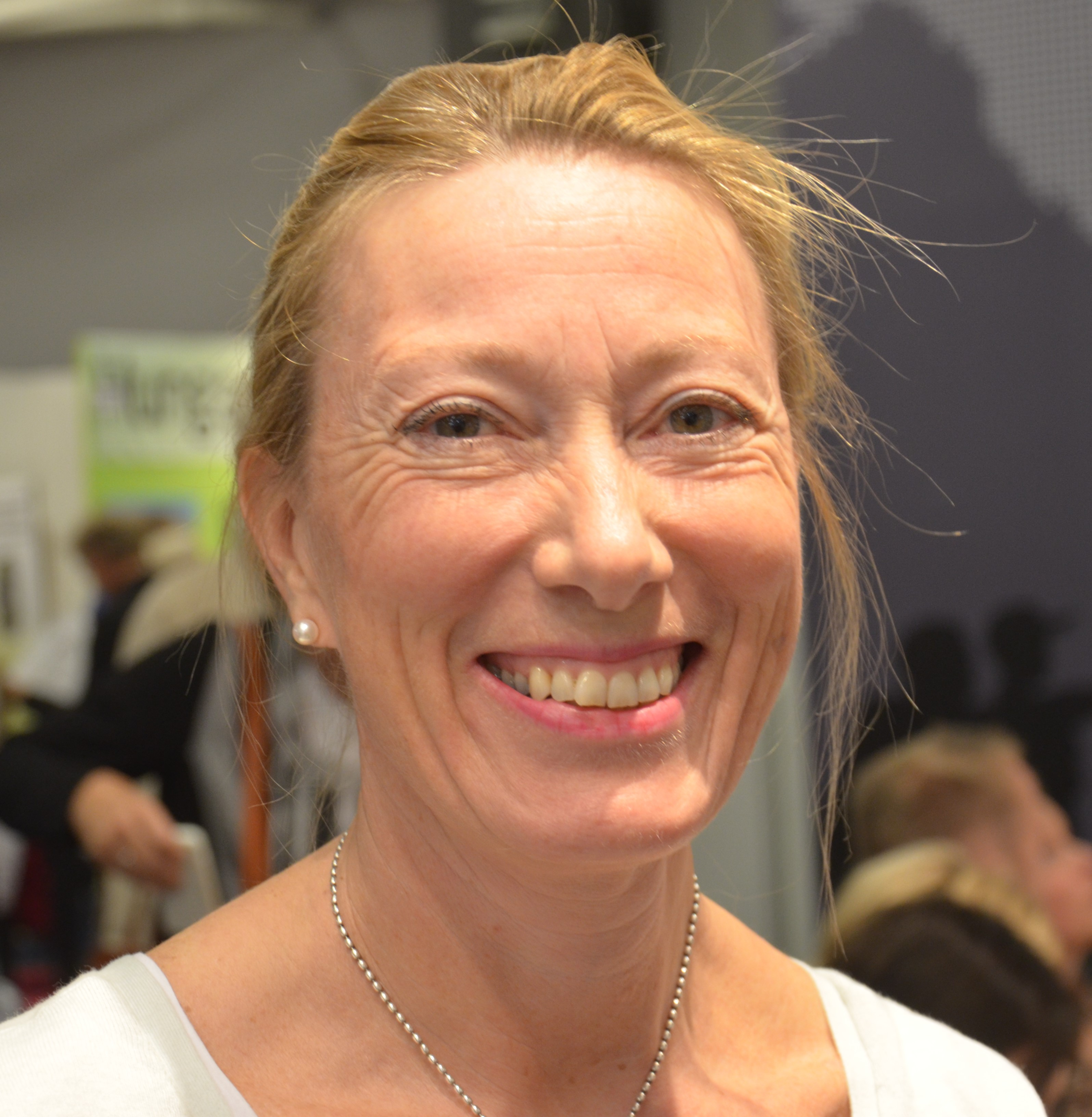
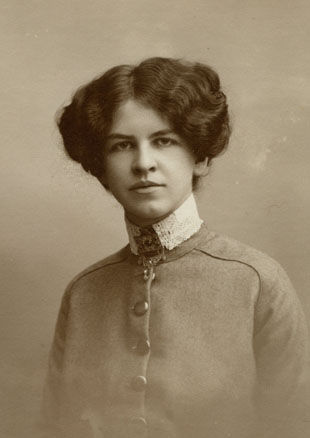
Sophia Jansson (left), Tove's niece, was the model for the child, while Signe Hammarsten-Jansson, Tove's mother, was the model for the grandmother.

The novelist Ali Smith, reviewing the book in The Guardian, wrote that Jansson was better known for her Moomin books than for her novels, and that with her worldwide fame, she knew the "virtues of withdrawal". In Smith's view, The Summer Book is an astonishing achievement of artistry, "the writing so lightly kept, so simple-seeming, so closely concerned with the weighing of moments that any extra weight of exegesis is too much." Telling the tale of the child and her grandmother in the simplest language, Smith writes, "The threat of brevity, even on this timeless island in this timeless, gorgeous summer, is very marked. But Jansson's brilliance is to create a narrative that seems, at least, to have no forward motion, to exist in lit moments, gleaming dark moments, like lights on a string, each chapter its own beautifully constructed, random-seeming, complete story. Her writing is all magical deception, her sentences simple and loaded; the novel reads like looking through clear water and seeing, suddenly, the depth." Smith praises Thomas Teal's English translation as "original and stunning".

Lucy Knight, celebrating the book's 50th anniversary in The Guardian, quotes Smith's description of The Summer Book, "a masterpiece of microcosm, a perfection of the small, quiet read". Knight adds that Sophia Jansson – Tove's niece and the real-life model for the character of the granddaughter Sophia – thinks that Tove was "poking fun" at what people consider normal. In her view, the island allowed the Janssons, like the book's characters, to shape their own sort of "normality"; tolerance and care for nature were to them essential virtues. Signe Hammarsten-Jansson – Sophia's grandmother, Jansson's mother – was likewise the real-life model for the character of Sophia's grandmother.

The author Richard Rayner, writing in the Los Angeles Times, calls the novel the best of Jansson's books for adults, "more meditative and melancholy" than her Moomin books. He describes the incidents as "strung together like beads on a thread, each one strong and clear. Some chapters function almost like self-contained short stories, yet the whole adds up, radiant with life and life's mystery, and showing how the relationship between youth and age might achieve a frankness and open honesty rarely permitted by the more intimate parental bond." In his view, the underlying theme is death, "death awaited, death endured, death raged against and not understood." The novel mentions, just once, that Sophia's mother has recently died; Rayner quotes Sophia's nightmare in which a channel opens in the floor and all their bags float away and are lost; she wakes grandmother to check if the door is locked, and grandmother reassures her that it's quite safe: the door is always unlocked. Rayner comments that Jansson embraces the world "even if it smacks you back." He likens Jansson to Raymond Carver, the very different authors both writing with minute observation, "imbu[ing] the physical world with immense poetic power." Rayner describes Jansson's cover image, like the text, as perfect.

The journalist Antonia Windsor described it as "like a meditation on life and love and surviving in the natural world. It is a wonderfully humane and gentle book." The New York Review of Books writes that Jansson's characters, the girl and her grandmother, "discuss things that matter to young and old alike: life, death, the nature of God and of love." In its view, Jansson "creates her own complete world, full of the varied joys and sorrows of life." The novelist Philip Pullman described the book as "a marvelous, beautiful, wise novel, which is also very funny."

== Translations and adaptations ==
Sommarboken was first published, unillustrated, in Swedish by Bonnier in 1972. They brought out the first illustrated edition with 16 of Jansson's ink drawings in 1976. The novel has been translated into languages including English, Finnish, French, German, Greek, Slovenian, Spanish, and Turkish.

Charlie McDowell's film adaptation of the book, starring Glenn Close as the grandmother, was released in 2024. Close's performance was praised by critics.

A theatre version was staged in Stockholm's Kulturhuset Stadsteatern in 2023. Maina Arvas wrote in Dagens Nyheter that the rather tame production, starring Marika Lagercrantz and Matilda Ragnerstam, made the audience long for something a little more risky.

== See also ==
- Moominpappa at Sea – a children's book by Jansson thought by critics to have similar psychological depth
- Notes from an Island – a non-fiction book about Jansson's real life on the island of Klovharun

== Sources ==
- Jansson, Tove (1985) [1976]. Sommarboken (Illustrated ed.). Bonnier Pocket. ISBN 978-9100472825.
