= The Summer Book (film) =

2024 drama film by Charlie McDowell

- Swedish theatrical release poster
- Directed by: Charlie McDowell
- Written by: Robert Jones
- Based on: The Summer Book by Tove Jansson
- Produced by: Aleksi Bardy; Kevin Loader; Kath Mattock; Charlie McDowell; Duncan Montgomery; Alex Orlovsky; Helen Vinogradov
- Starring: Glenn Close; Emily Matthews; Anders Danielsen Lie
- Cinematography: Sturla Brandth Grøvlen
- Edited by: Jussi Rautaniemi
- Music by: Hania Rani
- Production companies: Free Range Films; Stille Productions; High Frequency Entertainment; Helsinki Filmi
- Distributed by: SF Studios (Finland); Music Box Films (United States)
- Release dates: 12 October 2024 (BFI); 31 January 2025 (Finland); 19 September 2025 (United States)
- Running time: 90 minutes
- Countries: United Kingdom; United States; Finland
- Language: English
- Box office: $2 million

The Summer Book is a 2024 drama film directed by Charlie McDowell, written by Robert Jones, and starring Glenn Close, Emily Matthews, and Anders Danielsen Lie. It is based on Tove Jansson's 1972 novel of the same title. A co-production of the United Kingdom, the United States, and Finland, the film premiered at the BFI London Film Festival on 12 October 2024.

== Premise ==
Sophia spends the summer with her father and grandmother on a small island in the Gulf of Finland, as the family grapples with the recent death of Sophia's mother.

== Cast ==
- Glenn Close as Grandmother
- Emily Matthews as Sophia
- Anders Danielsen Lie as Father
- Ingvar Sigurdsson as Eriksson
- Pekka Strang as Mr. Malander
- Sophia Heikkilä as Mrs. Malander

== Production ==
In March 2023, it was announced that Close and Lie were cast in the film. The film was shot in the summer of 2023 in Finland, in the archipelagos of Kotka, Porvoo and Espoo located in the Gulf of Finland.

In July that same year, it was announced that the filmmakers were granted an interim agreement by SAG-AFTRA to allow production to occur since the 2023 SAG-AFTRA strike was occurring at the time.

== Release ==
The Summer Book premiered at the BFI London Film Festival on 12 October 2024. The North American theatrical debut was at the AFI Fest on 27 October 2024 in Hollywood, California. The DVD, distributed by Music Box Films, has audio and subtitles in English only.

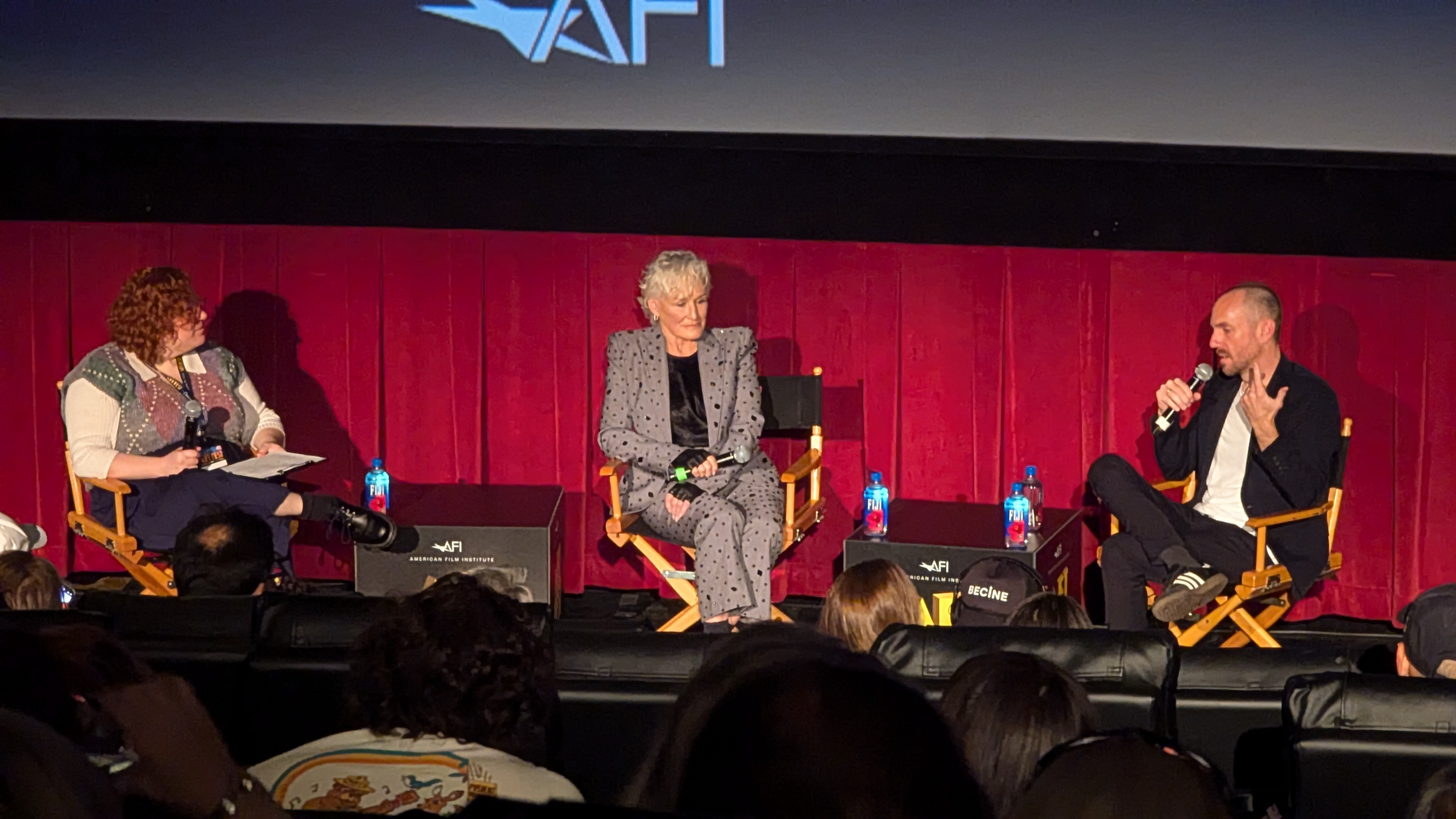
Glenn Close and Charlie McDowell at the North American release of The Summer Book on 27 October 2024.

Its distribution rights in the Nordic countries are held by SF Studios, which is set to release it in Finland on 31 January 2025.

The Summer Book was one of 15 films shortlisted out of 1,794 feature film submissions for the Tiantan Award as part of official selection of the Beijing International Film Festival.

The Summer Book premiered in cinemas in Jansson's native Finland on January 31, 2025, and was the number one film at the Finnish box office during its opening weekend. By March, film tickets in the country had surpassed 100,000. In July 2025, Music Box Films acquired US distribution rights to the film, and released it on September 19, 2025.

== Reception ==
The Summer Book holds an 83% approval rating on review aggregator website Rotten Tomatoes, based on 40 critic reviews. Critics have called the film "light in story but heavy in mood" and an "evocative drama that finds life in death and death in life", while also describing it as "infinitely gentle" and "an appealing throwback to old-fashioned family dramas of a more innocent era."

Glenn Close's performance has received particular acclaim. IndieWire described Close as "the film's secret weapon" while The Hollywood Reporter praised her "finely etched characterization" and Variety noted that, "attentive to characterful details of accent and posture, Close plays this tender-tough old bird beautifully."
