= 66th Golden Globe Awards =

Film award ceremony in 2009

- Date: January 11, 2009
- Site: Beverly Hilton Hotel; Beverly Hills, Los Angeles, California

Highlights
- Best Film: Drama: Slumdog Millionaire
- Best Film: Musical or Comedy: Vicky Cristina Barcelona
- Best Drama Series: Mad Men
- Best Musical or Comedy Series: 30 Rock
- Best Miniseries or Television movie: John Adams
- Most awards: (4) Slumdog Millionaire
- Most nominations: (5) The Curious Case of Benjamin Button; Doubt; Frost/Nixon

Television coverage
- Network: NBC

The 66th Golden Globe Awards, honoring the best in film and television of 2008, was broadcast on January 11, 2009, from the Beverly Hilton Hotel in Beverly Hills, California, United States on the NBC television network. The broadcast was watched by approximately 14.6 million viewers with a rating of 4.9/12. The ceremony returned after the previous year's ceremony was canceled due to the Writers Guild of America strike. The nominations were announced on December 12, 2008.

== Winners and nominees ==
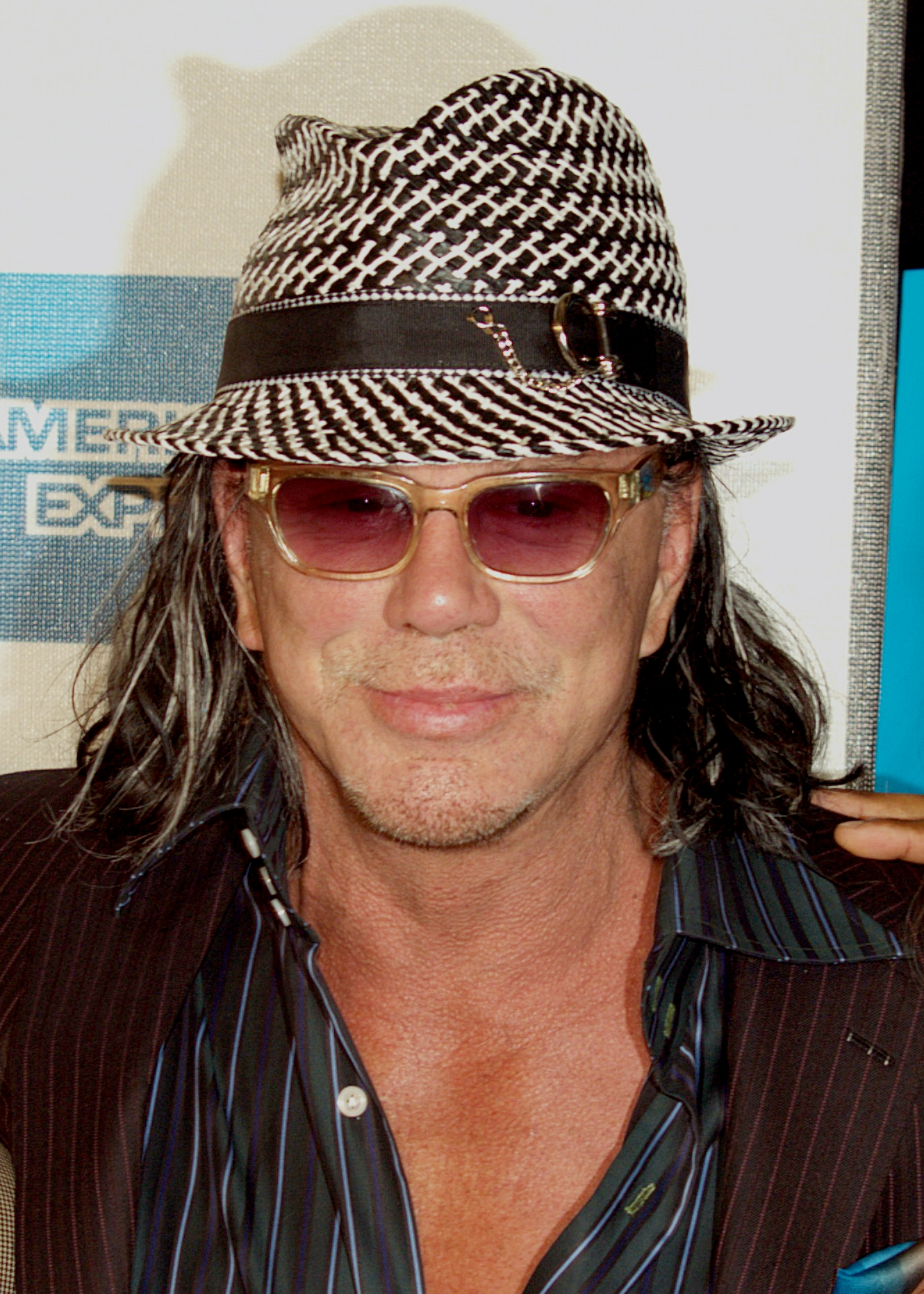
Mickey Rourke, Best Actor in a Motion Picture – Drama winner

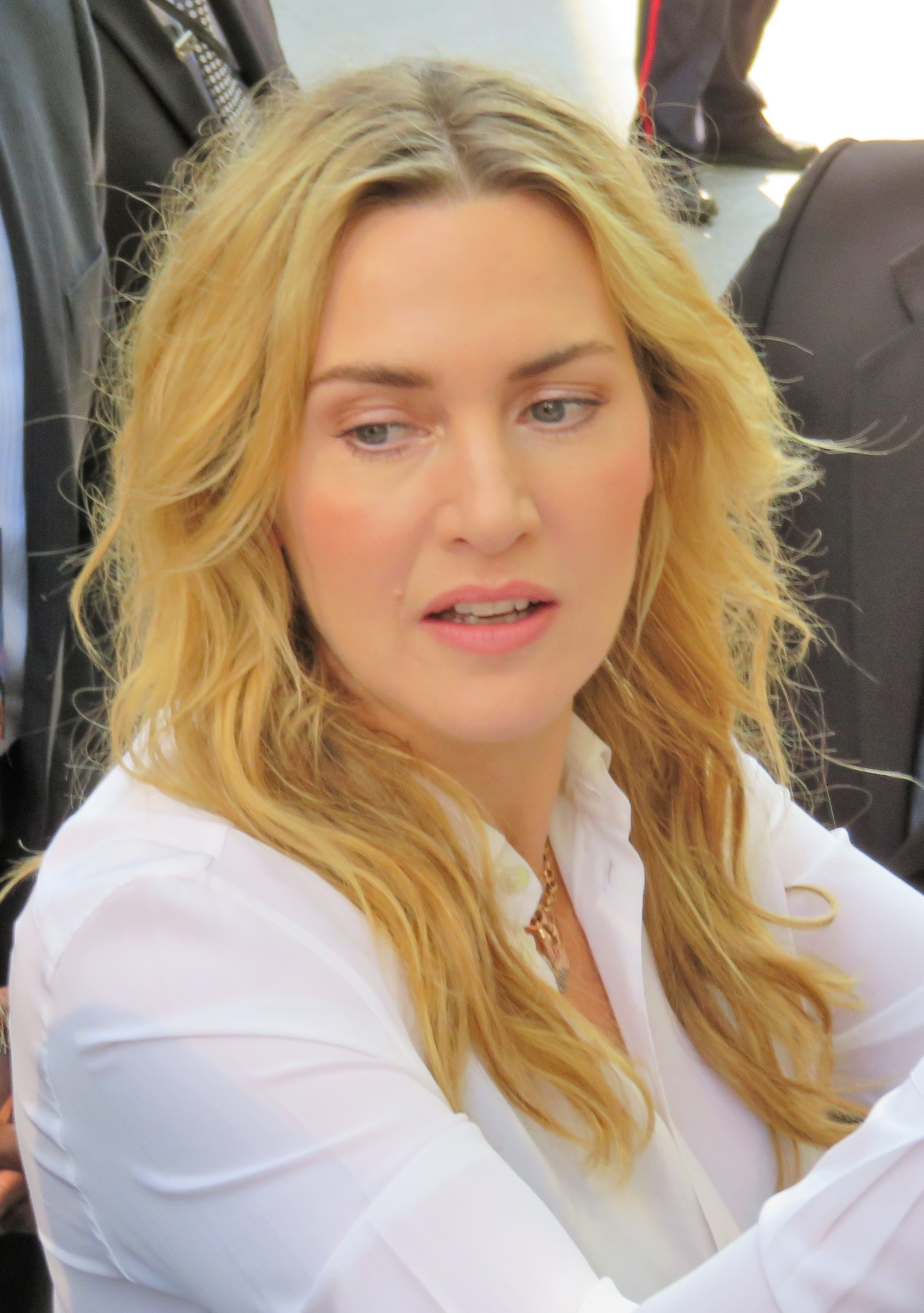
Kate Winslet, Best Actress in a Motion Picture – Drama and Best Supporting Actress winner

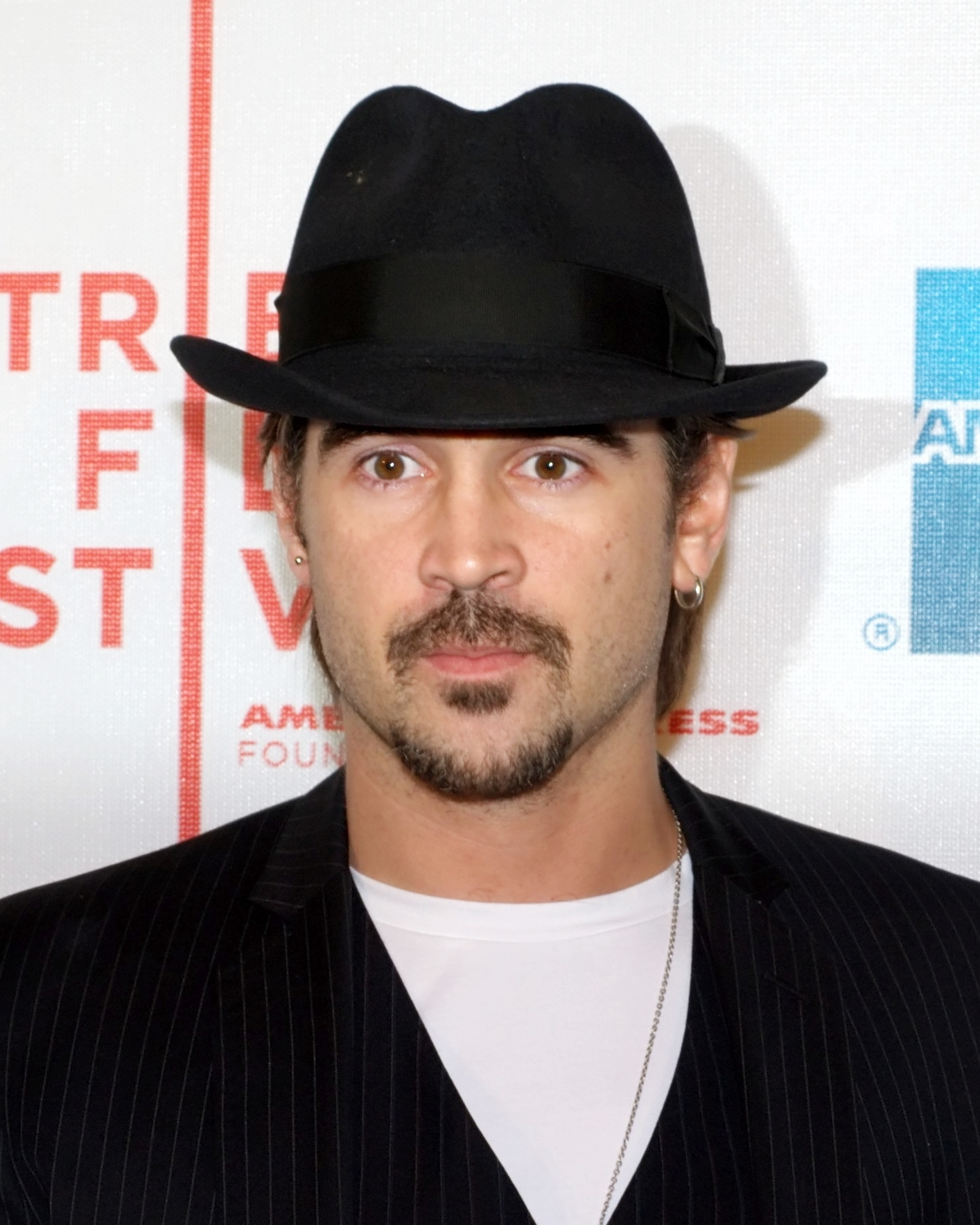
Colin Farrell, Best Actor in a Motion Picture – Musical or Comedy winner

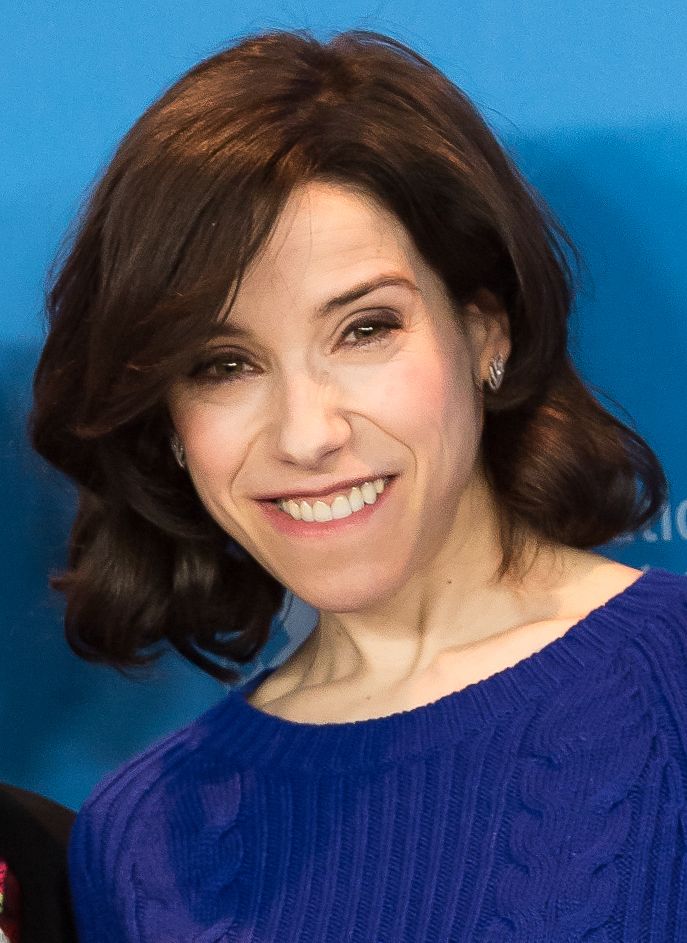
Sally Hawkins, Best Actress in a Motion Picture – Musical or Comedy winner

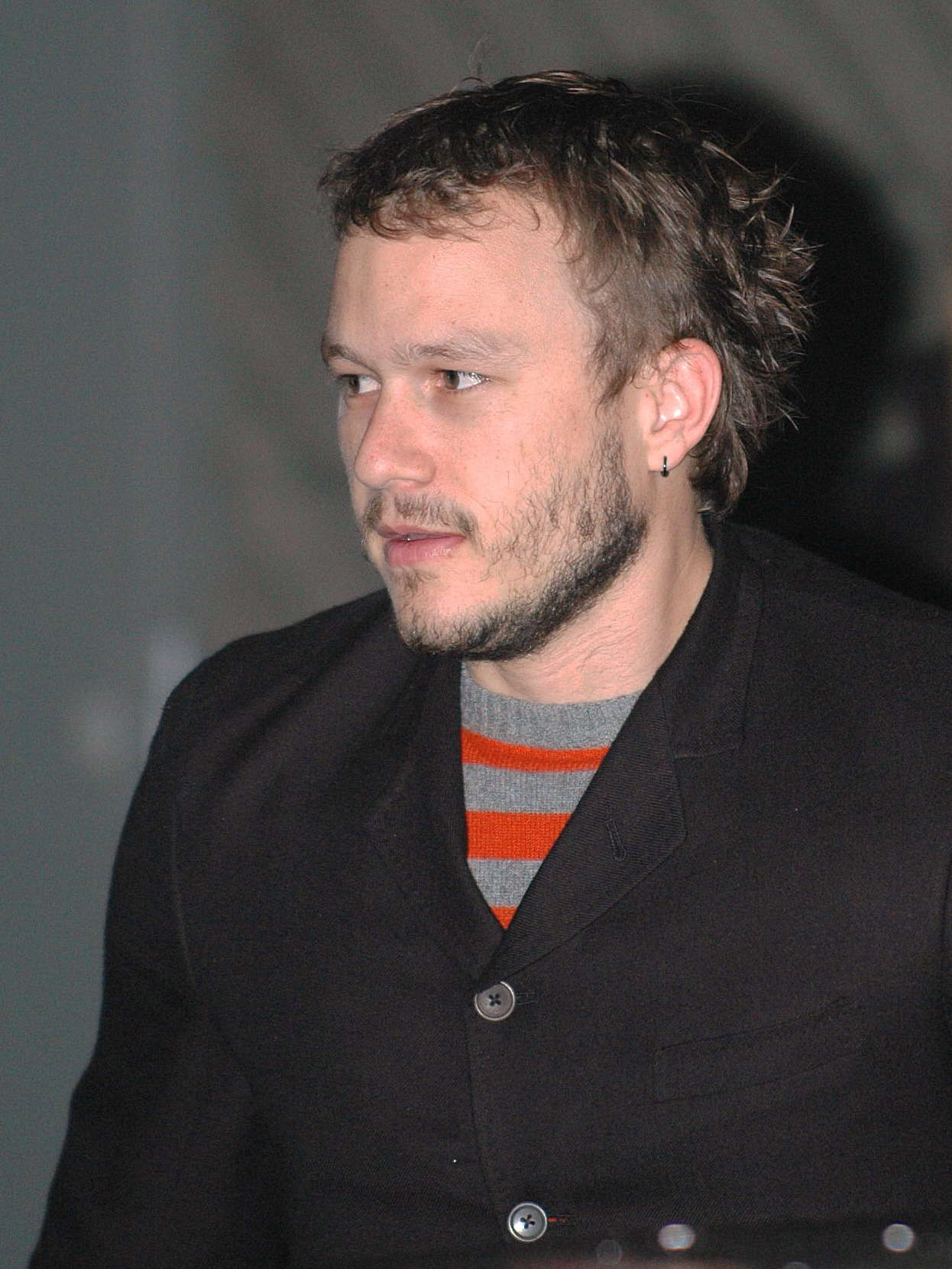
Heath Ledger, Best Supporting Actor winner

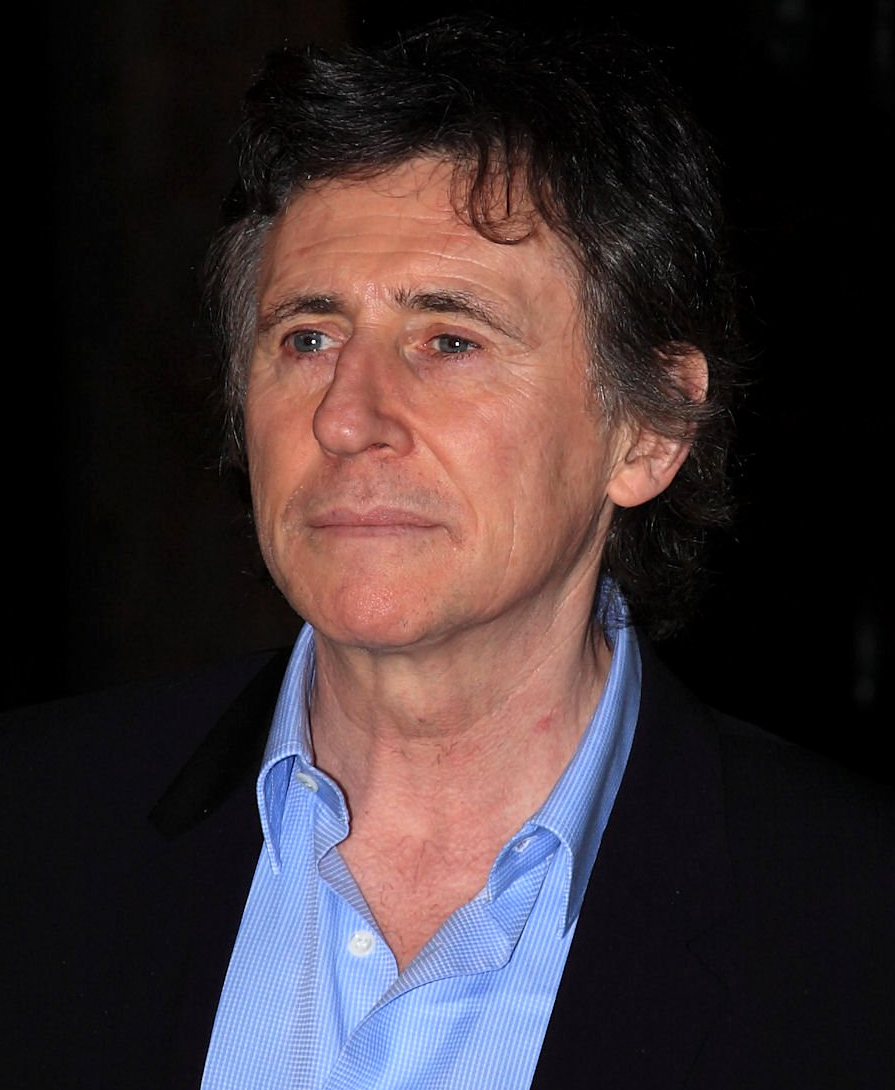
Gabriel Byrne, Best Actor in a Television Series – Drama winner

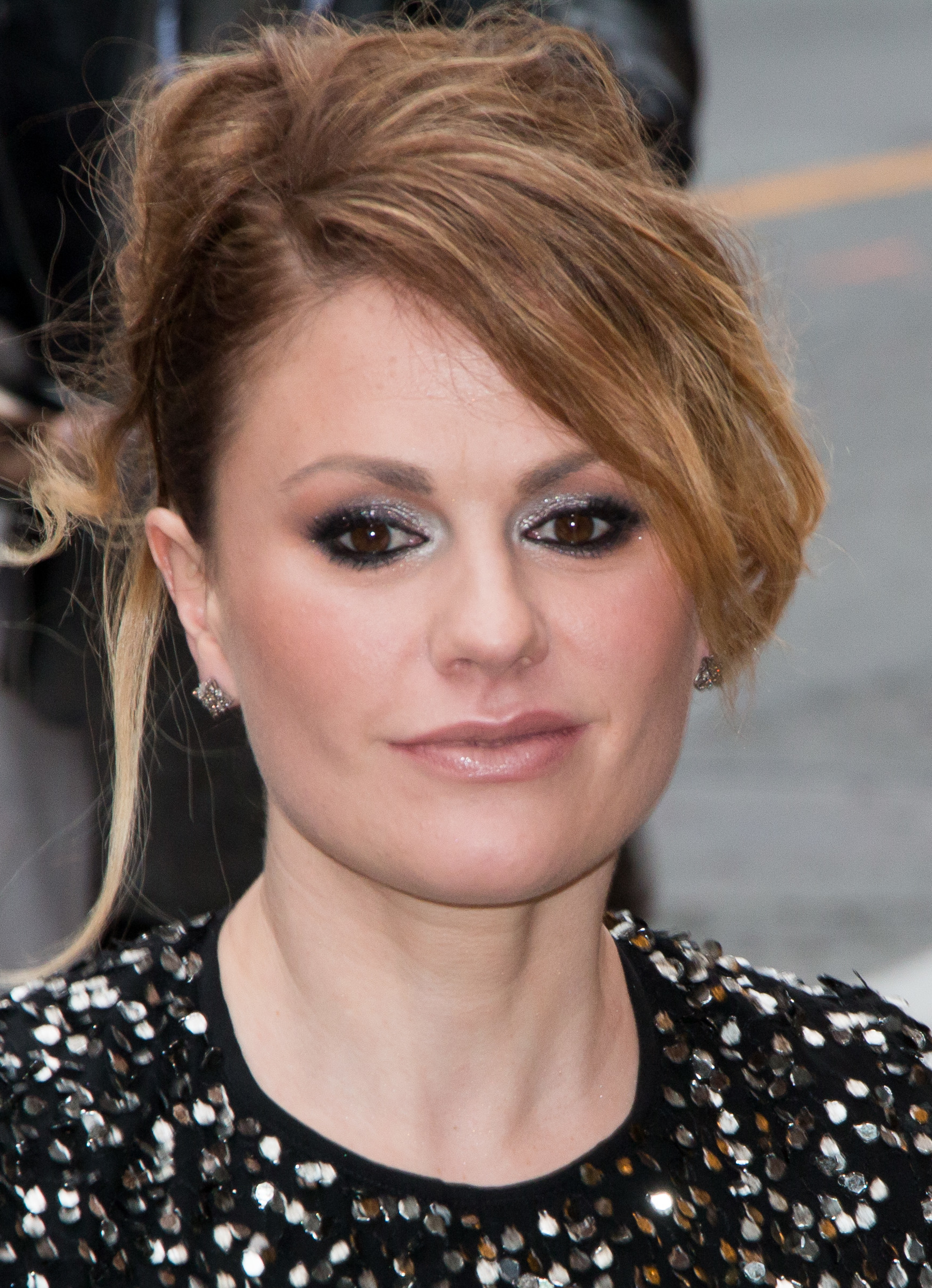
Anna Paquin, Best Actress in a Television Series – Drama winner

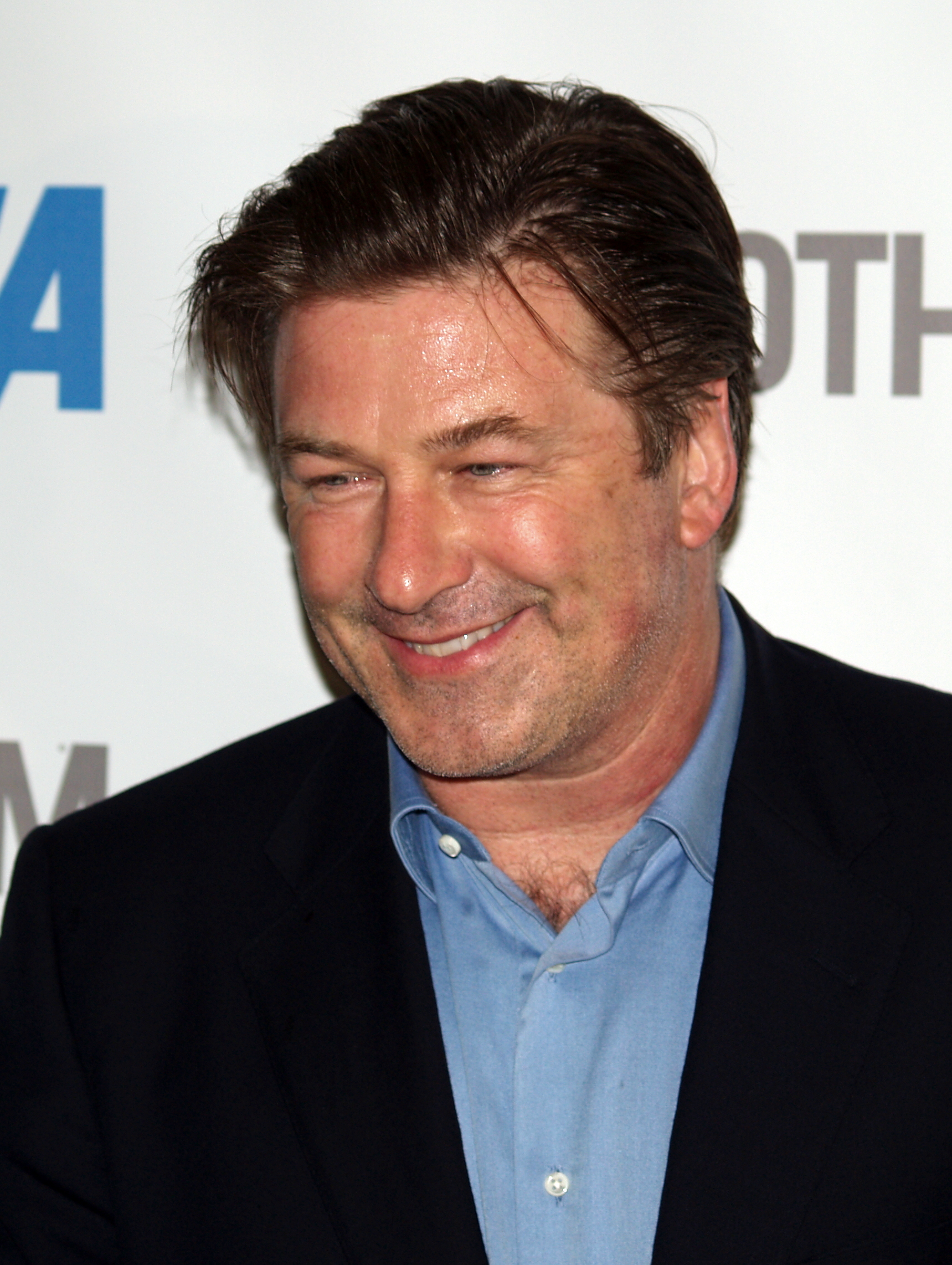
Alec Baldwin, Best Actor in a Television Series – Musical or Comedy winner

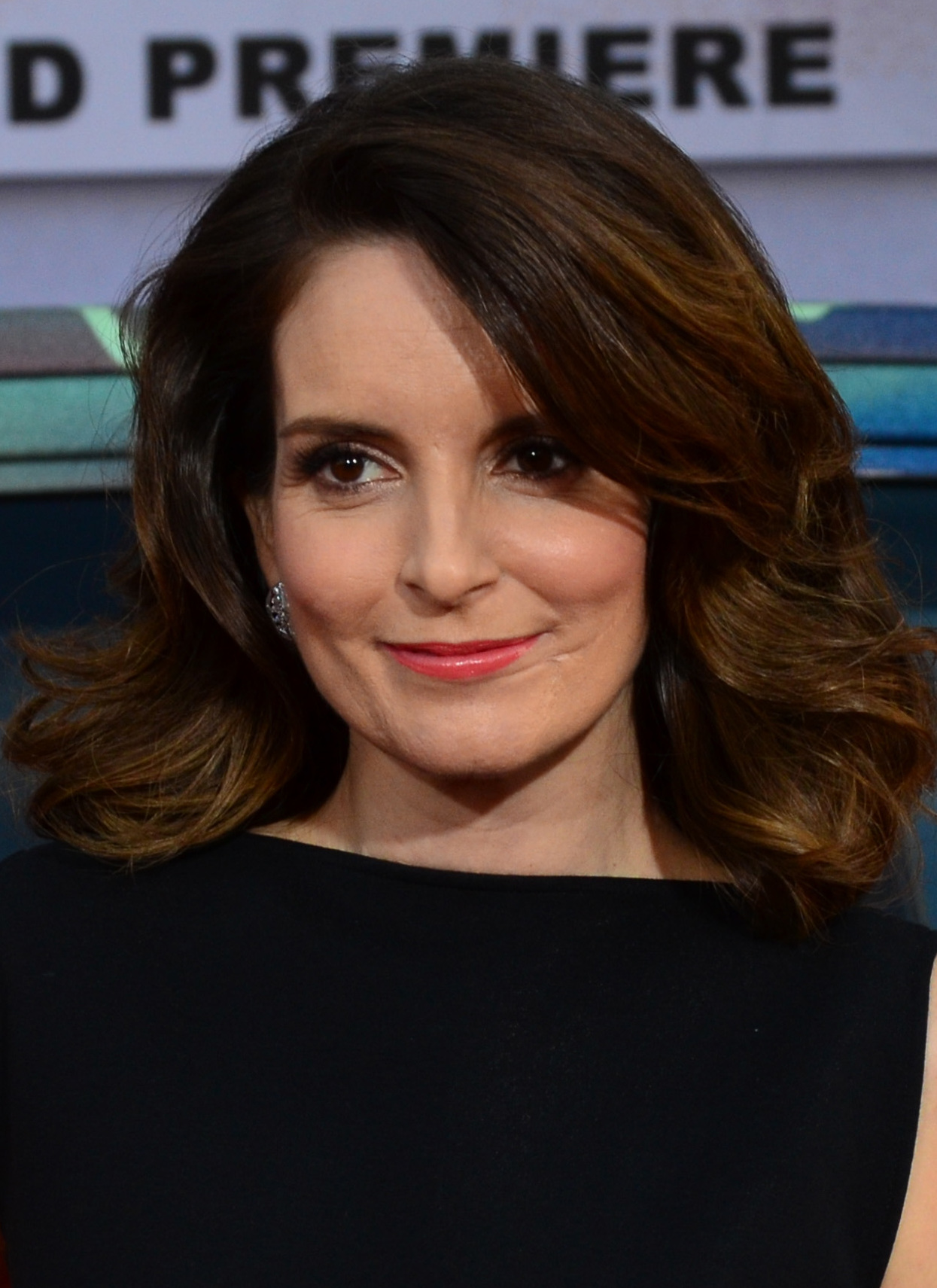
Tina Fey, Best Actress in a Television Series – Musical or Comedy winner

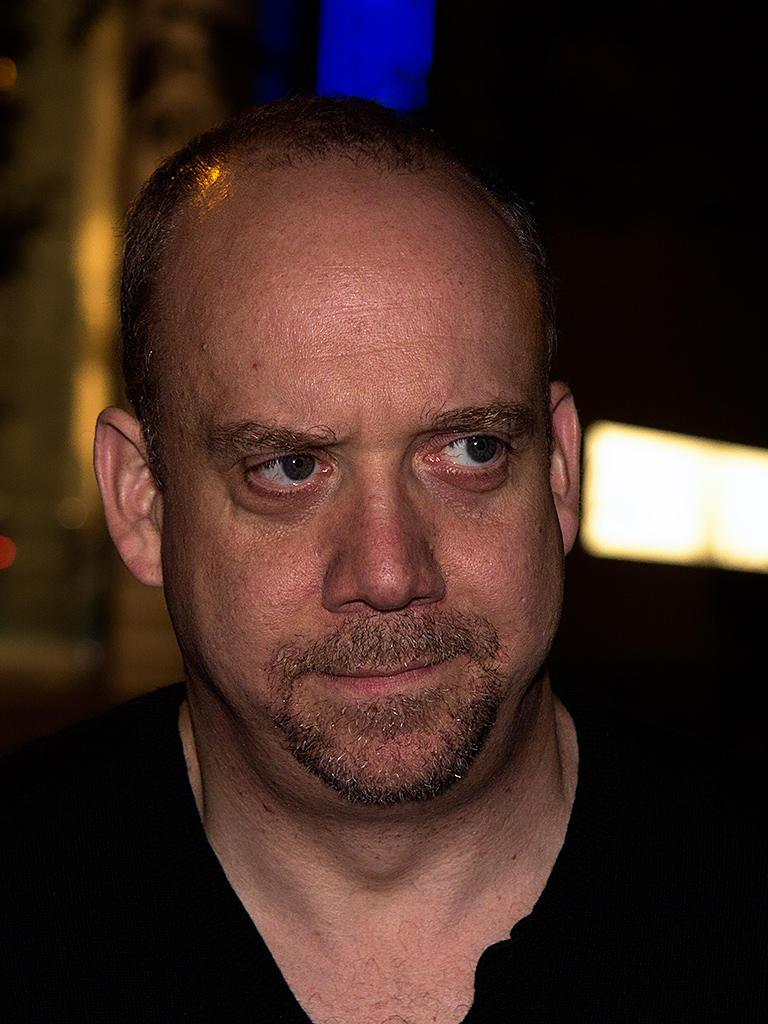
Paul Giamatti, Best Actor in a Miniseries or Television Film winner

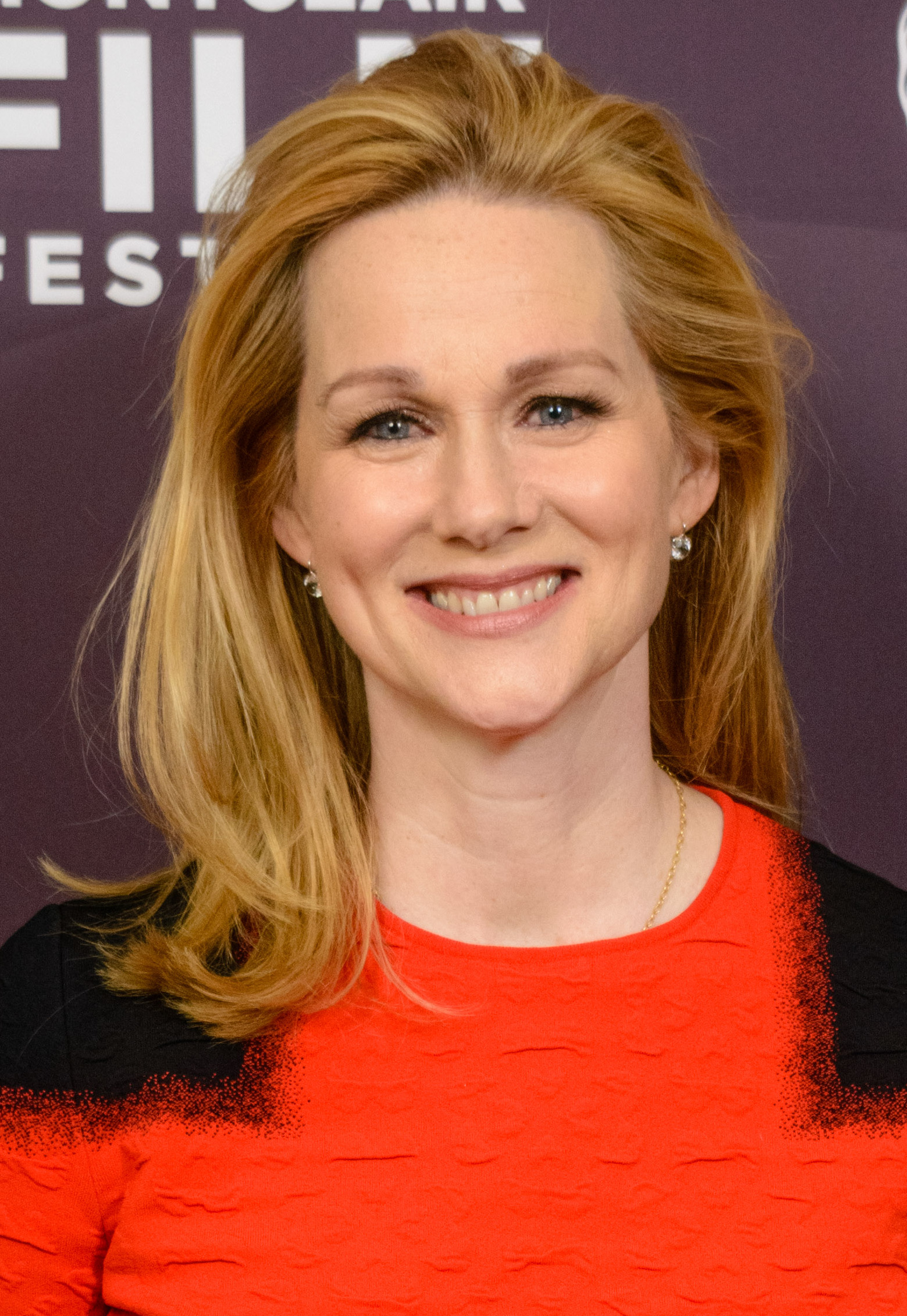
Laura Linney, Best Actress in a Miniseries or Television Film winner

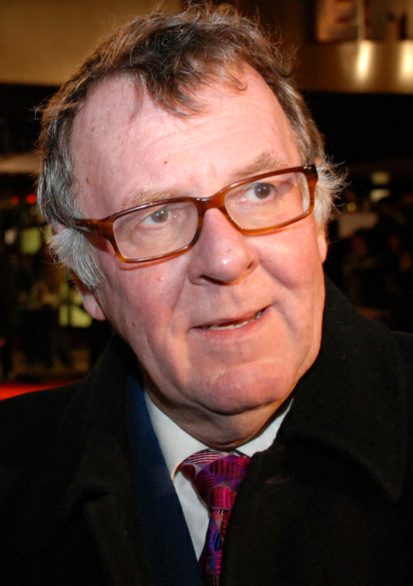
Tom Wilkinson, Best Supporting Actor in a Series, Miniseries, or Television Film winner

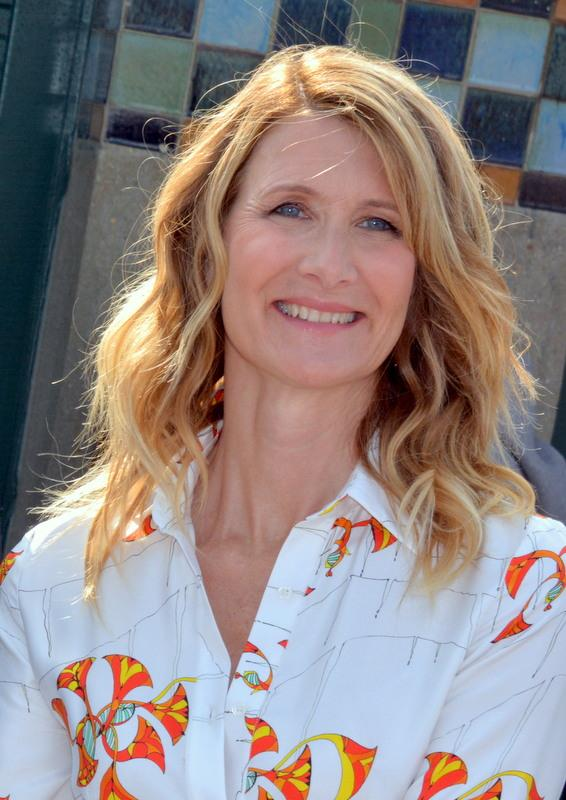
Laura Dern, Best Supporting Actress in a Series, Miniseries, or Television Film winner

These are the nominees for the 66th Golden Globe Awards. Winners are listed at the top of each list.

=== Film ===
Best Motion Picture
Drama	Musical or Comedy
Slumdog Millionaire; The Curious Case of Benjamin Button; Frost/Nixon; The Reader; Revolutionary Road	Vicky Cristina Barcelona; Burn After Reading; Happy-Go-Lucky; In Bruges; Mamma Mia!
Acting
Best Performance by an Actor in a Motion Picture – Drama	Best Performance by an Actress in a Motion Picture – Drama
Mickey Rourke – The Wrestler as Randy "The Ram" Robinson; Leonardo DiCaprio – Revolutionary Road as Frank Wheeler; Frank Langella – Frost/Nixon as Richard Nixon; Brad Pitt – The Curious Case of Benjamin Button as Benjamin Button; Sean Penn – Milk as Harvey Milk	Kate Winslet – Revolutionary Road as April Wheeler; Anne Hathaway – Rachel Getting Married as Kym; Angelina Jolie – Changeling as Christine Collins; Meryl Streep – Doubt as Sister Aloysius Beauvier; Kristin Scott Thomas – I've Loved You So Long (Il y a longtemps que je t'aime) as Juliette Fontaine
Best Performance by an Actor in a Motion Picture – Musical or Comedy	Best Performance by an Actress in a Motion Picture – Musical or Comedy
Colin Farrell – In Bruges as Ray; Javier Bardem – Vicky Cristina Barcelona as Juan Antonio Gonzalo; James Franco – Pineapple Express as Saul Silver; Brendan Gleeson – In Bruges as Ken; Dustin Hoffman – Last Chance Harvey as Harvey Shine	Sally Hawkins – Happy-Go-Lucky as Pauline "Poppy" Cross; Rebecca Hall – Vicky Cristina Barcelona as Vicky; Frances McDormand – Burn After Reading as Linda Litzke; Meryl Streep – Mamma Mia! as Donna Sheridan; Emma Thompson – Last Chance Harvey as Kate Walker
Best Performance by an Actor in a Supporting Role in a Motion Picture	Best Performance by an Actress in a Supporting Role in a Motion Picture
Heath Ledger – The Dark Knight as The Joker (posthumous); Tom Cruise – Tropic Thunder as Les Grossman; Robert Downey Jr. – Tropic Thunder as Kirk Lazarus; Ralph Fiennes – The Duchess as William Cavendish, 5th Duke of Devonshire; Philip Seymour Hoffman – Doubt as Father Brendan Flynn	Kate Winslet – The Reader as Hanna Schmitz; Amy Adams – Doubt as Sister James; Penélope Cruz – Vicky Cristina Barcelona as María Elena; Viola Davis – Doubt as Mrs. Miller; Marisa Tomei – The Wrestler as Cassidy
Best Director – Motion Picture	Best Screenplay – Motion Picture
Danny Boyle – Slumdog Millionaire; Stephen Daldry – The Reader; David Fincher – The Curious Case of Benjamin Button; Ron Howard – Frost/Nixon; Sam Mendes – Revolutionary Road	Slumdog Millionaire – Simon Beaufoy; The Curious Case of Benjamin Button – Eric Roth; Doubt – John Patrick Shanley; Frost/Nixon – Peter Morgan; The Reader – David Hare
Best Original Song – Motion Picture	Best Original Score – Motion Picture
"The Wrestler" (performed by Bruce Springsteen) – The Wrestler; "Down to Earth" (performed by Peter Gabriel) – WALL-E; "Gran Torino" (performed by Jamie Cullum) – Gran Torino; "I Thought I Lost You" (performed By Miley Cyrus and John Travolta) – Bolt; "Once in a Lifetime" (performed by Beyoncé Knowles) – Cadillac Records	Slumdog Millionaire – A. R. Rahman; Changeling – Clint Eastwood; The Curious Case of Benjamin Button – Alexandre Desplat; Defiance – James Newton Howard; Frost/Nixon – Hans Zimmer
Best Foreign Language Film	Best Animated Feature Film
Waltz with Bashir (Vals im Bashir) • Israel; The Baader Meinhof Complex (Der Baader Meinhof Komplex) • Germany; Everlasting Moments (Maria Larssons eviga ögonblick) • Sweden/Denmark; Gomorrah (Gomorra) • Italy; I've Loved You So Long (Il y a longtemps que je t'aime) • France	WALL-E; Bolt; Kung Fu Panda

=== Television ===
Best Television Series
Drama	Musical or Comedy
Mad Men (AMC); Dexter (Showtime); House (Fox); In Treatment (HBO); True Blood (HBO)	30 Rock (NBC); Californication (Showtime); Entourage (HBO); The Office (NBC); Weeds (Showtime)
Best Performance in a Television Series – Drama
Actor	Actress
Gabriel Byrne – In Treatment (HBO) as Dr. Paul Weston; Michael C. Hall – Dexter (Showtime) as Dexter Morgan; Jon Hamm – Mad Men (AMC) as Don Draper; Hugh Laurie – House (Fox) as Dr. Gregory House; Jonathan Rhys Meyers – The Tudors (Showtime) as Henry VIII of England	Anna Paquin – True Blood (HBO) as Sookie Stackhouse; Sally Field – Brothers & Sisters (ABC) as Nora Walker; Mariska Hargitay – Law & Order: Special Victims Unit (NBC) as Det. Olivia Benson; January Jones – Mad Men (AMC) as Betty Draper; Kyra Sedgwick – The Closer (TNT) as Deputy Chief Brenda Leigh Johnson
Best Performance in a Television Series – Musical or Comedy
Actor	Actress
Alec Baldwin – 30 Rock (NBC) as Jack Donaghy; Steve Carell – The Office (NBC) as Michael Scott; Kevin Connolly – Entourage (HBO) as Eric Murphy; David Duchovny – Californication (Showtime) as Hank Moody; Tony Shalhoub – Monk (USA Network) as Adrian Monk	Tina Fey – 30 Rock (NBC) as Liz Lemon; Christina Applegate – Samantha Who? (ABC) as Samantha "Sam" Newly; America Ferrera – Ugly Betty (ABC) as Betty Suarez; Debra Messing – The Starter Wife (USA Network) as Molly Kagan; Mary-Louise Parker – Weeds (Showtime) as Nancy Botwin
Best Performance in a Miniseries or Television Film
Actor	Actress
Paul Giamatti – John Adams (HBO) as John Adams; Ralph Fiennes – Bernard and Doris (HBO) as Bernard Lafferty; Kevin Spacey – Recount (HBO) as Ron Klain; Kiefer Sutherland – 24: Redemption (Fox) as Jack Bauer; Tom Wilkinson – Recount (HBO) as James Baker	Laura Linney – John Adams (HBO) as Abigail Adams; Catherine Keener – An American Crime (Showtime) as Gertrude Baniszewski; Shirley MacLaine – Coco Chanel (Lifetime) as Coco Chanel; Susan Sarandon – Bernard and Doris (HBO) as Doris Duke; Judi Dench – Cranford (PBS) as Matilda "Matty" Jenkyns
Best Supporting Performance in a Series, Miniseries or Television Film
Supporting Actor	Supporting Actress
Tom Wilkinson – John Adams (HBO) as Benjamin Franklin; Neil Patrick Harris – How I Met Your Mother (CBS) as Barney Stinson; Denis Leary – Recount (HBO) as Michael Whouley; Jeremy Piven – Entourage (HBO) as Ari Gold; Blair Underwood – In Treatment (HBO) as Alex Prince	Laura Dern – Recount (HBO) as Katherine Harris; Eileen Atkins – Cranford (PBS) as Deborah Jenkyns; Melissa George – In Treatment (HBO) as Laura Hill; Rachel Griffiths – Brothers & Sisters (ABC) as Sarah Walker; Dianne Wiest – In Treatment (HBO) as Gina
Best Miniseries or Television Film
John Adams (HBO); Bernard and Doris (HBO); Cranford (PBS); A Raisin in the Sun (ABC); Recount (HBO)

== Awards breakdown ==
The following films and programs received multiple nominations:

=== Films ===
Nominations	Film
5	The Curious Case of Benjamin Button
5	Doubt
5	Frost/Nixon
4	The Reader
4	Revolutionary Road
4	Slumdog Millionaire
4	Vicky Cristina Barcelona
3	In Bruges
3	The Wrestler
2	Bolt
2	Burn After Reading
2	Changeling
2	Happy-Go-Lucky
2	I've Loved You So Long (II y a longtemps que je t'aime)
2	Last Chance Harvey
2	Mamma Mia!
2	Tropic Thunder
2	WALL-E

=== Television ===
Nominations	Series
5	In Treatment
5	Recount
4	John Adams
3	30 Rock
3	Bernard and Doris
3	Entourage
3	Mad Men
2	Brothers & Sisters
2	Californication
2	Dexter
2	House
2	The Office
2	True Blood
2	Weeds

The following films and programs received multiple wins:

=== Film ===
Wins	Film
4	Slumdog Millionaire
2	The Wrestler

=== Television ===
Wins	Series
4	John Adams
3	30 Rock

== Ceremony ==
=== Presenters ===
- Simon Baker
- Elizabeth Banks
- Sacha Baron Cohen
- Drew Barrymore
- Tom Brokaw
- Pierce Brosnan
- Sandra Bullock
- Gerard Butler
- Don Cheadle
- Glenn Close
- Sean Combs
- Tom Cruise
- Patrick Dempsey
- Johnny Depp
- Cameron Diaz
- David Duchovny
- Aaron Eckhart
- Zac Efron
- Colin Farrell
- Laurence Fishburne
- Megan Fox
- Ricky Gervais
- Jake Gyllenhaal
- Maggie Gyllenhaal
- Salma Hayek
- Dustin Hoffman
- Terrence Howard
- The Jonas Brothers
- Shah Rukh Khan
- Jane Krakowski
- Jessica Lange
- Blake Lively
- Eva Longoria
- Jennifer Lopez
- Eva Mendes
- Demi Moore
- Hayden Panettiere
- Chris Pine
- Freida Pinto
- Amy Poehler
- Zachary Quinto
- Seth Rogen
- Susan Sarandon
- Martin Scorsese
- Sting
- Emma Thompson
- Mark Wahlberg
- Sigourney Weaver
- Rainn Wilson
- Renee Zellweger

=== Cecil B. DeMille Award ===
Steven Spielberg

=== Miss Golden Globe ===
Rumer Willis (daughter of Bruce Willis & Demi Moore)

Note: Heath Ledger's award was accepted on his behalf by director of The Dark Knight, Chris Nolan.

== See also ==
- Hollywood Foreign Press Association
- 81st Academy Awards
- 61st Primetime Emmy Awards
- 60th Primetime Emmy Awards
- 15th Screen Actors Guild Awards
- 62nd British Academy Film Awards
- 29th Golden Raspberry Awards
- 63rd Tony Awards
- 2008 in film
- 2008 in American television
