= Leningrad Cowboys discography =

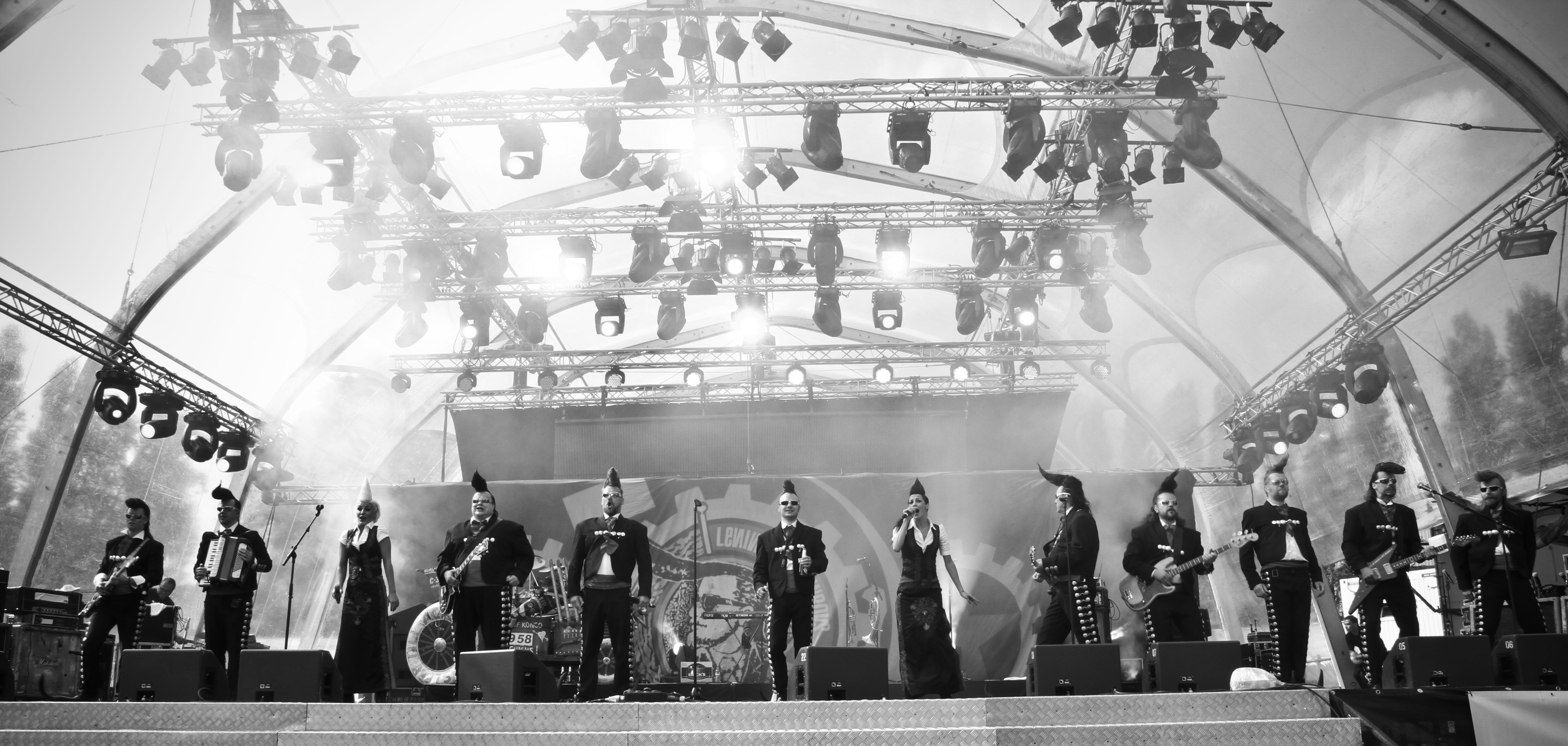
- Leningrad Cowboys in Berlin
- Studio albums: 10
- Extended plays: 4
- Soundtrack albums: 1
- Live albums: 4
- Compilation albums: 4
- Singles: 14
- Video albums: 8
- Music videos: 15
- Books: 3
- Miscellaneous: 2

This is the discography of the Finnish rock band Leningrad Cowboys, which consists of nine studio albums, thirteen singles, four live albums, four extended plays, four compilation albums, and one soundtrack album in addition to a number of miscellaneous appearances on soundtracks and compilations featuring various artists.

The Leningrad cowboys were formed in 1986 by members of the Finnish group Sleepy Sleepers and film director Aki Kaurismäki as a joke on the waning power of the Soviet Union. Kaurismäki's first feature with the group was a success and led to the group developing a life beyond the films, recording albums, giving concerts, and making their own videos.

== Albums ==
=== Studio albums ===
Year	Album details
1987	1917–1987: Released: 1987; Label: AMT (AMT 2005); Formats: LP, CD, cassette (CS)
1992	We Cum From Brooklyn: Released: 1992; Label: Plutonium (PLUTO 7001); Formats: LP, CD, CS
1994	Happy Together: Released: 1994; Label: Plutonium (PLUTOCD 7006); Formats: CD, CS
1996	Go Space: Released: 1996; Label: Megamania (1000 120 622); Formats: CD, CS
1997	Mongolian Barbeque: Released: 1997; Label: Megamania (1000 120782); Formats: CD
2000	Terzo Mondo: Released: 2000; Label: Johanna Kustannus (1000 121472); Formats: CD
2006	Zombies Paradise: Released: 2006; Label: Sony BMG (82876833792)
2011	Buena Vodka Social Club: Released: 28 October 2011; Label: SPV Recordings (SPV 309930 CD); Formats: CD, 2x10" LP
2013	Merry Christmas: Released December 2013; Label: Leningrad Cowboys Ltd. (LC006); Format: CD; Note: Released in box set with hardcover book, chocolate bar, and badges
2025	Christmas Gift: Released 7 November 2025 (streaming), 28 November 2025(CD & LP); Format: Digital, CD, vinyl; Label: Stupido Records (TWINCD305 [CD]; TWINLP305 [LP])

=== Soundtracks ===
Year	Album details
1989	Leningrad Cowboys Go America: Released: 1989; Label: AMT (AMTCD 2015)

=== Live albums ===
Year	Album details
1992	Live in Prowinzz: Released: 1992; Label: Plutonium (PLUTO 7002); Formats: 2xLP, CD, CS
1993	Total Balalaika Show – Helsinki Concert: Released: 1993; Label: Plutonium (PLUTOCD 7004); Formats: 2xCD, CS
1995	Nokia Balalaika Show: Released: 1995; Label: Megamania (NOKIACD 001); Formats: CD; Note: Promotional release
2003	Global Balalaika Show: Released: 21 November 2003; Label: Leningrad Cowboys Ltd. (LC-001); Formats: CD
2011	Hedengren 25.8.2011: Released: 2011; Label: Leningrad Cowboys Ltd. (LC-005); Formats: CD

=== Compilations ===
Year	Album details
1993	Now That's What We Call Leningrad Cowboys!!: Released: 1993; Label: Ariola (PDTD-1091); Format: CD; Note: Promotional release
1999	Thank You Very Many - Greatest Hits & Rarities: Released: 13 September 1999; Label: BMG Ariola (74321 62 147 2); Format: CD
2000	Leningrad Cowboys Go Wild: Released: 13 March 2000; Label: Ariola Express (74321 73839 2); Format: CD
2009	Those Were the Days - The Best Of Leningrad Cowboys: Released: April 2009; Label: Leningrad Cowboys Ltd (LC-004); Format: 2xCD; Note: Box set with paying cards
2014	Those Were the Hits: Released: 4 April 2014; Label: Johanna Kustannus (3778018); Format: 2xCD

== Singles ==
Year	Title	Format	Label	Album
1987	"L. A. Woman"	7"	AMT	1917–1987
1987	"In the Ghetto"	12"	AMT	1917–1987
1991	"Thru The Wire (Short Film)"	7", CD	Chlodwig/BMG Ariola	Leningrad Cowboys Go America
1991	"Those Were The Days"	CD	AMT/BMG Ariola	We Cum from Brooklyn
1992	"Thru the Wire"	CD	BMG Ariola	We Cum from Brooklyn
1992	"Those Were The Days"	7", CD	Chlodwig/BMG Ariola	We Cum from Brooklyn
1993	"These Boots"	CD	BMG Ariola, Plutonium	We Cum from Brooklyn
1994	"Gari Gari ~ Can Chu-hi"	3" CD	Ariola	Happy Together (Japanese version)
1996	"Jupiter Calling"	CD	BMG Ariola, Megamania	Go Space
1996	"Where's The Moon"	CD	BMG Ariola, Megamania	Go Space
1999	"Mardi Gras Ska"	CD	Megamania	Terzo Mondo
2000	"Happy Being Miserable"	CD	Johanna Kustannus	Terzo Mondo
2000	"Monkey Groove" (remix)	CD	Johanna Kustannus	Terzo Mondo
2004	"Der Lachende Vagabund"	CD (Promo)	Leningrad Cowboys Ltd.	Zombies Paradise
2006	"You're My Heart, You're My Soul"	CD	Sony BMG	Zombies Paradise

== EPs ==
Year	Title	Format	Label
1994	Nokia Balalaika Show	CD	Plutonium
1995	Vodka	CD (promo)	Plutonium
1997	Mongolian Barbeque	CD	Megamania
2008	007 Villain Club by Swatch	CD (Promo)	Spark Records

== Videography ==
=== Feature films ===
Year	Title	Director
1989	Leningrad Cowboys Go America	Aki Kaurismäki
1994	Leningrad Cowboys Meet Moses	Aki Kaurismäki
1998	L.A. Without a Map	Mika Kaurismäki

=== Concert films ===
Year	Title	Director	Notes
1994	Total Balalaika Show	Aki Kaurismäki	
1994	Nokia Balalaika Show		Concert
2001	Leningrad Cowboys Go Classic		TV broadcast (NDR)
2003	Global Balalaika Show	Timo Suomi	TV broadcast (YLE)
2004	Leningrad Cowboys Play Hurriganes		Concert of Hurriganes music – TV broadcast (YLE)

=== Music videos ===
Year	Title	Director
1986	"Rocky VI"	Aki Kaurismäki
1987	"Thru The Wire"	Aki Kaurismäki
1988	"L.A. Woman"	Aki Kaurismäki
1991	"Those Were The Days"	Aki Kaurismäki
1992	"These Boots"	Aki Kaurismäki
1996	"Jupiter Calling"	Sakke Järvenpää
1996	"Leningrad"	Sakke Järvenpää
1996	"Where's The Moon"	Sakke Järvenpää
2000	"Happy Being Miserable"	
2007	"You're My Heart, You're My Soul"	
2011	"All We Need is Love"	Dirk Behlau, Sakke Järvenpää
2011	"Gimme Your Sushi"	Dirk Behlau, Sakke Järvenpää
2012	"Buena Vodka Social Club"	Dirk Behlau
2012	"Machine Gun Blues"	Dirk Behlau
2012	"Christmas in Hollis"	Luca Bruno

== Bibliography ==
Year	Title	Author(s)	Publisher	ISBN
1994	Merry Christmas Leningrad Cowboys; *Published in Finnish, English, and German editions	Seppo Hämäläinen; Sakke Järvenpää; Mato Valtonen	Otava Publishing	ISBN 951-1-13557-0 (Finnish); ISBN 951-1-13568-6 (English); ISBN 951-1-13569-4 (German)
1995	Leningrad Cowboys – Sweet Home Mexico; *Published in Finnish only	Seppo Hämäläinen; Sakke Järvenpää; Mato Valtonen	Otava Publishing	ISBN 951-1-13951-7
2008	PRAVDA – The Truth About The Leningrad Cowboys; *Published in English, German, and Finnish in the same volume	Roman Schatz	Johnny Kniga / WSOY Publishing	ISBN 978-951-0-34595-5

== Contributions and other releases ==
Year	Album title	Label	Song(s)
1986	Rock'y VI - Pölkyllä päähän (Sleepy Sleepers LP)	AMT	This album credits Leningrad Cowboys on the back cover and features a Finnish language version of "Rocky VI"
1998	"Il Diavolo Rosso" (David Buzzi EP)	Pony	"Gringo" ("Ten Lost Gringos", with new vocals written and performed by David Buzzi)
2006	Jukebox – Music In The Films Of Aki Kaurismäki	Megamania	"Thru' The Wire"; "The Cossack Song"; "Ballad Of The Leningrad Cowboys"; "Those Were The Days"; "Nolo Tengo Dinares"*; "Kili Watch" (w/ André Wilms)*; "Delilah" (w/ Sakari Kuosmanen); *Previously unlreased tracks
