= Ben Granfelt =

Finnish guitarist (born 1963)

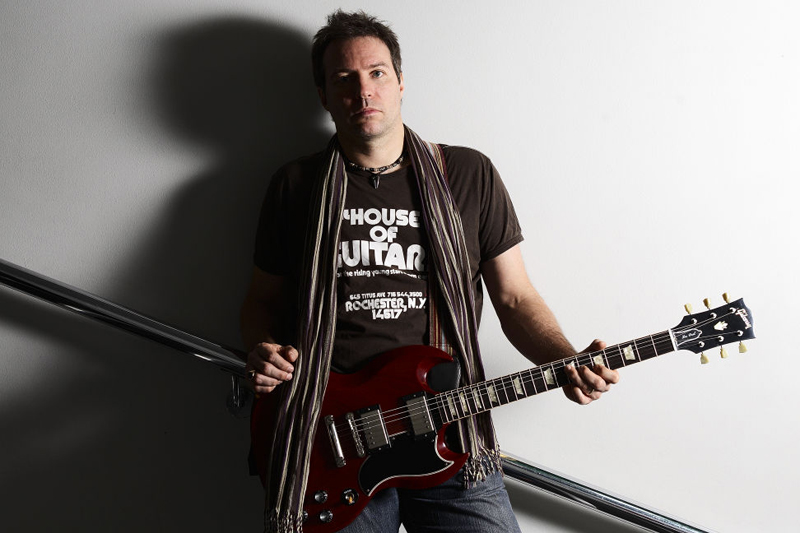

Background information
- Born: Ben Granfelt; 16 June 1963 (age 63); Helsinki, Finland
- Genres: Rock
- Occupations: Singer-songwriter; musician
- Instruments: Guitar; vocals
- Formerly of: Wishbone Ash

Ben Granfelt (born 16 June 1963) is a Finnish guitarist from Helsinki, best known from his work in Leningrad Cowboys, Wishbone Ash, Gringos Locos, Guitar Slingers and his solo band Ben Granfelt Band.

Granfelt's most active and recent band named Ben Granfelt Band was formed in 1993 and since then they have toured clubs and festivals in Finland, United Kingdom, Germany, United States, Austria, Switzerland and United Arab Emirates where they appeared at the Abu Dhabi and Dubai Jazz Festivals. Ben's latest album True Colors was released in 2020.

Ben Granfelt Band began working on their 11th album in February 2010 but Granfelt's family issues forced him to put both the album and the band on hiatus in June 2010. Soon after making this decision, Granfelt was asked to join Finnish rock band Los Bastardos Finlandeses. It did not take long for Granfelt to join Los Bastardos Finlandeses full-time and contribute to songwriting for their next album.

Granfelt left Los Bastardos in 2015 and has since then continued to release solo albums and is actively touring in Europe. He is also a member of the highly acclaimed Pink Floyd tribute band Drink Floyd. On the side of music he has also achieved nidan (二段:にだん) a second degree black belt in karate and is a 2 stripe black belt in Brazilian Jiu-Jitsu.

== Equipment ==
Equipment as of 12/2009

Guitars

- Fender −63 Strat Daphne Blue over sunburst
- Gibson – 59 Custom shop "Stripe" Les Paul
- Realguitars HSS Strat
- Fender – 73 Strat with a Floyd Rose tremolp system

Ben uses Bluguitar Amp1 mercury amps and Fatcab and Nanocab speakers. He has 2 main pedalboards, one stereo setup and one mono setup.

== Discography ==
=== Los Bastardos Finlandeses ===
- Saved By Rock'n'Roll – 2011 100% Record Company
- Day Of The Dead – 2013 Ranka Kustannus
- BMF Ball – 2015 100% Record Company

=== Ben Granfelt (Band) ===
- The Truth – 1994 Megamania
- Radio Friendly – 1996 Megamania
- LIVE – 1997 Megamania
- E.G.O – 1999 Megamania
- All I Want to Be – 2001 Megamania
- The Past Experience – 2004 Megamania
- Live Experience – 2006 Bonnier/Amigo
- Sum of Memories – 2006 Bonnier/Amigo
- Notes from the Road – 2007 Bonnier/Amigo
- Kaleidoscope – 2009 Windseekers
- Melodic Relief – 2012 Sprucefield
- Handmade – 2014 Turenki Records
- Live – 20th Anniversary Tour – 2015 Rokarola Records
- Time Flies When You're Playing Guitar – 2016 Sprucefield
- Another Day – 2017 Tuohi Records
- My Soul To you – 2018 A1 Records
- My Soul LIVE to You – 2019 Sprucefield
- True Colours – 2020 A1 Records
- LIVE... Because we can – 2021 A1 Records
- Gratitude – 2023 Onstage Records
- It's Personal – 2025 A1 Records

=== Gringos Locos ===
- Gringos Locos – 1987 Mercury
- Punch Drunk – 1989 Atlantic
- Raw Deal – 1991 Fazer
- Second Coming of Age – 2009 Windseekers

=== Wishbone Ash ===
- Bona Fide, CD – 2002 Talking Elephant
- Live in London and Beyond, DVD – 2003 Classic Rock
- Phoenix Rising, DVD – 2004 Classic Rock

=== Guitar Slingers ===
- Guitar Slingers – 1994 Sony
- Song and Dance – 1996 Sony
- That Little Something – 1998 Guitar Slinger Records
- Guitar Slingers (Double-CD) – 1998 RAWK Records

=== Leningrad Cowboys ===
- We Cum From Brooklyn – 1992 BMG
- Total Balalaika Show - Helsinki Concert – 1993 BMG
- Live in Prowinzz – 1993 BMG
- Happy Together – 1994 BMG
- Go Space – 1996 BMG

== Filmography ==
- Leningrad Cowboys Meet Moses (1994) film directed by Aki Kaurismäki.
- Total Balalaika Show (1994) documentary directed by Aki Kaurismäki.
