= Thank You Very Many – Greatest Hits & Rarities =

Thank You Very Many Greatest Hits & Rarities

Greatest hits album by Leningrad Cowboys
- Released: 13 September 1999
- Label: BMG Ariola

Leningrad Cowboys chronology
Mongolian Barbeque (1997)	Thank You Very Many; Greatest Hits & Rarities (1999)	Terzo Mondo (2000)

Thank You Very Many – Greatest Hits & Rarities is a greatest hits album by the Leningrad Cowboys released in Germany 13 September 1999.

== Track listing ==
No.	Title	Length
1.	"Those Were the Days" (from We Cum From Brooklyn, 1992)	4:18
2.	"Thru the Wire (Soft Version)" (from the "Thru the Wire" CD single, 1992)	3:08
3.	"Säkkijärven Polkka" (from Live in Prowinzz, 1992)	2:00
4.	"Katjusha" (from Live in Prowinzz, 1992)	3:03
5.	"Desconsolado" (from Leningrad Cowboys Go America, 1989)	3:27
6.	"Tequila" (from Leningrad Cowboys Go America, 1989)	1:08
7.	"Enchilada" (Mongolian Barbeque, 1997)	2:19
8.	"Just a Gigolo (I Ain't Got Nobody)" (from Happy Together, 1994)	4:39
9.	"Back in the USSR" (from We Cum from Brooklyn, 1992)	3:25
10.	"These Boots (Single Edit)" (from the "These Boots" CD single, 1993)	3:05
11.	"Ballad of the Leningrad Cowboys" (from Leningrad Cowboys Go America, 1989)	2:39
12.	"Thru the Wire (Short Film)" (from Leningrad Cowboys Go America, 1989)	5:25
13.	"L.A. Woman (Short Film)" (from Leningrad Cowboys Go America, 1989)	4:57
14.	"Kassaka" (from We Cum from Brooklyn, 1992)	3:59
15.	"Gimme All Your Lovin'" (from Happy Together, 1994)	3:08
16.	"Where's the Moon" (from' Go Space, 1996)	3:49
17.	"Jupiter Calling" (from Go Space, 1996)	3:00
18.	"Showtime" (from the "Jupiter Calling" CD single, 1996)	3:08
19.	"Life Is a Bitch (Elämässä Pitää Olla Runkkua)" (from the "These Boots" CD single, 1993)	3:59
20.	"Sabre Dance (Instrumental)" (from the "These Boots" CD single, 1993)	4:14
21.	"Herzilein" (from We Cum from Brooklyn, 1992)	3:45
22.	"Answering Machine Messages" 22a. "Just a Moment" (0:56) 22b. "You Are Just a Mobilephone" (0:39) 22c. "Drunken Bitch" (0:56) 22d. "Hello Loser!" (0:48) 22e. "Mr. Silu Seppälä – The Healthnut" (0:23) 22f. "Outerspace" (0:29)" (Bonus track from the "Where's the Moon" CD single, 1996)	2:11
