= Leningrad Cowboys Go America =

1989 film by Aki Kaurismäki

- German theatrical poster
- Directed by: Aki Kaurismäki
- Screenplay by: Aki Kaurismäki
- Story by: Sakke Järvenpää; Aki Kaurismäki; Mato Valtonen
- Produced by: Aki Kaurismäki; Klas Olofsson; Katinka Faragó
- Starring: Matti Pellonpää; Kari Väänänen; Sakke Järvenpää; Heikki Keskinen; Pimme Korhonen; Sakari Kuosmanen; Puka Oinonen; Silu Seppälä; Mauri Sumén; Mato Valtonen; Pekka Virtanen; Nicky Tesco
- Cinematography: Timo Salminen
- Edited by: Raija Talvio
- Music by: Mauri Sumén
- Production companies: Villealfa Filmproductions; Svenska Filminstitutet
- Distributed by: Finnkino
- Release date: 24 March 1989
- Running time: 79 minutes
- Countries: Finland; Sweden
- Language: English

Leningrad Cowboys Go America is a 1989 road movie by Finnish film director Aki Kaurismäki about the adventures of the Leningrad Cowboys, an eccentric band that travels to the USA to become successful and combines their brand of polka music with various American styles as they make their way to Mexico.

== Plot ==
The Leningrad Cowboys, a band with foot-long quiff hairstyles and long Winklepicker shoes to match, live in the tundra. Their manager Vladimir tries to promote them, but nobody seems to like their music, except for the mute village idiot, Igor. They are encouraged to move to America, for people will "buy anything" there. They depart for New York, bringing with them a band member who had frozen the previous night while practicing outside. Igor, who was not invited to come with them, stows away in the plane's baggage hold.

They arrive at the CBGB bar in Manhattan. An agent first suggests they should play at Madison Square Garden or Yankee Stadium, but after hearing their music, offers them a gig at a wedding in Mexico instead. He also recommends that they change their musical style to rock and roll. They buy a used 1975 Cadillac Fleetwood 75 Limousine, strap the coffin carrying their frozen band member onto the roof and set off to earn their way through the Deep South, adapting their musical style to suit local tastes at each new location. All the while they are being driven on and exploited by Vladimir, who hoards the money, takes most of the food for himself and hides beer in the ice-filled coffin. Meanwhile, Igor follows the band by his own means of transportation. When he finally catches up with them, the band members have revolted against Vladimir and tied him up, but Igor frees him and becomes the band's road manager.

During the trip, the band spends time in jail, has their car engine stolen, causes a nightclub to close after playing an unsuccessful show, and reunites with a long-lost cousin whose singing earns them positive reception from the audience. They eventually make it to Mexico and perform their wedding gig, where Igor revives the thawing bass guitarist with a shot of tequila and joins the group on stage. Vladimir watches them play then wanders off, but the band finally finds success in Mexico, making the top ten.

== Cast ==
Main actors:

- Matti Pellonpää as Vladimir Kuzmin (manager)
- Kari Väänänen as The Mute (Igor)
- Jim Jarmusch as car salesman
- Richard Boes as rock promoter
- The Leningrad Cowboys (Sakke Järvenpää, Heikki Keskinen, Sakari Kuosmanen, Puka Oinonen, Silu Seppälä, Mauri Sumén, Mato Valtonen, Pekka Virtanen) as themselves
- Nicky Tesco as lost cousin

The film includes cameos by blues guitarist Duke Robillard and American rockabilly Hall of Famer Colonel Robert Morris with his wife Irene.

== Production ==
The idea to create the Leningrad Cowboys as an absurd band came from Sleepy Sleepers members Sakke Järvenpää and Mato Valtonen, who asked Kaurismäki to direct a music video for them in 1986. Kaurismäki directed the short film Rocky VI (1986) and the Leningrad Cowboys videos Thru the Wire (1987) and L.A. Woman (1988), and then started work on Leningrad Cowboys Go America.

The film had a budget of 3,645,184 Finnish markka and received a grant of 400,000 markka from the Finnish Film Foundation.

== Soundtrack ==
Leningrad Cowboys Go America

Soundtrack album by Leningrad Cowboys
- Released: 1989
- Label: AMT

Leningrad Cowboys chronology
1917–1987 (1988)	Leningrad Cowboys Go America (1989)	We Cum from Brooklyn (1992)

Singles from Leningrad Cowboys Go America
- 1. "Thru the Wire (Short Film)" Released: 1991

Leningrad Cowboys go America is a 1989 album by the Finnish band Leningrad Cowboys and also the soundtrack of the film of the same name directed by Aki Kaurismäki.

=== Track listing ===
No.	Title	Lyrics	Music	Length
1.	"L.A. Woman"	Jim Morrison	Jim Morrison	4:55
2.	"Thru the Wire (Short Film)"	Nick Tesco	Silu Seppälä	5:25
3.	"Rocky VI"	Tesco	Silu Seppälä/Pekka Virtanen	7:33
4.	"Marching"		Mauri Sumén	1:18
5.	"Flight AY 105"		Sumén	2:09
6.	"Sunday Morning"		Sumén	2:49
7.	"Highway"		Sumén	1:59
8.	"Blue Swing"		Sumén	1:40
9.	"On the Road"		Sumén	3:02
10.	"Glamour Cowboy"		Sumén	2:02
11.	"No Man's Land"		Sumén	1:55
12.	"Ten Lost Gringos"		Sumén	2:57
13.	"Mambo from Säkkijärvi"		Sumén	1:59
14.	"Desconsolado"		Unknown	3:27
15.	"Ballad of the Leningrad Cowboy"	Tesco	Mark Smith	2:39
16.	"Tequila"		Chuck Rio	1:08
17.	"Chasing the Light"	Tesco	Smith	2:20

The German and Japanese track listings have a different order and add two additional tracks:

German/Japanese track listing
No.	Title	Lyrics	Music	Length
1.	"L.A. Woman (Short Film)"	Jim Morrison	Jim Morrison	4:55
2.	"Marching"		Mauri Sumen	1:18
3.	"Flight AY 105"		Sumen	2:09
4.	"Thru the Wire (Short Film)"	Nick Tesco	Silu Seppälä	5:25
5.	"Sunday Morning"		Sumen	2:49
6.	"Highway"		Sumen	1:59
7.	"Rocky VI (Short Film)"	Tesco	Silu Seppälä/Pekka Virtanen	7:33
8.	"Blue Swing"		Sumen	1:40
9.	"On the Road"		Sumen	3:02
10.	"That's All Right" (Only on German/Japanese version)	Arthur Crudup	Arthur Crudup	1:30
11.	"Glamour Cowboy"		Sumen	2:02
12.	"No Man's Land"		Sumen	1:55
13.	"Born to Be Wild" (Only on German/Japanese version)	Mars Bonfire	Mars Bonfire	3:30
14.	"Ten Lost Gringos"		Sumen	2:57
15.	"Mambo from Säkkijärvi"		Sumen	1:59
16.	"Desconsolado"		Unknown	3:27
17.	"Ballad of the Leningrad Cowboy"	Tesco	Mark Smith	2:39
18.	"Tequila"		Chuck Rio	1:08
19.	"Chasing the Light"	Tesco	Smith	2:20

== Reception ==
The film was ranked #88 in Empire magazine's "The 100 Best Films Of World Cinema" in 2010. It also holds a 100% "Fresh" rating on review site Rotten Tomatoes based on 6 reviews. As Kaurismäki's first film that was released in the United States, it has been described as his "breakthrough picture".

== Sequels and home media ==
Leningrad Cowboys Go America was followed five years later by a sequel, Leningrad Cowboys Meet Moses (1994) and a concert film Total Balalaika Show (1994). The film was reissued on DVD in October 2011, as part of the Criterion Collection's Eclipse series, paired with the other two Leningrad Cowboys films.
