= Jupiter Calling =

Jupiter Calling may refer to:

- Jupiter Calling (album), a 2017 album by The Corrs
- "Jupiter Calling", a 1997 song by Per Gessle
  - "Jupiter Calling", a cover by the Leningrad Cowboys, released from the album Go Space as a single
