= 1917 (disambiguation) =

1917 is a year in the Gregorian calendar.

1917 may also refer to:

- 1917 (1970 film), a short British film by Stephen Weeks
- 1917 (2019 film), a British war film by Sam Mendes
- "1917", a B-side instrumental by David Bowie on the 1999 album Hours

== See also ==
- 1917–1987 (album), a 1987 album by the Leningrad Cowboys
- 1917 Club, a club for socialists in London
- 1917 Cuyo, an asteroid
- M1917 (disambiguation)
- Warfare 1917, a 2008 strategy game
