= Olos =

Studio album by Absoluuttinen Nollapiste
- Released: March 3, 2000
- Recorded: December 15–17, 1999 and January 3–21, 2000
- Genre: Progressive rock
- Length: 45:36
- Label: Johanna Kustannus, Love Kustannus
- Producer: Otto Hallamaa and Absoluuttinen Nollapiste

Absoluuttinen Nollapiste chronology
Suljettu (1999)	Olos (2000)	Olen pahoillani - valitut teokset 1994-2000 (2001)

Professional ratings
Review scores
Source	Rating
Allmusic	link
Rumba	4.5/5 (May 2000)
Soundi	4/5 April, 2000

Olos (2000) is an album by the Finnish rock group Absoluuttinen Nollapiste.

== Track listing ==
1. "Valajas helkures" (Aake Otsala, Aki Lääkkölä) – 3:02
2. "Kalkin sammutus" (Otsala, Tommi Liimatta) – 4:10
3. "Kotiinpaluu, jotenkin" (Otsala, Liimatta, Lääkkölä) – 3:02
4. "Tavan sinä pyhität" (Liimatta, Otsala, Tomi Krutsin) – 3:41
5. "Ja jos" (Liimatta) – 3:54
6. "Tie tomun suuntima" (Liimatta, Lääkkölä) – 4:06
7. "Neljä ruukkua neliössä" (Liimatta, Lääkkölä) – 3:47
8. "Synkkää lunastusta, baby" (Liimatta, Lääkkölä) – 3:33
9. "Käsitys mummoloista" (Otsala, Liimatta, Lääkkölä) – 5:15
10. "Soita kotiin, Elvis" (Liimatta) – 3:33
11. "Harhailua maastossa" (Liimatta, Lääkkölä) – 4:44
12. "Tonttirajat sovitaan humalassa" (Liimatta, Lääkkölä, Otsala) – 3:43

== Personnel ==
- Tommi Liimatta - Vocals, Pieksämäki Guitar
- Aki Lääkkölä - Guitar, Keyboards
- Aake Otsala - Bass Guitar
- Tomi Krutsin - Drums
- Teemu Eskelinen - Vocals
- Otto Hallamaa - Öylätti Guitar, Producer, Engineer, Mixing
- Absoluuttinen Nollapiste - Producers
- Juuso Nordlund - Engineer, Mixing
- Pauli Saastamoinen - Mastering
- Tuula Alajoki - Photography
- Jooga Jykylä - Photography
- Japa Mattila - Layout
