= Nimi muutettu =

Studio album by Absoluuttinen Nollapiste
- Released: April 19, 2002
- Recorded: February 2002
- Genre: Progressive rock
- Length: 47:49
- Label: Johanna Kustannus, J. Karppanen, Megamania

Absoluuttinen Nollapiste chronology
'Olen pahoillani - valitut teokset 1994-2000' (2001)	Nimi muutettu (2002)	'Seitsemäs sinetti' (2003)

Professional ratings
Review scores
Source	Rating
Desibeli.net	4/5 link (in Finnish)

Nimi muutettu (2002) is an album by the Finnish rock group Absoluuttinen Nollapiste.

== Track listing ==
1. "Pyhä Nynny" (Tommi Liimatta, Aki Lääkkölä) — 4:44
2. "Aurinko Kaikennäkö" (Liimatta, Lääkkölä) — 5:32
3. "Eräät tulevat juosten" (Liimatta, Lääkkölä) — 4:53
4. "Uin ja näin (eri tapaus kuin Foliosurmat)" (Liimatta, Lääkkölä) — 6:02
5. "Ipswich" (Liimatta, Lääkkölä) — 4:36
6. "Vihkikaava ja käytäntö" (Liimatta, Lääkkölä) — 5:47
7. "Irene Kaktus" (Liimatta, Lääkkölä) — 4:25
8. "Liukuovet (kun patsas päätetään siirtää)" (Liimatta, Lääkkölä) — 4:20
9. "Pyhä Nynny II" (Liimatta, Lääkkölä) — 4:21
10. "Helikopterin varjo" (Liimatta, Lääkkölä) — 3:06

== Personnel ==
- Tommi Liimatta - vocals
- Aki Lääkkölä - guitar, keyboards
- Aake Otsala - bass guitar
- Tomi Krutsin - drums, percussion
