= Mahlanjuoksuttaja =

Studio album by Absoluuttinen Nollapiste
- Released: 5 October 2005
- Recorded: May – August 2005
- Genre: Progressive rock
- Length: 49:34
- Labels: Johanna Kustannus, J. Karppanen

Absoluuttinen Nollapiste chronology
Sortovuodet 1994-2004 (2004)	Mahlanjuoksuttaja (2005)

Professional ratings
Review scores
Source	Rating
Desibeli.net	4/5

Mahlanjuoksuttaja (2005) is an album by the Finnish rock group Absoluuttinen Nollapiste.

== Track listing ==
1. "Missä on kaikki mitä rakastan?" (Tommi Liimatta, Aki Lääkkölä) – 7:15
2. "Miten tässä vielä käy?" (Liimatta, Lääkkölä) – 2:59
3. "Milloin näiden vaikutus lakkaa?" (Liimatta, Lääkkölä) – 5:10
4. "Ruukunvalajat" (Liimatta) – 4:35
5. "Mikä meitä vaivaa?" (Liimatta, Lääkkölä) – 4:19
6. "Nielenkö todisteet?" (Liimatta, Lääkkölä) – 4:09
7. "Eksynyt marjastaja" (Liimatta, Lääkkölä) – 4:26
8. "Onko meiltä kuulunut meteliä?" (Liimatta, Lääkkölä) – 3:16
9. "Aution saaren irtain" (Liimatta, Lääkkölä) – 5:15
10. "Mahlanjuoksuttaja" (Liimatta, Lääkkölä) – 7:15

== Personnel ==
- Tommi Liimatta - vocals
- Aki Lääkkölä - guitar, lap steel guitar
- Aake Otsala - bass guitar
- Tomi Krutsin - drums, percussion
- Janne Hast - keyboards, trumpet
