= Muovi antaa periksi =

Studio album by Absoluuttinen Nollapiste
- Released: October 24, 1995
- Recorded: September 1995
- Genre: Progressive rock
- Length: 64:21
- Label: Johanna Kustannus, J. Karppanen

Absoluuttinen Nollapiste chronology
Neulainen Jerkunen (1994)	Muovi antaa periksi (1995)	Simpukka-amppeli (1998)

Muovi antaa periksi (The plastic buckles) (1995) is the second studio album by Finnish rock group Absoluuttinen Nollapiste.

== Track listing ==
1. "1900-luvun heleys" (Tommi Liimatta) – 3:15
2. "Saatteeksi" (Liimatta) – 2:27
3. "Ei, en ole rouva Bell" (Liimatta) – 3:17
4. "Joku unohti piirtää jalan" (Liimatta) – 1:17
5. "Kaikki metallit" (Aki Lääkkölä, Aake Otsala, Tomi Krutsin) – 1:20
6. "Jälkivaatimus" (Liimatta, Otsala) – 4:01
7. "Vuoto nieluun" (Liimatta) – 2:11
8. "Viisas lintu (haukka)" (Liimatta) – 2:50
9. "Älkääs nyt, äläs nyt" (Liimatta) – 0:49
10. "Liittymä" (Liimatta) – 2:32
11. "Olen pahoillani" (Lääkkölä) – 3:51
12. "Suojasivu" (Liimatta) – 2:42
13. "Savu meihin" (Liimatta, Lääkkölä) – 3:41
14. "Korkuinen muovikauris" (Liimatta) – 2:08
15. "Torin laita" (Liimatta) – 2:35
16. "Kankaalle" (Liimatta) – 2:07
17. "Kuvitus kirjoittajan" (Liimatta) – 1:06
18. "Liian lämpimät asunnot" (Liimatta) – 2:01
19. "Koira haistaa pelon" (Liimatta) – 3:50
20. "Öljy puulle" (Liimatta) – 5:05
21. "Sivulla jatkuu" (Liimatta) – 3:21
22. "Nollapisteen juuret" (Liimatta) – 1:38
23. "Yli 1000 erilaista kasvia" (Liimatta) – 6:17

== Personnel ==
- Tommi Liimatta - vocals, wind instruments
- Aki Lääkkölä - guitars, keyboards
- Aake Otsala - bass guitar
- Tomi Krutsin - drums, brass instrument
