= Seitsemäs sinetti =

Studio album by Absoluuttinen Nollapiste
- Released: September 19, 2003
- Recorded: March and July 2003
- Genre: Progressive rock
- Length: 46:52
- Label: Johanna Kustannus, J. Karppanen

Absoluuttinen Nollapiste chronology
'Nimi muutettu' (2002)	Seitsemäs sinetti (2003)	'Sortovuodet 1994-2004' (2004)

Professional ratings
Review scores
Source	Rating
Desibeli.net	2.5/5 link (in Finnish)

Seitsemäs sinetti (2003) is an album by the Finnish rock group Absoluuttinen Nollapiste.

== Track listing ==
1. "Kerro ketä ajattelit" (Tommi Liimatta, Aki Lääkkölä) – 4:43
2. "Viikon perehtymisjakso" (Liimatta, Lääkkölä, Tomi Krutsin) – 4:07
3. "Täytyy muistaa (tapaus Foliosurmat)" (Liimatta, Lääkkölä, Krutsin) – 4:09
4. "Tyynyn kääntöpuoli" (Aake Otsala) – 4:06
5. "Parta" (Otsala, Krutsin, Liimatta, Janne Hast) – 1:42
6. "Jarrutan" (Liimatta, Lääkkölä) – 4:57
7. "Käsitys lastenlapsista" (Liimatta, Krutsin) – 2:08
8. "Mustaa ei ole" (Liimatta, Lääkkölä) – 6:14
9. "Kultainen leikkaus" (Liimatta, Lääkkölä) – 5:42
10. "Nummirock" (Liimatta, Lääkkölä, Krutsin) – 4:09
11. "Sinetti" (Lääkkölä, Liimatta) – 5:00

== Personnel ==
- Tommi Liimatta – vocals
- Aki Lääkkölä – guitar
- Aake Otsala – bass guitar, vocals
- Tomi Krutsin – drums, percussion, vocals
- Janne Hast – keyboards
- Anna Ranki – vocals (1, 3, 11)
- Mikko Kuisma – violin (7, 10)
