= Sortovuodet 1994–2004 =

Compilation album by Absoluuttinen Nollapiste
- Released: September 1, 2004
- Genre: Progressive rock
- Label: Johanna Kustannus, J. Karppanen, Megamania

Absoluuttinen Nollapiste chronology
Seitsemäs sinetti (2003)	Sortovuodet 1994–2004 (2004)	Mahlanjuoksuttaja (2005)

Sortovuodet 1994–2004 (2004) is a double compilation album by the Finnish rock group Absoluuttinen Nollapiste. The first disc consists of B-sides from singles and other rarities, while the second disc is a complete live rendition of the album Suljettu.

== Track listing ==
=== Disc 1 ===
1. "Romanttinen komedia" (Tommi Liimatta, Aki Läkkölä) - 3:53
2. "Toukokuun leikit" (Liimatta) - 3:53
3. "Pelkkä Eugenius" (Lääkkölä, Aake Otsala, Tomi Krutsin, Janne Hast, Liimatta) - 6:11
4. "Tasan viikko bileisiin (silmukka kiristyy)" (Lääkkölä, Otsala, Krutsin, Hast, Liimatta) - 5:39
5. "050703" (Otsala) - 0:53
6. "Ylioppilaat" (Liimatta, Lääkkölä) - 3:05
7. "030303" (Lääkkölä, Otsala, Liimatta, Krutsin) - 4:08
8. "Pyhä Nynny III" (alternate mix) (Liimatta, Lääkkölä, Otsala, Krutsin) - 5:21
9. "20. elokuuta" (Liimatta) - 2:47
10. "Kun tanssi on valmis" (Liimatta, Läkkölä) - 3:13
11. "Hyönteisen kuolinnaamio" (Liimatta) - 3:01
12. "Ei syttynyt, mies hymähtää" (Liimatta, Läkkölä) - 5:10
13. "Yhteistä väliseinä" (Liimatta, Läkkölä) - 4:23
14. "Raami" (Liimatta) - 2:42
15. "Tekijän kuvittama" (Liimatta) - 2:23
16. "Perheenjäsen määrittelee (kotoisia esineitä käyttötarkoituksen mukaan ja suorittaa käytäntöön viittaavia yläkäsitemääritelmiä)" (Liimatta) - 2:54
17. "Kassi kauniita silmiä" (alternate mix) (Liimatta, Lääkkölä, Otsala, Krutsin) - 2:22
18. "Kaikkein kaunein Joo Komia" (Liimatta, Lääkkölä, Otsala, Krutsin) - 3:13
19. "MOVALNF" (Liimatta, Lääkkölä, Otsal, Krutsin) - 2:45
20. "Suu lähti liikkuun niinku muut" (Liimatta, Lääkkölä, Otsala, Krutsin) - 2:39
21. "YPEKE" (Liimatta, Lääkkölä, Otsala, Krutsin) - 2:45
22. "Kaikki nukkuu pois" (Liimatta, Lääkkölä, Otsala, Krutsin) - 4:07

=== Disc 2 ===
1. "Kasvatus" (Liimatta, Läkkölä) - 3:10
2. "Mihin" (Liimatta) - 4:16
3. "Esinekeräilyn hitaus" (Liimatta) - 3:11
4. "Täällä on joku" (Liimatta) - 3:53
5. "Portaat" (Otsala) - 3:59
6. "Kupit on kuin olisi häät" (Otsala, Liimatta, Lääkkölä) - 3:27
7. "Joen silmille" (Liimatta) - 3:34
8. "Sukututkimus lannistaa" (Liimatta) - 4:00
9. "Joutomaa" (Otsala) - 3:25
10. "Tungos on lavaste" (Liimatta) - 6:07
11. "Suvannossa ylpeä ilme I" (Liimatta) - 5:33
12. "Suvannossa ylpeä ilme II" (Liimatta) - 3:54
13. "Suvannossa ylpeä ilme III" (Liimatta) - 3:48
14. "Suvannossa ylpeä ilme IV" (Liimatta) - 3:11
15. "Suvannossa ylpeä ilme V" (Liimatta) - 6:46
16. "Kiilakivi" (Liimatta) - 3:11
17. "Olen pahoillani" (Lääkkölä) - 6:46
