= Simpukka-amppeli =

Studio album by Absoluuttinen Nollapiste
- Released: February 2, 1998
- Recorded: December 1997 and January 1998
- Genre: Progressive rock
- Length: 49:19
- Label: Johanna Kustannus, J. Karppanen, Love kustannus

Absoluuttinen Nollapiste chronology
'Muovi antaa periksi' (1995)	Simpukka-amppeli (1998)	'Suljettu' (1999)

Simpukka-amppeli (1998) is an album by the Finnish rock group Absoluuttinen Nollapiste.

== Track listing ==
1. "Silti" (Tommi Liimatta, S. Lyhty) - 3:02
2. "Ajoratamaalaus" (Liimatta) - 3:33
3. "Sanankeruumatka" (Liimatta) - 3:18
4. "Eläimen varmuus" (Liimatta) - 3:05
5. "Tapahtua" (Aake Otsala, Liimatta) - 2:21
6. "Tämä kun" (Liimatta, Aki Lääkkölä) - 4:22
7. "Tämä" (Liimatta) - 2:36
8. "Heitto-ovet" (Liimatta) - 3:23
9. "Ideakuvasto" (Otsala, Lääkkölä) - 2:32
10. "Ennen virhettä" (Liimatta) - 3:40
11. "Kaatua" (Otsala) - 3:08
12. "Sunnuntai" (Lääkkölä, Liimatta) - 3:49
13. "Viittä vaille sadetta" (Liimatta, Lyhty) - 10:09

== Personnel ==
- Tommi Liimatta - vocals, acoustic guitar
- Aki Lääkkölä - guitars, keyboards, accordion
- Aake Otsala - bass guitar, harmonica, vocals
- Tomi Krutsin - drums, percussion
- Teemu Eskelinen - backing vocals
