= Olen pahoillani – valitut teokset 1994–2000 =

Compilation album by Absoluuttinen Nollapiste
- Genre: Progressive rock
- Length: 71:07
- Label: Johanna Kustannus, J. Karppanen

Absoluuttinen Nollapiste chronology
'Olos' (2000)	Olen pahoillani – valitut teokset 1994–2000 (2001)	'Nimi muutettu' (2002)

Olen pahoillani – valitut teokset 1994–2000 (2001) is a compilation album by the Finnish rock group Absoluuttinen Nollapiste.

== Track listing ==
1. "Hyviä muistoja, huomenna suihkuun" (Tommi Liimatta, Aki Läkkölä) - 3:59
2. "Ja jos" (Liimatta) - 3:54
3. "Jälkivaatimus" (Liimatta, Aake Otsala) - 3:53
4. "Ajoratamaalaus" (Liimatta) - 3:35
5. "Silti" (Liimatta, S. Lyhty) - 3:02
6. "Kupit on kuin olisi häät" (Liimatta, Otsala, Lääkkölä) - 2:58
7. "Käyneet hedelmät" (Liimatta, Läkkölä) - 4:58
8. "Olen pahoillani" (Lääkkölä) - 3:53
9. "Kotiinpaluu, jotenkin" (Otsala, Liimatta, Lääkkölä) - 3:01
10. "Saatteeksi" (Liimatta) - 2:29
11. "Matkustajakoti Lintukoto" (Liimatta) - 3:17
12. "Esinekeräilyn hitaus" (Liimatta) - 2:34
13. "Portaat" (Otsala) - 3:24
14. "Raami" (Liimatta) - 2:43
15. "Soita kotiin, Elvis" (Liimatta) - 3:32
16. "Savu meihin" (Liimatta, Läkkölä) - 3:45
17. "Neljä ruukkua neliössä" (Liimatta, Lääkkölä) - 3:47
18. "Rarmos Ybrehtar" (Liimatta) - 2:35
19. "Eläimen varmuus" (Liimatta) - 3:04
20. "Koira haistaa pelon (koira haisee puulle)" (Liimatta) - 6:13
