= M1916 =

- a U.S. Army version of Canon d'Infanterie de 37 modèle 1916 TRP
- first version of the German Stahlhelm steel helmet

== See also ==
- M1915 (disambiguation)
- M1917 (disambiguation)
