= Ben Granfelt Band =

Finnish progressive blues-rock band

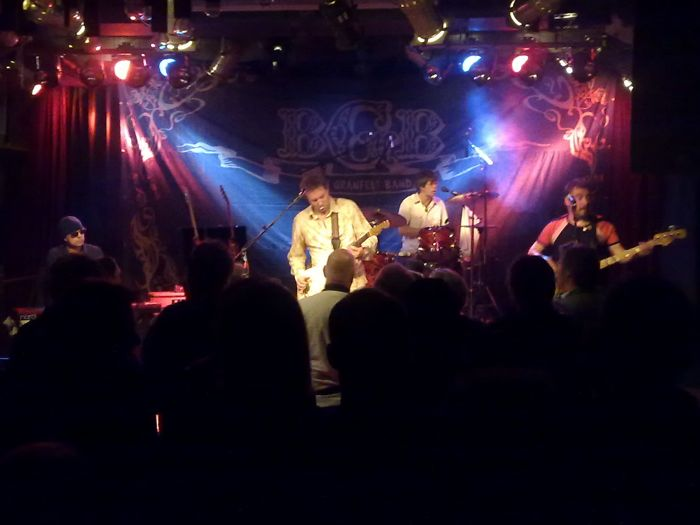
- Ben Granfelt Band in Hamburg, Germany, 2009

Background information
- Origin: Helsinki, Finland
- Genres: Blues, rock, progressive, groove
- Years active: 1993–present
- Labels: Sprucefield
- Members: Ben Granfelt; Miri Miettinen; John Vihervä; Robert Engstrand
- Past members: Kari Leppälä; Ako Kiiski; Lauri Porra; Anssi Växby; Harri Rantanen; Kasper Mårtenson
- Website: Ben Granfelt Website; Ben Granfelt Band Myspace

Ben Granfelt Band is a Finnish progressive blues-rock band formed in 1993. Led by singer-guitarist Ben Granfelt, Ben Granfelt Band (BGB) has released ten albums worldwide and toured clubs and festivals in Finland, United Kingdom, Germany, United States, Austria, Switzerland and United Arab Emirates where they appeared at the Abu Dhabi and Dubai Jazz Festivals. BGB’s latest album Kaleidoscope was released on Feb 4, 2009 in Finland with the rest of Europe following later that spring. The band is currently working on their 11th album due for release in September 2010.

BGB's music is described as a pure cocktail of rhythm, melody and soul where even progressive and heavy rock music styles blend in naturally. Some of their musical influences include the likes of Gov’t Mule, Jeff Beck, Peter Frampton and Robin Trower.

Ben Granfelt is a guitarist best known from his work in Leningrad Cowboys, Wishbone Ash, Gringos Locos, Guitar Slingers and his solo band Ben Granfelt Band. Granfelt appears on a total of 26 albums and schedules his life according to the family and hobbies that include martial arts.

Drummer Miri Miettinen has played with BGB since its incarnation. In his extensive career, Miettinen has played drums on over 300 albums as a studio musician and in numerous bands, films and theatrical plays. He is best known for playing with the 1980s rock groups Broadcast and Gringos Locos. He also works as a drum teacher and runs his own studio.

John Vihervä plays bass and was involved in the early stages of Finnish power metal band Stratovarius in 1982-84. "Groovemaster" Vihervä has also played with Five Fifteen, Monsterbore, Käsityöläiset, Boycott, Tommi Läntinen just to name a few.

Robert Engstrand is the newest member of BGB and plays keyboards. His previous musical experience includes working with Swedish progressive rock group The Flower Kings, metal singer Timo Kotipelto, battle metal band Turisas and Finnish legendary rockband Dingo.

== Band members ==
- Ben Granfelt (guitar, vocals)
- Miri Miettinen (drums, vocals)
- John Vihervä (bass, vocals)
- Robert Engstrand (keyboards, vocals)

== Former band members ==
- Kari Leppälä (bass)
- Kasper Mårtensson (keyboards)
- Ako Kiiski (bass, vocals)
- Lauri Porra (bass, vocals)
- Anssi Växby (bass, vocals)
- Harri Rantanen (bass, vocals)

== Additional musicians on albums ==
- Tero Pennanen (keyboards)
- Pekka Gröhn (keyboards)
- Abdissa "Mamba" Assefa (percussions)
- Petri Korpela (percussions)

== Discography ==
- The Truth - 1994 Megamania
- Radio Friendly - 1996 Megamania
- Live - 1997 Megamania
- E.G.O. - 1999 Megamania
- All I Want to Be - 2001 Megamania
- The Past Experience - 2004 Megamania
- Live Experience - 2006 Bonnier/Amigo
- Sum of Memories - 2006 Bonnier/Amigo
- Notes from the Road - 2007 Bonnier/Amigo
- Kaleidoscope - 2009 Windseekers
- Handmade - 7 March 2014 Turenki
