= Suljettu =

Studio album by Absoluuttinen Nollapiste
- Released: 22 March 1999
- Recorded: 17–31 January 1999
- Genre: Progressive rock
- Length: 56:59
- Labels: Johanna Kustannus, Love Kustannus

Absoluuttinen Nollapiste chronology
Simpukka-amppeli (1998)	Suljettu (1999)	Olos (2000)

Professional ratings
Review scores
Source	Rating
Allmusic	4.5/5 stars
Rumba	4.5/5
Soundi	4/5

Suljettu (1999) is an album by the Finnish rock group Absoluuttinen Nollapiste. It is a thematic concept album, telling the story of a father and a son living in a small, closed-minded Finnish town and is generally accepted as the group's masterpiece. Suljettu is Finnish for "closed".

== Track listing ==
1. "Kasvatus" (Aki Lääkkölä, Tommi Liimatta) – 2:23
2. "Mihin" (Liimatta) – 3:07
3. "Sukututkimus lannistaa (Liimatta) – 3:43
4. "Portaat" (Aake Otsala) – 3:24
5. "Kupit on kuin olisi häät" (Otsala, Liimatta, Lääkkölä) – 2:57
6. "Esinekeräilyn hitaus" (Liimatta) – 2:34
7. "Täällä on joku" (Liimatta) – 3:18
8. "Joutomaa" (Otsala) – 3:19
9. "Joen silmille" (Liimatta) – 3:08
10. "Tungos on lavaste" (Liimatta) – 5:25
11. "Kiilakivi" (Liimatta) – 2:40
12. "Suvannossa ylpeä ilme I-V" (Liimatta) – 20:46

== Personnel ==
- Tommi Liimatta - Guitar, Vocals
- Aki Lääkkölä - Guitar
- Aake Otsala - Bass Guitar, Vocals
- Tomi Krutsin - Drums, Vocals
- Teemu Eskelinen - Percussions, Vocals
- Juuso Nordlund - Engineer, Mixing
- Otto Hallamaa - Engineer, Mixing
- Mika Jussila - Mastering Engineer
