= Mongolian barbecue (disambiguation) =

Mongolian barbecue usually refers to a style of stir-fry griddle cooking that originated in Taiwan, and has nothing to do with Mongolia.

Mongolian barbecue may also refer to:

- Mongolian Barbeque (album), a 1997 album by Finnish rock and roll band Leningrad Cowboys
- Juan Tamad at Mister Shooli: Mongolian Barbecue, a 1991 Filipino film directed by Jun Urbano

== See also ==
- Mongolian cuisine
- Mongolian Barbeque Great Place to Party, a joke political party of the United Kingdom that contested an election in Wimbledon in 1997
