= Terzo Mondo =

Studio album by Leningrad Cowboys
- Released: 2000
- Label: Johanna Kustannus
- Producer: Paavo Maijanen; T.T. Oksala; Markku Mäntymaa

Leningrad Cowboys chronology
Thank You Very Many - Greatest Hits & Rarities (1999)	Terzo Mondo (2000)	Leningrad Cowboys Go Wild (2000)

Singles from Terzo Mondo
- 1. "Mardi Gras Ska" Released: 1999; 2. "Happy Being Miserable" Released: 2000; 3. "Monkey Groove (remix)" Released: 2000

Terzo Mondo is a 2000 studio album by the Leningrad Cowboys.

== Track listing ==
No.	Title	Writer(s)	Length
1.	"Mardi Gras Ska"	R. Johnson/Leningrad Cowboys	2:44
2.	"Happy Being Miserable"	R. Johnson/Leningrad Cowboys	3:40
3.	"Abu Dhabi"	R. Johnson/Mauri Sumén/Leningrad Cowboys	2:31
4.	"Lumberjack Lady"	Mauri Sumén/Leningrad Cowboys	3:07
5.	"Harem"	Mauri Sumén/R. Johnson/Leningrad Cowboys	3:19
6.	"Monkey Groove"	R. Johnson/V. Kääpä/Leningrad Cowboys	3:27
7.	"Da Da Harasoo"	Mauri Sumén/R. Johnson/Leningrad Cowboys	3:29
8.	"I Hate You"	R. Johnson/D. Wayne/Leningrad Cowboys	4:39
9.	"La Dulce Vida"	R. Johnson/Leningrad Cowboys	2:36
10.	"Bumpersticker Rock"	R. Johnson/V. Kääpä/Sakke Järvenpää/Leningrad Cowboys	3:45
11.	"Nolo Tengo"	Mauri Sumén/Sakke Järvenpää/Leningrad Cowboys	2:52
12.	"Emerald Blues"	R. Johnson/Leningrad Cowboys	4:31
13.	"There's Someone Smiling Down on Me"	R. Johnson/Leningrad Cowboys	2:47

== Singles ==
=== "Mardi Gras Ska" ===
1999 saw the release of "Mardi Gras Ska" as a single in Finland

CD
Megamania/ 1000 128332 (Finland)

1. "Mardi Gras Ska"
2. "Happy Being Miserable"
3. "Nolo Tengo"

=== "Happy Being Miserable" ===
"Happy Being Miserable" was released as a single in Finland and the Netherlands in 2000.

==== Track listings ====
CD
Johanna Kustannus/ 1000 131132 (Finland)

1. "Happy Being Miserable" – 3:38
2. "Back To Moscow" – 2:37

CD
Roadrunner Records/ RR 2102-2 (The Netherlands)

1. "Happy Being Miserable" – 3:38
2. "Back To Moscow" – 2:37

CD
Roadrunner Records/ RR 2102-3 (The Netherlands)

1. "Happy Being Miserable" – 3:38
2. "Mardi Gras Ska" – 2:44
3. "Back To Moscow" – 2:37

=== Leningrad Cowboys ===
In 2000 Johanna Kustannus released a two track remix single titled simply Leningrad Cowboys. The Remixes were done by Sound Freaks.

CD
Johanna Kustannus/ 1000 133532 (Finland)

1. "Monkey Groove" – 3:16
2. "Harem" – 3:16

== Personnel ==
The Leningrad Cowboys:

- Twist Twist Erkinharju - drums
- Tipe Johnson - vocals
- Sakke Järvenpää - vocals
- Vesa Kääpä - guitar
- Pemo Ojala - trumpet
- Ykä Putkinen - guitar
- Silu Seppälä - bass
- Antti Snellman - saxophone
- Mauri Sumén - keyboards

The Leningrad Ladies:

- Mari Hatakka - Go-Go and vocals
- Tiina Isohanni - Go-Go and vocals

Additional musicians:

- Paavo Maijanen - backing vocals and bas on "I Hate You" intro/outro
- T.T. Oksala - loops and samples
- Heikki Kangasniemi - fiddle on "Emerald Blues"
- Tatu Kemppainen - guitar and mandolin on "Emerald Blues"
- Kurt Lindblad - tin whistle on "Emerald Blues" and "Bumpersticker Rock"
- Puka Oinonen - saw on "Lumberjack Lady"
- Mika Salo - guitar solo on "Mardi Gras Ska"

Julle Ekblad - backing vocals on "There's Someone Smiling Down on Me"
