= Neulainen Jerkunen =

Studio album by Absoluuttinen Nollapiste
- Released: 22 October 1994
- Recorded: 9–14 July 1994
- Genre: Progressive rock
- Length: 63:32
- Labels: Vinylmania, Love Kustannus

Absoluuttinen Nollapiste chronology
Ei ilmestynyt (1994)	Neulainen Jerkunen (1994)	Muovi antaa periksi (1995)

Professional ratings
Review scores
Source	Rating
Rumba	(5/5) 20/1994

Neulainen Jerkunen (1994) is the debut studio album by Finnish rock group Absoluuttinen Nollapiste.

== Track listing ==
1. "Takalaittomien määrä ja taajuus" (Tommi Liimatta) – 0:10
2. "Lue tarina, osta puku, opi tanssi" (Liimatta) – 4:45
3. "Matkustajakoti Lintukoto" (Liimatta) – 3:19
4. "Kivoja kansioita" (Liimatta) – 4:33
5. "Ääniaallot tappaa syövän" (Liimatta) – 1:09
6. "Neulainen Jerkunen" (Liimatta) – 7:00
7. "Laatikkohevonen" (Liimatta) – 2:29
8. "Paikallinen nimikauhu tulee ellei maissi lopu" (Liimatta) – 4:51
9. "Ehdokkaat" (Aake Otsala, Liimatta) – 2:52
10. "Hallitsevien piirien vaatimukset" (Liimatta) – 3:46
11. "Siibu diibu daps dimli damlix" (Otsala, Liimatta, Aki Lääkkölä, Tomi Krutsin) – 1:29
12. "Syöt sen minkä jaksat" (Liimatta) – 7:19
13. "Pimeässä vietetty aika minuuteissa" (Liimatta) – 5:40
14. "Polki polveen katsos kiloheederle kaufen" (Liimatta) – 0:10
15. "Rarmos ybrehtar" (Liimatta) – 2:35
16. "Valtani viimeinen päivä" (Liimatta) – 10:17
17. "Seuraudet, Baude" (Liimatta) – 1:08

== Personnel ==
- Tommi Liimatta - Vocals, Wind Instruments, Chiquita Guitar
- Aki Lääkkölä - Guitars, Mandolin, Keyboards
- Aake Otsala - Bass Guitar
- Tomi Krutsin - Drums, Vocals
