= 007 Villain Club by Swatch =

EP by Leningrad Cowboys
- Released: September 2008
- Label: Spark Marketing Entertainment

Leningrad Cowboys chronology
Zombies Paradise (2006)	007 Villain Club by Swatch (2008)	Those Were the Days - The Best Of Leningrad Cowboys (2009)

007 Villain Club by Swatch (also known as 007 Villain Collection by Swatch)is a promotional EP distributed free on CD through Metro Magazine and Swatch the Club and as a free download through the Swatch, MTV and Yahoo websites. It was released to promote Swatch's 007 Villains Collection line of watches.

== Track listing ==
No.	Title	Writer(s)	Length
1.	"A View to a Kill"	John Barry, Duran Duran	3:18
2.	"Goldfinger"	John Barry, Leslie Bricusse, Anthony Newley	4:06
3.	"James Bond Theme"	Monty Norman	2:26
