= M1915 =

M1915 may refer to:

- 305 mm howitzer M1915, Russian artillery piece
- 37 mm trench gun M1915, Russian artillery piece
- Standschütze Hellriegel M1915, Austro-Hungarian submachine gun
- Ruby M1915, a self-loading pistol used as a French World War I sidearm
- Beretta Model 1915, an Italian semi-automatic pistol in World War I

== See also ==
- M1916 (disambiguation)
