= Merry Christmas (Leningrad Cowboys album) =

Studio album by Leningrad Cowboys
- Released: December 2013
- Label: Leningrad Cowboys Ltd.

Leningrad Cowboys chronology
Buena Vodka Social Club (2011)	Merry Christmas (2013)	Those Were the Hits (2014)

Merry Christmas is a 2013 studio album by the Leningrad Cowboys. Released exclusively in December 2013 in a box set with their book PRAVDA - The Truth About the Leningrad Cowboys, a Finnish chocolate bar, postcard, and pin. It was announced that it would be made available on its own in 2014.

== Track listing ==
No.	Title	Writer(s)	Length
1.	"Happy Xmas (War Is Over)"	John Lennon/Yoko Ono
2.	"Jingle Bell Rock"	Joe Beal/Jim Boothe
3.	"Little Saint Nick"	Brian Wilson/Mike Love
4.	"Santa Claus Is Coming to Town"	John Frederick Coots/Haven Gillespie
5.	"Merry Christmas (I Don't Want to Fight Tonight)"	Joey Ramone
6.	"Christmas (Baby Please Come Home)"	Jeff Barry/Ellie Greenwich/Phil Spector
7.	"Merry Xmas Everybody"	Noddy Holder/Jim Lea
8.	"The Little Drummer Boy"	Katherine Kennicott Davis
9.	"Rockin' Around the Christmas Tree"	Johnny Marks
10.	"Christmas in Hollis"	Joseph Simmons/Darryl McDaniels/Jason Mizell
11.	"Last Christmas"	George Michael
12.	"White Christmas"	Irving Berlin
