= Zombies Paradise =

Studio album by Leningrad Cowboys
- Released: 2006
- Genre: Heavy metal, hard rock, gothic metal, speed metal, groove metal, industrial metal
- Label: BMG Music Entertainment
- Producer: Leningrad Cowboys; T.T. Oksala

Leningrad Cowboys chronology
Global Balalaika Show (2003)	Zombies Paradise (2006)	007 Villain Club by Swatch (2008)

Singles from Zombies Paradise
- 1. "Der Lachende Vagabund" Released: 2004; 2. "You're My Heart, You're My Soul" Released: 2006

Zombies Paradise is a 2006 cover album by the Leningrad Cowboys.

== Track listing ==
No.	Title	Writer(s)	Length
1.	"You're My Heart, You're My Soul"	Steve Benson	3:30
2.	"What is Love"	Dee Dee Halligan/Junior Torello	3:19
3.	"Goldfinger"	John Barry/Leslie Bricusse/Anthony Newley	4:06
4.	"Perfect Day"	Lou Reed	3:52
5.	"Puttin' on the Ritz"	Irving Berlin	2:53
6.	"Manic Monday"	Prince	2:33
7.	"Starman"	David Bowie	4:24
8.	"Ring of Fire"	June Carter/Merle Kilgore	3:11
9.	"My Sharona"	Doug Fieger/Berton Averre	3:45
10.	"Play That Funky Music"	Robert Parissi	5:36
11.	"Fire"	Arthur Brown/Vincent Crane/Mike Finesilver/Peter Ker	3:15
12.	"Der Lachende Vagabund"	Jim Lowe/Peter Moesser	3:59
13.	"Happy Together (2006 Version)" (Bonus track)	Garry Bonner/Alan Gordon	3:02
14.	"Happy Together (Original)" (Bonus track on some versions)	Bonner/Gordon	2:49

== Personnel ==
The Leningrad Cowboys:

- Tipe Johnson – vocals
- Sakke Järvenpää – vocals
- Jay Kortehisto – Trombone, vocals
- Marzi Nyman – Guitar, vocals (lead vocals on track 10)
- Pemo Ojala – trumpet, vocals
- Petri Puolitaival – Tenor sax, vocals
- Mauri Sumén – keyboards, accordion, vocals
- Timo Tolonen – Bass, vocals
- Tume Uusitalo – Guitar, vocals
- Varre Vartiainen – guitar, vocals

Additional musicians:

- Johanna Försti – backing vocals on tracks 1,3,4,7-9,11
- Marika Tuhkala – backing vocals on tracks 1,3,7-9,11
- LoLife – rap and additional programming on track 5
- Aake Kalliala – laughter on track 12

Additional choir arrangements on tracks 1,3,11 by Mauri Sumén. Performed by Controes Minores conducted by Hannu Norjanen

== Singles ==
=== "Der Lachende Vagabund" ===
CD
Leningrad Cowboys Ltd/ LCPROMO (Finland) [promo]

1. "Der Lachende Vagabund"
2. "Pretty Fly (For a White Guy)" [live]
3. "Kashmir" [live]

=== You're My Heart, You're My Soul" ===
CD
Sony BMG/82876842532 (Finland)

1. "You're My Heart, You're My Soul" - 3:31
2. "Happy Together (2006)" - 2:55
3. "Happy Together (Original)" - 2:49
  - Feat, The Alexandrov Red Army Ensemble
