= Absoluuttinen Nollapiste =

Finnish progressive rock band

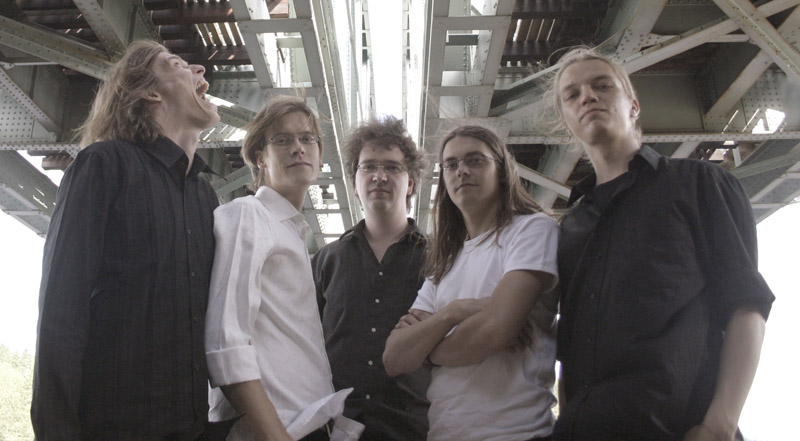
- From left: Aake Otsala, Tomi Krutsin, Aki Lääkkölä, Tommi Liimatta, Janne Hast.

Background information
- Origin: Rovaniemi (1991–1997), Tampere (1997–present), Finland
- Genres: Progressive rock, Finnish rock
- Years active: 1991–present
- Labels: Vinylmania (until 1994); Johanna Kustannus (1995–present)
- Members: Tommi Liimatta; Aki Lääkkölä; Aake Otsala; Tomi Krutsin
- Past members: Janne Hast (2003–2011); Teemu Eskelinen (1997–2001); Jukka Leinonen (1991–1992); Matti Kettunen (1991)
- Website: absoluuttinennollapiste.fi

Absoluuttinen Nollapiste (Finnish for absolute zero) is a progressive rock band from Rovaniemi, Finland. It is known for combining catchy melodies and solid, slightly progressive songwriting with Tommi Liimatta's eccentric lyrics.

Liimatta has numerous side projects with some of the band's current members, some ex-members and others. They publish their music under their own Diu Dau Tapes label. The most famous project is Ahkerat simpanssit, who released the album Tervehdys, Maan asukit in 2003.

== History ==
Absoluuttinen Nollapiste started in June 1991, when Liimatta was on his confirmation camp in Nuasjärvi, Sotkamo, when he had an idea of putting together a rock band. The members of the band, who all lived in the same neighborhood in Rovaniemi, were Liimatta (born in Kemi, 1976, vocals and wind instruments), Tomi Krutsin (born in Rovaniemi, 1976, drums) and Aki Lääkkölä (born in Rovaniemi, 1976, guitar and keyboards). They had had other groups before. The band's first bass guitarist, Matti Kettunen, was replaced in November 1991 by Aake Otsala (born in Kuopio, 1976) and, a year later, the second guitarist, Jukka Leinonen left the band. This line-up lasted for about 7 years. Some time in 1999, Teemu Eskelinen joined the band as a backing vocalist.

== Members ==
- Tommi Liimatta (guitar, vocals, recorder)
- Aki Lääkkölä (guitar, keyboards)
- Aake Otsala (bass guitar, vocals)
- Tomi Krutsin (drums)

=== Past members ===
- Janne Hast (keyboards, percussion, trumpet) (2003–2011)
- Teemu Eskelinen (percussion, backing vocals) (September 1999 – December 2001)
- Jukka Leinonen (guitar) (June 1991 – November 1992)
- Matti Kettunen (bass guitar) (June 1991 – November 1991)

== Discography ==
=== Albums ===
- Neulainen Jerkunen (1994)
- Muovi antaa periksi (1995)
- Simpukka-amppeli (1998)
- Suljettu (1999)
- Olos (2000)
- Nimi muutettu (2002)
- Seitsemäs sinetti (2003)
- Mahlanjuoksuttaja (2005)
- Iiris (2007)
- Musta hiekka (2009)
- Pisara ja lammas 1 (2012)
- Pisara ja lammas 2 (2014)

=== EPs / singles / compilations ===
- "Demo I" (1992) (demo)
- "Demo II" (1993) (demo)
- "Nukahtaa-murre-tosiasia" (1993) (demo)
- Ei ilmestynyt (1994) (EP)
- "Sivulla jatkuu" (1995)
- "Savu meihin" (1996)
- "Ajoratamaalaus" (1997)
- "Silti" (1998)
- "Kupit on kuin olisi häät" (1999)
- "Sukututkimus lannistaa" (1999)
- "Kotiinpaluu, jotenkin" (2000)
- "Hyviä muistoja, huomenna suihkuun" (2001)
- Olen pahoillani – valitut teokset 1994–2000 (2001) (compilation)
- "Irene Kaktus" (2002)
- "Pyhä Nynny" (2002)
- "Mustaa ei ole" (2003)
- "Täytyy muistaa (tapaus Foliosurmat)" (2003)
- "Jarrutan" (2004)
- "Romanttinen komedia" (2004)
- Sortovuodet 1994–2004 (2004) (compilation)
- "Miten tässä vielä käy?" (2005)
- Lihassa ja taivaassa (2007) (EP)
- "Demo 3" (2011)

=== DVDs ===
- Arkistokuvaa 1992–2008 (2009)

=== Solo albums ===
- Tommi Liimatta: Liimatan Pan alley (1996)
- Tommi Liimatta: Tropical Cocktail (2006)
- Tommi Liimatta: Rokokoo Computer (2016)
