= Nick Tesco =

British musician (1955–2022)

- Also known as: Nick Lightowlers
- Born: Nicholas Guy Lightowlers; 3 October 1954
- Origin: Belfast, Northern Ireland
- Died: 26 February 2022 (aged 67)
- Genres: Rock; pop; punk
- Occupations: Singer; songwriter; producer; actor
- Instrument: Vocals
- Years active: 1976–2009

Nick Lightowlers (1955 – 26 February 2022) was a British performer, lyricist, producer, and music industry professional better known to many by his stage name Nick Tesco, the lead singer of the Members.

== Career ==
As a founding member and co-songwriter of the Members, Tesco fronted the band from 1976 until his departure and the subsequent split of the band in 1983. The Members, from Camberley, Surrey, signed with Virgin Records at the tail-end of punk in 1978 and had a No. 12 hit with the single "The Sound of the Suburbs". Co-written by Tesco and Jean-Marie Carroll, the single reportedly sold 250,000 copies and went on to become a staple of punk compilations.

After leaving the band, Tesco co-performed and released the 1983 single "Cost of Living" for UK based independent label Albion Records with J. Walter Negro.

Albion Records was a label he had previously worked for as a producer (the 1981 Outpatients single "New Japanese Hairstyles") and it was as a producer that he continued to work for the remainder of the decade – extensively for CBS, but also East West, WEA and Ariola.

In 1989, he appeared in Leningrad Cowboys Go America, written and directed by Aki Kaurismäki, a film about a fictional Russian rock band touring the US. This fictional band then toured and recorded in real life from 1990 until 1994. Leningrad Cowboys Go America was followed five years later by a sequel, Leningrad Cowboys Meet Moses (1994) and a concert film Total Balalaika Show (1994).

In 1998, he joined Music Week and produced the Music Week Directory from 1999 until 2009 He appeared on BBC 6's Roundtable. He also appeared in other films such as Iron Horsemen and I Hired a Contract Killer.

In 2007, the Members reformed and toured the UK.

== Death ==
Lightowlers died aged 67 on 26 February 2022.
