= Silu Seppälä =

Finnish bassist and actor (1954–2025)

Antti Juhani "Silu" Seppälä (20 September 1954 – 15 September 2025) was a Finnish bassist and actor.

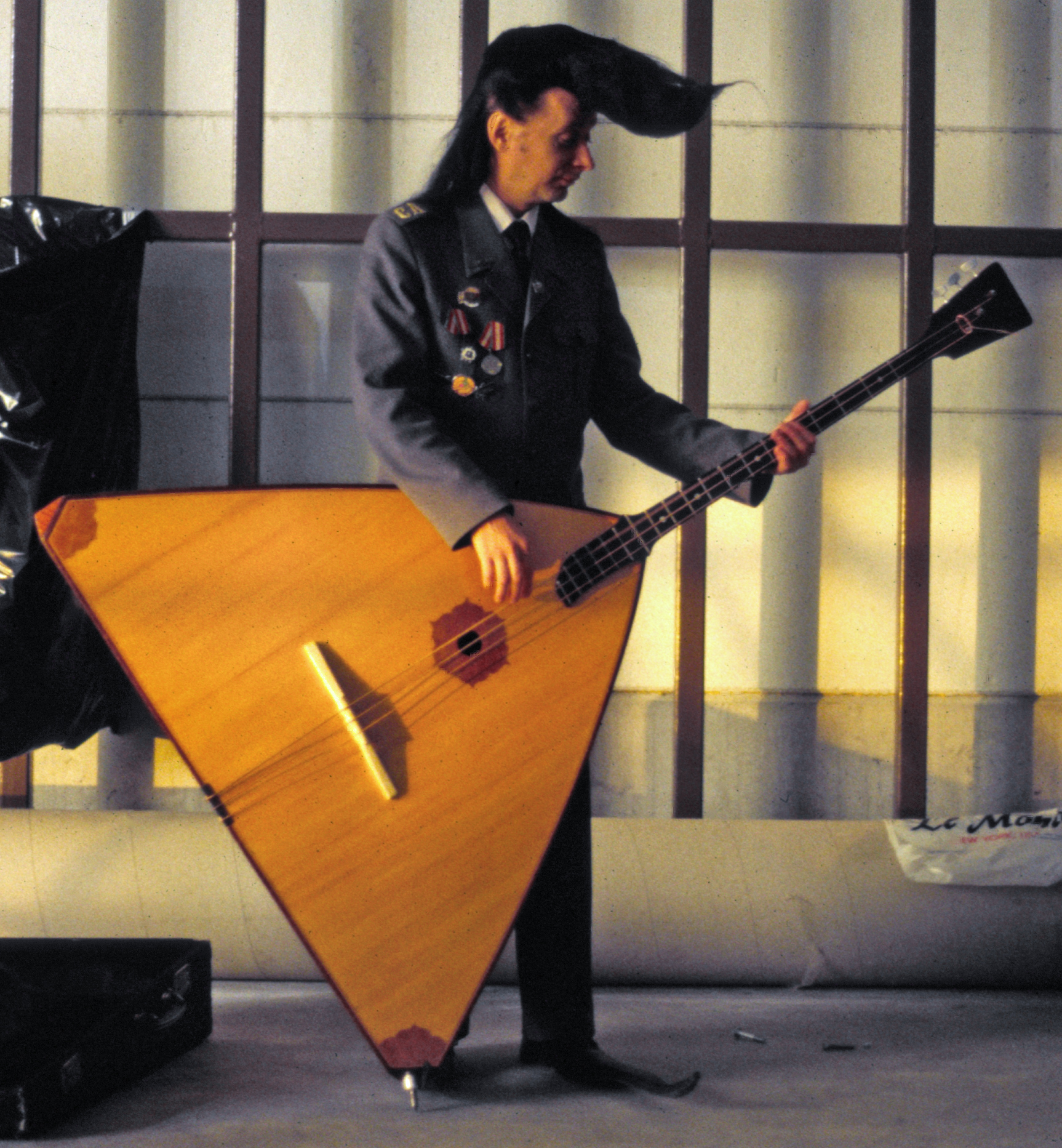
Silu Seppala with the Leningrad Cowboys in 1995

== Life and career ==
Seppälä played in the bands Fast Beethovens, Problems?, Sleepy Sleepers, Lapinlahden Linnut, and Leningrad Cowboys. As a composer, he worked with the Sleepy Sleepers and the Leningrad Cowboys. In addition, Seppälä composed a song for Outi Poppi titled "The Man Who Knows". Seppälä moved to Lappeenranta in 2001 and worked at the Lappeenranta City Theatre.

Seppälä's debut role as a film actor was in the film Wonder Man, directed by Antti Peippo. He played minor roles in Aki Kaurismäki's films, but his lead performance in Mika Kaurismäki's film Zombie and the Ghost Train (1991) earned him the Jussi Award and the Best Actor in Europe award at the San Sebastián Film Festival. In addition, he participated in the script and direction of numerous series, such as Trabant Express.

Seppälä died in September 2025.
