= Rocky VI (1986 film) =

1986 Finnish film

- Directed by: Aki Kaurismäki
- Screenplay by: Aki Kaurismäki
- Produced by: Aki Kaurismäki; Atte Blom
- Starring: Silu Seppälä; Sakari Kuosmanen
- Cinematography: Timo Salminen
- Edited by: Aki Kaurismäki; Raija Talvio
- Production companies: Villealfa Filmproductions; Megamania Musiikki
- Distributed by: Nordic Film Group
- Release date: 1986
- Running time: 8 minutes
- Country: Finland
- Language: English

Rocky VI (Роки in cyrillic) is a 1986 English-language Finnish short musical parody film co-produced, written and directed by Aki Kaurismäki, which parodies the 1985 Sylvester Stallone movie Rocky IV known for its strong Cold War theme. The 8 minutes long film in black and white functions as a music video for the song Rocky VI by the Leningrad Cowboys, a comedy rock and roll band based in Finland, not in neighbouring USSR-era Leningrad, with the original name Saint Petersburg being restored in 1991.

The film stars Antti Juhani "Silu" Seppälä (future bass player of the Leningrad Cowboys, some 5'5" or 1.65 meter) as Rocky and Sakari Kuosmanen (future Cowboys singer, 6'3 or 1.9m) as Igor, his bushy eyebrow Soviet opponent travelling in a GAZ-13 Chaika limousine. The two boxers fight at Töölö Sports Hall in Helsinki. Unlike the original, in which the underdog Rocky prevails at the end, the much bigger Igor quickly knocks out skinny Rocky and wins the match before fighting the referee as well as the judges and bystanders.

Rocky VI is still shown at many film festivals. In 2004, the film was screened at Finále Plzeň in the Czech Republic and at Xèntric at the Center of Contemporary Culture of Barcelona in Spain. In 2007, the film was screened at the Tampere Film Festival as part of a Kaurismäki retrospective.

In the title, the letters VI do not actually represent number six, but a reversed IV, of Rocky IV, the specific film parodied.
