= Go Space =

Studio album by Leningrad Cowboys and the Alexandrov ensemble
- Released: 1996
- Label: Megamania
- Producer: Leningrad Cowboys

Leningrad Cowboys and the Alexandrov ensemble chronology
Nokia Balalaika Show (1995)	Go Space (1996)	Mongolian Barbeque (1997)

Singles from Go Space
- 1. "Jupiter Calling" Released: 1996; 2. "Where's The Moon" Released: 1996

Go Space is a 1996 studio album by the Leningrad Cowboys. It differed from all their previous live and studio releases in that it consisted of original songs, while previous albums were composed mostly of covers of hit songs by other artists.

== Track listing ==
No.	Title	Writer(s)	Length
1.	"Where's the Moon"	Ben Granfelt/Jore Marjaranta/Richard Johnson	3:50
2.	"Space Tractor"	Markku Petander/Johnson	3:28
3.	"Universal Fields"	Esa Niiva/Mato Valtonen/Sakke Järvenpää/Johnson	3:28
4.	"Jupiter Calling"	P. Gessle	3:01
5.	"Galina"	V. Kääpä/Granfelt/T.P. Ojala/Valtonen	3:13
6.	"Leningrad"	Granfelt/Johnson	5:03
7.	"Ulan Bator Girls"	Mauri Sumén/Valtonen/Järvenpää/Johnson/Granfelt	3:16
8.	"Brave New World"	Granfelt	3:30
9.	"Nadja"	Petander/Johnson/Järvenpää/Valtonen	4:06
10.	"Matushka"	Granfelt	4:06
11.	"Zastarovje"	Granfelt/Marjanata	3:58
12.	"L.A. Doga Beach"	K. Ekblad/Granfelt/P. Thomasson	4:01
13.	"Little Green Men"	Granfelt/Johnson/Valtonen/Järvenpää	2:43
14.	"Showtime" (Japanese bonus track)	Ganfelt/Marjanata/Leningrad Cowboys	3:12

== Personnel ==
The Leningrad Cowboys:

- Twist Twist Erkinhariju – drums
- Ben Granfelt – guitar
- Sakke Järvenpää – vocals
- Vesa Kääpä – guitar
- Jore Marjaranta – vocals
- Esa Niiva – saxophone
- Pemo Ojala – trumpet
- Silu Seppälä – bass
- Mauri Sumén – accordion, keyboards
- Mato Valtonen – vocals

The Alexandrov Red Army Ensemble:

- Valeri Gavva – bass vocals
- Vladimir Gusev – dorma
- Aleksandr Hristachev – bass vocals
- Ilja Kosarevskij – balalaika
- Vladimir Prohorov – dorma
- Dimitrij Somov – administration
- Vasilij Stefutsa – tenor vocals
- Viktor Temerev – balalaika
- Aleksandr Toschev – tenor vocals

The Leningrad Ladies:

- Mari Hatakka – backing vocals on "Galina"
- Tiina Isohanni – backing vocals on "Galina"

Richard G. Johnson – additional voices

Additional musicians:

- Paavo Maijanen – backing vocals and bas on "I Hate You" intro/outro
- T.T. Oksala – loops and samples
- Heikki Kangasniemi – fiddle on "Emerald Blues"
- Tatu Kemppainen – guitar and mandolin on "Emerald Blues"
- Kurt Lindblad – tin whistle on "Emerald Blues" and "Bumpersticker Rock"
- Puka Oinonen – saw on "Lumberjack Lady"
- Mika Salo – guitar solo on "Mardi Gras Ska"
- Julle Ekblad – backing vocals on "There's Someone Smiling Down on Me"

== Singles ==
=== "Where's the Moon" ===
CD: Johanna Kustannus/1000 120432 (Finland)

1. "Where's the Moon" – 3:49
2. "Universal Fields" – 3:32

CD: BMG Ariola/74321 35645 2 (Germany)

1. "Where's the Moon" – 3:49
2. "Universal Fields" – 3:32
3. "Answering Machine Messages (bonus track)

- "Just a Moment" – 0:56
- "You Are Just a Mobilephone" – 0:39
- "Drunken Bitch" – 0:56
- "Hello Loser!" – 0:48
- "Mr. Seppälä - The Healthnut" – 0:23
- "Outerspace" – 0:29

=== "Jupiter Calling" ===
CD: BMG Ariola/74321 36126 2 (Germany)

1. "Jupiter Calling" – 3:00
2. "Galina" – 3:13
3. "Showtime" – 3:08

== Charts ==
Chart (1996)	Peak position
Austrian Albums (Ö3 Austria)	48
Finnish Albums (Suomen virallinen lista)	2
German Albums (Offizielle Top 100)	88
