= Varre Vartiainen =

Finnish guitarist (born 1974)

Varre Vartiainen (born 30 September 1974 in Kerava) is a Finnish guitarist and composer who has studied in the Sibelius Academy of Music. He has been a long time member of the bands Sleepy Sleepers, Leningrad Cowboys and Dallapé and has had own bands such as Husband. He has garnered a reputation as a versatile and skilled guitarist. In 2022 he suffered a stroke, yet he kept on working hard. In 2025 it was reported he is studying for a PhD in the Sibelius Academy.
