= Leningrad Cowboys Meet Moses =

- German theatrical poster
- Directed by: Aki Kaurismäki
- Written by: Sakke Järvenpää; Aki Kaurismäki; Mato Valtonen
- Produced by: Aki Kaurismäki; Reinhard Brundig; Paula Oinonen; Fabienne Vonier
- Starring: Matti Pellonpää; Kari Väänänen; André Wilms; Nicky Tesco; The Leningrad Cowboys
- Cinematography: Timo Salminen
- Edited by: Aki Kaurismäki
- Music by: Mauri Sumén
- Distributed by: Pandora Filmproduktion
- Release date: 16 February 1994
- Running time: 94 minutes
- Countries: Finland; Germany; France
- Language: English

Leningrad Cowboys Meet Moses is a 1994 film directed by Aki Kaurismäki. It is a sequel to the popular 1989 film Leningrad Cowboys Go America that introduced the fictional Russian rock band Leningrad Cowboys which, subsequently, became a notable real life rock band in Finland.

== Plot ==
Picking up where Leningrad Cowboys Go America left off, the band has settled in Mexico after charting a top ten hit there. However, many band members become alcoholics spending most of their day drinking tequila. Before long, more than half of the band members have died from excessive drinking. The surviving five members and their road manager Igor have, in the meantime, become naturalized Mexicans, complete with mustaches and Mexican wardrobes.

Down on their luck and out of practice, the band receive an anonymous telegram, inviting them to perform at a hotel at Coney Island in New York. When they arrive, they reunite with their ex-manager Vladimir who claims to be born again and now calls himself Moses. Moses gathers the group at his room, and plans a return trip to the Promised Land (Siberia), for purposes that are explained later. Four band members prepare a makeshift boat for the first leg of the journey; the fifth—the cousin they met in Texas—chooses to stay. Moses stows away on the wing of a plane, taking with him the Statue of Liberty's nose as a souvenir. The stolen nose attracts the attention of Johnson, a CIA agent.

Moses falls off the plane and meets up with the band at a beach. Several friends and relatives from Siberia—new band members—arrive in a rented bus to pick them up. Because their rubles have no value, Moses goes to secure the band gigs for money throughout the journey eastward. Johnson catches up with them at a hotel in Amiens and, posing as a record producer, distracts them with money to play a show at the hotel, while he goes to take the nose back. However, he is caught by Igor and knocked unconscious. The next day, Moses learn of Johnson's real identity and confiscates the bullets from his gun. The band takes him for the rest of the trip, but are unsure of what to do with him.

In Frankfurt, a gas station attendant recognizes Moses from a 'wanted' poster, and has the band arrested. Igor is able to bust them out with help from some local delinquents. The band play a show for a small crowd before they set off again. In Leipzig, Moses and a fellow band member exchange phrases from the Bible and Communist Manifesto respectively. Later, they both tell the others of the birth of a sacred calf in their homeland, the reason for their journey home.

Meanwhile, Johnson is abandoned after trying to take the unattended bus to a US Army base, left with only a Holy Bible. Unable to kill himself with his empty gun, he opens the Bible and reads. He rejoins the band in the Czech Republic, claiming to be born again as well, renaming himself Elijah. Moses welcomes him, in exchange for cigarettes, and he later proves to be a good singer. While in the area, the band visit a tractor factory and perform for a local family.

In Poland, both Moses and Elijah show signs of slipping back to their former identities: When one band member gets sick, Moses claims they don't have enough money to hire a hospital, but the band doesn't believe him. Elijah threatens the band at gunpoint to ditch the nose, but is once again knocked out. After playing for money, the band leaves their sick member by a hospital doorstep. Moses, in an effort to regain the band's trust, goes to make money at a hotel billiard hall, earning enough to pay the hospital in full the following morning.

At the border to Russia, Moses states that, according to The Holy Bible, he never sees the promised land. As Vladimir once again, he turns in empty bottles to the customs office as a distraction while the others sneak the bus across the border. Home at last, the band leaves gifts for the newborn calf. A party is held that evening to celebrate their return. Elijah is left alone with the nose.

== Cast and characters ==
- Leningrad Cowboys – themselves
- Matti Pellonpää – Moses/Vladimir
- Kari Väänänen – Igor, the mute road manager
- André Wilms – Lazar/Johnson/Elijah, the CIA agent
- Nicky Tesco – The American cousin
- Aki Kaurismäki - factory worker (uncredited cameo)

== Music ==
There has not been a soundtrack album released for this film. Music credited in the film include:

- "Rosita" – Written by M. Helminen
- "Nolo Tengo Dinares" – Written by Mauri Sumén
- "Kasatchok" – Traditional, arranged by Leningrad Cowboys
- "Kili Watch" – Written by G. Derse, arranged by Mauri Sumén
- "Wedding March" – Written by Erkki Melartin, arranged by Mauri Sumén
- "Matuschka" – Written by Ben Granfelt, arranged by Mauri Sumén
- "Lonely Moon" – Written by Toivo Kärki (as Pedro de Punta), Reino Helismaa (as Orvokki Itä), English lyrics by H. Tervaharju, arranged by Mauri Sumén
- "I Woke Up This Morning Last Night" – Written by Leningrad Cowboys, M. Helminen, arranged by Leningrad Cowboys
- "Rivers of Babylon" – Written by F. Farian, B. Dove, G. Reyam, J. MacNaugton, arranged by Leningrad Cowboys
- "Uralin pihlaja" – Traditional, arranged by Mauri Sumén
- "The Sunbeam and the Goblin" – Written by Reino Helismaa, English lyrics by Juice Leskinen, arranged by Mauri Sumén
- "U.S. Border" – Written by Tokela, Jouni Marjaranta

== Reception ==
David Stratton in Variety called the film "numbingly unfunny... a major disappointment".

== See also ==
- Cinema of Finland
- List of Finnish films: 1990s
