= Mato Valtonen =

Finnish actor, musician and entrepreneur (born 1955)

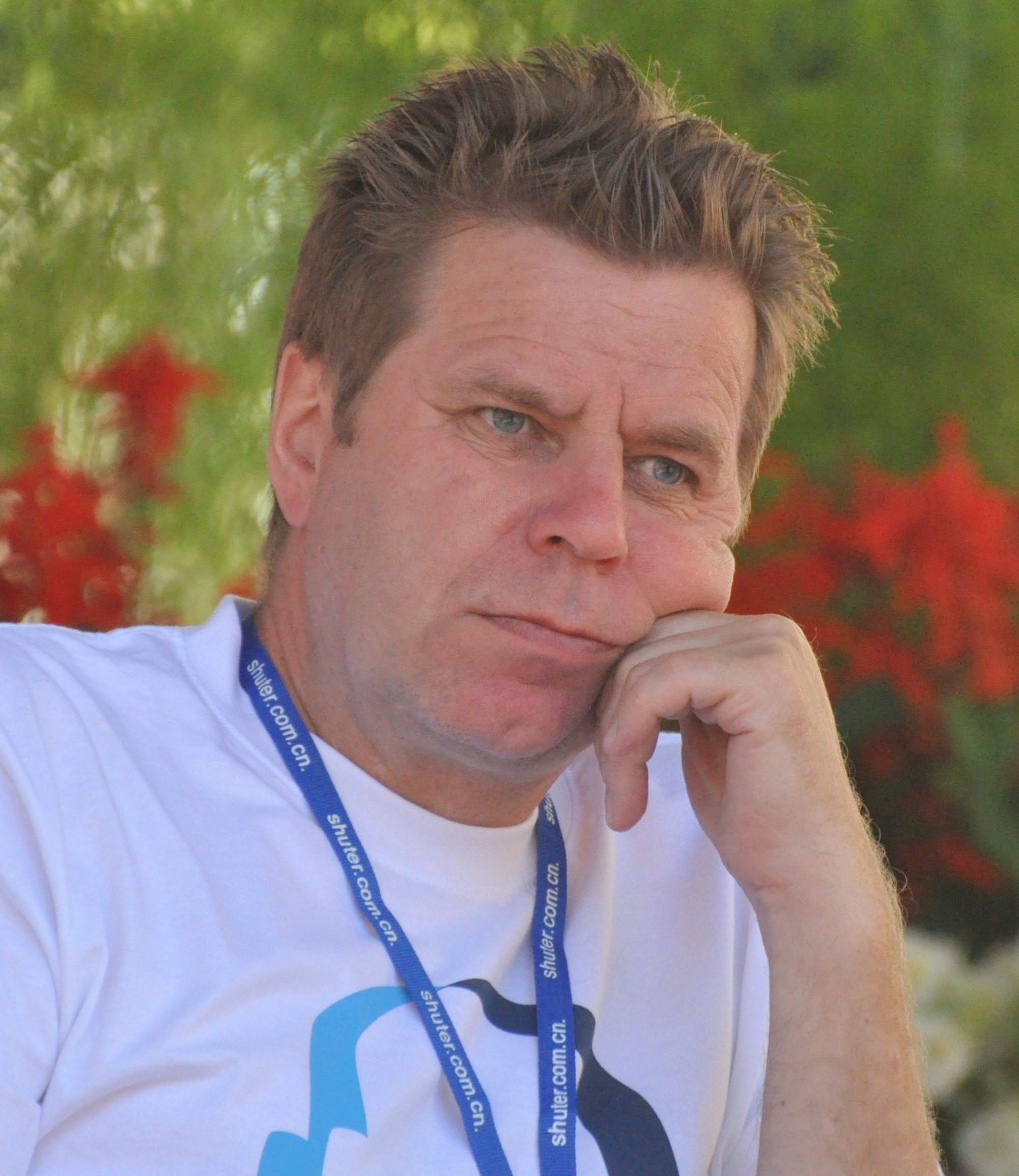
- Mato Valtonen in 2011.
- Born: 21 February 1955 (age 71); Loimaa, Finland
- Occupation: Actor
- Years active: 1985–present

Markku Juhani ”Mato” Valtonen (born 21 February 1955) is a Finnish actor, musician and entrepreneur. Valtonen has been a member of the Finnish band Sleepy Sleepers since 1975 and the Leningrad Cowboys since 1989.

He was the CEO of WAPit telecommunications company from its inception in 1998 until it declared bankruptcy in 2001.

As an actor, Valtonen is best known for starring in Aki Kaurismäki's films starting with 1985's Calamari Union. All of Valtonen's film roles have been in films directed, written, and produced either by Kaurismäki or his older brother Mika. In addition to acting in them, Valtonen also wrote the storylines for Leningrad Cowboys Go America and Leningrad Cowboys Meet Moses.

In 2000 the Finnish Markku Union chose Valtonen as "Markku of the Year", the fourth person to hold the title.

Valtonen's nickname "Mato" means "worm" in Finnish. Valtonen got the nickname at age 14 when he was at a cold summer cabin and crawled around on the floor wrapped in a sleeping bag, resembling a worm.

== Partial filmography ==
- Calamari Union (1985)
- Leningrad Cowboys Go America (1989)
- The Last Border (1993)
- Take Care of Your Scarf, Tatiana (1994)
- Leningrad Cowboys Meet Moses (1994)
- Drifting Clouds (1996)
- L.A. Without a Map (1998)
