= Mongolian Barbeque (album) =

Studio album by Leningrad Cowboys
- Released: 1997
- Label: Megamania

Leningrad Cowboys chronology
Go Space (1996)	Mongolian Barbeque (1997)	Thank You Very Many - Greatest Hits & Rarities (1999)

Mongolian Barbeque is a 1997 studio album by the Leningrad Cowboys.

== Track listing ==
No.	Title	Writer(s)	Length
1.	"There Must Be an Angel (Playing with My Heart)"	Stewart/Lennox	3:35
2.	"Sweet Home Alabama (Stalker Mix)"	R. van Zant/G. Kling/G. Rossington/T. Lindell	4:27
3.	"Enchilada"	V. Kääpä	2:19
4.	"Home Town"	E. Niiva/V.-M. Kallio	3:44
5.	"Have Mercy On Me"	A. Seppälä/V. Kääpä	4:31
6.	"I'm Not An A*****e"	E. Niiva/Mato Valtonen	3:54
7.	"Katjusha (Ula-Mix)"	Traditional; Remixed by T. Lindell	3:56
8.	"Bad Wind"	V.-M. Kallio	3:33
9.	"Drink Beer Polka"	Mauri Sumén/V.-M. Kallio	3:38
10.	"Kasakka-Remix"	Traditional; Remixed by Cream Clinic	4:05
11.	"Ivan The Birdman"	V.-M. Kallio	5:22
12.	"Dschingis Khan" (Japanese bonus track)	Ralph Siegel/Bernd Meinunger	3:11

== Personnel ==
The Leningrad Cowboys:

- Twist Twist Erkinharju - drums
- Sakke Järvenpää - vocals
- Veeti Kallio - vocals
- Tatu Kemppainen - guitar
- Vesa Kääpä - guitar
- Pemo Ojala - trumpet
- Silu Seppälä - bass
- Mauri Sumén - keyboards, accordion
- Mato Valtonen - vocals
- Mari Hatakka - Go-Go and vocals
- Tiina Isohanni - Go-Go and vocals

== EP ==
An EP of the same name was released in Finland to support this album.

CD
Megamania/1000 121432 (Finland)

1. "There Must Be An Angel"
2. "Bad Wind"
3. "Sweet Home Alabama" (Stalker Mix)
