= 1917–1987 (album) =

Studio album by Leningrad Cowboys
- Released: 1987
- Length: 39:52
- Label: AMT
- Producer: Nick Tesco and Mark Smith, Jeremy Allom

Leningrad Cowboys chronology
1917–1987 (1987)	Leningrad Cowboys Go America (1989)

Singles from 1917–1987
- 1. "L. A. Woman" Released: 1987; 2. "In the Ghetto" Released: 1987

1917–1987 is the first studio album by the Leningrad Cowboys, released in 1987.

== Track listing ==
No.	Title	Writer(s)	Length
1.	"Ballad of the Leningrad Cowboy"	Mark Smith/Nick Tesco	4:08
2.	"L.A. Woman"	Jim Morrison	4:55
3.	"Crash the Door"	Takamaeki - Virtanen/Tesco	4:03
4.	"Thru the Wire"	Silu Seppaelae - Virtanen/Tesco	5:25
5.	"The Beast in Me"	Smith/Tesco	3:28
6.	"In the Ghetto"	Mac Davis	4:43
7.	"Sodom and Gomorra"	Ruohonen - Sumen - Virtanen/Tesco	4:56
8.	"Rocky VI."	Seppaelae - Kuosmanen/Tesco	7:33

== Personnel ==
- Leningrad Cowboys
- Pirjo Laine and Nico Ramsden: Guitar on "The Beast in Me"
- Mixed by Jari Laaanen, Mark Smith and Nick Tesco

== Singles ==
=== "L.A. Woman" ===
7"
AMT/ AMTS-107 (Finland)

1. "L.A. Woman" - 4:54
2. "Thru the Wire" - 5:23

=== "In the Ghetto" ===
12"
AMT/ AMTS 12-108 (Finland)

1. "In the Ghetto" - 4:34
2. "The Beast in Me" - 7:32
