= M1917 =

M1917 may refer to any of a number of types of equipment under the model-year nomenclature:

- M1917 bayonet, the bayonet used with the US M1917 Enfield rifle and later with US Army combat shotguns
- M1917 Browning machine gun, a belt-fed water-cooled machine gun
- M1917 Revolver, a .45 ACP revolver produced by Colt and Smith & Wesson
- M1917 Enfield, an American bolt-action rifle
- M1917 light tank, a light tank in US Army service, a near copy of the Renault FT
- 75 mm gun M1917, a US-manufactured variant of the British QF 18-pounder artillery gun
- M1917 155 mm Gun, a US-manufactured version of the French Canon de 155mm GPF in US service
- M1917 155 mm Howitzer, the French Canon de 155 C modèle 1917 Schneider used in US service
- M1917 Helmet, a modified version of the Brodie helmet
- an update of the first version of the German Stahlhelm steel helmet
- M1917 trench knife

== See also ==
- M1918 Browning Automatic Rifle, adopted in 1917 but designated M1918 to avoid confusion with other M1917 machine guns
