= Live in Prowinzz =

- Original Finnish cover

Live album by Leningrad Cowboys
- Released: 1992
- Recorded: 6 June 1992
- Label: Plutonium

Leningrad Cowboys chronology
We Cum from Brooklyn (1992)	Live in Prowinzz (1992)	Total Balalaika Show – Helsinki Concert (1993)

Alternative cover
- International Cover

Live in Prowinzz is the third album from the Leningrad Cowboys. It was recorded at Provinssirock–festival, Seinäjoki on 6 June 1992. It was released in 1992.

== Track listing ==
No.	Title	Writer(s)	Length
1.	"Säkkijärven Polkka"	Traditional, arr. Mauri Sumén	2:00
2.	"Back In The USSR"	John Lennon, Paul McCartney	3:30
3.	"Fat Bob Dollop"	Costello Jones, M&S Helminen	3:33
4.	"Chasing The Light"	Pekka Virtanen, Nick Tesco	4:03
5.	"Katjusha"	Traditional, arr. Mauri Sumén	3:03
6.	"The Way I Walk"	R. Gotthrer, L. Wray	3:43
7.	"Ilja Limanow - Show"	Traditional, arr. Leningrad Cowboys	2:27
8.	"Thru The Wire"	Silu Seppälä, Pekka Virtanen, Nick Tesco	6:11
9.	"Sabre Dance (Instrumental)"	Aram Khachaturian	4:13
10.	"Elvis Show/Trouble"	Jerry Leiber and Mike Stoller	3:57
11.	"Kasakka"	Traditional, arr. Mauri Sumén	4:48
12.	"L.A. Woman"	Jim Morrison	5:18
13.	"I'm Gonna Roll"	D. Lindholm	2:57
14.	"Born To Be Wild"	Mars Bonfire	4:49
15.	"Those Were The Days"	Traditional, Raskin	5:01
16.	"Tequila"	Chuck Rio	4:40
17.	"Proud Mary"	John Fogerty	3:28
18.	"Sally Is Something Else"	A. Pänttönen, M&S Helminen	3:48
19.	"These Boots (Single Edit)" (International version only)	Lee Hazlewood	3:05
