= Total Balalaika Show =

- Polish theatrical poster
- Directed by: Aki Kaurismäki
- Written by: Aki Kaurismäki
- Produced by: Aki Kaurismäki
- Cinematography: Heikki Ortamo
- Edited by: Timo Linnasalo
- Music by: B. Alexandrov; Tipe Johnson
- Release dates: 19 March 1994 (France, Rouen Nordic Film Festival); 2 July 1994 (Finland)
- Running time: 57 min
- Countries: Finland; Sweden
- Languages: English, Finnish

Total Balalaika Show is a 1994 film by director Aki Kaurismäki, featuring a concert by the Leningrad Cowboys and the Alexandrov Ensemble.

The concert took place on 12 June 1993 on Senate Square in Helsinki, Finland. The event drew a crowd of approximately 70,000 people.

The concert featured an eclectic mix of Western rock and Russian folk music, and folk dancers performing to rock songs.

== Songs ==
The "rockumentary" features 13 songs from the concert:

- Finlandia
- Let's Work Together
- The Volga Boatmen's Song
- Happy Together
- Delilah
- Knockin' on Heaven's Door
- Oh, Field
- Kalinka
- Gimme All Your Lovin'
- Jewelry Box
- Sweet Home Alabama
- Dark Eyes
- Those Were The Days

== DVD release ==
The film is available on three DVD releases. The first, released by Sandrew Metronome in 2004, is for DVD Region 2. The second, released by Facets, is for all regions. The third is by The Criterion Collection in an Eclipse box set with the two original films.

== Soundtrack album ==
Total Balalaika Show – Helsinki Concert

Live album by Leningrad Cowboys and the Alexandrov ensemble
- Released: 1993
- Recorded: 12 June 1993
- Label: Plutonium
- Producers: Mauri Sumén; Pemo Ojala

Leningrad Cowboys chronology
Live in Prowinzz (1992)	Total Balalaika Show (1993)	Happy Together (1994)

Total Balalaika Show – Helsinki Concert is a 1993 live concert album by the Leningrad Cowboys and the Alexandrov Ensemble. It was recorded at Senate Square, Helsinki on 12 June 1993. This concert was also documented on film by Aki Kaurismäki.

== Track listing ==
The album of the concert featured more songs than in the film:

Disc one
No.	Title	Writer(s)	Length
1.	"Finlandia-hymni"	Jean Sibelius	1:15
2.	"It's Only Rock n'Roll"	Mick Jagger, Keith Richards	4:44
3.	"Let's Work Together"	Wilbert Harrison	2:32
4.	"Volga Boatmen"	Traditional, arranged by Boris Alexandrov	4:07
5.	"Happy Together"	Garry Bonner, Alan Gordon	2:49
6.	"Yellow Submarine"	John Lennon, Paul McCartney	3:22
7.	"A Cossack Was Riding Beyond The Duna"	Semyon Klimovski	3:12
8.	"Proud Mary"	John Fogerty	2:53
9.	"Delilah"	Les Reed, Barry Mason	4:17
10.	"Katjusha"	Matvei Blanter, Mikhail Isakovsky	2:43
11.	"Dancing In The Street"	William "Mickey" Stevenson, Marvin Gaye, Ivy Jo Hunter	3:36
12.	"Knockin' on Heaven's Door"	Bob Dylan	6:05

Disc two
No.	Title	Writer(s)	Length
1.	"Oh, Field"	Lev Knipper, Viktor Gusev	2:50
2.	"Sweet Home Alabama"	Ronnie Van Zant, Ed King, Gary Rossington	4:40
3.	"Kalinka"	Traditional; arranged by Boris Alexandrov	5:13
4.	"California Girls"	Brian Wilson	2:43
5.	"Gimme All Your Lovin'"	Billy Gibbons, Dusty Hill, Frank Beard	3:06
6.	"Those Were The Days"	Traditional, Gene Raskin	4:37
7.	"Dark Eyes"	Traditional; arranged by V. Ogarkov	4:44
8.	"Stairway To Heaven"	Jimmy Page, Robert Plant	9:05
9.	"Glory Hallelujah"	William Steffe, Julia Ward Howe	5:20
10.	"Just a Gigolo (I Ain't Got Nobody)"	Irving Caesar, Leonello Casucci, Spencer Williams, Roger A. Graham	5:00

The Japanese release was only one disc and had a different cover.

Japanese track listing
No.	Title	Writer(s)	Length
1.	"Finlandia"	Jean Sibelius	1:15
2.	"It's Only Rock n'Roll"	Mick Jagger, Keith Richards	4:44
3.	"Let's Work Together"	Wilbert Harrison	2:32
4.	"Volga Boatmen"	Traditional; arranged by Boris Alexandrov	4:07
5.	"Happy Together"	Garry Bonner, Alan Gordon	2:49
6.	"Delilah"	Les Reed, Barry Mason	4:17
7.	"Katjusha"	Matvei Blanter, Mikhail Isakovsky	2:43
8.	"Dancing in the Street"	William "Mickey" Stevenson, Marvin Gaye, Ivy Jo Hunter	3:36
9.	"Knockin' on Heaven's Door"	Bob Dylan	6:05
10.	"Oh, Field"	Lev Knipper, Viktor Gusev	2:50
11.	"Sweet Home Alabama"	Ronnie Van Zant, Ed King, Gary Rossington	4:40
12.	"California Girls"	Brian Wilson	2:43
13.	"Gimme All Your Lovin'"	Billy Gibbons, Dusty Hill, Frank Beard	3:06
14.	"Those Were The Days"	Traditional, Gene Raskin	4:37
15.	"Dark Eyes"	Traditional; arranged by V. Ogarkov	4:44
16.	"Stairway to Heaven"	Jimmy Page, Robert Plant	9:05
17.	"Just a Gigolo (I Ain't Got Nobody)"	Irving Caesar, Leonello Casucci, Spencer Williams, Roger Graham	5:00
