= We Cum from Brooklyn =

Studio album by Leningrad Cowboys
- Released: 1992
- Label: Plutonium
- Producers: T. T. Oksala; Leningrad Cowboys

Leningrad Cowboys chronology
Leningrad Cowboys Go America (1989)	We Cum from Brooklyn (1992)	Live in Prowinzz (1992)

Singles from We Cum from Brooklyn
- 1. "Those Were the Days" Released: 1991; 2. "Thru the Wire" Released: 1992; 3. "These Boots" Released: 1993

We Cum from Brooklyn is a 1992 album by the Leningrad Cowboys.

== Track listing ==
No.	Title	Writer(s)	Length
1.	"Those Were the Days"	Traditional, Raskin	4:18
2.	"Fat Bob Dollop"	Costello Jones, M & S Helminen	3:11
3.	"No Sense at All"	R. Heiskanen, J. Hohko, M. Helminen	3:45
4.	"Thru the Wire"	Silu Seppälä, Pekka Virtanen, Nick Tesco	6:13
5.	"Kasakka"	Traditional, arr. Mauri Sumen	3:59
6.	"Sauna"	Timo Järvinen, S. Eerola, S. Jokelainen	2:08
7.	"Katjusha"	Traditional, arr. Mauri Sumen	2:24
8.	"The Way I Walk"	R. Gottehrer, L. Wray	3:59
9.	"Monkey Hat"	D. Lindholm	2:34
10.	"I'm Gonna Roll"	D. Lindholm	3:07
11.	"Sally Is Something Else"	A. Pänttönen	2:39
12.	"Get On"	Aaltonen, Järvinen, Häkkinen	3:02
13.	"Herzilein"	Burkhard & Carola Lüdtke	3:45
14.	"These Boots"	Lee Hazlewood	3:07
15.	"Back in the USSR" (CD bonus track)	John Lennon, Paul McCartney	3:25

== Singles ==
Three singles were released in support of this album

=== "Those Were the Days" ===
CD
BMG Ariola/ 664 878 (Germany)

1. "Those Were the Days"
2. "Get On"
3. "Chasing the Light"

CD
BMG Ariola, Chlodwig/665 308 (Germany)

1. "Those Were the Days" - 4:18
2. "Sauna" (live) - 2:08
3. "Kassaka" (live) - 3:59

=== "Thru the Wire" ===
CD
BMG Ariola, Choldwig/74321 12064 2 (Germany)

1. "Thru the Wire" (Soft Version) - 3:08
2. "Thru the Wire" (Album Version) - 6:13
3. "Sally Is Something Else" - 2:39
4. "Fat Bob Dollop" - 3:11

=== "These Boots" ===
CD
Plutonium/PLUTO 703-CD (Finland)

1. "These Boots" - 3:05
2. "Thru the Wire" - 6:46
3. "Sabre Dance" (instrumental) - 4:14
4. "Life is a Bitch (Elämässä Pitää Olla Runkkua)" - 3:59

This was also released as a promotional EP titled Vodka to promote a Leningrad Cowboys brand of vodka made by Primalco Oy. This came with a book promoting the vodka.

CD
Plutonium/PLUTOXCD 708 (Finland)

1. "These Boots"
2. "Thru the Wire"
3. "Sabre Dance"
4. "Life is a Bitch"
