= Sleepy Sleepers =

Finnish pop-rock-punk-comedy band

- Origin: Lahti, Finland
- Genres: Comedy rock, Punk rock (1977)
- Years active: 1974–1991, 2003–
- Spinoffs: Leningrad Cowboys

Sleepy Sleepers (commonly known as Sliipparit in Finland) is a Finnish pop-rock-punk-comedy band founded in 1974 by its two front-men Sakke Järvenpää and Mato Valtonen in Lahti, Finland. Between 1975 and their break-up in 1990 they recorded and issued a total of 19 albums. Sakke and Mato eventually went on to form and front the internationally successful Leningrad Cowboys.

== See also ==
- List of best-selling music artists in Finland
