= Leningrad Cowboys =

Finnish rock band

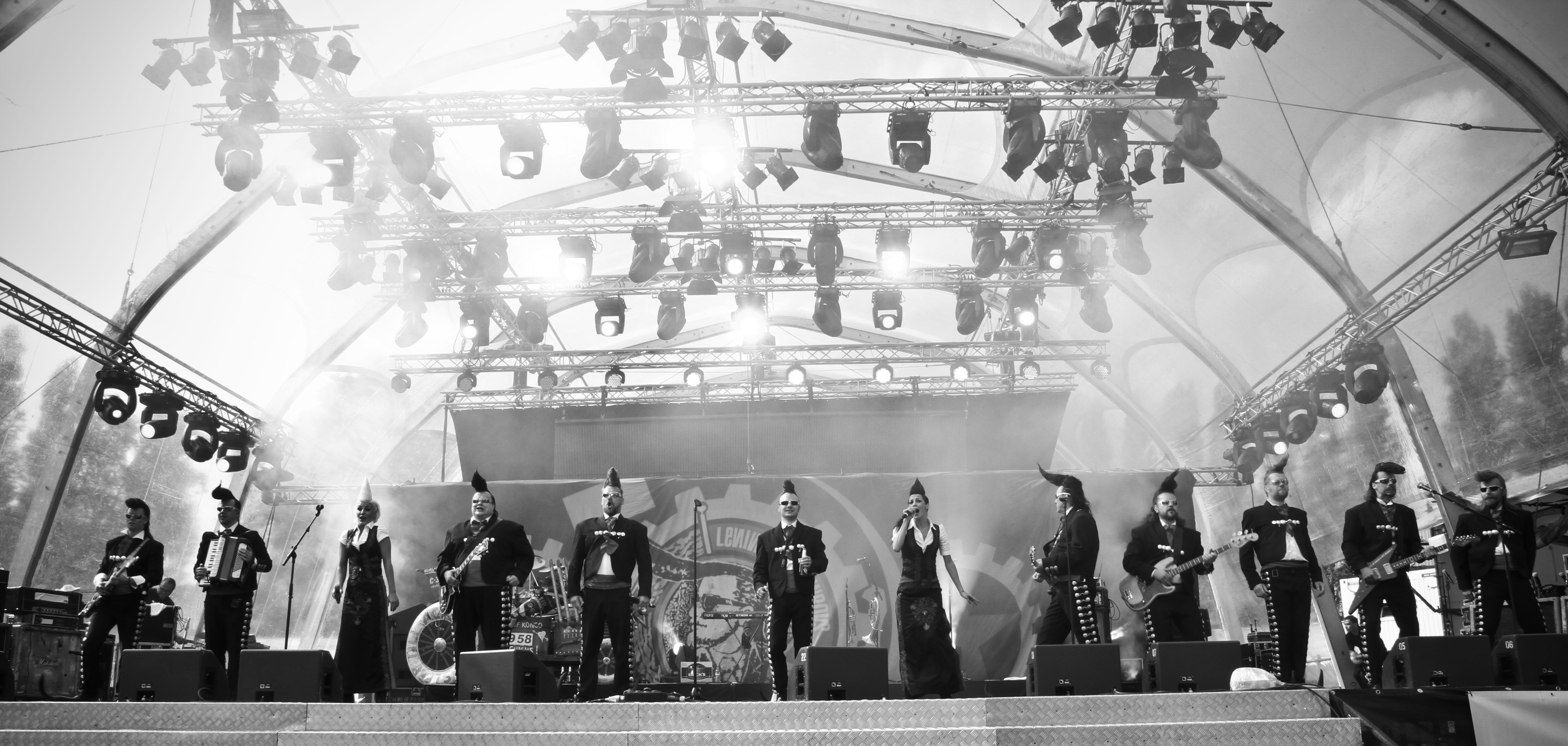

Background information
- Also known as: LC Cowboys
- Origin: Finland
- Genres: Comedy rock; rock 'n' roll; hard rock; heavy metal; glam metal; alternative metal; folk metal; industrial metal
- Years active: 1986–2015, 2025–present
- Labels: Megamania; Plutonium; Johanna Kustannus; SPV; Roadrunner; Sony BMG
- Members: Sakke Järvenpää; Varre Vartiainen; Timo Tolonen; Tume Uusitalo; Ville Tuomi; Pauli Hauta-aho; Sami Järvinen; Okke Komulainen; Anna Sainila; Hanna Moisala; Aino Laakso; Esa Niiva
- Past members: See below
- Website: lc-cowboys.com

The Leningrad Cowboys (also known as LC Cowboys) are a Finnish rock band who perform rock and roll covers of other songs as well as original material. They have exaggerated pompadour hairstyles and wore long pointy shoes. They often worked with the Russian military band the Alexandrov Ensemble.

== Beginnings ==
The band was an invention of the Finnish film director Aki Kaurismäki together with Sakke Järvenpää and Mato Valtonen, members of the Finnish comedy rock band Sleepy Sleepers. The three of them conceived the band in a bar in 1986 as a joke on the waning power of the Soviet Union. The two musicians expressed their wishes that Kaurismäki would direct their first music video, which resulted in the short film Rocky VI (1986). After two further short films, "Thru the Wire" (1987) and "L.A. Woman" (1988), Kaurismäki decided to direct a feature film about them, Leningrad Cowboys Go America (1989).

== After Leningrad Cowboys Go America ==
The band appeared in two subsequent music videos: Those Were the Days (1992) and These Boots (1993), as well as a concert film The Total Balalaika Show (1994) all directed by Kaurismäki.

In 1994, Kaurismäki directed a sequel to Leningrad Cowboys Go America entitled Leningrad Cowboys Meet Moses.

December 2012 saw the release of an animated Christmas video featuring Dog'Y'Dog, a dog resembling the dog from the "You're My Heart, You're My Soul" video. The video also featured a cover of "Christmas in Hollis" from an upcoming Leningrad Cowboys album for Christmas 2013.

Red X-Mas was a tour of Finland by the Leningrad Cowboys and the Russian Air Force Choir from 27 November to 7 December 2013, featuring over 60 performers.

In co-production with Anima Vitae, Leningrad cowboys were producing an animated feature Dog'y'dog featuring the half-Siberian/half-Mexican dog (from their "Christmas in Hollis" music video) traveling from Siberia to Mexico via the US.

Dog'y'Dog also appeared in two games for iOS, Dog ' Y ' Dog Adventures and Dog ' Y ' Dog Chicky Puzzle, and in the Bonehead game for Android developed by Leningrad Cowboys Studios and Fingersoft and released 13 May 2014.

== Hiatus and comeback ==
After a hiatus caused by their difficulties in repaying a loan for mobile game development from Tekes, Leningrad Cowboys Ltd Oy, the band's parent company, went into bankruptcy after being denied the eligibility of corporate restructuring. The band had planned a concert to celebrate the 30th anniversary of the Total Balalaika Show concert in 2023, but the Russian invasion of Ukraine changed plans. In 2025, also due to the invasion, the band changed their name to "LC Cowboys" and announced a comeback tour named Tis is tö komepäk (This is the Comeback) in late 2025 with an American choir, Harlem Angels. A new Christmas album with Harlem Angels, Christmas Gift, was released digitally 7 November 2025 with vinyl and CD releases due to follow.

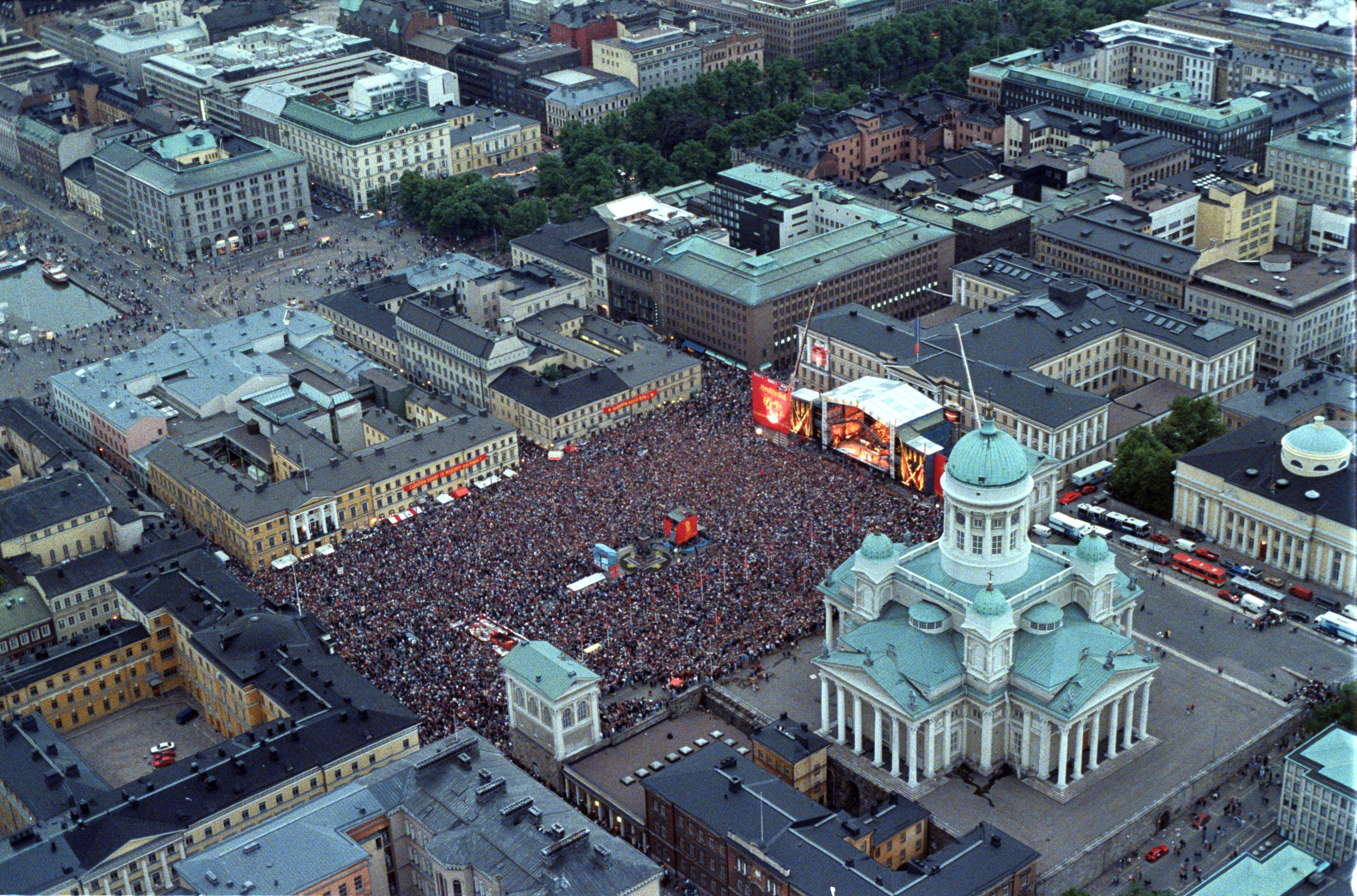
“Total Balalaika Show” of the Leningrad Cowboys and the Red Army Choir in 1993

== Band members ==
Current members

- Sakke Järvenpää: vocals (1986–2015, 2025-present)
- Varre Vartiainen: guitar (2003–2015, 2025-present)
- Timo Tolonen: bass (2003–2015, 2025-present)
- Tume Uusitalo: vocals, guitar (2003–2015, 2025-present)
- Ville Tuomi: lead vocals (2011–2015, 2025-present)
- Pauli Hauta-aho: guitar (2004–2015, 2025-present)
- Sami Järvinen: drums (2003–2015, 2025-present)
- Okke Komulainen: keyboards, accordion (2011–2015, 2025-present)
- Anna Sainila: dancer, vocals (2011–2015, 2025-present)
- Hanna Moisala: dancer, vocals (2011–2015, 2025-present)
- Aino Laakso (2025-present)
- Esa Niiva (1991-1998,2025-present)

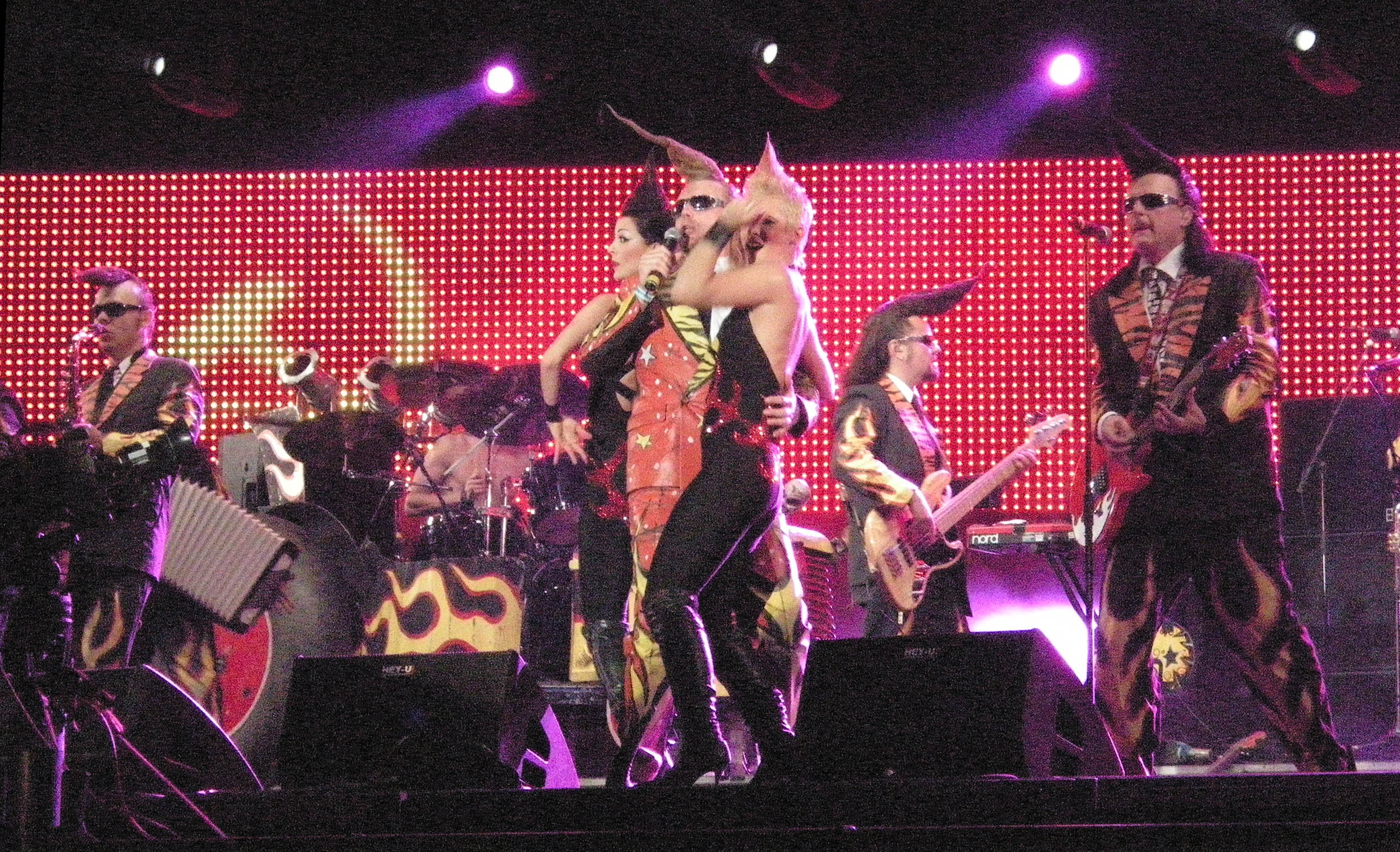
Leningrad Cowboys in 2008

Former members

- Mato Valtonen: vocals (1986–1997)
- Nicky Tesco: vocals (1986–1989)
- Silu Seppälä: bass (1989–2002)
- Mauri Sumén: keyboards, accordion (1989–2006)
- Puka Oinonen: guitar (1989)
- Pimme Korhonen: drums (1989)
- Sakari Kuosmanen: vocals (1989)
- Pekka Virtanen: guitar (1989)
- Ben Granfelt: guitar (1992–1996)
- Esa Niiva: saxophone (1991–1998)
- Teijo "Twist Twist" Erkinharju: drums (1991–2002)
- Vesa Kääpä: guitar (1996–2002)
- Mari Hatakka: Go-Go, vocals (1996–2000)
- Tiina Isohanni: Go-Go, vocals (1996–2000)
- Jore Marjaranta: lead vocals (1989–1996)
- Pemo Ojala: trumpet, Mitten (1991–2013)
- Tatu Kemppainen: guitar (1996–1999)
- Veeti Kallio: vocals (1997)
- Tipe Johnson: vocals (1998–2010)
- Ykä Putkinen: guitar (2000)
- Antti Snellman: Saxophone (2000)
- Marzi Nyman: guitar, vocals (2003–2006)
- Juuso Hannukainen: percussion (2003)
- Sami Järvenpää: vocals (2003)
- Pope Puolitaival: saxophone (2003–2013)
- Jay Kortehisto: trombone (2003–2013)
- Petri Puolitaival: tenor sax, vocals (2006)

== Discography ==
- 1917–1987 (1987)
- Leningrad Cowboys Go America (1989)
- We Cum From Brooklyn (1992)
- Happy Together (1994)
- Go Space (1996)
- Mongolian Barbeque (1997)
- Terzo Mondo (2000)
- Zombies Paradise (2006)
- Buena Vodka Social Club (2011)
- Merry Christmas (2013)
- Christmas Gift (2025)
