= Tommi Liimatta =

Finnish musician, writer and poet

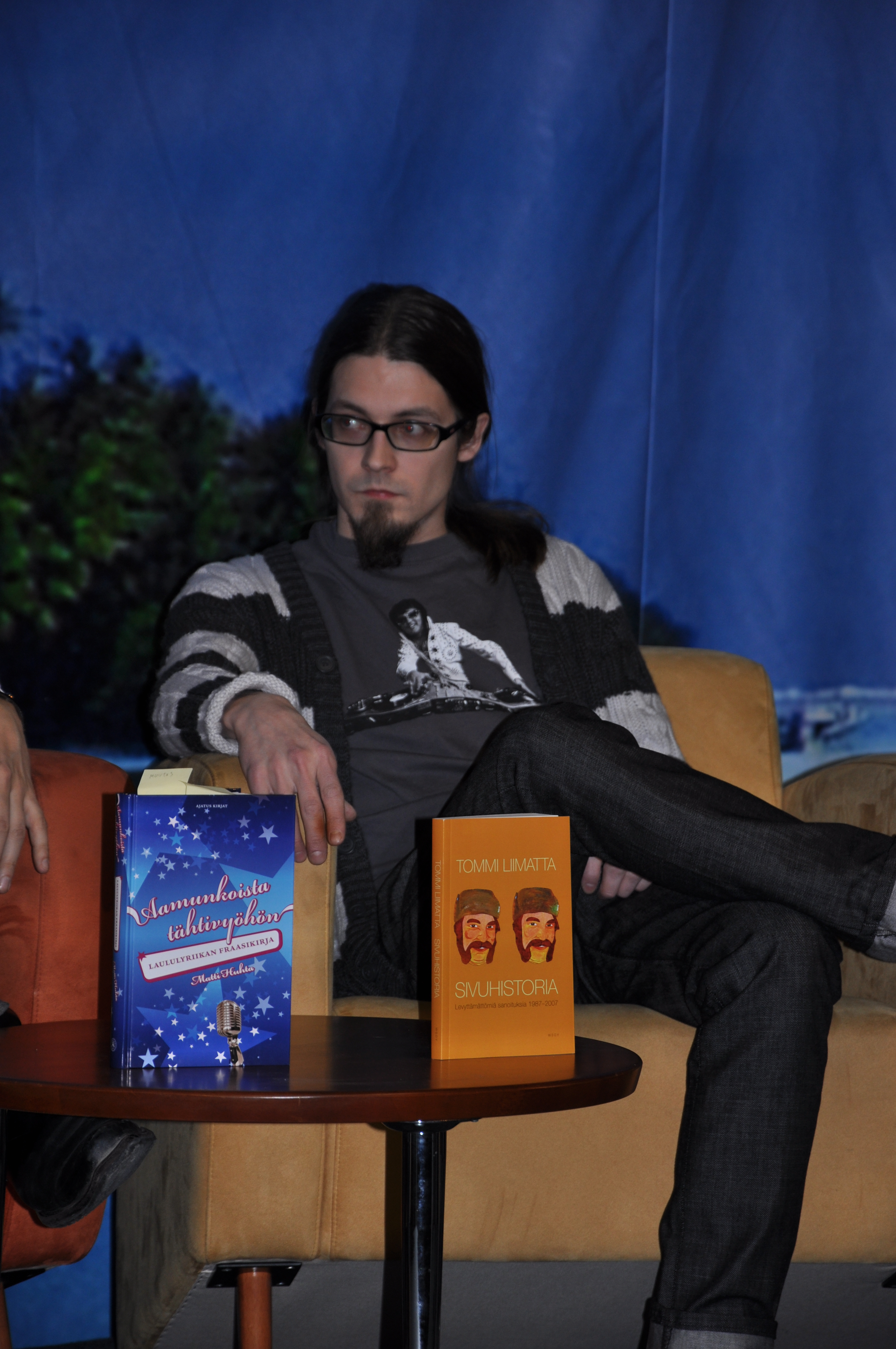
Tommi Liimatta at the Tampere Book Fair 2009

Tommi Liimatta (born 14 January 1976 in Kemi, Finland) is a musician, writer and a poet most famous for being the singer, songwriter and lyricist for the rock group Absoluuttinen Nollapiste. His other works include a novel, a prose poem collection, three comic books and three solo albums (Liimatan Pan Alley, 1996, Tropical Cocktail, 2006 and Rokokoo Computer, 2016). He has also illustrated most of the album covers for Absoluuttinen Nollapiste.

== Bibliography ==
- Avainlastu (WSOY 2002) - collection of aphorisms, prose and prose poetry
- Aksel Sunnarborgin hymy (WSOY 2004) - novel
- Muovikorvo (WSOY 2007) - novel
- Sivuhistoria - Levyttämättömiä sanoituksia 1987-2007 (WSOY 2008) - collection of lyrics
- Nilikki (WSOY 2009)

=== Comic books ===
- Vähän hyviä juttuja '90-'91 (Björklund & Bergman 1999)
- Rengin tarpeet (Renkikustannus 2000)
- Masturbaatio Ranualla (WSOY 2003)
- Ei vaikuta keikkaan (WSOY 2005)

== Solo discography ==
- Liimatan Pan Alley (Johanna kustannus / J. Karppanen 1996)
- Tropical Cocktail (Johanna kustannus / J. Karppanen 2006)
