= Johanna Kustannus =

Finnish record label

The logo of the second Johanna Kustannus

Johanna Kustannus Oy (Ltd) has been the name of two Finnish record labels. Atte Blom has been a founding member for both companies, and Pekka Aarnio has also been involved with both. The first company using the name used the sublabel Johanna, while the second one used Pyramid and Megamania.

== The first Johanna Kustannus Oy ==
The first Johanna Publishing started in 1978 with the publication of Juice Leskinen's, Dave Lindholm's and Kari Peitsamo's lyrics books. When Love Records went bankrupt in 1979, Johanna Kustannus began publishing records. A majority of the bands signed with Love Records transferred over to Johanna Kustannus.

At first the company's name was Musiikki- ja kirjatoimisto P. Karhu, and the company also made a few releases under the sublabel Karhu. The first single released under the label Johanna was "Lontoon skidit" (JHNS 101) by Ratsia, and the first album "Kohdusta hautaan" (JHN 2001) by Tuomari Nurmio ja Köyhien Ystävät. At this time Johanna's releases were being published by Love Kustannus Oy. Johanna Kustannus began publishing its releases in 1981, and in 1982 the company was renamed to Johanna Kustannus Oy. Johanna Records released approximately 40 records in 1981.

=== Other companies behind Johanna label ===
In fall 1982, the names of several other companies began to appear in Johanna's releases' production credits. This included such companies as Ralf Örn Pop and Rockadillo, until a new production company, A. A. B. Tuotanto Oy, was formed. The new company was partially under the same ownership as Johanna Kustannus, but also had ties with Polarvox and Finnvox.

A. A. B. Tuotanto released records from 1982 to 1984. During this time the company released approximately 30 albums by the same Johanna-artists as before. The last release by A. A. B. Tuotanto under the Johanna label was "Rakkauden kiertokulku" (JHN 3039) by Rauli Badding Somerjoki.

=== Bankruptcy ===
Johanna Kustannus went bankrupt in October 1984. The last record released was "Tohtori Pöhön aerobix" (JHN 2512), a project by Sleepy Sleepers. Other records that had been completed by the time of the bankruptcy were released by Love Kustannus under the sublabel Beta. After the bankruptcy Atte Blom continued producing records with the company Megamania Musiikki Ky, releasing records under the sublabels Pyramid and Megamania. The bankruptcy of Johanna Kustannus was finalised in 1989.

== The second Johanna Kustannus Oy ==
When the first Johanna Kustannus' name was removed from the Finnish Trade Register in 1989, Blom immediately formed a second company under the same name. The company had three other owners besides Atte Blom. The new Johanna Kustannus continued in the spirit of the previous Megamania Musiikki Ky, and used the same sublabels Pyramid and Megamania. The company itself claims that the second Johanna Kustannus was formed in 1985, the time when Megamania Musiikki began operating.

The new Johanna Kustannus' capital dropped sharply in the fiscal year 2000, and in summer 2002 the majority of the company's shares were transferred to Love Kustannus Oy through a share offering. Blom resigned from the company in 2005. The current CEO is Sini Perho, who is also the CEO of Love Kustannus.

Currently the company mainly releases Finnish rock music, releasing approximately twenty albums and singles yearly. In 2010, Universal Music Group became the parent company of Johanna Kustannus.

== Artists ==
The first and second Johanna Kustannus shared many of their artists. After the first company went bankrupt, many of the artists continued in the second, and the second company has been re-releasing some of the first company's original releases. The two companies had signed several bands notable in the Finnish music scene, including:

- Arppa
- 22-Pistepirkko
- Absoluuttinen Nollapiste
- Don Huonot
- Hanoi Rocks
- Kotiteollisuus
- Leevi and the Leavings
- Leningrad Cowboys
- Poutahaukat
- Juice Leskinen
- Andy McCoy
- Pelle Miljoona
- Peer Günt
- Raptori
- Rinneradio
- Sleepy Sleepers
- Rauli Badding Somerjoki
- Ultra Bra

== Sources ==
- Muusikko Online 8/2003, Jouni Nieminen: Vanha ja uusi Johanna - levymerkin tarinaa - a history of the two companies in Finnish
