= Midnight Sun Film Festival =

Film festival in Sodankylä, Finland

Coordinates: 67°25′N 026°35′E

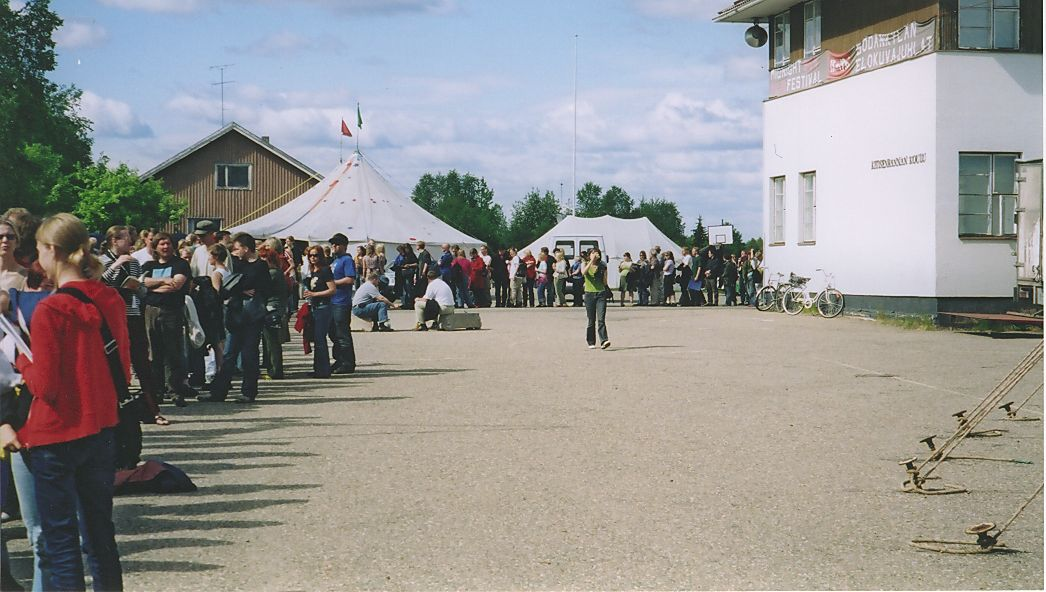
A queue to Rosetta in 2005

The Midnight Sun Film Festival (Finnish: Sodankylän elokuvajuhlat) is an annual five-day film festival in Sodankylä, Finland. The festival usually takes place in the second week of June. One of the main characteristics of the festival is to show films without a break around the clock while the sun shines around the clock.

The Midnight Sun Film Festival is non-competitive. The program consists mostly of films directed by the main guests, 20–30 modern movies from all parts of the world, contemporary Finnish films and cinema classics, some of which are usually presented as "master classes" by various film theory experts. Typically, the festival introduces 4–5 young directors who are also guests of the festival. In recent years, attendance has been between 15,000 and 25,000.

The festival was first arranged in 1986 and the first international director guests were Samuel Fuller, Jonathan Demme, Bertrand Tavernier and Jean-Pierre Gorin. Later on it hosted some of the biggest names in cinema, such as Jim Jarmusch, Krzysztof Kieślowski, Roger Corman, Terry Gilliam, Francis Ford Coppola, Abbas Kiarostami and Miloš Forman.

== Guests ==
Here follows the list of guests who have attended the festival since its first edition:

- 1986: Samuel Fuller, Jonathan Demme, Bertrand Tavernier, Jean-Pierre Gorin
- 1987: Michael Powell, Jacques Demy, Jim Jarmusch, D. A. Pennebaker, Juliet Berto, Thelma Schoonmaker
- 1988: Monte Hellman, Paul Schrader, Dušan Makavejev, Aleksei German, Krzysztof Zanussi, Ali Özgentürk, Helle Ryslinge
- 1989: Paul Morrissey, Krzysztof Kieślowski, Otar Ioseliani, John Berry, Vadim Abrashitov, Idrissa Ouedraogo
- 1990: Richard Fleischer, Manoel de Oliveira, Ettore Scola, Jean-Pierre Léaud, Octávio Bezerra
- 1991: Andre de Toth, Laslo Benedek, Alberto Lattuada, Jean-Charles Tacchella, Agnès Varda, Chantal Akerman, Enzo Serafini, Etienne Chatiliez
- 1992: Roger Corman, Claude Chabrol, Jan Troell
- 1993: Joseph H. Lewis, Dino Risi, Jerzy Kawalerowicz, Julio Medem
- 1994: Robert Wise, Mario Monicelli, Luis García Berlanga, Stanley Donen, John Sayles
- 1995: Robert Parrish, Agnieszka Holland, Maud Linder, Richard Price, Fridrik Thór Fridriksson, Victor Erice
- 1996: Jean Dréville, Claude Sautet, Danièle Dubroux, Robert Boyle, Doris Dörrie
- 1997: Gianni Amelio, Vincent Sherman, Jerzy Skolimowski, István Szabó, Costas Ferris
- 1998: Youssef Chahine, Terry Gilliam, Robby Müller, Stefan Jarl, Wim Wenders, Leonard Kastle
- 1999: Edgardo Cozarinsky, Costa-Gavras, Francesco Rosi, Angela Winkler, Murali Nair
- 2000: Bob Rafelson, Paolo Taviani, Ivan Passer, Shinji Aoyama
- 2001: Freddie Francis, Sergio Sollima, Jerry Schatzberg, Agnès Jaoui
- 2002: Francis Ford Coppola, Miklós Jancsó, Fernando Solanas, Denys Arcand, Luce Vigo
- 2003: Irvin Kershner, Emir Kusturica, Jean Rouch, Matti Kassila
- 2004: Val Guest, Nanni Moretti, Marlen Khutsiev, Wolfgang Becker, Jörn Donner
- 2005: Roy Ward Baker, Jean-Pierre Dardenne, Luc Dardenne, Yeşim Ustaoğlu, Juan Pablo Rebella, Pablo Stoll, Hans Weingartner
- 2006: Gian Vittorio Baldi, Carroll Ballard, Andrei Smirnov, Jafar Panahi, Isabelle Stever, Mercedes Álvarez, Jasmine Trinca
- 2007: Abbas Kiarostami, Claude Goretta, Vittorio De Seta, Giuseppe Bertolucci, Amos Gitai, Elia Suleiman, Pascale Ferran, Detlev Buck
- 2008: Miloš Forman, Andrei Konchalovsky, Seymour Cassel, Lasse Pöysti, Veiko Õunpuu
- 2009: John Boorman, Robert Guédiguian, Fatih Akin, Samira Makhmalbaf, Sergey Dvortsevoy, Andreas Dresen, Markku Lehmuskallio & Anastasia Lapsui
- 2010: Pedro Costa, Terence Davies, Bahman Ghobadi, Vesa-Matti Loiri, Samuel Maoz
- 2011: Michael Chapman, Souleymane Cissé, Atom Egoyan, Apichatpong Weerasethakul
- 2012: Harriet Andersson, Joe Dante, Alan Rudolph, Béla Tarr
- 2013: Philip Kaufman, Marco Bellocchio, Claire Denis, Cristian Mungiu, Jem Cohen, Ahmet Boyacioglu
- 2014: Olivier Assayas, Pawel Pawlikowski, Alain Bergala, Alice Rohrwacher
- 2015: Malgorzata Szumowska, Miguel Gomes, Mike Leigh, Whit Stillman, Christian Petzold, Nils Malmros
- 2016: Jiri Menzel, Fernando Trueba, Jonas Trueba, Bill Forsyth, Dagur Kari, Gianfranco Rosi, David Farr, Malin Buska, The Dodge Brothers
- 2017: Carlos Saura, Bertrand Bonello, Per Fly, Kai Wessel, Hanna Schygulla
- 2018: Barbet Schroeder, Bulle Ogier, Anja Kofmel, Katherina Wyss, Mahamat Saleh Haroun, Olivier Assayas, Thomas Stuber
- 2019: Arnaud Desplechin, Fernando Meirelles, Johann Lurf, Kent Jones, Mark Jenkin, Marzieh Meshkini, Mohsen Makhmalbaf, Nora Fingscheidt, Pernilla August, Shahab Hosseini
- 2022: Ildikó Enyedi, Mathieu Amalric, Lenny Abrahamson, Karim Aïnouz, Nicholas Meyer, Jonas Selberg Augustsén
- 2023: Sergei Loznitsa, Mary Sweeney, Emmanuel Mouret
- 2024: Leos Carax, Alfonso Cuarón, Dag Johan Haugerud, Aslı Özge, Adilkhan Yerzhanov, Alice Rohrwacher
- 2025: Dominique Sanda, Julien Temple, Chris Petit, Athina Rachel Tsangari, Léonor Serraille

== Sodankylä Forever Documentary ==
Co-founder of the festival, Peter von Bagh released a 4-hour documentary based on footage from panel discussions titled Sodankylä Forever. It features clips of various filmmakers discussing the broader impact of films and filmmaking within history and culture. Some of the directors that appear in the documentary include, Miloš Forman, Ivan Passer, Ettore Scola, Michael Powell, Abbas Kiarostami, Jafar Panahi, Elia Suleiman, Francis Ford Coppola, John Sayles, Samuel Fuller, Bob Rafelson and Jonathan Demme.
