= International Women's Film Festival (France) =

Film festival

Coordinates: 48.791°N 2.463°E

The International Women's Film Festival, formerly known as Créteil International Women's Film Festival (in French Festival International de Films de Femmes (FIFF); formerly Festival international de films de femmes de Créteil), also known simply as Films des Femmes, is an annual film festival held in Créteil, France.

== History ==
The Festival international de films de femmes de Créteil was founded by Jackie Buet in 1978 to showcase the directing talents of female filmmakers who, at the time, had difficulty getting their films adequately distributed. The first festival was held in 1979 in Sceaux. It transferred to Créteil in 1985.

As of 2024 it is known as the Festival International de Films de Femmes (FIFF).

== Description ==
Located in Créteil, a city southeast of Paris, today the festival is 10 non-stop days premiering 50 or more new films directed by one or more women. The festival also offers film classes, thematic forums and debates. The competition is open to women from around the world who have made a feature-length documentary, a short length fiction and a documentary film.

The festival offers a number of prizes, including several Audience awards and the "Grand Jury Prize." There is a festival archive containing more than 10,000 films by women.

== Winners of the Grand Prix ==
Year	Title (English)	Title (Original)	Director(s)	Country
1980	Germany Pale Mother	Deutschland bleiche Mutter	Helma Sanders-Brahms	West Germany
1981	Sisters, or the Balance of Happiness	Schwestern oder Die Balance des Glücks	Margarethe von Trotta	West Germany
1982	A Question of Silence	De stilte rond Christine M.	Marleen Gorris	Netherlands
1983	Born in Flames		Lizzie Borden	United States
1984	With a Fixed View of Money	Mit starrem Blick aufs Geld	Helga Reidemeister	West Germany
1985	Kasik Düsmani	La Chambre de mariage	Bilge Olgaç	Turkey
1986	By Touch	Przez dotyk	Magdalena Lazarkiewicz	Poland
1987	Loyalties		Anne Wheeler	Canada / United Kingdom
1988	Business as Usual		Lezli-An Barrett	United Kingdom / United States
1989	Celia		Ann Turner	Australia
1990	Memories of a River	Tutajosok	Judit Elek	Hungary
1991	Vigour	Kracht	Frouke Fokkema	Netherlands
1992	Freud Leaving Home	Freud flyttar hemifrån.	Susanne Bier	Sweden / Denmark
1993	Speak Up! It's So Dark	Tala! Det är så mörkt	Suzanne Osten	Sweden
1994	The Sex of the Stars	Le Sexe des étoiles	Paule Baillargeon	Canada
1995	Eden Valley		Amber Production Team	United Kingdom
1996	Summer Snow	Nu ren si shi	Ann Hui	Hong Kong
1997	Floating Life		Clara Law	Australia
1998	In That Land...	V toy strane...	Lidiya Bobrova	Russia
1999	Happy Birthday	S dnyom rozhdeniya!	Larisa Sadilova	Russia
2000	Seven Songs from the Tundra	Seitsemän laulua tundralta	Anastasia Lapsui, Markku Lehmuskallio	Finland
2001	The Days Between	In den Tag hinein	Maria Speth	Germany
2002	Mostly Martha	Bella Martha	Sandra Nettelbeck	Germany
2003	The Best Day of My Life	Il Più bel giorno della mia vita	Cristina Comencini	Italy
2004	Take My Eyes	Te doy mis ojos	Icíar Bollaín	Spain
2005	Chinese Eye	Sepet	Yasmin Ahmad	Malaysia
2006	Sévigné		Marta Balletbò-Coll	Spain
2007	How Is Your Fish Today?	Jin tian de yu zen me yang?	Xiaolu Guo	China
2008	Mainline	Khoon bazi	Mohsen Abdolvahab, Rakhshan Banietemad	Iran
2009	Knitting	Niu lang zhi nu	Yin Lichuan	China
2010	Pudana: Last of the Line	Sukunsa viimeinen	Anastasia Lapsui, Markku Lehmuskallio	Finland / Russia
2011	Missing Man	Propavshiy bez vesti	Anna Fenchenko	Russia
2012	Invisible	Lo Roim Alaich	Michal Aviad	Israel
2013	Hemel		Sacha Polak	Netherlands / Spain
2014	Broken Hill Blues	Ömheten	Sofia Norlin	Sweden
2015	Objects in Mirror	Ashya dar ayeneh	Narges Abyar, Mohammad Hossein Ghasemi	Iran
2016	Dora or The Sexual Neuroses of Our Parents	Dora oder Die sexuellen Neurosen unserer Eltern	Stina Werenfels	Switzerland
2017	Lipstick Under my Burkha	Lipstick Waale Sapne	Alankrita Shrivastava	India
2018	Medea		Alexandra Latishev Salazar	Costa Rica, Chile, Argentina
2019	The Chaotic Life of Nada Kadić	La Caótica vida de Nada Kadić	Marta Hernáiz Pidal	Mexico
2020	Not Presented			
2021	Quo Vadis, Aida?		Jasmila Žbanić	Bosnia and Herzegovina
2022	Clara Sola		Nathalie Álvarez Mesén	Sweden, Costa Rica, Belgium, Germany
2023	Trenque Lauquen		Laura Citarella	Argentina, Germany
2024	Kalak		Isabella Eklöf	Denmark, Norway, Netherlands, Sweden, Finland, Greenland
2025	Sugar Island		Johanné Gómez Terrero	Dominican Republic, Spain

== See also ==
- Bordeaux International Festival of Women in Cinema, 1999–2005
- List of women's film festivals
- Women's cinema
- Woman's film
- Women in film
- Feminist film theory
- List of female film and television directors
- List of female film directors
- Black women filmmakers
