= List of submissions to the 73rd Academy Awards for Best Foreign Language Film =

2000 Best Foreign Language Film submissions
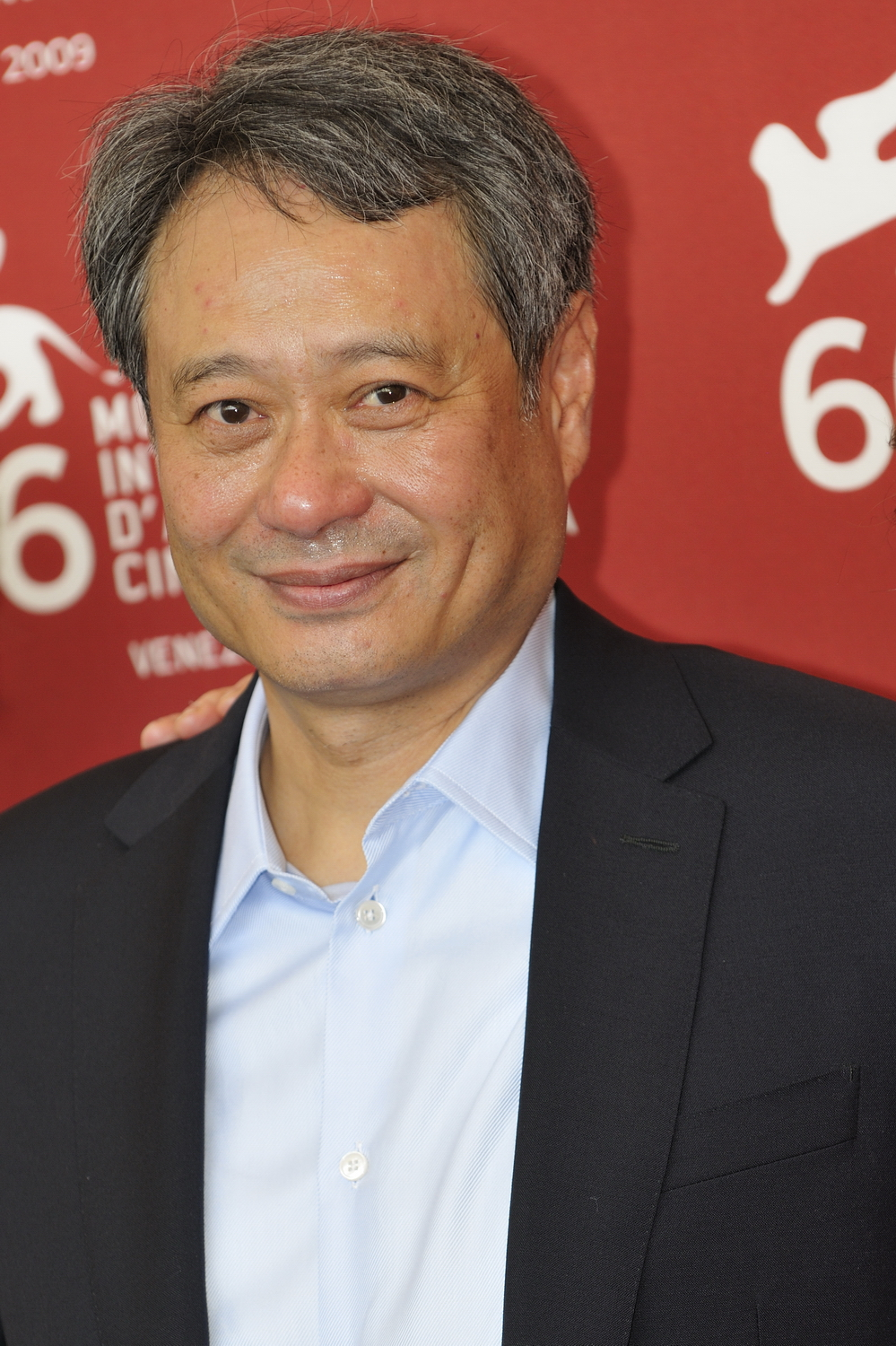
- Ang Lee directed Crouching Tiger, Hidden Dragon, which won the year's award.

Highlights
- Oscar winner: (Taiwan) Crouching Tiger, Hidden Dragon
- Submissions: 46
- Debuts: 1
- Total eligible: 46

This is a list of submissions to the 73rd Academy Awards for the Best Foreign Language Film. The Academy of Motion Picture Arts and Sciences (AMPAS) has invited the film industries of various countries to submit their best film for the Academy Award for Best Foreign Language Film every year since the award was created in 1956. The award is presented annually by the Academy to a feature-length motion picture produced outside the United States that contains primarily non-English dialogue. The Foreign Language Film Award Committee oversees the process and reviews all the submitted films.

For the 73rd Academy Awards, the submitted motion pictures must have first been released theatrically in their respective countries between 1 November 1999 and 31 October 2000. The deadline for submissions to the Academy was 1 November 2000. 46 countries submitted films and were found to be eligible by AMPAS and screened for voters. Ecuador submitted a film for the first time. The five nominees were announced on 13 February 2001.

Taiwan won the award for the first time with Crouching Tiger, Hidden Dragon by Ang Lee, which also won Best Art Direction, Best Original Score, and Best Cinematography, and was also nominated for Best Picture, Best Director, Best Adapted Screenplay, Best Costume Design, Best Film Editing and Best Original Song.

== Submissions ==
Submitting country	Film title used in nomination	Original title	Language(s)	Director(s)	Result
Algeria	Little Senegal		Wolof, English, French, Arabic	Rachid Bouchareb	Not nominated
Argentina	Merry Christmas	Felicidades	Spanish, Hebrew	Lucho Bender	Not nominated
Austria	The Stranger	Die Fremde	German, English, Spanish	Götz Spielmann	Not nominated
Belgium	Everybody's Famous!	Iedereen beroemd!	Flemish, English, Spanish	Dominique Deruddere	Nominated
Brazil	Me You Them	Eu Tu Eles	Brazilian Portuguese	Andrucha Waddington	Not nominated
Bulgaria	Letter to America	Писмо до Америка	Bulgarian, English	Iglika Trifonova	Not nominated
Canada	Maelström		French, Norwegian, English	Denis Villeneuve	Not nominated
Chile	Coronation	Coronación	Spanish	Silvio Caiozzi	Not nominated
China	Breaking the Silence	漂亮媽媽	Mandarin	Sun Zhou	Not nominated
Croatia	Marshal Tito's Spirit	Maršal	Croatian, Southern Chakavian	Vinko Brešan	Not nominated
Czech Republic	Divided We Fall	Musíme si pomáhat	Czech, German	Jan Hřebejk	Nominated
Denmark	A Place Nearby	Her i nærheden	Danish	Kaspar Rostrup	Not nominated
Ecuador	Dreams from the Middle of the World	Sueños en la mitad del mundo	Spanish	Carlos Naranjo Estrella	Not nominated
Finland	Seven Songs from the Tundra	Сёни’ си”ив тарка / Seitsemän laulua tundralta	Nenets, Russian, Finnish	Anastasia Lapsui and Markku Lehmuskallio	Not nominated
France	The Taste of Others	Le goût des autres	French	Agnès Jaoui	Nominated
Georgia	27 Missing Kisses	27 დაკარგული კოცნა	Georgian, Russian, French, English	Nana Djordjadze	Not nominated
Germany	No Place to Go	Die Unberührbare	German	Oskar Roehler	Not nominated
Greece	Peppermint	Πέπερμιντ	Greek	Costas Kapakas	Not nominated
Hong Kong	In the Mood for Love	花樣年華	Cantonese, Shanghainese	Wong Kar-wai	Not nominated
Hungary	Glamour		Hungarian, German, Hebrew	Frigyes Gödrös	Not nominated
Iceland	Angels of the Universe	Englar alheimsins	Icelandic	Friðrik Þór Friðriksson	Not nominated
India	Hey Ram	ஹே ராம் / हे राम	Tamil, Marathi, Bengali, English, Hindi, Malayalam, Thanjavur Marathi, Gujarati	Kamal Haasan	Not nominated
Iran	A Time for Drunken Horses	کاتێک بۆ مەستیی ئەسپەکان / زمانی برای مستی اسب‌ها	Central Kurdish, Persian	Bahman Ghobadi	Not nominated
Israel	Time of Favor	ההסדר	Hebrew	Joseph Cedar	Not nominated
Italy	The Hundred Steps	I cento passi	Italian, Sicilian	Marco Tullio Giordana	Not nominated
Japan	After the Rain	雨あがる	Japanese	Takashi Koizumi	Not nominated
Mexico	Amores perros		Spanish	Alejandro González Iñárritu	Nominated
Morocco	Ali Zaoua	علي زاوا	Arabic, French	Nabil Ayouch	Not nominated
Nepal	Mask of Desire	मुकुण्डो	Nepali	Tsering Rhitar Sherpa	Not nominated
Netherlands	Little Crumb	Kruimeltje	Dutch	Maria Peters	Not nominated
Norway	Odd Little Man	Da jeg traff Jesus... med sprettert	Norwegian	Stein Leikanger	Not nominated
Philippines	Anak		Filipino, English	Rory Quintos	Not nominated
Poland	Life as a Fatal Sexually Transmitted Disease	Życie jako śmiertelna choroba przenoszona drogą płciową	Polish, French, English	Krzysztof Zanussi	Not nominated
Portugal	Too Late	Tarde Demais	Portuguese	José Nascimento	Not nominated
Russia	His Wife's Diary	Дневник его жены	Russian	Alexei Uchitel	Not nominated
Slovakia	Landscape	Krajinka	Slovak	Martin Šulík	Not nominated
South Korea	Chunhyang	춘향뎐	Korean	Im Kwon-taek	Not nominated
Spain	You're the One	Una historia de entonces	Spanish	José Luis Garci	Not nominated
Sweden	Songs from the Second Floor	Sånger från andra våningen	Swedish	Roy Andersson	Not nominated
Switzerland	Gripsholm		German, Swedish	Xavier Koller	Not nominated
Taiwan	Crouching Tiger, Hidden Dragon	臥虎藏龍	Mandarin	Ang Lee	Won Academy Award
Thailand	6ixtynin9	เรื่องตลก	Thai	Pen-ek Ratanaruang	Not nominated
Turkey	Run for Money	Kaç Para Kaç	Turkish	Reha Erdem	Not nominated
Venezuela	Devil Gold	Oro diablo	Spanish	José Ramón Novoa	Not nominated
Vietnam	The Vertical Ray of the Sun	Mùa hè chiều thẳng đứng	Vietnamese	Trần Anh Hùng	Not nominated
FR Yugoslavia	Sky Hook	Небеска удица	Serbian	Ljubiša Samardžić	Not nominated
