= Seven Songs from the Tundra =

- Film poster
- Directed by: Anastasia Lapsui; Markku Lehmuskallio
- Written by: Anastasia Lapsui
- Produced by: Tuula Söderberg
- Cinematography: Johannes Lehmuskallio
- Production company: Jörn Donner Productions
- Distributed by: Senso Films (theatrical); Pierre Grise Distribution (all media)
- Release date: 18 February 2000 (Finland)
- Running time: 90 minutes
- Country: Russia
- Languages: Nenets; Russian
- Box office: $16,099 (worldwide)

Seven Songs from the Tundra (Finnish: Seitsemän laulua tundralta) is a 1999 Finnish film directed by Anastasia Lapsui and Markku Lehmuskallio that is the first narrative film in the Nenets language. It tells stories of the indigenous nomadic people of the Russian tundra under modern Communist rule, combining Nenets legends with personal experiences.

The film won the Grand Prix of the Créteil International Women's Film Festival in 2000. It was Finland's submission to the 73rd Academy Awards for the Academy Award for Best Foreign Language Film, but was not accepted as a nominee. In 2001, the film won the Jussi Award for Best Film.

== Plot ==
The film is divided into seven short stories.

Sacrifice

A group of Nenets people gather by a tree in the middle of the tundra, decorated in reindeer antlers and a small bell, to butcher a reindeer. A woman anoints the tree with its blood, and places the reindeer head at the base of the tree. They all sit together, drinking reindeer blood from ceramic cups, and eating reindeer meat.

The Bride

A Nenets girl enjoys flirting with the young men who work in her village. When she is told she has been engaged to a man from another village, she begrudgingly goes with him. On the way to his home, she dismounts the sleigh and runs back home. Her mother condemns the girl for going against her wishes, and tells her she can be the servants for the men she loves so much. In a montage, she mends their clothing, cleans a hide, washes their dishes, and works so hard she begins to cry. The young men begin to treat her poorly as their servant; she berates them one morning as she prepares their boots for them, saying, "You swore eternal love to me when my brothers were alive." One of them responds, "I must've been drunk if something like that slipped out of my mouth." Later that morning, she goes with them to the village. There, they introduce her to a Russian man, whom they have just sold her to. Years later, she walks in front of the house of the man she would have married. She laments her loss of beauty and innocence.

An Independent Person

A Nenets man is chopping wood when he sees four Soviet soldiers and a Nenets translator approaching. The translator announces that kolkhoz (collective farming) has arrived in the tundra, and the soldiers are there to collect the man's reindeer. The man says, "If this Kolkoze is poor, then of course we help him. It's the way things are here on the tundra." The translator, however, has other plans. He paints the man as being shrewd and evasive, even insulting, and pits the man and the soldiers against each other until in the end, a soldier draws a gun on the man.

God

Two Nenets men, one a war veteran, stop to have a drink and small meal in front of a statue of Lenin in town. The veteran man recounts his war days, explaining that before the Battle of Vesyoli Village, he poured some vodka on the ground and prayed to Lenin that the bullets wouldn't hit him. Instead, he says, crying, all the locals he knew there died, and he himself was wounded. Gesturing to Lenin's statue bitterly, he says, "I protected Lenin's city, Leningrad." He moves to pour the remainder of his vodka at the base of the statue, but is stopped by a white man in a suit. The men offer him a place to sit with them in front of the statue, but the man declines. Instead, he calls a colleague from his office to remove the men from in front of the statue. "I just walked past Lenin's statue. There were two old Nenets eating there, and drinking vodka. You understand, it's not done." The Nenets men explain to the approaching Russian soldiers that they were simply praying for good weather and good catch before going off fishing. The soldiers deride the men for thinking Lenin is a god.

Enemies of the People

A group of Russian women - some old, some young, some related, some not - sit together in a log cabin. They dance and sing for awhile to keep themselves occupied. A young girl, Olesya, looks wistfully out the window at people in the yard. Nearby, a Nenets boy watches the Russians, but his mother comes out of the family chum (tent) and chides him, telling him not to look at those exiled from their homeland. Back in the log cabin, a woman with a baby in her arms asks her Aunt Olya to read the cards for her, to interpret her dream. Her aunt starts a reading, but is interrupted by the arrival of the Commissar. He is presented with receipts and statements of the group's work, but is less than impressed with what he is presented; a report on fish is missing. He expects perfection in their recordkeeping, lest the "enemies of the workers" take advantage of any weak point. The group is clearly exhausted, and report they have also been unable to fulfill their studying requirements while working to fulfil their duties. The leader of the group, Ivan, invites the Commissar to stay with them awhile, but the Commissar rebuffs the invitation, saying, "You're not people. You're enemies of the Soviet power. I'd rather swallow smoke or feed mosquitoes in a tepee." Olesya suddenly runs outside to the lake, and stares longingly at a Nenets couple in a rowboat, laughing and splashing each other. Ivan sits outside the log cabin, holding the baby, telling them he wishes they never have to live the life he has lived. The Russian group gathers on the waterfront, and warm their feet in an old firepit while telling stories of their lives before the Soviet era. The next morning, two of the women, Mashka and Olesya, deliver the missing report on the fish to the Commissar, who is staying with the nearby Nenets family. He tells the Russian women to stay outside while he finishes breakfast. After sitting outside for awhile, Olesya comes into the chum and watches everyone eat. A Nenets man tells her in halting Russian, "Don't worry, tomorrow will be better."

Syako

Syako, a young Nenets girl, cries while praying to the gods to make their home invisible so the Russian schoolteachers don't find it. Later, while eating a meal with her family, Syako asks if they can move. Her father says that they would need a permit from the leader of the collective to move, as there is much work to be done still. Later, while gathering water, Syako spots the teachers, and ducks down into the grass to hide. The teachers return later, and spot Syako lurking; a wild chase is had across the grasslands. A scene shows the end of recess at a local boarding school, with Nenets children dressed in western clothing, laughing and playing. The children end their school day and come back to the village, playing with wooden guns and making machine gun noises. Later, after a snowstorm, Syako (who remains unenrolled) goes to see her friend Maima; she is proudly wearing a Russian shawl and several scarves symbolizing being a pioneer and a Communist. She asks Syako to refer to her from now on by her new Russian name, Lida. Flustered, Syako runs off. Early the next morning, Syako and her father are preparing to go fishing, but are interrupted by the arrival of a white man and a Nenets man. The Nenets man announces that the summer and autumn work has been completed, and that new goals have been established. Syako's father balks at the new hunting targets, but the Nenets man isn't going to debate it. Instead, he asks where their pictures of Stalin and Lenin are. Syako's mother says she keeps them away so they don't gather dust, but the Nenets man reprimands her, saying they must be visible at all times, or they will be reported. He then scolds Syako for making the schoolteachers go hunting for her. Syako's father tries to tell the two men that his daughter still isn't talking very well, and that other children tease her - that developmentally, she is not ready still for school. But the white man simply says, "She's nine years old, she must go to school. [...] You'll destroy her future." Syako's mother says, "I'm not giving up my daughter! She will not be turned into a Russian!" But they dress Syako, and take her away - screaming - to school. Her mother chases them in vain.

Lullaby

A Nenets woman sings to calm a crying newborn.

== See also ==
- List of submissions to the 73rd Academy Awards for Best Foreign Language Film
