= The Stranger (2000 film) =

2000 film

- Directed by: Götz Spielmann
- Written by: Maria Scheibelhofer; Götz Spielmann
- Produced by: Wulf Flemming
- Starring: Goya Toledo; Hary Prinz; Martin Feifel
- Cinematography: Fabian Eder
- Edited by: Hubert Canaval
- Music by: Walter W. Cikan; Eddi Siblik
- Production company: TeamFilm Produktion
- Distributed by: Wien-Film
- Release date: September 8, 2000 (Canada)
- Running time: 102 minutes
- Country: Austria
- Languages: German; English; Spanish

The Stranger (German: Die Fremde) is a 2000 Austrian film directed by Götz Spielmann. It was Austria's submission to the 73rd Academy Awards for the Academy Award for Best Foreign Language Film, but was not accepted as a nominee.

== Cast ==
- Goya Toledo as Mercedes
- Hary Prinz as Harry
- Martin Feifel as Rainer
- Nina Proll as Simon Schwarz
- Wolfgang Böck as Erich
- Georg Friedrich as Türsteher
- Fritz Karl as Franz
- Wolfgang Michalek as Geschäftsführer

== See also ==
- Cinema of Austria
- List of submissions to the 73rd Academy Awards for Best Foreign Language Film
