= Pertti Ylermi Lindgren =

Finnish confidence trickster, actor and entertainer (1936–2015)

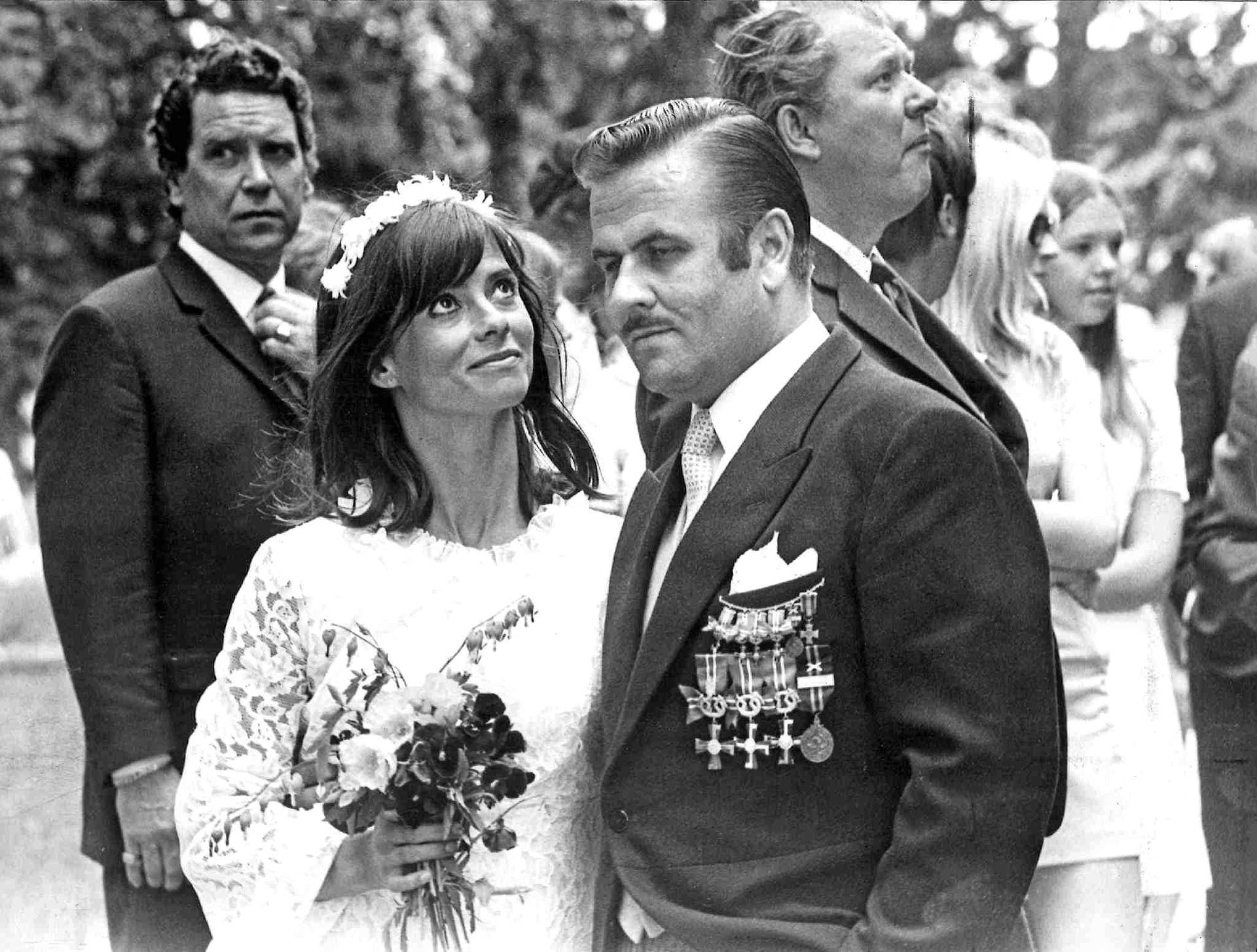
Kirsti Wallasvaara and the celebrity Pertti Ylermi Lindgren on the set of the film Kreivi.

Pertti Ylermi Lindgren (born 13 April 1936 in Turku, Finland, died 19 February 2015 in Stockholm, Sweden) was a Finnish confidence trickster, actor and entertainer.

Lindgren claimed to have been engaged to be married 76 times, and spent three and a half years in jail for associated embezzlement. He posed as a member of the Swedish aristocracy, using the names Tage Efraim Melin, Bernhard af Creutz, Toni Peter William Axel Alexander Oscar Oxenstierna and Gunnar af Heidenstam, as well as a priest, an archaeologist and an Italian bank manager. His exploits were made famous by the tabloid press in Scandinavia. He officially changed his name to Peter after moving to Sweden in 1976. Having successfully passed as both Greve (Count) Oxenstierna and Greve Heidenstam, his nickname was Kreivi (Finnish for Count), which he later used as his professional name as a singer and entertainer. Lindgren had learned the Swedish language when he and his little brother Jorma were sent as war children to Sweden after their father had fallen in World War II. He claimed he was able to adopt a convincingly aristocratic manner from living with the Swedish Tegelund family as a wartime evacuee. He portrayed himself in an autobiographical film, Kreivi, 1971, directed by Peter von Bagh. He died in Stockholm in 2015 and is buried in Norra begravningsplatsen, Stockholm.
