= Peter von Bagh =

Finnish film historian (1943–2014)

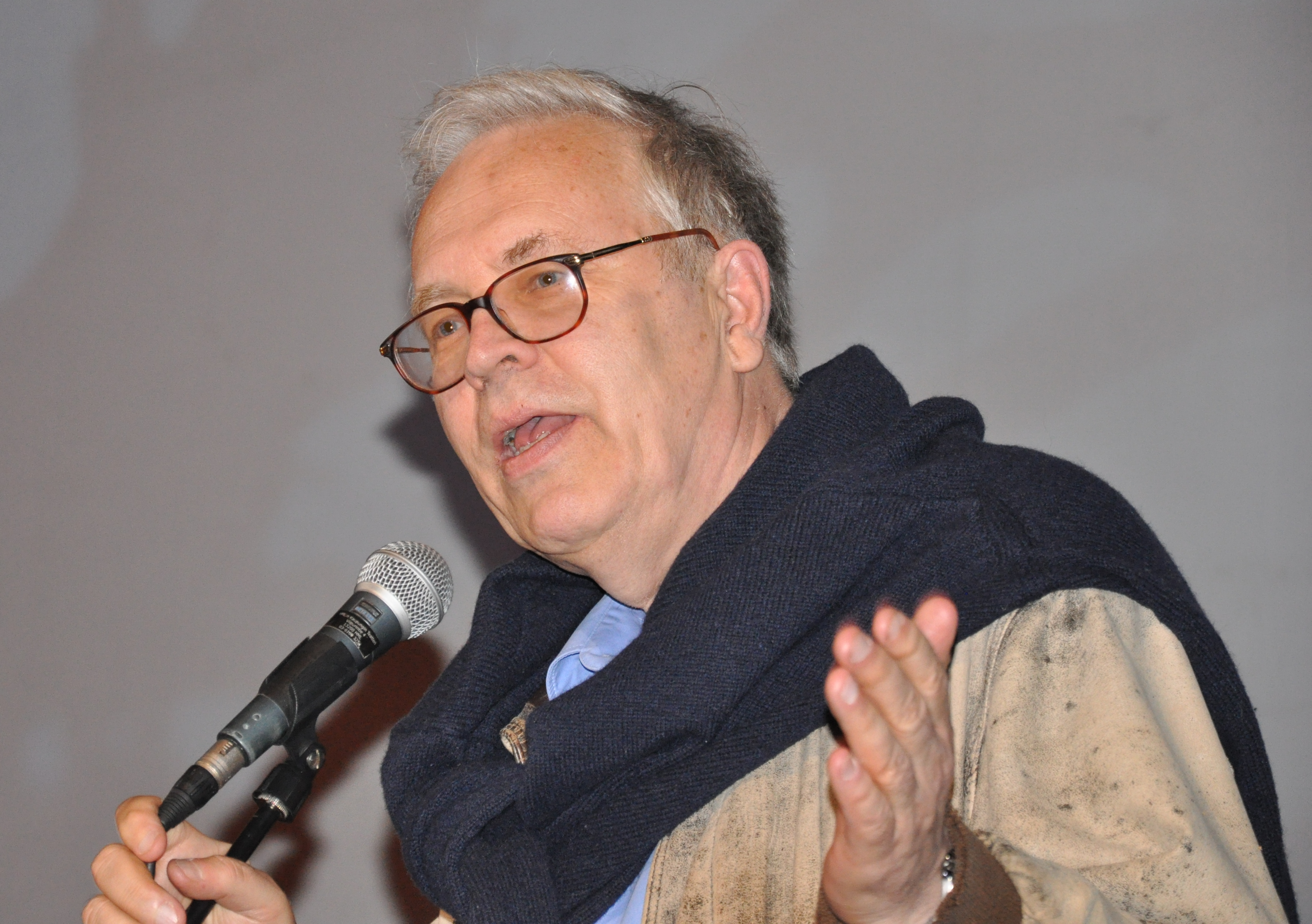
- Born: 29 August 1943; Helsinki, Finland
- Died: 17 September 2014 (aged 71)
- Occupations: Film Historian, Director

Kari Peter Conrad von Bagh (29 August, 1943 – 17 September, 2014) was a Finnish film historian and director. Von Bagh worked as the head of the Finnish Film Archive, editor-in-chief of Filmihullu magazine and co-founder and director of the Midnight Sun Film Festival. From 2001, he was the artistic director of the film festival Il Cinema Ritrovato in Bologna. Von Bagh was a member of the jury in the competition category of 2004 Cannes Film Festival.

Films directed by Bagh have been screened at prestigious international forums, including retrospectives of his filmography at the 2012 Rotterdam International Film Festival, the 2012 Festival Internacional de Cine Independente in Buenos Aires, and the Tromsø International Film Festival in 2013.

Bagh's wrote approximately 40 non-fiction books, mostly on cinema, and some 60 films for both the cinemas and television include his internationally successful films Helsinki, Forever (2008) and Sodankylä, Forever (2010–2011), a documentary series of the first twenty-five years of the Midnight Sun Film Festival. He died in 2014 at the age of 71.

== Studies ==
Born to a German Russian psychiatrist father, Bagh graduated from the Oulun lyseo Upper Secondary School in 1961. He took his Master of Arts degree at University of Helsinki in 1970 with a combination of subjects consisting of Theoretical Philosophy, Sociology, Aesthetics, and Literature. His dissertation Elokuvalliset keinot ja niiden käyttö: Alfred Hitchcockin Vertigo was later published as a book (Helsingin yliopisto, 1979). Bagh took his degree of Doctor of Social Sciences in 2002. His doctoral thesis Peili jolla oli muisti – elokuvallinen kollaasi kadonneen ajan merkityksien hahmottajana (1895–1970), (SKS 2002) examines the fundamental units of cinematic expression, montage and collage.

Bagh has taught and lectured at several schools and universities, e.g. as Professor of Film History at Aalto University since 2001. He has also compiled a textbook on cinema, Salainen muisti (Sanoma Pro, 2009), to be used in schools.

Bagh's focus is the history of everyday Finnish life: images of details conveying something of what the life of the Finns has been like. The films Vuosi 1952 ("The Year 1952", 1980), Viimeinen kesä 1944 ("The Last Summer 1944", 1992), Helsinki, Forever (2008) and Splinters – A Century of an Artistic Family (2011) provide a magnifying glass for peeking at history, defined by a certain moment in time, location, or an artistic family.

Von Bagh made dozens of films for television, including portraits of prominent Finns from different fields (Tapio Rautavaara in Tapsa – Slashes from a Rover's Life, 1980; Paavo Nurmi, 1978; Otto Ville Kuusinen in Mies varjossa, 1994), musicians (Olavi Virta, 1972; Suomi Pop, 1984), actors (Tauno Palo, 1981) and film directors (Edvin Laine, 2006; Mikko Niskanen, 2010).

Von Bagh's fiction films are often documentary in their own way: the main character of The Count (1971) is Pertti Ylermi Lindgren, a con man elevated to nobility by the tabloid papers. Pockpicket (1968) is a variation on Robert Bresson's Pickpocket (1959). In it, an estranged young man attempts to instil tension into his life by slipping banknotes into the wallets of the city-dwellers.

As a scriptwriter, Von Bagh has participated in the making of Risto Jarva's Time of Roses (1969), Rally (1970) and When the Heavens Fall.. (1972).

== Literary production ==
Von Bagh's literary production includes almost 40 books of non-fiction. In 2007, von Bagh received the Ministry of Education and Culture, Finland's State Award for Public Information for a Lifetime Achievement. The same year his book Song of Finland was awarded The Finlandia Literary Prize for Non-Fiction. He has received the State Award for Public Information twice, in 1986 for Iskelmän kultainen kirja ("Golden Book of Finnish Pop Songs" co-author Ilpo Hakasalo) and in 1975 for Elokuvan historia ("History of Cinema". In 1992 The Finnish Literature Society SKS presented him with the SKS Elias Lönnroth Award for Suomalaisen elokuvan kultainen kirja (Golden Book of Finnish Cinema").

Von Bagh's essays and articles have been published in several film books and magazines both in Finland and abroad. The most famous of these are the French L'Écran, Cahiers du cinéma, Trafic and Cinema 02, the Italian Cinegrafie, the Spanish Nosferatu, the Swedish Chaplin, the British Movie, etc.

Up until his death Peter von Bagh worked as the editor-in-chief of Filmihullu, the magazine he founded in 1968.

Abroad, von Bagh worked as a cinema expert for the French non-fiction publishing house Larousse in 2009, and as a permanent contributing editor of the Italian Einaudi publishing company.

=== Love kirjat ===
Peter von Bagh was also active promoter of literature in his native country, working as an editor and preface writer for the Love kirjat publishing company during 1977–1996. The titles published by Love kirjat, more than one hundred, include translations of world literature classics from Aiskhylos (Oresteia, Love 1991) to Balzac (Lost Illusions, Love 1983, The Splendors and Miseries of Courtesans', Love 1991), from Jack London (The Iron Heel, Love 1977) to August Strindberg (Pieni katekismus, Love 1981), to poetry (e.g. Matti Rossi), essayism (e.g. Raoul Palmgren) and detective stories (James Cain: Double Indemnity, Love 1982), literature research (György Lukács Balzac ja ranskalainen realismi, Love 1978), not forgetting economics, military history, and Sigmund Freud The Joke and Its Relation to the Unconscious, Love 1983).

Love kirjat has also brought several fundamental works of film literature to the Finnish readers, e.g. André Bazin's essays (Love 1981, 1990), Sergei Eisenstein's Film Form: Essays in Film Theory (Love, 1978); Federico Fellini's Fellini on Fellini (Love, 1980) and Giulietta (Love, 1990); Jean Renoir's My Life and My Films (Love, 1980), for which Peter von Bagh has written a preface. Other important Love translations are Elokuva Godardin mukaan, a collection of film criticism by Jean-Luc Godard, translated into Finnish by Sakari Toiviainen (Love, 1984), and François Truffaut's The Films in My Life (Love, 1982).

Besides film literature, Love also published elemental work of other art forms, e.g. Meyerhold's A Revolution in Theatre (Love, 1981) and Hanns Eisler's essays on music (Love, 1980).

== Festival directorships ==
The Midnight Sun Film Festival was founded in 1986 on the initiative of Anssi Mänttäri. In addition to Mänttäri, the Festival policy and guidelines were created by Kaurismäki brothers, Mika and Aki Kaurismäki and Peter von Bagh.

The two-hour morning discussions, hosted by Peter von Bagh throughout the Festival's history, are internationally unique items. From discussions with hundreds of guests, Peter von Bagh has selected the best elements for his book Sodankylä, Forever (WSOY, 2010) and a four-part documentary series of the same name. The series has garnered extensive praise at the world's film forums, e.g. at Lincoln Center in New York in August 2011 when Nico Baumbach wrote in Film Comment (Sept/Oct 2011):

From 2001 Peter von Bagh worked as the Artistic Director of Il Cinema Ritrovato Festival in Bologna. The Festival specializes in "recovered" treasures, previously believed lost or unknown, silent films and restored prints. The screen annually erected in Piazza Maggiore in Bologna at the turn of June/July attracts an audience of thousands of spectators. The Festival audience includes both local cinephiles and international specialists of the field.

Von Bagh also acted as an Artistic Expert for San Sebastián International Film Festival in 2009, the Visiting Artistic Director of the Telluride Film Festival in 1997, and as a member of the Cannes Film Festival Competition section in 2004.

== Film archives ==
Peter von Bagh worked as the executive director of the Finnish Film Archive in 1966–1969, and as the Programme Planner until 1984. During that period, the Archive's programming gained its present esteemed reputation, and the number of screenings proliferated.

In the speech von Bagh gave at the FIAF (International Federation of Film Archives) conference in Lisbon in 1989 he emphasized: "When I started the Archive offered only two screenings per week. I immediately increased the number of screenings to four. Soon we managed to screen eight films each week. A few years passed this way, and when the confidence of the audience had solidified, we began to screen three films a day." It was a golden era for the cinemas in Helsinki. An example: "In the 1970s Bresson's films brought in more money in Helsinki than in Paris."

Peter von Bagh continues: "Many archives have fallen for easy baits and an emphasis on fashionable films. That is the best way to lose an audience whose confidence can only be won through a patient building process. Officials equipped with short-sighted calculations may find it difficult to understand why a small archive would order a rare film from a distant country for one screening only. Calculations like this easily paralyzes socio-cultural activities altogether. The discrepancy hangs in the air, written in fiery letters: the audience seems to be drooling after de Palma and Eastwood, although an inner voice calls you to screen bodies of works scrutinizing the output of Victor Sjöström and Carl Th. Dreyer... The first screening of Victor Sjöström or Carl Th. Dreyer might bring in fifteen people, but after five years and some more efforts there will be a full house. The preservation prints of an early Yevgeni Bauer film, or Maurice Tourneur's The Wishing Ring (which would be almost nothing in 16 mm or in video) will look just miraculous to any public that comes in and there will be one once you build a place where everyone can trust that miracles take place, almost on daily basis. In the beginning, a film maybe a complete unknown but the visiting card it leaves behind remains forever: a wonderful beauty."

In the same speech, von Bagh defines the responsibilities of the archives: preservation of a confidential relationship with the audience, protection and restoration of the classics, and especially domestic films, and support to film clubs as a common film bank which makes the screenings possible.

== Films ==
=== Early short films ===
- Pockpicket – Recollections of a Helsinki Bourgeois Youth (with Pentti Maisala, 1968)
- Vanhan valtaus (Bagh–Toiviainen–Maisala–Katainen, 1968)
- December (1969)

=== Feature films ===
- The Count ("Kreivi") (1971)

=== Feature-length documentaries for theatrical distribution ===
- Viimeinen kesä 1944 (1992)
- Vuosi 1939 (1993)

=== TV productions ===
- Olavi Virta (1972)
- Paavo Nurmi – The Man and His Times (with Markku Koski, 1978)
- Sinitaivas – matka muistojen maisemaan (1978)
- Fragments of the life of Reino Helismaa (1979)
- Tankavaaran Travolta (1979)
- Vuosi 1952 (1980)
- Tapsa – Slashes from a Rover's Life (1980)
- Laulajan lähtö (1980)
- Tauno Palo (1981)
- Väliasemalla Veikko Lavi (1982)
- A Day at the Grave of Karl Marx (1983)
- Suomi Pop 1–5 – suomalaisen iskelmän historia (1984–1985)
- Lähikuvassa 1–19: Tuomari Nurmio, Remu Aaltonen, Pelle Miljoona, Juice Leskinen, Hassisen Kone, Eppu Normaali, Dave "Isokynä" Lindholm, Rauli "Badding" Somerjoki, Kipparikvartetti, Erkki Junkkarinen, Jorma Ikävalko, Matti Jurva, Harmony Sisters, Esa Pakarinen, Palle, Henry Theel, Vili Vesterinen, Eugen Malmstén ja Big Band, Metro-Tytöt (1983–1992)
- Yhdeksän hetkeä Urho Kekkosen elämästä (1985)
- Elämä ja aurinko – rapsodia F.E. Sillanpään maisemasta (1985)
- Isoveli (1985)
- Ajan draama (1986)
- Muisto (1987)
- Faaraoiden maa (1987)
- Asema (1987)
- Tämä on Suomi (1987)
- Olavi Virta (1987)
- Jukeboxin ikivihreät (1988)
- Henkilökohtainen ongelma (1988)
- SF:n tarina 1–6 (1990–1991)
- T.J. Särkkä 100 vuotta (1990)
- Kohtaaminen (1992)
- Suomi-Filmin tarina 1–5 (1993)
- Fennadan tarina 1–3 (1993)
- Mies varjossa 1–3 (& Elina Katainen & Iikka Vehkalahti, 1994)
- Erään oopperan synty: Lapualaisooppera (1996)
- Oi kallis Suomenmaa 1–8 (1997) (16-osainen versio: 1999)
- <<Víctor Erice & El sol del membrillo<< Victor Eríce: unelma valosta (1997)
- Irma Seikkula – kulta-ajan tähti (1998)
- Sininen laulu – Suomen taiteiden tarina 1–12 (2003–2004)
- Kansalainen Puupää (Armand Lohikosken muotokuva) (2004)
- Edvin Laine (2006)
- Helsinki, Forever (2008)
- Tähtien tarina 1–6: Hannes Häyrinen, Ville Salminen, Hannu Leminen, Eeva-Kaarina Volanen, Leif Wager, Tarmo Manni (2008)
- Ohjaaja matkalla ihmiseksi: Mikko Niskasen tarina 1–3 (2010)
- Sodankylä, Forever 1–4: Elokuvan vuosisata, Ensimmäisen elokuvamuiston kaiho, Ikuinen aika, Valon draama (2010–2011)
- Splinters – A Century of an Artistic Family (2011)
- The Finns and Money: A Love Story (2011)

=== Scriptwriter for films by other directors ===
- Time of Roses (Jarva, 1969)
- Summer Rebellion (team Sex, 1970)
- Rally (Gasoline in my Veins) (Jarva, 1970)
- When the Heavens Fall... (Jarva, 1972)
- Synopsis for Aki Kaurismäki's I Hired a Contract Killer (1990)

== Articles in film books ==
- The Lumière Project: The European Film Archives at the Crossroads (Cathrine A. SUROWIEC), Associação Projeto Lumiere, Lissabon 1996, ISBN 972-95404-0-3
- Cinémas d'Europe du Nord. De Fritz Lang á Lars von Trier (Claire VALADE), Arte Editions, Mille et une nuits, Paris 1998, ISBN 2-84205-372-9
- Nordic Explorations. Film Before 1930 (John FULLERTON & Jan OLSSON), John Libbey et co, Stockholm 1999, ISBN 1-86462-055-2
- Stars au feminin, (Gian Luca FARINELLE & Jean-Loup PASSEK), Centre Pompidou, Paris 2000, ISBN 1-86462-055-2
- Raoul Walsh (Michael Henry WILSON), Cinémathèque Française, Paris 2001, ISBN 2-900596-38-6
- Edgar G. Ulmer Le bandit démasqué (Charles TATUM), Éditions Yellow Now, Paris 2002, ISBN 978-2-87340-171-9
- Don Siegel und seine Filme (Frank ARNOLD), Vertigo, München 2003, ISBN 3-934028-05-5
- The Unknown Orson Welles (Stefan DRÖSSLER), Belleville Filmmuseum München, München 2004, ISBN 3-936298-31-9
- Ai poeti non si spara. Vittorio Cottafavi tra cinema e televisione, (Adriano APRA & Giulio BURSI), Cineteca di Bologna, Bologne 2010, ISBN 88-95862-01-5
- Luci del ribalta (avec Anna Fiaccarini et Cecilia Cenciarelli), Cineteca Bologna, 2002, ISBN 88-8012-214-2

== Books in Finnish ==
- Uuteen elokuvaan. Kirjoituksia elokuvasta, Von Bagh, Peter, WSOY, Helsinki 1967
- Elävältä haudatut kuvat, Tammi, Helsinki 1969
- Paljastava silmä. Luokat taistelevat – elokuvat kertovat, Weilin+Göös, Helsinki 1973, ISBN 978-951-35-0895-1
- Elokuvan historia, Weilin+Göös, Helsinki 1975, ISBN 978-951-35-1333-7 (nouvelle édition 1998 et 2004)
- Olavi Virta (with Pekka Aarnio & Markku Koski), WSOY, Helsinki [1977], ISBN 978-951-0-08023-8
- Teatterikirja (with Pekka Milonoff), Love, Helsinki 1977, ISBN 978-951-835-005-0
- Elvis! Amerikkalaisen laulajan elämä ja kuolema, Love, Helsinki 1977, ISBN 978-951-835-006-7
- Hitchcock. Merkintöjä Alfred Hitchcockin elokuvasta Vertigo, Suomen Elokuvasäätiö, Helsinki 1979, ISBN 978-951-9349-10-7
- Joris Ivens – dokumentaristin muotokuva, Suomen Elokuva-arkisto, Helsinki 1981
- Englantilainen elokuva, Suomen Elokuva-arkisto, Helsinki 1980, ISBN 978-951-859-039-5
- Taikayö, Love, Helsinki 1981, ISBN 951-835-049-3
- Jean Cocteau (edited by Claude Beylie), Suomen elokuva-arkisto, Helsinki 1983, ISBN 951-859-324-8
- Kymmenen elokuvaa, Love, Helsinki 1984, ISBN 951-835-082-5
- Iskelmän kultainen kirja (with Ilpo Hakasalo), Otava, Helsinki 1986, ISBN 978-951-1-08913-1
- Elämää suuremmat elokuvat, Otava, Helsinki 1989, ISBN 978-951-1-10983-9
- Elokuvan ilokirja, Otava, Helsinki 1990, ISBN 978-951-1-10581-7
- Kaipuun punainen hetki, Otava, Helsinki 1991, ISBN 978-951-1-11950-0
- Suomalaisen elokuvan kultainen kirja, Suomen Elokuva-arkisto, Helsinki 1992, ISBN 978-951-1-12295-1
- Elämää suuremmat elokuvat II, Otava, Helsinki 1996, ISBN 978-951-1-12811-3
- Paras elokuvakirja (edited by Von Bagh), WSOY, Helsinki 1995, ISBN 978-951-0-20463-4
- Rikoksen hehku, Otava, Helsinki 1997, ISBN 978-951-1-14631-5
- Suomalaisen elokuvan pieni historia, Otava, Helsinki 2000, ISBN 978-951-1-16301-5
- Lööppikirja (with Koski, Markku), Like, Helsinki 2000, ISBN 978-951-578-823-8
- Hevoset ja minä (with Timo Aarniala), Like, Helsinki 2000, ISBN 978-951-578-816-0
- Peili jolla ei ollut muisti, SKS, Helsinki 2002, ISBN 978-951-746-423-9
- Suomalaisen elokuvan uusi kultainen kirja, Otava, Helsinki 2005, ISBN 951-1-12705-5
- Aki Kaurismäki, WSOY, Helsinki 2006, ISBN 978-951-0-31773-0 (Kaurismäki über Kaurismäki, Alexander Verlag Berlin, ISBN 978-3-89581-342-9)
- Tähtien kirja, Otava, Helsinki 2006, ISBN 978-951-1-18776-9
- Sininen laulu. Itsenäisen Suomen taiteiden tarina, WSOY, Helsinki 2007, ISBN 978-951-0-32895-8
- Vuosisadan tarina. Dokumenttielokuvan historia, Teos, Helsinki 2007, ISBN 978-951-851-093-5
- Salainen muisti, WSOY, Helsinki 2009, ISBN 978-951-0-34558-0
- Lajien synty. Elokuvan rakastetuimmat lajit, WSOY, Helsinki 2009, ISBN 978-951-0-35625-8
- Sodankylä ikuisesti, WSOY, Helsinki 2010, ISBN 978-951-0-36290-7
- Junassa, WSOY, Helsinki 2011, ISBN 978-951-0-37921-9
- Cinefilia, WSOY, Helsinki 2013, ISBN 978-951-0-39786-2
- Chaplin, LIKE, Helsinki 2013, ISBN 978-952-01-0957-8

== Radio works ==
Hundreds of radio programmes from 1961, including extensive series:

- Yöradio
- Suuria elokuvaohjaajia (1963)
- Amerikan ääniä (1974)
- Kohtaamisia (1976)
- Keskusteluja elokuvasta (1981)
- Elämää suuremmat elokuvat (1984–1993 10 programmes each year, altogether 100)
- Elämää suuremmat näyttelijät (1997, 36 programmes)
- Elokuvan historia (2006, 52 programmes)

== Awards and recognitions ==
- 2013 Kultainen Venla Award for a Lifetime Achievement in TV work
- 2007 State Award for Public Information for a Lifetime Achievement
- 2007 The Finlandia Literary Prize for Non-Fiction for the book Sininen laulu (The Song of Finland)
- 2005 The DocPoint Documentary Festival Aho & Soldan Lifetime Achievement Award
- 2005 The Koura Award for the best TV programme of the year for

Sininen laulu (The Song of Finland)

- 1992 The Finnish Literature Society SKS Ellias Lönnroth Award for Suomalaisen elokuvan kultainen kirja
- 1992 The Concrete Jussi (Betoni-Jussi) Lifetime Award
- 1991 Venla Award for the TV series SF:n tarina I-VI
- 1986 State Award for Public Information for the book Iskelmän kultainen kirja (with co-author Ilpo Hakasalo)
- 1984 Venla Award for Suomi Pop – suomalaisen iskelmän historia
- 1980 State Film Award for Vuosi 1952
- 1978 Annual Theatre Award of the Theatre Centre (Vuoden teatteriteko) for the book Teatterikirja (co-editor Pekka Milonoff)
- 1975 State Award for Public Information for the book Elokuvan historia (History of Cinema)

== Grants ==
- Arts Promotion Centre Finland Artist Grant for fifteen years 1984–1999
- The Finnish Cultural Foundation (Suomen Kulttuurirahasto) Grant for Eminent Work 2011

== Education degrees ==
- Undergraduate: Oulun Lyseo Upper Secondary School, 1961
- Bachelor of Arts: University of Helsinki, 1970
- Doctor of Social Sciences: University of Helsinki, 2002
