= Finnish war children =

Children evacuated during World War II

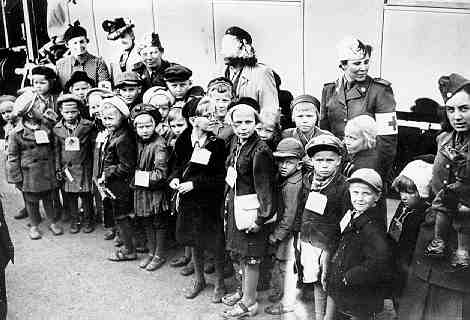
Finnish war children in Turku, Finland, in 1939

During World War II, some 80,000 Finnish children (Finnish: sotalapset, the 'war children' Swedish: krigsbarn) were evacuated from Finland to Scandinavia, chiefly to Sweden, but also to Norway and Denmark. Most were evacuated during the Continuation War (1941–1944) to ease the situation for their parents who set out to rebuild their homes in the re-conquered Karelia returning from the 1940 evacuation of Finnish Karelia. The first surge of evacuees arrived, however, during the Winter War (1939–1940) when the Finns had reasons to fear a humanitarian catastrophe following the expected Soviet occupation.

== By country ==
=== Denmark ===
During the Winter War (1939–1940), 97 children were evacuated to Denmark, and during the Continuation War (1941–1944), over 4,000 children were evacuated. The evacuations were coordinated in Finland by Mannerheim League for Child Welfare's Tanskan-valiokunta (lit. 'Denmark committee') and in Denmark by the organization Finlandshjælpen (lit. 'Finland aid').

At the turn of the year 1944–1945, during the Lapland War between Finland and Nazi Germany, about 1,000 of the children remained in German-occupied Denmark, which posed a threat to their safety. About 500 children stayed in Denmark after World War II.

=== Norway ===
During the Winter War, 107 children were evacuated to Norway. During the Continuation War, evacuations to Norway did not take place due to the country's instability after Nazi Germany occupied it in 1940.

=== Sweden ===
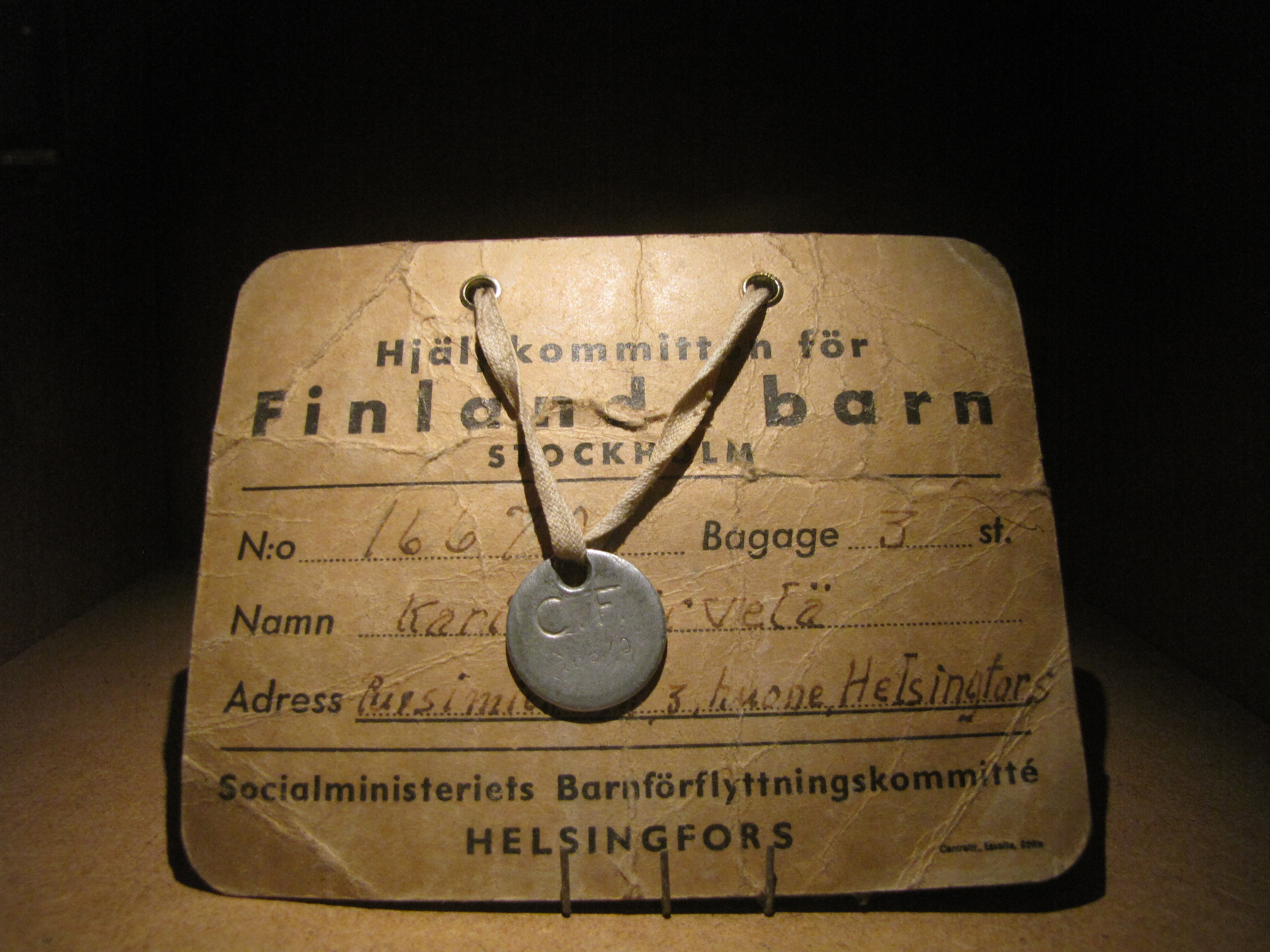
Swedish-language identification document and tag of a Finnish war child

In total, about 72,000 children were evacuated to Sweden during and after World War II, and around 7,100 of them eventually stayed there. (Note: In 1950, the number of Finnish children who remained in Sweden was reported as 15,000, but this figure is now considered inaccurate. Current estimates place the true number at around 7,100.)

During the Winter War, about 9,000 children and 3,000 mothers and elderly people were evacuated to Sweden. Children under three years old were evacuated with their mothers. Of these children, 926 stayed in Sweden after the war.

During and after the Continuation War, about 22,000 children were evacuated in the first phase (1941–1943), coordinated by the Finnish Ministry of Social Affairs' Lastensiirtokomitea (lit. 'Children's transfer committee') and by the Swedish organization Hjälpkommittén för Finlands barn (lit. 'Relief committee for Finland's children'). In the second phase (1944–1946), around 26,000 children were evacuated. In these official evacuations, mothers were not allowed to accompany their children. In addition to the official evacuations, about 15,000 children were evacuated through private arrangements during the war.

== Effects ==
In retrospect, the evacuation has been considered psychologically flawed, as the separations turned out to inflict a far greater damage on the evacuees than the damage suffered by those children who had remained with their parents in Finland. In comparison to Finland's approximately 23,000 military deaths in the Winter War, the 66,000 in the Continuation War, and the total of 2,000 civilian deaths – and the roughly equally many seriously wounded – the war children were, of course, not physically injured, let alone killed. However, their number is of about the same size as that of the war invalids, and many of them feel their sufferings to be ignored.

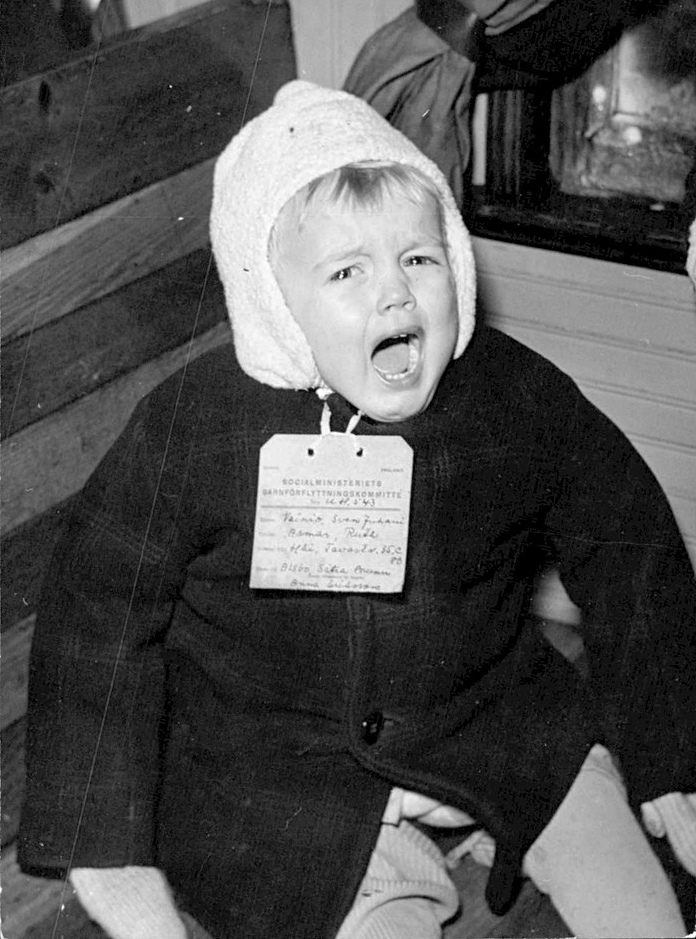
A Finnish war child in Boden, Sweden

== Fate ==
After the war, Finland experienced times of economic hardship, and also substantial insecurity with regard to the Soviet Union's plans for Finland, which resulted in the delay of the return of the children for several years. Ultimately, about 10% of the war children stayed with their foster families after the war, who often adopted them. Many more returned to Sweden as adults, when the prolonged post-war hardship in Finland pushed large contingents of unemployed Finns to Sweden's booming economy in the 1950s–1960s.

== In popular culture ==
Mother of Mine (Finnish: Äideistä parhain, Swedish: Den bästa av mödrar) is a 2005 Finnish-Swedish film directed by Klaus Härö about a Finnish war child who is sent by his mother to live in Sweden during World War II. The film is based on a novel by Heikki Hietamies. It received good reviews from the Finnish press, and was selected as Finland's submission for Best Foreign Language Film at the 78th Academy Awards.

Sörjen som blev (2019, Albert Bonniers Förlag), translated into Finnish as Sina olet suruni (2020), is a book by Anna Takanen about her father's experience as a Finnish war child.She adapted the memoir for the stage and performed it with the National Swedish Touring Theatre in 2021. The book was translated into Finnish as Sina olet suruni (2020).

== Notable people ==
Notable people who, as a child, were evacuated from Finland to Sweden during World War II:

- Jean Cronstedt (born 1932), Swedish gymnast
- Toini Gustafsson (born 1938), Swedish cross-country skier
- Kaija Sanelma Harris (1939–2022), Canadian weaver
- Pentti Kaskipuro (1930–2010), Finnish artist
- Laila Kinnunen (1939–2000), Finnish singer
- Pertti Ylermi Lindgren (1936–2015), Finnish confidence trickster, actor and entertainer
- Frej Lindqvist (born 1937), Swedish actor
- Carita Nyström (1940–2019), Finnish writer, poet, journalist and feminist
- Pentti Saarikoski (1937–1983), Finnish poet

== See also ==
- Evacuation of children in the Spanish Civil War – from the north of the Second Spanish Republic to various European countries.
- Sweden Finns
