= Kaija Sanelma Harris =

Canadian weaver (1939–2022)

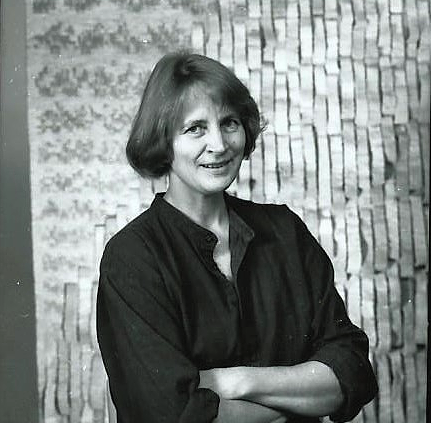
- Born: Kaija Sanelma Lehtimäki; 20 December 1939; Turku, Finland
- Died: 27 August 2022 (aged 82); Saskatoon, Saskatchewan, Canada
- Occupation: Weaver
- Notable work: Sun Ascending (24 panels) (1984, MacKenzie Art Gallery, Regina)

Kaija Sanelma Harris (née Lehtimäki) (December 20, 1939 – August 27, 2022) was a Finnish-born Canadian weaver who was significant to the craft and art community of Canada. She was known for her exceptional use of colour, structure, innovative techniques, and impact on Canadian weaving. She loved the landscape of the place she lived - Saskatoon - and wanted to put in weaving her transient sensory experience of the Prairies, saying "If I could design the landscape…" (into my art, I would be happy). Kaija Sanelma Harris pushed the limits of textile art, wrote the Remai Modern Museum about her art in 2024.

Her works have been featured in solo and group exhibitions across Saskatchewan, Canada, the United States and in Europe.

== Early life and education ==
Kaija Sanelma Harris was born in Turku, Finland. At the age of four, Kaija and her sister were sent to Sweden as Finnish war children to escape the threat of Soviet occupation during the Continuation War. Both her Finnish biological mother and her Swedish foster mother were accomplished textile workers. Her Swedish foster mother knit and embroidered clothes for her, and her Finnish mother was a seamstress who worked out of their home, making gowns to a customer's specifications. Artist Megan Broner who collaborated with Kaija on an exhibition combining each artist's weaving and jewelry, described how Harris' aptitude for textiles began at an early age. Broner recounted a story where Harris' mother asked her to go out and purchase more thread, giving the small child a single blue string for reference, of which Harris was able to perfectly match from memory.

Following high school, Harris studied weaving at Abo Hemslojdslararinne Institut (Turku Textile Teachers Institute) from 1960 to 1964. She described this experience in an artist statement she wrote in 1988. The school was very traditional. Students learned to spin, dye, and weave, and received a thorough understanding of weave structures. Students also learned sewing, drafting patterns, embroidery, and studied many lesser-known textile techniques. Good craftsmanship and design was emphasized. Harris writes that

"Although my first weave was somewhat discouraging, I think I learned more from it than from any later one. I learned the function and meaning of the various parts of the loom, the relationship between a draft and a weave, and above all how to repair broken warp threads and as you all know, the knowledge one gains the hard way is not easily forgotten."

== Career ==
After completing her education, Harris moved to Reykjavík, Iceland, and worked as an assistant to Sigrun Jonsdottir, an Icelandic textile designer specializing in batik and ecclesiastical art.

While in Iceland, she met American Fulbright student Richard Harris and married. Harris' first introduction to North America was in the state of Iowa, in Cedar Rapids. There she attended an exhibition of weaving organized by the Museum of Modern Art: this exhibition was an experience she referred to often as an influence on her art practice. She marveled at the freedom and the 'lack of inhibition' demonstrated by these new contemporary weavers, which included artists from North America, Poland, and Germany. That same year, The Harris' journeyed to Umeå, Sweden, for a time so that her husband could teach at Umeå University. Harris purchased her first loom, and began to teach weaving. In Umeå, she was further influenced by three exhibitions of textile art: a contemporary Polish weaving exhibition; an African weaving exhibition; and an exhibition of the work of Hannah Ryggen. After a few years of moving between the United States and Sweden following Richard Harris' teaching work, the Harris' settled in Saskatchewan in 1973.

Working off her traditional education, and inspired by the experimental textile work seen in the United States and Sweden, Harris began to weave more ambitious tapestries, and secured her first solo exhibition at the Shoestring Gallery in Saskatoon in 1975. She received her first of five Dimensions Premier's Prizes in 1978.

Harris attended the Fibre Interchange workshops at the Banff Centre for Arts and Creativity in Alberta in 1980, under the tutelage of renowned textile artist Mariette Rousseau-Vermette. She stated that this impactful workshop helped her further relax the regimented methods of her traditional education while also making her designs more disciplined and ambitious. The consecutive years of 1981 and 1982 saw Harris as a summer faculty member teaching Architectural Weaving at the Banff Centre.

In 1983 Harris was commissioned by Cadillac Fairview alongside several other prominent Canadian artists to create art for the Toronto-Dominion Centre in Toronto. This commission produced Sun Ascending (1984), the largest of the commissioned pieces displayed at the TD Centre. Sun Ascending is constructed of 24 panels that took Harris and an assistant nine months of full-time work to complete. Myrna Gent describes in a Craft Factor article that Harris worked twelve hours a day, seven days a week for that period of time, while her assistant worked eight-hour days, five days a week. Sun Ascending can be seen in the background of the famous movie American Psycho (2000) at the time stamp of 1h, 21m, while it was installed at the TD Centre. This work was later donated to the MacKenzie Art Gallery collection in Regina, Saskatchewan. This notable donation may have prompted the highly regarded exhibition Prairie Interlace in 2023. Alongside large tapestry work Harris also fulfilled commission work for interior designer and crafts advocate interior designer and crafts advocate Sandy Grotta, creating custom throws, afghans, and blankets, two of which are in the Grotta House collection. In 2001, Harris was a top five finalist for the Saidye Bronfman Award.

Harris' legacy as an innovative and hardworking artist is significant in the Canadian weaving community. She is remembered for developing new structures and methods in weaving, her sensitive approach to color, and her unwavering commitment to her practice. Kaija Harris died on August 27, 2022, at the age of 82.

She exhibited in many group shows and had several solo shows between 1975 and 2008, including Northern Comfort (1988), Tapestries 1990-1993 (1993), Colour Maps (2008), and posthumously, Warp & Weft (2024), a joint retrospective exhibition presented by the Saskatchewan Craft Council and the Remai Modern.

=== Use of colour ===
Harris was known for her sense of colour. She found inspiration from the landscape around her, on both a large and small scale. In an interview with Sheila Roberson for The Craft Factor, she reflected on when she first moved to Saskatchewan: "I fell in love with the province early, driving from the south to the north. I loved the light on the prairie". In the same interview, Harris expands on how the landscape inspired and influenced her work and talks about finding the elusive quality and subtle colours of nature that captivated and motivated her to express them through weaving.

The use of colour and texture in Harris' tapestries were important to her. She chose different threads to blend together, working with shades and values to create the exact colour blends that she needed for her works.

In an interview with the Banff Centre radio program "Studio: Work in Progress", Harris stated that she is very interested in colour but in theory has not received any formal training. She described that her colour use and choice is intuitive, and that she had no inhibitions toward colour. She can put any colour anywhere, and it tends to work. This lack of inhibition is demonstrated in the way she blends and combines yarns, creating a depth of colour.

This technique of blending threads combined with Harris' technical skills created complex uses of colour. When viewed up close these complicated blends reveal lines of individual fibers that combine into a smooth transition when viewed at a distance. This playful use of colour creates remarkable dimensionality in her works. She also considered how different yarns and threads absorb and reflect light, further adding to their visual depth.

An interview "From Inner Eye to Public View: Designing with Kaija Sanelma Harris," by Dorothy Boran, discusses this use of blending threads and the different kinds of yarns Harris used. Boran also discusses how the technical knowledge of Harris' material lets her explore and innovate different methods to blend colours to create the effects she desired.

=== Use of structure ===
Kaija Sanelma Harris developed contemporary structures and methods not previously used in weaving. Combined with her approach to colour, this has made her an innovative weaver in Canadian art. In an interview with curator George Moppett for the Mendel Art Gallery's Tapestries 1990-1993 exhibition catalogue, she described how she developed her own inlaid tapestry weave based on a technique of the British weaver, Theo Moorman. Harris' first experiments resulted in a series of tapestries called Transition, which uses her own version of the Moorman weave to achieve a pictorial image. She later refined this method which she called 'double weave' and 'inlaid tapestry weave.' These methods have two warps, which allowed her to separate and reconnect the yarn systems resulting in three-dimensional works. These three-dimensional structures are in the body of the tapestry and integrated with the pattern itself, rather than assembled separately and attached afterwards.

In an artist statement from 1986 Harris explained that she likeD to stretch the possibilities of her work by finding ways to combine straight lines with ripples, folds, or pleats. These raised areas in the tapestry catch light and cast shadows, helping create the atmosphere or mood she wants for the piece. Examples of her double and inlaid techniques resulting in three-dimensional works can be seen in her pieces such as Stubble Field (1984), On the Way to Shangri-La (1990) and A Place for Contemplation (1998).

Her exploration of double weaving led her to consider how tapestries can be deconstructed, filled, and altered after the weave is off the loom as well. Her "Wild Goose Chase" series played with how shrinkage from washing the textile can produce new textures and forms. In these works light gauzy weavings have been made to hang and be seen from both sides. In an article by Sheila Robertson for the Star-Phoenix, Robertson describes Sanelma's works as striving to be sculptural. Robertson writes that the artist was interested in the idea of excavating her own fabrics. She cut into the layers of finished tapestries to reveal the underlying structures, or experimented with the shrinkage of different wool varieties. She further experimented with unconventional materials, weaving pockets with photo filters that allowed light to pass through, creating slippery glimmers under the delicate surface. These photo filter strategies can be seen in her "Woven Quilt Series." This altering of the weaving after the loom also extended to felting and embroidery. Robertson wrote that the artist's work On the Wane (1999) shows the consideration that she put into her works through the small details of embroidery which finish the tapestry.

== Selected public collections ==
Harris' works are in numerous collections such as Rideau Hall Residence Collection, the Canadian Museum of Civilization, the Canada Art Bank, the Department of External Affairs Canada, SaskTel, the City of Regina, the University of Saskatchewan, Remai Modern, and SK Arts.

== List of exhibitions ==
- Dimensions '84, 1984, Saskatchewan Craft Council, Saskatoon SK, Group Show
- Fabrications, 1986, The John Black Arid Gallery, Toronto ON, Group Show
- Small Expressions, 1986, St.Lawrence Center for the Arts, Toronto, ON, Group Show
- Saskatchewan Open '86, 1986, Mendel Art Gallery, Saskatoon SK, Group Show
- Dimensions '86, 1986, Saskatchewan Craft Council, Saskatoon SK, Group Show
- Craft Focus 2, 1986, Ontario Crafts Council, Toronto ON, Group Show
- Black and White, 1986, Saskatchewan Craft Council, Saskatoon SK, Group Show
- Then and Now, 1986, Saskatchewan Craft Council, Saskatoon SK, Group Show
- Here and Now: Canadian Fiber Art, 1986, The Gallery and Library, Cambridge ON, Group Show
- Dimensions: Fiber, 1986, Musée Marsil Museum, St-Lambert QC, Group Show
- Dimensions '87, 1987, Saskatchewan Craft Council, Saskatoon SK, Group Show
- Commonwealth Collection, 1987, Vancouver Art Gallery, Vancouver BC, Group Show
- 1988, Craftspace, Manitoba Crafts Council, Winnipeg MB, Solo
- Dimensions '88, 1988, Saskatchewan Craft Council, Saskatoon SK, Group Show
- Contemporary Murals, 1988, Center des Arts Visuels, Montreal QC, Group Show
- Spotlight '88, 1988, The Exchange District, Winnipeg MB, Group Show
- Collaborations, 1988, Saskatchewan Craft Council, Saskatoon SK, Group Show
- Northern Comfort, 1988, Saskatchewan Craft Council, Saskatoon SK, Solo Show
- Northern Comfort, 1988-1989, Touring Saskatchewan, Solo Show
- Dimensions '89, 1989, Saskatchewan Craft Council, Saskatoon SK, Group Show
- Saskatchewan Open '90, 1990, Mendel Art Gallery, Saskatoon S, Group Show
- Dimensions '90, 1990, Saskatchewan Craft Council, Saskatoon SK, Group Show
- Something New on Broadway, 1990, Saskatchewan Craft Council, Saskatoon SK, Group Show
- 1991, Cosmo Civic Center, Saskatoon SK, Group Show
- In Place: Craft from Saskatchewan, 1991, Saskatchewan Craft Council, Saskatoon SK, Group Show
- 1991, Gallery Framers Inc, Saskatoon SK, Solo Show
- A Treasury of Canadian Craft, 1992, Canadian Craft Museum, Vancouver BC, Group Show
- Saskatchewan Open '92, 1992, Mendel Art Gallery, Saskatoon SK, Group Show
- Dimensions '92, 1992, Saskatchewan Craft Council, Saskatoon SK, Group Show
- Dimensions '93, 1993, Saskatchewan Craft Council, Saskatoon SK, Group Show
- Tapestries 1990-1993, 1993, Mendel Art Gallery, Saskatoon SK, Group Show
- Making Meaning, Art and Craft in Saskatchewan, 1994, National Exhibition Center, Swift Current SK, Group Show
- Dimensions '94, 1994, Saskatchewan Craft Council, Saskatoon SK, Group Show
- Made for a Cause, 1994, Saskatchewan Craft Council, Saskatoon SK, Group Show
- Dimensions '95, 1995, Saskatchewan Craft Council, Saskatoon SK, Group Show
- Veiled Images, 1995, Saskatchewan Craft Council, Saskatoon SK, Solo Show
- Dimensions '97, 1997. Saskatchewan Craft Council, Saskatoon SK. Group Show
- Dimensions '98, 1998. Saskatchewan Craft Council, Saskatoon SK. Group Show
- Soft Wall, 1998. Manitoba Craft Council, Winnipeg MB. Group show
- 1998. Traditions Handicraft Gallery, Regina, SK. Solo Show
- Dimensions '99, 1999. Saskatchewan Craft Council, Saskatoon SK. Group Show
- Arts 2000, 2000. Gallery Stratford, Stratford ON. Group Show
- Dimensions 2000, 2000. Saskatchewan Craft Council, Saskatoon SK. Group Show
- In Prairie Light, 2000. Station Arts Center, Rostern, SK. Solo Show
- Dimensions 2003, 2003. Saskatchewan Craft Council, Saskatoon SK. Group Show
- Dimensions 2004, 2004. Saskatchewan Craft Council, Saskatoon SK. Group Show
- Colour Maps, 2008. Saskatchewan Craft Council, Saskatoon SK. Solo Show
- Prairie Interlace, 2022. Nickle Galleries, University of Calgary, Calgary, AB. Group Show
- Prairie Interlace, 2023. Mann Art Gallery, Prince Albert, SK. Group Show
- Prairie Interlace, 2023. Art Gallery of Southwest Manitoba, Bandon, MB. Group Show
- Prairie Interlace, 2024. MacKenzie Art Gallery, Regina, SK. Travelling Group Show;
- Warp & Weft, A Kaija Sanelma Harris Retrospective, 2024-2025. A joint exhibition between the Saskatchewan Craft Council and the Remai Modern. Solo Show;

== Awards and honours ==
Harris has been the recipient of many awards and grants, including five Dimensions Premier's Prizes and seven Dimensions Merit awards. She was in the top five finalists for the Saidye Bronfman Award in 2001. She received a Canada Council Craft Grant in 1996, a Saskatchewan Arts Board Creative "A" Grant in 1987, and the Saskatchewan Arts Board Travel Grant in 1984.
