= Filmihullu =

Bimonthly film magazine in Helsinki, Finland

- Categories: Film magazine
- Frequency: Bimonthly
- Publisher: Filmihullu ry
- Founded: 1968
- Country: Finland
- Based in: Helsinki
- Language: Finnish
- Website: Filmhullu
- ISSN: 0782-3797
- OCLC: 7500515

Filmihullu (Finnish: Cinephile) is a bimonthly film magazine published in Helsinki, Finland. It is the oldest magazine about films in the country which has been in circulation since 1968.

== History and profile ==
Filmihullu was established in 1968. The headquarters of the magazine is in Helsinki. The publisher of the magazine is Filmihullu ry.

Filmihullu features articles on the history of Finnish cinema and on film festivals. Finnish film historian, critic and documentary filmmaker Peter von Bagh served as the long-time editor-in-chief of the magazine. He was appointed to the post in 1971.

== See also ==
- List of film periodicals
