= Landscape (film) =

2000 Slovak film

Landscape (Slovak: Krajinka) is a 2000 Slovak film directed by Martin Šulík. It was Slovakia's submission to the 73rd Academy Awards for the Academy Award for Best Foreign Language Film, but was not accepted as a nominee. Its film score, by Vladimír Godár, won the Georges Delerue Award at the Film Fest Gent festival in 2001.

== See also ==
- Cinema of Slovakia
- List of submissions to the 73rd Academy Awards for Best Foreign Language Film
