= Glamour (2000 film) =

Glamour is a 2000 Hungarian film written and directed by Frigyes Gödrös. It was Hungary's submission to the 73rd Academy Awards for the Academy Award for Best Foreign Language Film, but was not accepted as a nominee.

== See also ==
- Cinema of Hungary
- List of submissions to the 73rd Academy Awards for Best Foreign Language Film
