= The Raven's Dance =

1980 film

- Directed by: Markku Lehmuskallio
- Written by: Markku Lehmuskallio
- Produced by: Markku Lehmuskallio
- Starring: Pertti Kalinainen
- Cinematography: Markku Lehmuskallio
- Edited by: Juho Gartz
- Release date: 14 March 1980
- Running time: 79 minutes
- Country: Finland
- Language: Finnish

The Raven's Dance (Finnish: Korpinpolska) is a 1980 Finnish film directed by Markku Lehmuskallio. It was entered into the 30th Berlin International Film Festival, where it won an Honourable Mention.

== Cast ==
- Pertti Kalinainen as Petteri
- Paavo Katajasaari as The father
- Hilkka Matikainen as Hilkka
- Eero Kemilä as Forester
- Mari Holappa as Neighbor
- Heikki Holappa as Neighbor
