= Anastasia Lapsui =

Nenets film director, screenwriter and radio journalist

- Анастасия Лапсуй
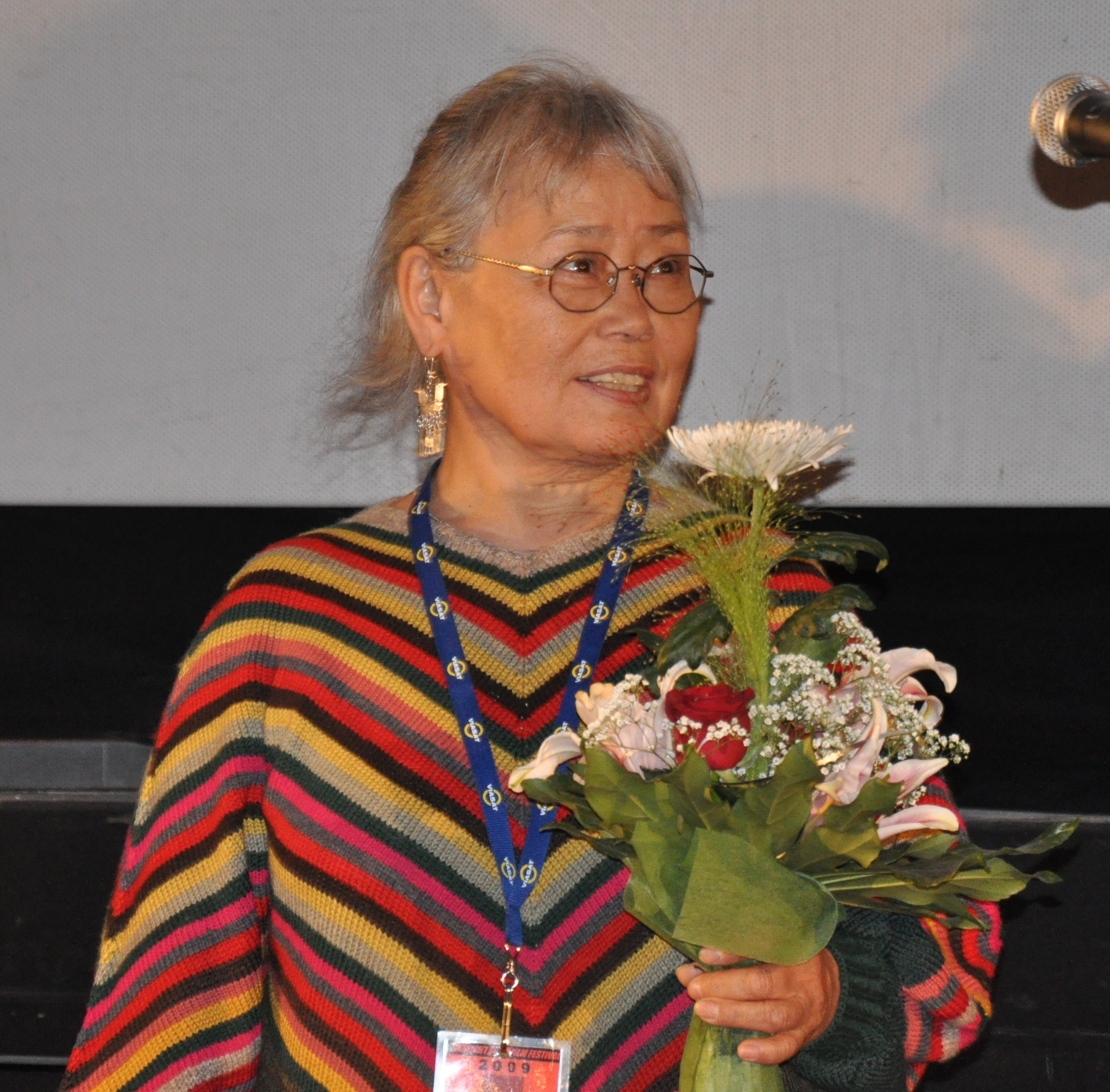
- Lapsui in 2009
- Born: 1944 (age 81–82); Nida, Yamalo-Nenets Autonomous Okrug, Russian SFSR, Soviet Union
- Education: Ural State University
- Occupations: film director, screenwriter, and radio journalist
- Spouse: Markku Lehmuskallio

Anastasia Timofeyevna Lapsui (Russian: Анастасия Тимофеевна Лапсуй; born 1944) is a Soviet-born Nenets film director, screenwriter, and radio journalist who has lived in Finland since 1993. Lapsui, together with Markku Lehmuskallio, directed "Seven Songs from the Tundra," the first narrative film in the Nenets language. Lapsui has won numerous honors, including the Jussi Award for Best Film, and the Grand Prize at the Créteil International Women's Film Festival.

== Biography ==
Anastasia Lapsui was born to a nomadic family in Nida, Yamalo-Nenets Autonomous Okrug, northwest of Siberia, in 1944. She graduated from Ural State University in Sverdlovsk Oblast. Early in her career, she was a radio reporter in the city of Salekhard, and also wrote screenplays. Together with her spouse, Markku Lehmuskallio, they have directed more than 10 films about the Nenets, the Sami, and other indigenous peoples from around the world. Of the movie Matkalla (On the Way), completed in 2007, Lapsui says:— "This movie has a special meaning to me. In it, I present my own view of the Nenets religion and the afterlife."

== Awards ==
- 2000, Best Film (Nordic), Amanda Award
- 2000, Grand Prize, Créteil International Women's Film Festival
- 2001, Best Film, Jussi Awards
- 2005, Best International Feature, Birds Eye View Award
- 2009, Suomi-palkinto (Finland Award)
- 2014, Taiteilijaeläke (Artist pension)

== Filmography ==
- 1993, Poron hahmossa pitkin taivaankaarta (editing, music, narrator, recording)
- 1994, Kadotettu paratiisi (planning, Nenets / Finnish translations, editing, recording)
- 1995, Jäähyväisten kronikka (editing)
- 1997, Anna (directing, manuscript)
- 1998, The Sacrifice: A Film About a Forest (directing, planning, recording, editing)
- 1999, Seven Songs from the Tundra (directing, costume, cut, staging, manuscript)
- 2001, Shepherd (directing, manuscript)
- 2002, Mothers of Life (directing, editing, voice, songs)
- 2003, A Bride of the Seventh Heaven (directing, costume, manuscript)
- 2004, Fata Morgana (directing, editing, recording, manuscript)
- 2006, The Sami (guidance, editing)
- 2007, Matkalla (directing, screenplay, actor)
- 2007, Nedarma - Travelling (directing, screenplay)
- 2009, Earth Evocation
- 2010, Pudana Last of the Line
- 2012, 11 Images of a Human
- 2015, Tsamo
- 2017, Pyhä (credited as Anastasia Lapsuy)

== See also ==
- List of Amanda Award winners
- List of Finnish submissions for the Academy Award for Best Foreign Language Film
- List of Inti Films films
- Jussi Award for Best Film
- List of submissions to the 73rd Academy Awards for Best Foreign Language Film
