= Markku Lehmuskallio =

Finnish film director

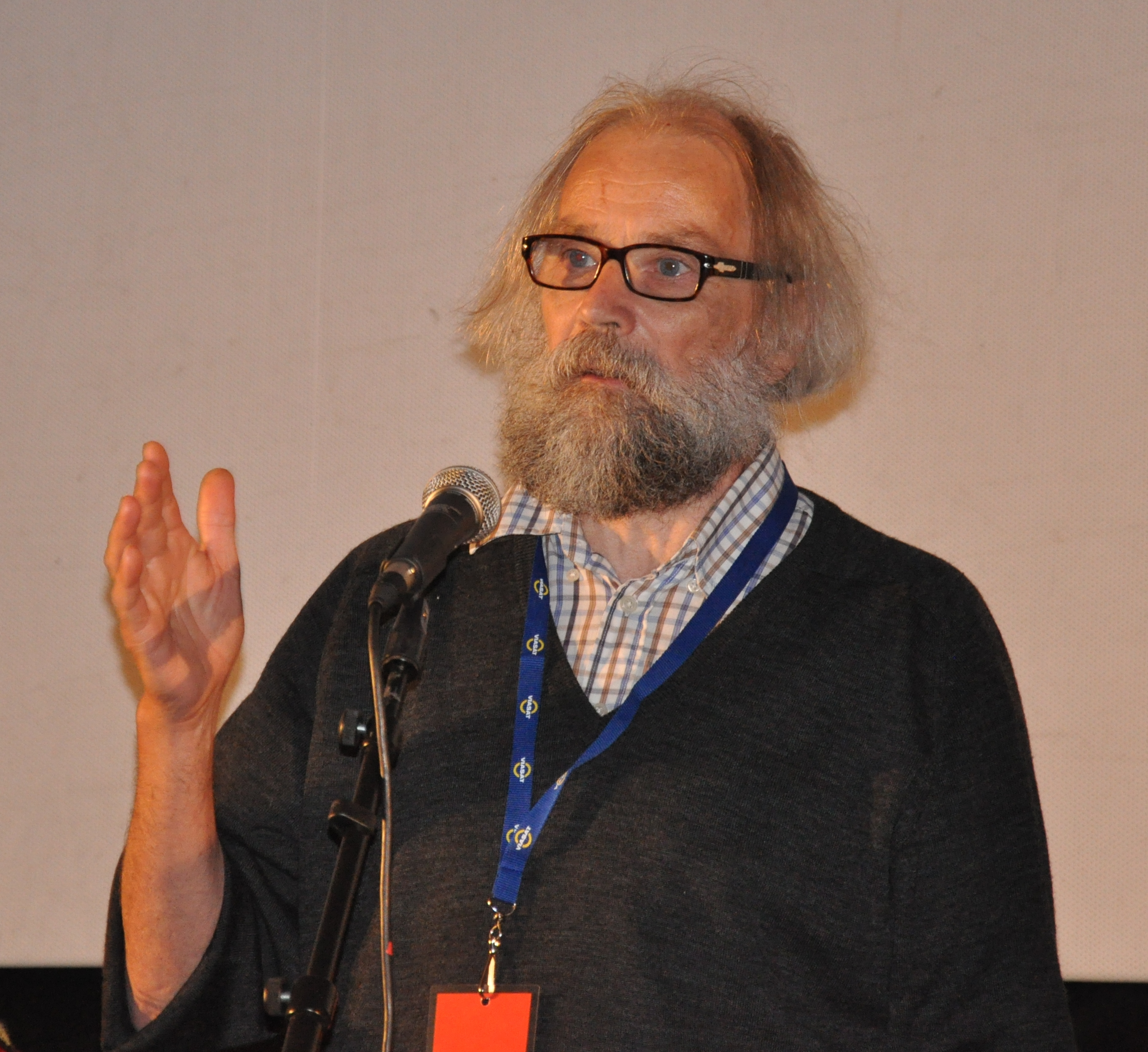
- Markku Lehmuskallio (2009)
- Born: 31 December 1938 (age 87); Rauma, Finland
- Occupations: Film director Cinematographer; Screenwriter
- Years active: 1973–present
- Spouse: Anastasia Lapsui

Markku Lehmuskallio (born 31 December 1938) is a Finnish film director, cinematographer and screenwriter. He has directed 26 films since 1973. Together with his spouse, Anastasia Lapsui, they have directed more than 10 films about the Nenets, the Sami, and other indigenous peoples from around the world. His 1980 film The Raven's Dance was entered into the 30th Berlin International Film Festival, where it won an Honourable Mention.

== Selected filmography ==
- The Raven's Dance (1980)
- Seven Songs from the Tundra (1999)
- Nedarma – Travelling (2007)
