= Spirit in the Sky (disambiguation) =

"Spirit in the Sky" is a 1969 song by Norman Greenbaum, which was later covered by other artists.

Spirit in the Sky may also refer to:

- "Spirit in the Sky" (Keiino song), Norwegian entry in the Eurovision Song Contest 2019
- Spirit in the Sky, a 1969 album by Norman Greenbaum
- Spirits in the Sky, a band formed in 2009, led by Billy Corgan of the Smashing Pumpkins

== See also ==
- Spirit of the sky or sky deity
