= Your Mother Should Know =

- Cover of the Northern Songs sheet music

Song by the Beatles

from the EP and album Magical Mystery Tour
- Released: 27 November 1967 (US LP); 8 December 1967 (UK EP)
- Recorded: 22–23 August and 29 September 1967
- Studio: Chappell and EMI, London
- Genre: Music hall; vaudeville-rock; psychedelic pop
- Length: 2:29
- Label: Parlophone (UK), Capitol (US)
- Songwriter: Lennon–McCartney
- Producer: George Martin

"Your Mother Should Know" is a song by the English rock band the Beatles, from their 1967 EP and LP, Magical Mystery Tour. It was written by Paul McCartney and credited to Lennon–McCartney. Titled after a line in the 1961 film A Taste of Honey, its lyrical premise centres on the history of hit songs across generations. McCartney said he wrote it as a plea for generational understanding and respect for a mother's life experience. In the Magical Mystery Tour television film, the song serves as a big production number in the style of a 1930s Hollywood musical. Some commentators view the sequence as cultural satire, as the Beatles are seen dancing and dressed in white evening tails.

"Your Mother Should Know" is written in the music hall style, as was McCartney's earlier composition, "When I'm Sixty-Four". The initial sessions for "Your Mother Should Know" took place at Chappell Recording Studios in London, towards the end of August. The group were visited there by their manager, Brian Epstein, the last time he joined them in the studio before his death on 27 August.

== Background and inspiration ==
Paul McCartney began writing "Your Mother Should Know" on a harmonium at his house in St John's Wood, London, in the company of his Aunty Jin and Uncle Harry, and drew on his father's love of music hall. The conversation he had with his family members that day inspired the subject matter of the song. Its lyrical premise centres on the history of hit songs across generations. McCartney took the title from a line in the 1961 film A Taste of Honey, which tells of a white teenage girl who falls pregnant with a black man's child and withholds news of the pregnancy from her domineering mother. (Note: The Beatles recorded the film's theme song, "A Taste of Honey", in 1963 for their debut album, Please Please Me. Author Ian MacDonald describes "A Taste of Honey" as one of McCartney's "mainstream fancies of the period" and comments that "the film's wry vision of sentimental self-sufficiency appealed strongly" to him.)

Discussing "Your Mother Should Know" in his 1997 authorised biography, Many Years from Now, McCartney said he sought to address the issue of generational barriers. He lamented how an argument between a mother and her child could have enduring consequences for their relationship, and added: "So I was advocating peace between the generations ... I was basically trying to say, your mother might know more than you think she does. Give her credit".

McCartney said he envisaged the song as a "production number" while planning the Beatles' 1967 television film Magical Mystery Tour. After the band finished recording the film's title song in May that year, the project lay dormant because John Lennon and George Harrison had little enthusiasm for it. McCartney first offered "Your Mother Should Know" as the Beatles' contribution to the Our World satellite broadcast in June, but the band favoured Lennon's "All You Need Is Love" for its social significance.

== Composition ==
On the Beatles' recording, "Your Mother Should Know" is performed in the key of A minor and its time signature is 4/4. The use of piano crotchet chords is typical of McCartney's compositions of the time, starting with "Got to Get You into My Life" in 1966. The song's rhythm suggests a foxtrot, a quality it shares with "Catcall" (formerly titled "Catwalk"), a McCartney-written instrumental recorded by Chris Barber's trad jazz band in July 1967. Musicologist Walter Everett comments that the two pieces also share a "syncopated ascending octave-arpeggiation of a minor triad". The composition consists of verse-chorus sections contrasted with instrumental bridges. One of the verse-choruses includes vocalised "da-da-da"s in place of lyrics, representing the singalong tradition of music hall.

According to music historian Joe Harrington, the song is an example of rock music's embrace of vaudeville in the late 1960s, which was part of the genre's development away from its rock 'n' roll roots in favour of eclecticism and a more artistic aesthetic. (Note: Other examples cited by Harrington as "Vaudeville-Rock" are the New Vaudeville Band's "Winchester Cathedral", Dr. West's Medicine Show and Junk Band's "The Eggplant That Ate Chicago", Donovan's "Mellow Yellow", Sopwith Camel's "Hello, Hello", the Rainy Daze's "That Acapulco Gold" and the Monkees' "D.W. Washburn".) The song's music hall aspect recalls McCartney's "When I'm Sixty-Four" from the Beatles' Sgt. Pepper's Lonely Hearts Club Band album. Its lyrical theme repeats the sympathetic portrayal of a parent offered in "She's Leaving Home" from the same album. In author Doyle Greene's view, whereas "She's Leaving Home" conveys sympathy for a teenage runaway and her parents, the generational understanding espoused in "Your Mother Should Know" is more one-sided and suggests "maternal authority and youth compliance".

== Recording ==
The Beatles began recording "Your Mother Should Know" on 22 August 1967, their first session in close to two months. The recording took place at Chappell Recording Studios in central London because EMI Studios was unavailable at short notice. Although the Beatles had never worked at Chappell before, McCartney had participated in the session there for "Catcall" the previous month.

Recording continued at Chappell on 23 August. The overdubs included backing vocals by Lennon, McCartney and Harrison, which, according to music critic Tim Riley, give the performance a "parodic irreverence". That session was the last time that Brian Epstein, the group's manager, visited them in a recording studio. Following Epstein's death on 27 August, the Beatles committed to making Magical Mystery Tour because as McCartney insisted the band needed to focus on a new creative project.

The Beatles devoted a 16 September session at EMI Studios to remaking "Your Mother Should Know" because McCartney was dissatisfied with the earlier version. The remake was discarded, however, because he and Lennon completed overdubs on the Chappell recording on 29 September. McCartney added bass guitar while Lennon overdubbed Hammond organ, the latter filling out the song's vocal-less bridge sections. Mixing was completed on 7 November, with panning variation applied to the vocals in the stereo mix.

== Sequence in Magical Mystery Tour ==
In the Magical Mystery Tour film, the song supports an old-fashioned dance segment that McCartney called "the Busby Berkeley ending". It was filmed on 24 September, at the end of a six-day shoot at RAF West Malling, a Royal Air Force base in Kent. McCartney had intended to shoot the scene at Shepperton Studios, outside London, but the Beatles failed to appreciate that film studios needed to be booked in advance. Tony Bramwell, the film's production manager, recalled having a staircase for the sequence assembled on scaffolding inside a disused aircraft hangar, which was the most elaborate set piece in the film. Around 160 dancers from Peggy Spencer's formation dancing team, and 24 female RAF cadets, were hired as extras. The formation dancers were regulars on the TV show Come Dancing, and were brought in by bus from Birmingham, Cardiff and Newcastle for the shoot. According to Maurice Gibb of the Bee Gees, McCartney got the idea for the Beatles' costumes from seeing him perform in concert with the Bee Gees, dressed all in white. The band rehearsed their dance routine for most of the day but the generators failed just as filming got underway. Gavrik Losey, a production assistant on the film, said that, while the generators were repaired, the dancers were "bribed" into staying late with Beatles autographs.

The Beatles, surrounded by members of Peggy Spencer's formation dancing team, in the satirical film sequence

The sequence starts with the Beatles coming down a grand staircase in white evening tails. After they descend, a line of female RAF cadets march through the shot and the band continue to mime to the song, surrounded by a crowd of ballroom dancers. Lennon, Harrison and Ringo Starr are wearing red carnations, while McCartney's is black. The carnation difference later contributed to the "Paul is dead" urban legend. Towards the end of the sequence, McCartney steps forward from his bandmates and indulges in a dance of his own while the others continue the basic routine. Greene writes that, in contrast to McCartney's obvious enjoyment, Lennon and Harrison's facial expressions suggest "they'd rather be anywhere else" than filming the scene. (Note: Lennon later objected to McCartney delegating him scenes to write to work with his outline for the film, and said, "George and I were sort of grumbling, you know, 'Fuckin' movie, oh well, we better do it.'" Harrison recalled that he was "in another world" during Magical Mystery Tour and that it was mainly McCartney pushing his ideas, but he enjoyed filming "Your Mother Should Know" nevertheless.)

According to film studies academic Bob Neaverson, the sequence is a pastiche of 1930s Hollywood musicals, particularly Berkeley's Gold Diggers series of films. In Greene's view, the sequence masks the sense of old-fashioned compliance in "Your Mother Should Know". He cites the entrance of the young RAF cadets, amid the throng of formally dressed dancers, as an example of the scene having "a satirical undercurrent and [addressing] the fissures of late 1960s politics". Film-maker Anthony Wall, commenting on the 2012 DVD reissue of Magical Mystery Tour, also recognised the sequence as a subtle satire of British culture. He said of the Beatles: "All this Come Dancing stuff, the girls in uniforms, and coming down a staircase in white suits is kind of ridiculous, but they're also revelling in the peculiarity of it."

== Release ==
"Your Mother Should Know", and the five other songs from the film, were compiled for release on the Magical Mystery Tour double EP, except in the United States. There, Capitol Records chose to create an LP by augmenting those songs with the Beatles' non-album single tracks from 1967. The Capitol release took place on 27 November 1967, while Parlophone issued the EP on 8 December. Already familiar to fans before the film's debut, the soundtrack record was a commercial success.

The BBC scheduled Magical Mystery Tour for prime-time viewing during the Christmas holiday season, during which regular programming usually consisted of family sitcoms and variety shows. (Note: In McCartney's description, it was "traditionally music hall and Bruce Forsyth and Jimmy Tarbuck time".) The film was broadcast in the UK on BBC1 on 26 December, but in black and white rather than colour. It was savaged by reviewers, earning the Beatles their first public and critical failure. As a result of the unfavourable reviews, networks in the US declined to show the film.

According to author Barry Miles, Magical Mystery Tour baffled the British public because "many viewers were assuming that the show would be the kind of song-and-dance spectacular that the closing 'Your Mother Should Know' sequence satirised." Peter Brown, an executive at Epstein's company NEMS, was critical of the project's disorganisation and McCartney's extravagance when filming his "top hat and cane dance number" and the segment for "The Fool on the Hill". He said that "if Brian had been alive, it never would have happened the way it did." (Note: Brown also said he had advocated for cancelling the film and writing off the £40,000 production costs (equivalent to £637,365 in 2025), but McCartney was convinced that it would be warmly received.)

== Reception ==
Bob Dawbarn of Melody Maker described the Magical Mystery Tour EP as "six tracks which no other pop group in the world could begin to approach for originality combined with the popular touch". He said that "Your Mother Should Know" was "one of the two most instantly attractive songs", the other being "The Fool on the Hill", with "a tune that sticks in the memory first time round". In Record Mirror, Norman Jopling wrote: "'Your Mother Should Know' is [a] medium tempo ballad with a corny sort of tune – but the atmosphere developed is fantastic. It's a hazy, stoned kind of sensation which reminds you of hearing old tunes, in smoky rooms ..."

Among reviews of the American LP, Richard Goldstein of The New York Times complained that the new songs furthered the "electronic posturing" of Sgt. Pepper and showed the Beatles overly focused on motif and overall effect. He said that "Magical Mystery Tour" and "its nostalgic refrain, 'Your Mother Should Know'" were "motifs disguised as songs", adding: "Both declare their moods (in stock musical phrases) but neither succeeds in establishing them. Instead, these cuts are as tedious and stuffy as an after-dinner speech." Writing in Esquire, Robert Christgau considered three of the soundtrack songs to be "disappointing", particularly "The Fool on the Hill", but cited the "tender camp of 'Your Mother Should Know'" as one of the reasons to buy the album. Rex Reed, in a highly unfavourable review of the LP for HiFi/Stereo Review, did not care for the track at all, calling it "nothing more than a Gaslight Era cabaret tune full of da-das and yeah-yeahs".

In Tim Riley's view, the Magical Mystery Tour songs were largely uninspired recreations of Sgt. Pepper, and he described "Your Mother Should Know" as "'When I'm Sixty-Four' in knickers". He said that although the harmonic ideas are "bright and clever", the instrumental bridges interrupt rather than complement the verses, and the inclusion of the "da-da-da" singalong "make[s] it sound like a demo with dummy lyrics". Jonathan Gould also saw the soundtrack as a lesser version of Sgt. Pepper and described "Your Mother Should Know" as a "halfhearted attempt at satiric nostalgia in the style of 'When I'm Sixty-Four'". He said the song appeared unfinished and, while it served its purpose in the film, and showed Starr to be "the leading vaudeville drummer in rock", the track was "lackluster" on record. Ian MacDonald considered the stereo panning to be innovative but also a ruse "to conceal the fact that its author hadn't managed to think up a middle eight". He viewed that as indicative of the effects of McCartney's LSD intake in the months following Sgt. Pepper, notwithstanding his efforts to arrest the Beatles' apathy when they regrouped after their summer break to record the track.

== Other versions ==
The song has been covered by artists such as Kenny Ball and His Jazzmen, Phyllis Newman, Bud Shank, Travis Shook and Mike Batt. In 1989, "Weird Al" Yankovic parodied the Magical Mystery Tour dance sequence in his music video for the title track of his album UHF – Original Motion Picture Soundtrack and Other Stuff.

The Beatles' discarded 16 September remake of the song was included on their 1996 outtakes compilation Anthology 2. The arrangement includes McCartney playing harmonium, rather than piano, and what music critic Richie Unterberger calls "the peculiar use of stilted, martial drumming" by Starr. McCartney first performed "Your Mother Should Know" in concert on 4 May 2013, when he opened his Out There! world tour at the Estádio Mineirão in Belo Horizonte, Brazil.

== Personnel ==
According to Ian MacDonald:

- Paul McCartney – lead and backing vocals, piano, bass guitar
- John Lennon – backing vocals, Hammond organ
- George Harrison – backing vocals, lead guitar
- Ringo Starr – drums, tambourine
