= Ganes (film) =

2007 Finnish biographical film

- Directed by: Jukka-Pekka Siili
- Screenplay by: Antero Arjatsalo
- Story by: Pentti Kasurinen
- Produced by: Aleksi Bardy
- Starring: Eero Milonoff; Jussi Nikkilä; Olavi Uusivirta; Timo Tikka
- Cinematography: Jarkko T. Laine
- Edited by: Joona Louhivuori
- Music by: Hurriganes; Rikhard Murto; Henri Wilkinson
- Production company: Helsinki-filmi
- Distributed by: FS Film
- Release date: 28 September 2007 (Finland)
- Running time: 107 minutes
- Country: Finland
- Language: Finnish
- Budget: €1,420,571
- Box office: €1,408,889

Ganes is a 2007 Finnish biographical film directed by Jukka-Pekka Siili. The film is about Finnish rock band Hurriganes, told from the point of view of drummer/vocalist Remu Aaltonen.

The Blu-ray Disc version of Ganes was released on 11 July 2008, making it the first Finnish film released on Blu-ray.

== Cast ==
- Eero Milonoff as Remu Aaltonen
- Jussi Nikkilä as Albert Järvinen
- Olavi Uusivirta as Cisse Häkkinen
- Timo Tikka as Ile Kallio
- Tommi Korpela as Otto Aaltonen, Remu's father
- Minttu Mustakallio as Eeva Aaltonen, Remu's mother
- Kristiina Elstelä as Remu's grandmother
- Kari Hietalahti as Hurme
- Reino Nordin as Heka
- Leena Pöysti as Satu
- Mervi Takatalo as Paula
- Jope Ruonansuu as Remu's boss
- Daniel Dewald as Richard Stanley
- Martti Syrjä as a warden
