= Roadrunner (Hurriganes album) =

Studio album by Hurriganes
- Released: November 1974
- Recorded: September 1974, Marcus Music -studios, Stockholm, Sweden
- Genre: Rock and roll Rhythm and blues Blues rock
- Label: Love Records (FIN)
- Producer: Richard Stanley

Hurriganes chronology
Rock and Roll All Night Long (1973)	Roadrunner (1974)	Crazy Days (1975)

Singles from Roadrunner
- 1. ""Get On" / "Mister X" Released: December 1974; 2. "I Will Stay" / "Roadrunner" Released: Spring 1975; 3. "Tallahassee Lassie" / "It Ain’t What You Do" Released: August 1975

Roadrunner is an album released by the Finnish rock band Hurriganes in 1974. It is considered one of the most influential albums in Finnish rock music history. It was the best-selling Finnish album from 1974 to 1985 and has sold over 170,000 copies in Finland. The album was recorded in Stockholm, Sweden at Marcus Music studios. The album cover features the band members sitting on a backseat of a Cadillac in Ruskeasuo, Helsinki. The cover has been chosen many times as the best album cover in Finland.

== Track listing ==
All songs written and composed by Hurriganes, except where noted.

Side A
No.	Title	Length
1.	"It Ain't What You Do"	2:57
2.	"Hey Groupie"	2:31
3.	"Tallahassee Lassie" (Bob Crewe, Frank Slay, Frederick Picariello)	2:17
4.	"The Phone Rang" (Mister X)	1:37
5.	"I Will Stay" (Lundgren)	2:40
6.	"Get On"	3:43

Side B
No.	Title	Length
7.	"In the Nude" (Garland)	2:35
8.	"Mister X" (Mister X, Hurriganes)	4:01
9.	"Slippin' and Slidin'" (Little Richard)	2:37
10.	"Oowee-Oohla"	2:29
11.	"Roadrunner" (Bo Diddley)	4:16

== Chart positions ==
Country	Peak position	Starting date
Finland	1	December 1974

== Personnel ==
- Remu Aaltonen – Lead vocals, drums
- Albert Järvinen – Guitar
- Cisse Häkkinen – Bass guitar, Backing vocals, Lead vocals in tracks 4, 5. Acoustic guitar in the song "I will stay"
- Richard Stanley (”Mister X”) – vocals in ”Mister X”, producer
- Leif Måses – Recorder

== See also ==
- List of best-selling albums in Finland
