= Get On =

Single by Hurriganes
- A-side: "Get On"
- Released: December 1974
- Recorded: September 1974; Marcus Music, Stockholm
- Genre: Rock
- Length: 3:43
- Label: Love Records
- Songwriter(s): Remu Aaltonen, Cisse Häkkinen, Albert Järvinen
- Producer(s): Richard Stanley

Hurriganes singles chronology
"Blue Suede Shoes"	"Get On"	"I Will Stay"

"Get On" is a song written and recorded by the Finnish rock band Hurriganes in September 1974. It appeared on their second album, entitled Roadrunner. It was originally supposed to be just a filler, as the number of tracks recorded at that stage was deemed insufficient to fill a complete album. According to Remu Aaltonen, both the music and the words were the result of improvisation, when producer Richard Stanley wanted the band to come up with one more song.

However, according to Stanley, the band had been playing the song live already during the previous summer, months before the recording sessions in Stockholm. There exist recordings made by people in the audiences during the summer of 1974, and the song appears on these recordings.

The words of this song consist of some kind of "Rock Esperanto". There are words and phrases from the English language, but also non-sense words, and the syntax of proper English is not used systematically. Also, it is not possible to assign a sensible meaning to the lyrics. This situation arose from the deficient knowledge of English by the singer, Remu Aaltonen. The words were supposed to be replaced later by proper English, and Aaltonen's words were only meant for a demo recording. However, the other members of the band, as well as the producer, thought that the delivery was strong, and decided to stick to those words, despite opposition from Aaltonen. The unique words are part of the charm of the song.

The guitar intro is a version of the intro of Chuck Berry's "Johnny B. Goode", as Aaltonen instructed Albert Järvinen to kick the song off with this riff. The rhythm guitar the vocal harmonies of the middle eight were overdubbed, otherwise the song was recorded in one take.

"Get On" is one of the best known songs by Hurriganes. It is usually heard on every gig that the band plays. It is often among the top songs when Finnish rock songs are discussed in the media, and it was voted the best Hurriganes song in the vote "The Greatest Bands" of the Finnish radio station Radio Rock.

The song won the European Pop Jury competition in 1974.

== Line-up ==
- Remu Aaltonen – drums, vocals
- Cisse Häkkinen – bass guitar, background vocal
- Albert Järvinen – guitar

== Cover versions ==
The song has been played by

- Hard Rock Sallinen (late 1970s, early 1980s)
- Leningrad Cowboys on the album We Cum from Brooklyn (1992)
- The New Duncan Imperials on the album The Best Of Mikhael Jackson (1993)
