= Milonoff =

Milonoff is a surname. Notable people with the surname include:

- Eero Milonoff (born 1980), Finnish actor
- Pekka Milonoff (born 1947), Finnish theatre and film director
- Tuomas Milonoff (born 1974), Finnish television director, presenter, and producer
