= Laughing at the Pieces =

Studio album by Doctor and the Medics
- Released: 1986
- Recorded: 1986
- Genre: Glam rock, neo-psychedelia
- Length: 33:38
- Label: I.R.S. (US, Canada, UK); Illegal (Greece, Spain, Australia & New Zealand)
- Producer: Craig Leon assisted by Cassell Webb

Doctor and the Medics chronology
Laughing at the Pieces (1986)	I Keep Thinking It's Tuesday (1987)

Professional ratings
Review scores
Source	Rating
AllMusic	1.5/5 stars
Kerrang!	1/5 stars

Laughing at the Pieces is the 1986 debut album by Doctor and the Medics. It reached #55 in Canada.

== U.K. Track listing ==
( Issued as: MIRG1010 - IRS Records Ltd. (1986) & MIRGP1010 (Picture Disc.) - IRS Records Ltd. (1986)

=== Side One ===
1. "No-one Loves You When You've Got No Shoes" – 3:37
2. "Kettle on a Long Chain" – 3:00
3. "Come On Call Me" – 2:35
4. "Watermelon Runaway" – 2:29
5. "Fried Egg Bad Monday" – 4:09
6. "Burn" - 3:29 (extra track on picture disc edition)

All songs written by The Doctor/Ritchie/McGuire/Searle/West

=== Side Two ===
1. "Spirit in the Sky" * – 3:35
2. "Lucky Lord Jim" – 2:47
3. "Moon Song" – 4:42
4. "Barbara Can't Dance" – 2:37
5. "Smallness of the Mustard Pot" – 4:07

All songs written by The Doctor/Ritchie/McGuire/Searle/West, except * written by Norman Greenbaum

== U.S.Track listing ==
( Issued as: I.R.S.5797 - (1986) I.R.S.Records Inc.)

=== Side One ===
1. "Spirit In The Sky" - 3:35
2. "Lucky Lord Jim" - 2:47
3. "Nobody Loves You When You've Got No Shoes" - 3:37
4. "Moon Song" - 4:42
5. "Watermelon Runaway" - 2:29

=== Side Two ===
1. "Burn" - 3:29
2. "Kettle On A Long Chain" - 3:00
3. "Miracle Of The Age" - 3:53
4. "Come On Call Me" - 2:35
5. "Smallness of the Mustard Pot" - 4:07

All songs credited to The Doctor-Ritchie-McGuire-Searle-West, except "Spirit In The Sky" by Norman Greenbaum.

== Singles ==
This album spawned two singles, with supporting music videos.

=== "Spirit In The Sky" ===
- 7" U.K. Single: "Spirit In The Sky" / "Laughing At The Pieces (Studio Version)" - IRM113 / IRS Records Ltd.

( A Side: written by Norman Greenbaum, B Side: written by Doctor-McGuire-Searle-Ritchie-West)

- 12" U.K. Single:"Spirit In The Sky" - IRMT113 / IRS Records Ltd. (Issued in Poster Sleeve)
1. A "Spirit In The Sky" * - 3:29
2. A "Laughing At The Pieces (Studio Version)" - 3:20
3. B "Love Piece And Bananas (Live)" - 3:54
4. B "Happy But Twisted (Live)" - 2:03
5. B "Fried Egg, Bad Monday (Live)" - 4:03
6. B "Good Golly Miss Molly (Live)" ** - 4:56

( All songs written by Doctor-McGuire-Searle-Ritchie-West, except, * by Norman Greenbaum & ** by Blackwell / Marascalco)

=== "Burn" ===
- 7" U.K. Single: "Burn" / "Captain Frazer" - IRM119 / IRS Records Ltd. (U.S. single replaces "Captain Frazer" with "Barbara Can't Dance")

( Both songs credited to Doctor-McGuire-Searle-Ritchie-West)

- 12" U.K. Single:"Burn" - IRMT119 / IRS Records ltd.
1. A "Burn"
2. A "Captain Frazer"
3. B "Love Peace And Bananas (Studio Version)"
4. B "Paranoid (Live)" *

( All songs credited to Doctor-McGuire-Searle-Ritchie-West, except * by W.Ward, T.Butler, J.Osborne & F.Iommi)

== Personnel ==
Doctor and the Medics

- The Doctor (Clive Jackson) - lead vocals
- Steve McGuire - guitar
- Richard Searle - bass guitar
- Steve "Vom" Ritchie - drums
- Wendi and Colette Anadin - backing vocals
