= Over the Fence =

Over the Fence may refer to:

- Over the Fence (1917 film), a 1917 short comedy film starring Harold Lloyd
- Over the Fence (1923 film), directed by Earl Montgomery
- Over the Fence (1932 film), directed by Lou Breslaw
- Over the Fence (2009 film), a 2009 short Finnish film
- Over the Fence (2016 film), a 2016 Japanese film directed by Nobuhiro Yamashita
- "Over the Fence" (Doctors), a 2004 television episode
