= Eero Milonoff =

Finnish actor (born 1980)

- Born: 1 May 1980 (age 45); Helsinki, Finland
- Other names: Käkä
- Occupation: Actor
- Years active: 1989–present
- Parent: Pekka Milonoff
- Relatives: Juho Milonoff (brother); Tuomas Milonoff (brother)

Eero Milonoff (born 1 May 1980) is a Finnish actor. He won a Guldbagge Award for his role in the 2018 film Border, and he has been a nominee at the Jussi Awards for his roles in the films Ganes (2007) and The Happiest Day in the Life of Olli Mäki (2016).

== Career ==
Born in Helsinki, Milonoff graduated from the Helsinki Theatre Academy in 2005. He works as a freelance actor. In 2008, he was nominated for the Jussi Award for Best Actor for his role in the biopic Ganes as the drummer and vocalist Remu Aaltonen of the rock band Hurriganes. In 2015, Milonoff was nominated for the Golden Venla for Best Actor for his role in a drama series about drugs, Koukussa. He was also nominated for the 2016 Jussi Award for Best Supporting Actor for his role as Finnish boxer Elis Ask in the biographical film The Happiest Day in the Life of Olli Mäki. In 2019, he won the Guldbagge Award for Best Actor in a Supporting Role for his role as a troll, Vore, in the Swedish fantasy film Border.

== Personal life ==
Milonoff's father is the theatre and film director Pekka Milonoff, and he has three brothers: Aleksi, Juho, and Tuomas, of whom the latter two also work in the film and television industry. He is of German, Russian, and Swedish descent on his father's side. His nickname is Käkä.

== Filmography ==
Film performances
Year	Title	Role	Notes
1989	Borderland (Rajamaa)	Boy in the stairway	Docufiction
1994	Rosa Was Here	Masa	Feature film
1994	The Killing of a Cat (Kissan kuolema)	New boy	Feature film
1996	Tomas	Eki	Feature film
1997	The Redemption (Lunastus)	Uima Laapotti	Feature film
2001	A Suburban Tale (Ken tulta pyytää)	Peku	Feature film
2003	Bad Boys: A True Story (Pahat pojat)	Aulis	Feature film
2004	Popular Music (Populärmusik från Vittula)	Johan (age 19)	Feature film
2005	Beauty and the Bastard (Tyttö sinä olet tähti)	Isukki	Feature film
2006	Mystery of the Wolf (Suden arvoitus)	Lompolo	Feature film
2007	Ganes	Henry "Remu" Aaltonen	Feature film
2008	The Home of Dark Butterflies (Tummien perhosten koti)	Salmi	Feature film
2008	Blackout	Civilian serviceman on the roof	Feature film
2009	Over the Fence (Viikko ennen vappua)	Benji	Short film
2010	Priest of Evil (Harjunpää ja pahan pappi)	Petri Haag's voice	Feature film, voice
2011	False Trail (Jägarna 2)	Jari Lipponen	Feature film
2011	Six-Pack Movie (Pussikaljaelokuva)	Henninen	Feature film
2012	Once Upon a Time in the North (Härmä)	Häjy Koskela	Feature film
2012	Ella and Friends (Ella ja kaverit)	Teacher	Feature film
2013	Ella and Friends 2 (Ella ja kaverit 2 – Paterock)	Teacher	Feature film
2014	Yesterday	Miko	Short film
2014	The Fascist (Fasisti)		Short film
2016	The Happiest Day in the Life of Olli Mäki (Hymyilevä mies)	Elis Ask	Feature film
2017	Wendy and the Refugee Neverland	Head of the advertisement office	Feature film
2018	Matti and Sami and the Three Biggest Mistakes in the Universe (Matti und Sami und die drei größten Fehler des Universums)	Jussi Pekkanen	Feature film
2018	Border (Gräns)	Vore	Feature film
2019	Let Her Speak	Eero	Short film
2020	Games People Play (Seurapeli)	Härde	Feature film
2021	Omerta 6/12		Feature film
2022	The Good Driver		Feature film
2023	Four Little Adults (Neljä pientä aikuista)	Matias Johannes Kronström	Feature film
2023	Death Is a Problem for the Living (Peluri – Kuolema on elävien ongelma)	Hakkarainen	Feature film
2023	Hygge!	Jesper	Feature film
2024	Azrael	Luther	Feature film
2024	Get Away	Mats Larsson	Feature film

Television performances
Year	Title	Role	Notes
1997	Vuoroin vieraissa	Hooligan	Television series: 1 episode
1999	July at Last (Mennyt heinäkuu)	Mauri	Television film
2002–2003	Madventures	Coco	Television series: 2 episodes
2009	Der Bär ist los! Die Geschichte von Bruno	Mika, a Finnish bearhunter	Television film
2010	Vastaparit	Roni	Television series: 2 episodes
2015	Koukussa	Karri "Kode" Ketola	Television series: 4 episodes
2017	Fallet	Finnish police officer	Television series: 1 episode
2017	Pää edellä	Police officer	Television series: 1 episode
2018	Deadwind (Karppi)	Tero Jyrkänkoski	Television series: 2 episodes
2019–2021	Modern Men	Jarkko	Television series: 31 episodes
2019	The Happy Hour of the Wolf (Suden hetki)	Nalle	Television series: 8 episodes
2020	White Wall	Atte	Television series: 7 episodes
2021	Welcome to Utmark (Velkommen til Utmark)	Uzi	Television series: 1 episode
2022	Summer of Sorrow (Munkkivuori)	Raikku	Television series: 10 episodes
2023	Piiritys	Harri Raita	Television series: 5 episodes
2024	Pasilan myrkky – Manni	Tero Niemeläinen	Television series: 8 episodes
2024	Fast (Karkurit)	Riku Jalava	Television series: 2 episodes
2024	Cry Wolf (Vargasommar)	Sami	Television series: 6 episodes
