= Congregation Beth Israel (Malden, Massachusetts) =

Orthodox synagogue

- Hebrew: בית ישראל
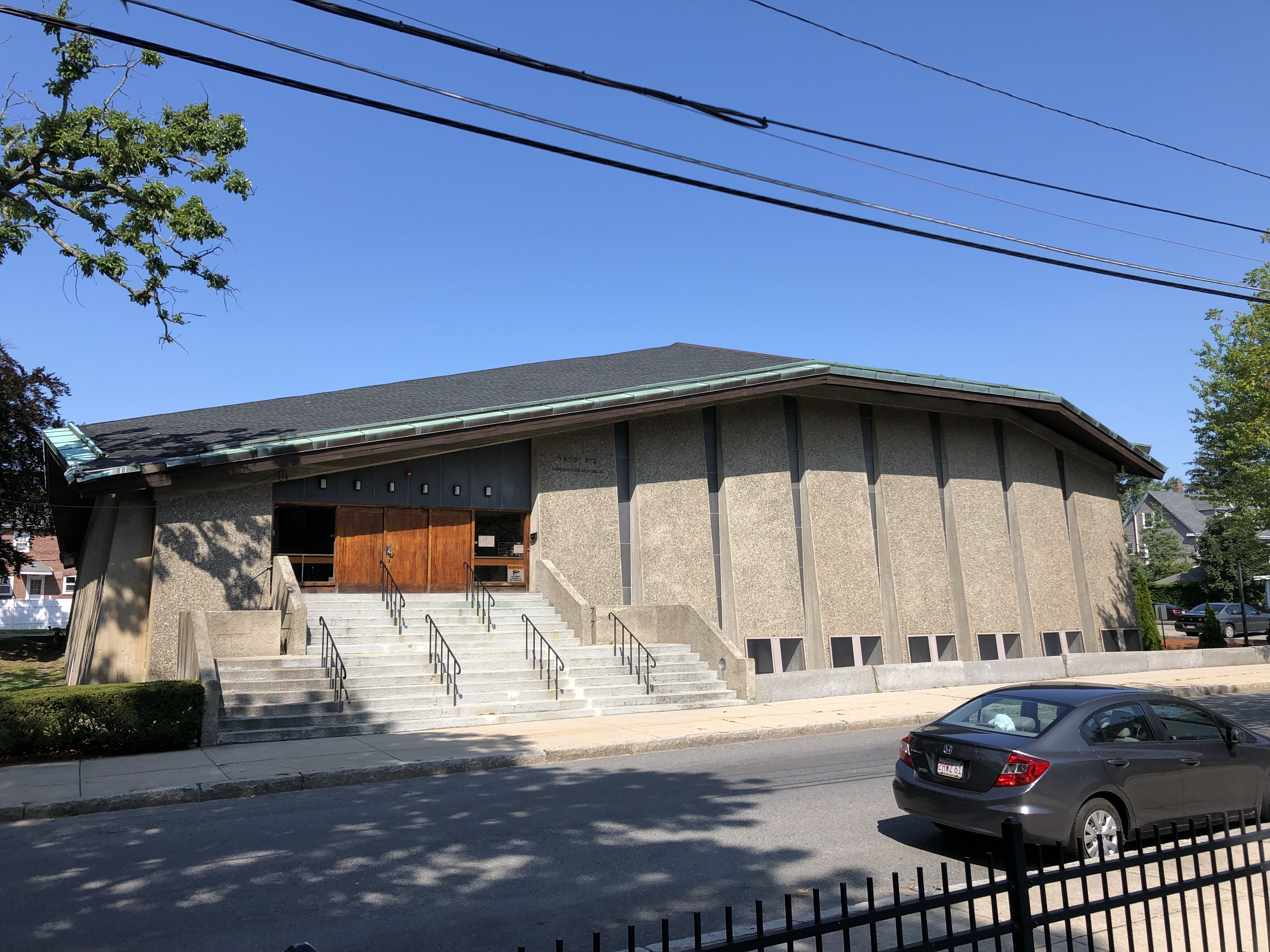
- Beth Israel synagogue in Malden, 2019

- Location in Massachusetts

Religion
- Affiliation: Orthodox Judaism
- Ecclesiastical or organisational status: Synagogue
- Leadership: Rabbi Yitzchak Zev Rabinowitz
- Status: Active

Location
- Location: 10 Dexter Street, Malden, Massachusetts
- Country: United States
- Coordinates: 42°25′40″N 71°04′45″W

Architecture
- Established: 1904 (as a congregation)
- Completed: 1966

Website
- bethisraelmalden.org

Congregation Beth Israel (Hebrew: בית ישראל, lit. 'House of Israel', officially Beth Israel Anshe Litte – "House of Israel, people of Lithuania"), is an Orthodox Jewish synagogue located at 10 Dexter Street in Malden, Massachusetts, in the United States. It was founded in 1904 by Jewish immigrants from Lithuania.

Facing demographic decline in the early 2000s, the congregation undertook a number of efforts to attract Orthodox Jews to Malden and its synagogue. In 2012 Beth Israel had roughly 100 member families and held services three times daily.

Beth Israel's first (and longest-serving) rabbi was Dov Ber Boruchoff, who served the congregation from 1906 to 1939. Yitzchak Zev Rabinowitz joined as rabbi in 1997.

== History ==
The congregation was founded in 1904 as Beth Israel Anshe Litte ("Children of Lithuania"). Their first home was a former Methodist church on Lombard Court in Malden.

In 1906, Beth Israel hired its first rabbi, Dov Ber Boruchoff, who would stay on for 33 years until his death on Passover in 1939.

Beth Israel's third-longest-serving rabbi, Charles Weinberg, was a national leader in the Orthodox movement. He served as President of the Rabbinical Council of America, one of the world's largest organizations of Orthodox rabbis, from 1960 to 1962.

In 1993, the synagogue was targeted by a neo-Nazi group calling itself the Aryan War Council who threatened adverse consequences if an investigation into a recent desecration of a nearby Jewish cemetery was continued. In 1997, Yitchak Zev Rabinowitz joined as rabbi, and is now its second-longest serving rabbi. Before joining Beth Israel, Rabinowitz had studied at the Talmudical Yeshiva of Philadelphia, the Beth Medrash Govoha in Lakewood, New Jersey, the Mir Yeshiva in Jerusalem, and had spent five years at the Kollel of Greater Boston.

Beginning around 2000, Beth Israel began a unique effort to reverse the demographic decline in what had once been a thriving Orthodox community in Malden, receiving national attention for offering low-interest loans to Orthodox families wishing to move to Malden and join the synagogue. In 2005 the congregation intensified these efforts, advertising the loan opportunities in national publications, and creating Malden's eruv. The synagogue also offered scholarships for students to attend religious schools. The congregation's financial capability to make such offers was credited in part to a sizeable "investment portfolio" derived from a donation of stock by congregant Morton Ruderman, a cofounder of the software company Medical Information Technology, Inc. (MEDITECH). In 2011 the synagogue began construction of a new mikveh intended for the use by women within the Greater Boston Jewish community. It has since been completed and is currently in use.

In 2012, Beth Israel had roughly 100 member families and held services three times daily. As of 2025, the rabbi was Yitzchak Zev Rabinowitz.

== Notable congregants ==
Singer-songwriter Norman Greenbaum, who wrote and performed the 1969 rock-gospel hit song "Spirit in the Sky", attended Beth Israel as a child.

== Rabbinical leadership ==
!Ordinal	Name	Term start	Term end	Time in office	Notes
1	Dov Ber Boruchoff	1906	1939	32–33 years	
2	Jacob Lifshitz	1939	1948	8–9 years	
3	Charles Weinberg	1949	1976	26–27 years	
4	Harold Rabinowitz	1976	1980	3–4 years	
5	Michoel Geller	1981	1997	15–16 years	
6	Yitzchak Zev Rabinowitz	1997	incumbent	28–29 years	
