= Back Home Again (Norman Greenbaum album) =

Studio album by Norman Greenbaum
- Released: June 1970
- Genre: Rock
- Length: 34:05
- Label: Reprise
- Producer: Erik Jacobsen

Norman Greenbaum chronology
Spirit in the Sky (1969)	Back Home Again (1970)	Petaluma (1972)

Singles from Back Home Again
- 1. "Canned Ham" Released: 1970; 2. "I.J. Foxx" Released: 1970; 3. "Lucile Got Stealed" Released: 1970 (France)

Back Home Again is the second solo album by the American rock musician Norman Greenbaum. It is the follow up to his 1969 album Spirit in the Sky.

== Reception ==
Professional ratings
Review scores
Source	Rating
AllMusic	3/5 stars
The Encyclopedia of Popular Music	1/5 stars

In a Record World review, the writers note "Hometown and family virtues extolled in deceptively simple music" noting "The instrumentation and the chanting is without polish but with plenty of warm feelings", ending that there is "Something pleasant and homey about this album, like a needlepoint sampler." Billboard magazine stated Greenbaum is "still turning out that good-time rock" on the record. According to Greenbaum, the track "Canned Ham" was controversial, although no reason was given by him for its controversy.

== Track listing ==
All songs written by Norman Greenbaum.

Side one

1. "Back Home Again" – 2:42
2. "Rhode Island Red" – 2:43
3. "Canned Ham" – 2:51
4. "Titfield Thunder" – 5:04
5. "Little Miss Fancy" – 3:15

Side two

1. "Lucile Got Stealed" – 3:54
2. "Circulate" – 3:09
3. "Hook and Ladder" – 2:42
4. "Damper" – 2:56
5. "I.J. Foxx" – 4:19

== Personnel ==
According to the album's liner notes:

- Norman Greenbaum – rhythm guitar, piano, vocals
- Ed Bogas – string arranger
- The Stovall Sisters – backing vocals (A3, B1)
- Jerry Yester – chamberlin
- Bill Douglas – double bass, jug
- Bill Meeker – drums
- Norman Mayell – lead guitar (A4, B1)
- Douglas Killmer – electric bass
- Lynn Elder – Hurdy-gurdy
- Squire – jug
- Russel DaShiell – lead guitar
- Steve Busfield – lead guitar (A1, A2, A4 to B1, B4)
- Dan Paik – mandolin
- John McFee – steel guitar (B2)
- Dan Hicks – washboard
- William Truckaway – Moog synthesizer
