= Boogie rock =

Musical style which came out of the hard heavy blues rock of the late 1960s

- Stylistic origins: Blues rock, boogie-woogie, rock and roll
- Cultural origins: U.S. late 1960s

Boogie rock is a style of blues rock music that developed in the late 1960s. Its key feature is a repetitive driving rhythm, which emphasizes the groove. Although inspired by earlier musical styles such as piano-based boogie-woogie, boogie rock has been described as "heavier" or "harder-edged" in its instrumental approach.

The term has been applied to two styles:

- Blues rock songs that use a repeating monochord riff inspired by John Lee Hooker's 1948 song "Boogie Chillen'"
- Blues rock songs that use a rhythm guitar pattern inspired by early rock and roll songs, such as Chuck Berry's "Johnny B. Goode" and "Roll Over Beethoven"

Boogie rock has also been used to generally describe blues rock performers who emphasize "a back-to-basics approach typified by more simple chord structures and straightforward lyrics" rather than showmanship and instrumental virtuosity.

== John Lee Hooker-style ==
In 1948, American blues artist John Lee Hooker recorded "Boogie Chillen'", an urban electric blues tune derived from early North Mississippi Hill country blues. Musicologist Robert Palmer notes "Hooker wasn't copying piano boogie. He was playing something else—a rocking one-chord ostinato with accents that fell fractionally ahead of the beat." Hooker's "repeated monochord riff" on guitar was adapted by the American rock group Canned Heat for "Fried Hockey Boogie", first released in 1968 on their Boogie with Canned Heat album.

Other artists soon followed, with Norman Greenbaum's "Spirit in the Sky" (1969, Spirit in the Sky) and ZZ Top's "La Grange" (1973, Tres Hombres) being two of the earlier popular songs in the style. The English group Foghat reworked Hooker's boogie for their popular "Slow Ride" (1975, Fool for the City): "they help interject some breath into the riff and help give it more rhythmic propulsion". In the 1980s, it was updated further by Van Halen for "Hot for Teacher" (1984, 1984) and by Joe Satriani in "Satch Boogie" (1987, Surfing with the Alien): "John Lee Hooker may not have recognized the roots of his [Satriani's] pioneering efforts, but it still contains the spirit of the genre, albeit in an exceptionally contemporary vein".

== Early rock and roll-style ==
Early rock and roll incorporated some elements of piano-driven boogie-woogie, which was popular during the 1920s to 1940s. It used a simplified version of the repeating bass patterns, variously termed a boogie shuffle, boogie bass pattern, or boogie riff. The pattern is typically played on two of the bass strings of a rhythm guitar and alternates between the fifth and sixth degrees of a major scale while simultaneously playing the root note of the chord. Chuck Berry's "Johnny B. Goode" and "Roll Over Beethoven" are examples that use such a pattern.

When it follows a typical I—IV—V chord progression, the pattern has been called a "12-bar riff". In the 1970s, the English group Status Quo recorded several songs that "incorporat[e] a boogie/swing/shuffle to contrast with the straight eighths [notes] of rock 'n' roll, and a harder-edged, more serious blues-rock element". These include "Mean Girl" (1971) and "Break the Rules" (1974).

Malcolm Young explained boogie's influence on AC/DC:

The pub scene ... It was like, "Give us a boogie! Give us a boogie!" So everybody played a boogie ... [W]e were always into the blues and the rock 'n' roll stuff. We grew up on it. We had older brothers who were into Chuck Berry and Little Richard and Jerry Lee Lewis, and we grew up as kids hearing that. You know, it's in us. And we just tried to emulate that, these guys, with their feels, and we'd try to get it really rockin' and then keep it going.

== See also ==
Category:Boogie rock albums

== Bibliography ==
- Bennett, Andy (2020). British Progressive Pop 1970–1980. New York City: Bloomsbury Academic. ISBN 978-1-5013-3663-8.
- Birnbaum, Larry (2012). Before Elvis: The Prehistory of Rock 'n' Roll. Lanham, Massachusetts: Scarecrow Press. ISBN 978-0-8108-8629-2.
- Cope, Andrew L. (2019). Status Quo: Mighty Innovators of 70s Rock. New York City: Routledge. ISBN 978-1-351-02590-4.
- Erlewine, Stephen Thomas; Bogdanov, Vladimir; Woodstra, Chris, eds. (2001). "Rock Styles: Boogie Rock". All Music Guide to Rock: The Definitive Guide to Popular Music. San Francisco: Backbeat Books. ISBN 0-87930-627-0.
- Johnson, Chad (2014). Cliff Notes to Guitar Songs. Milwaukee, Wisconsin: Hal Leonard. ISBN 978-1-4584-2127-2.
- Palmer, Robert (1982). Deep Blues. New York City: Penguin Books. ISBN 0-14-006223-8.
- Perone, James E. (2019). Listen to the Blues!: Exploring a Musical Genre. Santa Barbara, California: ABC-CLIO. ISBN 978-1-4408-6614-2.
- Popoff, Martin (2004). The Top 500 Heavy Metal Albums of All Time. ECW Press. ISBN 978-1550226003.
- Rubin, Dave (2015). Inside Rock Guitar. Milwaukee, Wisconsin: Hal Leonard. ISBN 978-1-4950-5639-0.
