= Jack of Kent (disambiguation) =

Jack of Kent, Jack-a-Kent or Jack o' Kent is an English folkloric character based in the Welsh Marches.

It may also refer to:

- I Keep Thinking It's Tuesday, a song by Doctor and the Medics in which this is a key phrase
- the blogging name of David Allen Green, an English lawyer
