= The Eggplant That Ate Chicago =

Single by Dr. West's Medicine Show and Junk Band

from the album The Eggplant That Ate Chicago
- A-side: "The Eggplant That Ate Chicago"
- B-side: "You Can't Fight City Hall Blues"
- Released: 1967
- Genre: Novelty; vaudeville rock
- Length: 2:41
- Songwriter: Norman Greenbaum

"The Eggplant That Ate Chicago" is a song about alien invasion by Dr. West's Medicine Show and Junk Band. Its author, Norman Greenbaum, later wrote and performed "Spirit in the Sky" to greater chart success. It was re released on Dr. Demento Presents: The Greatest Novelty Records of All Time, Volume III: The 1960s in 1985.

In Australia, it appeared on the Festival compilation Operation Big Time! in 1967.

== Parodies and homages ==
- Tom Paxton's "The Pizza That Ate Chicago" on Fun Food Songs (Delta, 1999) and Your Shoes, My Shoes (2002)
- "The Aubergine That Ate Rangoon" on Hawkwind's Astounding Sounds, Amazing Music, 1976
- Big Maybelle recorded the song on America's Queen Mother of Soul, 1966

Although not strictly following the [foodstuff] that ate [place] formula, there has also been:

- "The Cockroach That Ate Cincinnati" by Rose and the Arrangement in 1974 and, arguably its homage,
- "Cicada That Ate Five Dock" by Outline, 1981

== See also ==
- Attack of the Killer Tomatoes
- The Cockroach that Ate Cincinnati
