= Peggy Spencer =

British ballroom dancer and choreographer

- Born: Margaret Ann Hull; 24 July 1920
- Died: 25 May 2016 (aged 95)
- Occupations: British professional ballroom dancer; choreographer; competition adjudicator; organiser

Margaret Ann Spencer MBE (née Hull; 24 September 1920 – 25 May 2016) was a British professional ballroom dancer, choreographer, competition adjudicator, and organiser.

Peggy married Jack Spencer in 1940, and had two children, Helena and Michael. The marriage ended in divorce in 1947. Peggy formed a close relationship with her brother-in-law Frank, whom she eventually married in the late 1960s.

For many years, she and Frank (a musician and a dancer before the Second World War) ran the Royston Ballroom in Penge, South London. Peggy was a regular TV dance commentator. She was a leading coach for competitive Latin dancers, and was influential in both Ballroom and Latin American branches of the ISTD. Her ballroom formation team was twice invited to dance for Queen Elizabeth II at Buckingham Palace. For 40 years, her teams appeared in the Come Dancing TV programme.

Peggy choreographed a dance sequence for a Beatles video ("Your Mother Should Know"), and the tango for Rudolph Nureyev in the film Valentino (1977). She was a choreographer for the Burn the Floor dance show, which combined ballroom dances with modern ideas. More than most things she enjoyed appearing on the BBC's children's show Blue Peter, where she brought young dancers from her classes to demonstrate. She was the subject of the TV show This Is Your Life in 1993.

In 2004, Spencer became President of the Imperial Society of Teachers of Dancing. She received multiple awards for her work in teaching and adjudicating in ballroom dancing, including eight Carl Alan Awards. Both she and Frank were appointed MBE in 1977.
