= Sopwith Camel (band) =

American rock band

Sopwith Camel was an American psychedelic pop band associated with the San Francisco scene of the mid-1960s.

== Career ==
Sopwith Camel, named after the WW1 British fighter plane by founding member Peter Kraemer, formed in late 1965, with a line-up consisting of vocalist and saxophone player Peter Kraemer, guitarists Terry MacNeil (name changed to Nandi Devam in 1979) and William "Truckaway" Sievers, bassist Martin Beard (born 1947, London), and drummer Norman Mayell. Sopwith Camel is best known for being the second San Francisco band to get a recording contract with a national record label, and the first to have a Top 40 hit.

Sopwith Camel's first album (and only album recording during the 1960s), the eponymous Sopwith Camel, was released in 1967 on the Kama Sutra Records label. The single "Hello, Hello", released in November 1966, became the first hit to emerge from the San Francisco rock scene. It reached No. 26 on the US Billboard Hot 100 chart in January 1967 and No. 9 on the Canadian RPM magazine chart in February. A second hit, "Postcard from Jamaica", peaked at No. 88 on the Billboard Hot 100 and No. 82 in Canada in April 1967. Some songs on the band's first album, the vaudevillian "Hello, Hello" in particular, were more reminiscent of earlier songs by the Lovin' Spoonful than of most other San Francisco psychedelic rock of the time; Erik Jacobsen produced both Sopwith Camel and the Lovin' Spoonful. On the other hand, "Frantic Desolation" was chosen by Jon Savage as one of "The Psychedelic 100", an annotated list first published as a booklet by Mojo Magazine and reprinted in the book I Want to Take You Higher: The Psychedelic Era 1965–1969 (an accompaniment to an exhibit of the same name), published by The Rock and Roll Hall of Fame and Museum (Chronicle Books, 1997). The band was unable to follow up the success of their first album and hit single and disbanded later in 1967. Sopwith Camel's debut album has been re-released twice: as Frantic Desolation in 1986, and as Hello Hello Again in 1990.

The band was defunct by the end of 1967. Beard and Mayell continued for a period in music, as session musicians under the direction of Eric Jacobsen. Both appeared on Norman Greenbaum's hit album Spirit in the Sky (1969). Mayell later joined Blue Cheer, replacing Paul Whaley as drummer.

The group reformed in 1971, with all original members with the exception of Sievers, and recorded their second album, The Miraculous Hump Returns from the Moon released on Warner Bros. Records' Reprise label in 1973. Allmusic gives the album three stars, saying, "Imagine a jazzy John Sebastian who's into Eastern culture and vaudeville. This is pleasant, unambitious hippie groove music for a lazy, sunny afternoon. If you're in that mood, it will take you to a warm, fuzzy place." Reviewing the album in 2014, The Guardian said, "What never fails to amaze me about this record is how it sounds like it was recorded about a week ago... Taking in elements of FM schmaltz, prog-rock, jazz, showtunes, Krautrock and Indian classical music, this is an album that overflows with ideas, but never overwhelms."

The band broke up again in 1974.

British-born bassist Martin Beard, who later became an electronics technician in Silicon Valley, died November 10, 2015, at the age of 68. Norman Mayell died August 14th, 2022 at the age of 80.

== Discography ==
=== Albums ===
- 1967: Sopwith Camel
- 1973: The Miraculous Hump Returns from the Moon

=== Singles ===
- 1966: "Hello, Hello" / "Treadin'"
- 1967: "Postcard from Jamaica" / "Little Orphan Annie"
- 1967: "Saga of the Low Down Let Down" / "The Great Morpheum"
- 1973: "Fazon" / "Sleazy Street"

=== Reissues ===
Sopwith Camel was released as a LP Frantic Desolation (1986) & CD Hello Hello Again in 1990.

After sitting in the Warner Bros. vaults for 30 years, The Miraculous Hump Returns from the Moon, was issued on CD in 2001 by drummer Norm Mayell on Generic Type Records, called, The Millennium Edition. In 2006, a second CD release of The Miraculous Hump Returns from the Moon, also by drummer Norm Mayell on Generic Type Records was called Remastered 2006. This time the original master was discovered in producer Erik Jacobsen's basement.

== See also ==
- San Francisco Sound
- List of psychedelic rock artists

== Sources ==
- The Billboard Book of Top 40 Hits, Joel Whitburn, 2000 (7th ed.)
