= The Miraculous Hump Returns from the Moon =

Studio album by Sopwith Camel
- Released: 1973
- Genre: Psychedelic pop; jazz rock; psychedelic rock; progressive rock
- Producer: Erik Jacobsen

Singles from The Miraculous Hump Returns from the Moon
- 1. "Fazon / Sleazy Street" Released: 1973

The Miraculous Hump Returns from the Moon is a studio album by Sopwith Camel, released in 1973. The album incorporates elements of rock, progressive rock, jazz and krautrock.

== Background ==
The album was the sophomore of San Francisco band Sopwith Camel, who had received minor success with the release of 1967 single Hello, Hello before splitting. Band members Peter Kraemer and Terry MacNeil reformed the band in 1970 to write songs that would become The Miraculous Hump Returns from the Moon. Following release, a live tour of the material ended after a fire destroyed the band's truck and equipment, leading to their disbandment.

== Critical reception ==
Professional ratings
Review scores
Source	Rating
Allmusic	3/5

Billboard recommended the album and described it as a "good, easy-going set...featuring often complicated, exotic instrumentals and intricately arranged harmony vocals".

The album has received positive retrospective reception. Rob Fitzpatrick of The Guardian retrospectively praised the album for sounding contemporary, and its experimental and fusion qualities, highlighting the closing track Brief Synthoponia for merging "an awesome breakbeat, sax and synth squalls and some super-skronk hep-cat dynamism into its fifty-three second lifespan". Describing the album as "highly original" and "one of the most amazing overlooked gems" of its era, Richard Metzger of Dangerous Minds praised the album as "quirky, fun [and] sleazy-sounding". Bill Brewster of the The Quietus described the album as "excellent" and its lead single Fazon as "funky, spacey and far-out".

== Track listing ==
The Miraculous Hump Returns from the Moon track listing
No.	Title	Length
1.	"Fazon"	5:15
2.	"Coke, Suede, and Waterbeds"	3:30
3.	"Dancin' Wizard"	3:01
4.	"Sleazy Street"	5:26
5.	"Orange Peel"	5:32
6.	"Oriental Fantasy"	4:53
7.	"Sneaky Smith"	5:33
8.	"Monkeys on the Moon"	3:12
9.	"Astronaut Food"	3:07
10.	"Brief Synthophonia"	1:00

== Personnel ==
- Peter Kraemer – vocals, saxophone, flute, synthesizer
- Terry MacNeil – piano, guitar
- Norman Mayell – drums, percussion, harmonica, marimba, sitar
- Martin Beard - bass
- Erik Jacobsen – producer
- Sopwith Camel – producer
- Stephen Jarvis – engineer
- Steve Jarvis – engineer
