= Hurriganes =

Finnish rock band

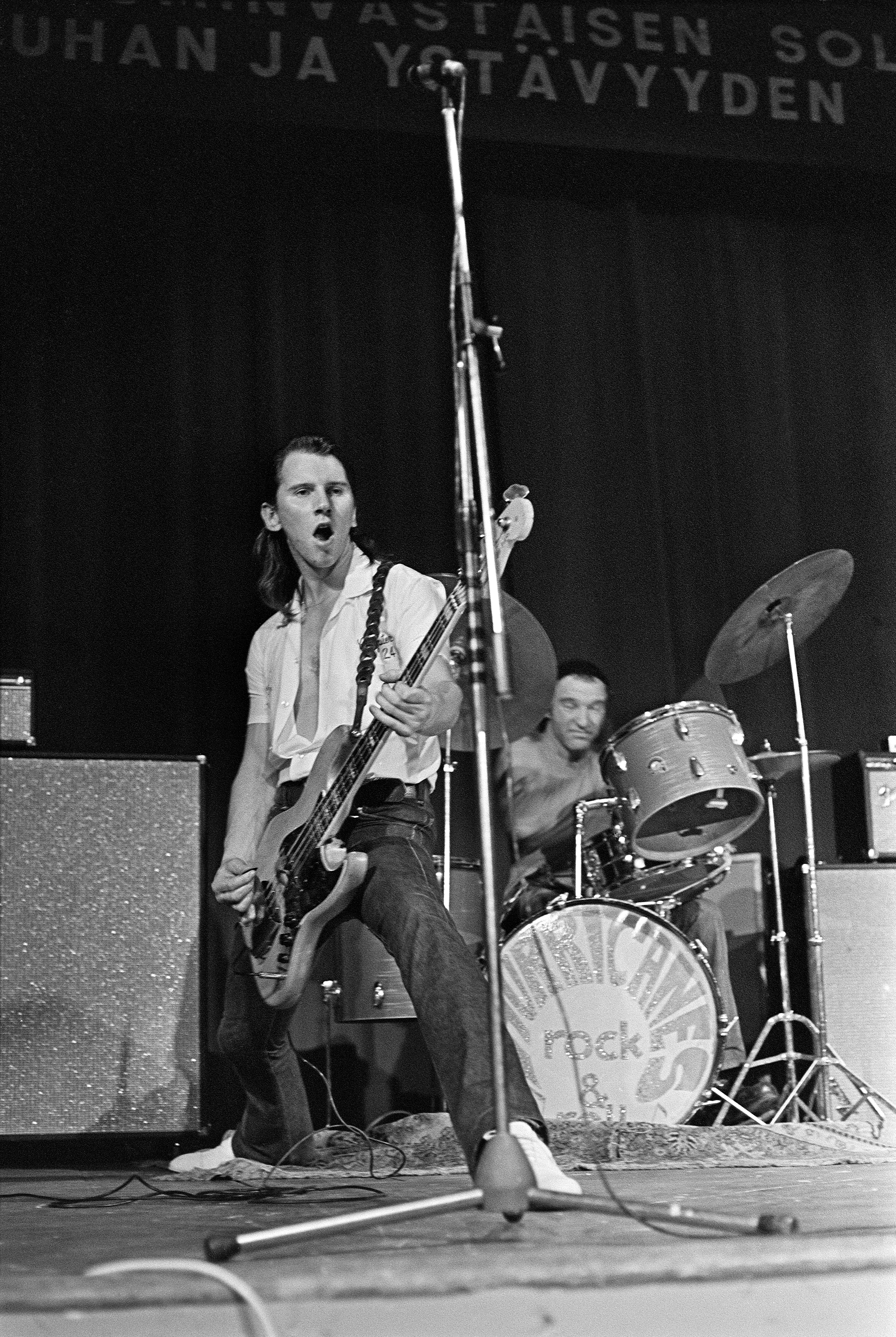
- Hurriganes performing live at the Old Student House in Helsinki, (1973).

Background information
- Origin: Helsinki, Finland
- Genres: Rock, hard rock, blues-rock, rock and roll, rhythm and blues, boogie rock, garage rock
- Years active: 1971–1984; 1988; 1998–2018
- Labels: Love, Sonet, Scandia-Musiikki, Fazer, Warner Music Finland, Svart, Lipposen Levy ja Kasetti, Ainoa Productions
- Past members: Remu Aaltonen; Nipa Niilola; Antti Rautajoki; Jaska Ylä-Rautio; Arska Rautajoki; Ile Kallio; Albert Järvinen; Cisse Häkkinen; Janne Louhivuori; Ola Kyllönen; Beaver Aitto-Oja; Jim Pembroke; Tomi Parkkonen; Pedro Hietanen; Pave Maijanen; Rocka Merilahti; Harri Merilahti; Jukka Orma; Mikko Löytty; Juho Pitkänen; Hike Kärppä

Hurriganes was a Finnish rock band that was formed in the early 1970s. They were very popular in Finland, Sweden and Estonia in the 1970s and early 1980s, as well as a popular live act in Sweden during this time. Their classic line-up consisted of Remu Aaltonen, Albert Järvinen, and Cisse Häkkinen. The misspelling of the name ("Hurriganes" with a "g") is intentional. Their style of music is very much of a nostalgic, pre-Beatles, roots rock'n'roll orientation. During their "classic" period, the band's output consisted largely of revved-up cover versions of well-known 1950s rock 'n' roll songs, in addition to their own original material. In this sense, Hurriganes can be viewed as Finland's answer to British pub rock performers of the 1970s like Dave Edmunds and Dr. Feelgood.

The founding members were drummer and vocalist Henry "Remu" Aaltonen, bassist Hugo Christer "Cisse" Häkkinen and guitarist Ilkka "Ile" Kallio. Kallio temporarily quit the band in the spring of 1972, being replaced by guitarist Pekka "Albert" Järvinen who was part of the band's most famous line-up.

== Career ==
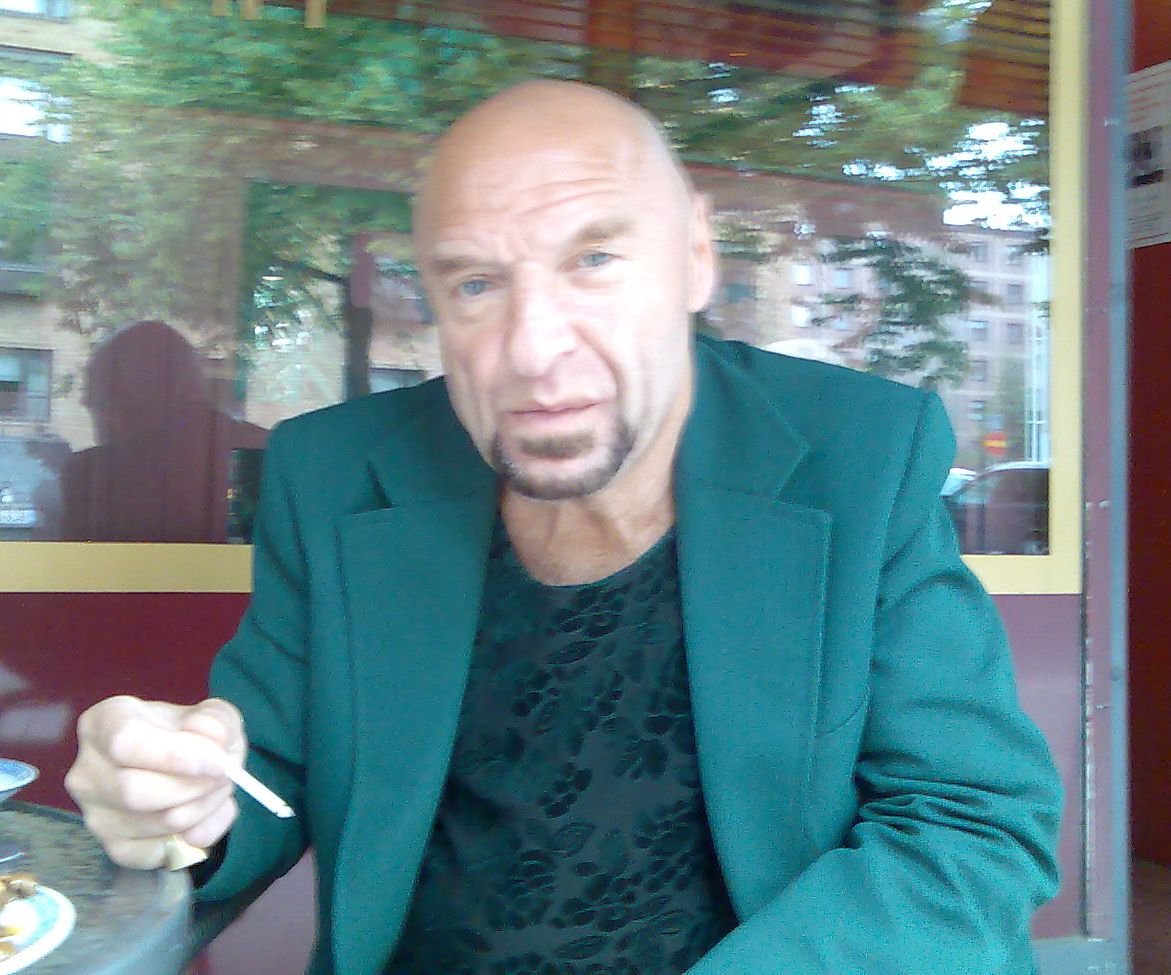
Remu Aaltonen 2007.

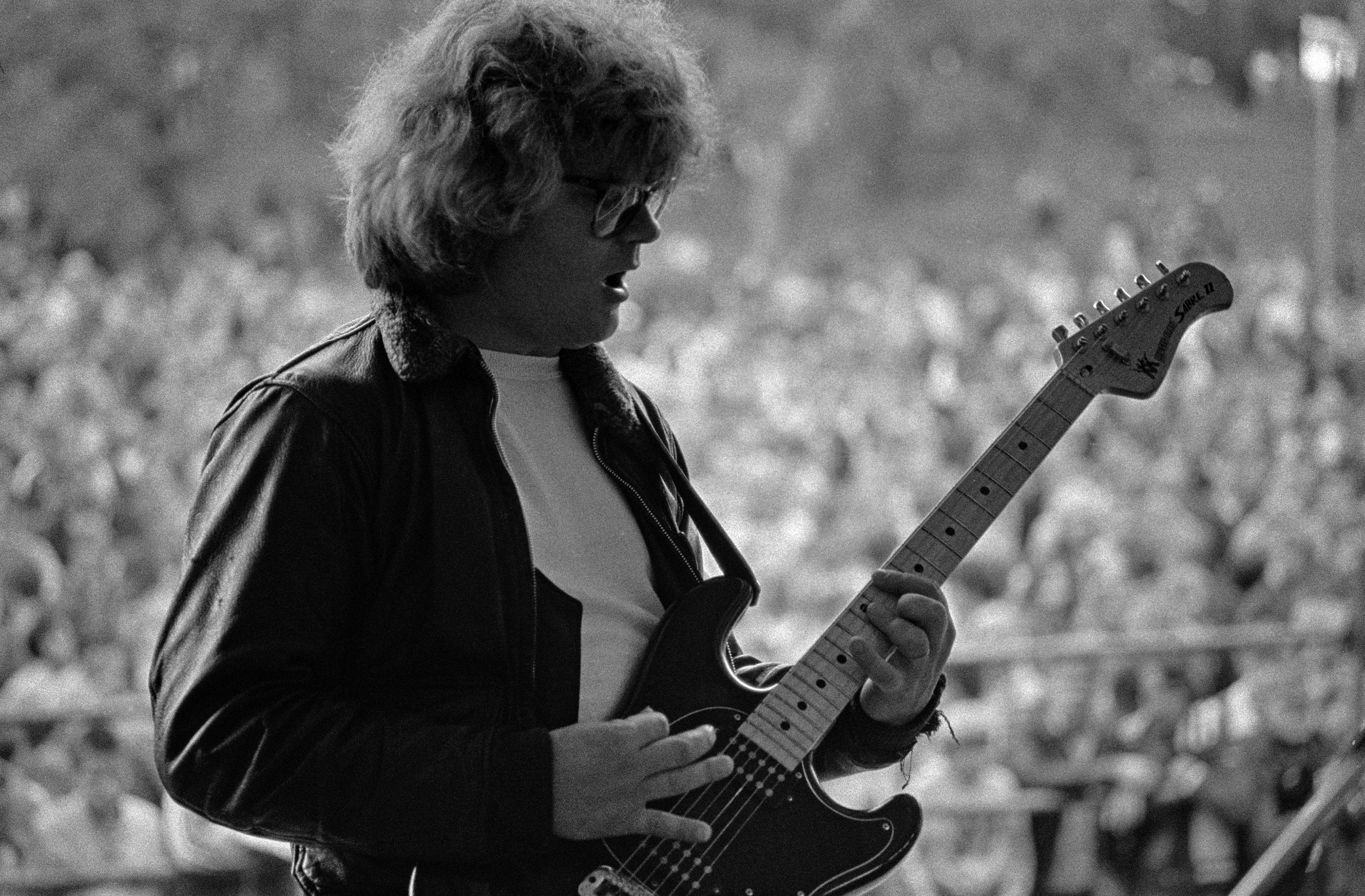
Albert Järvinen.

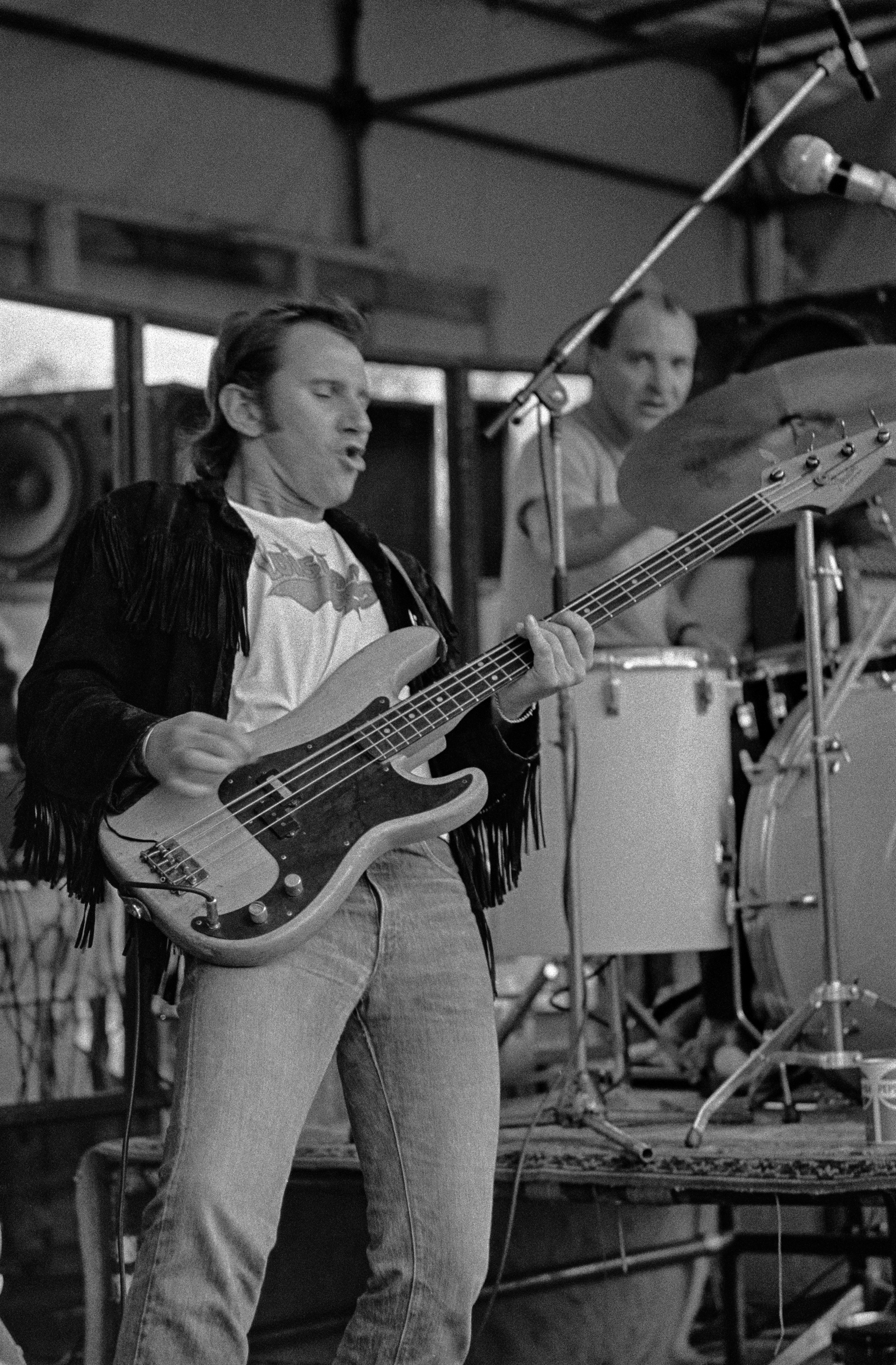
Cisse Häkkinen.

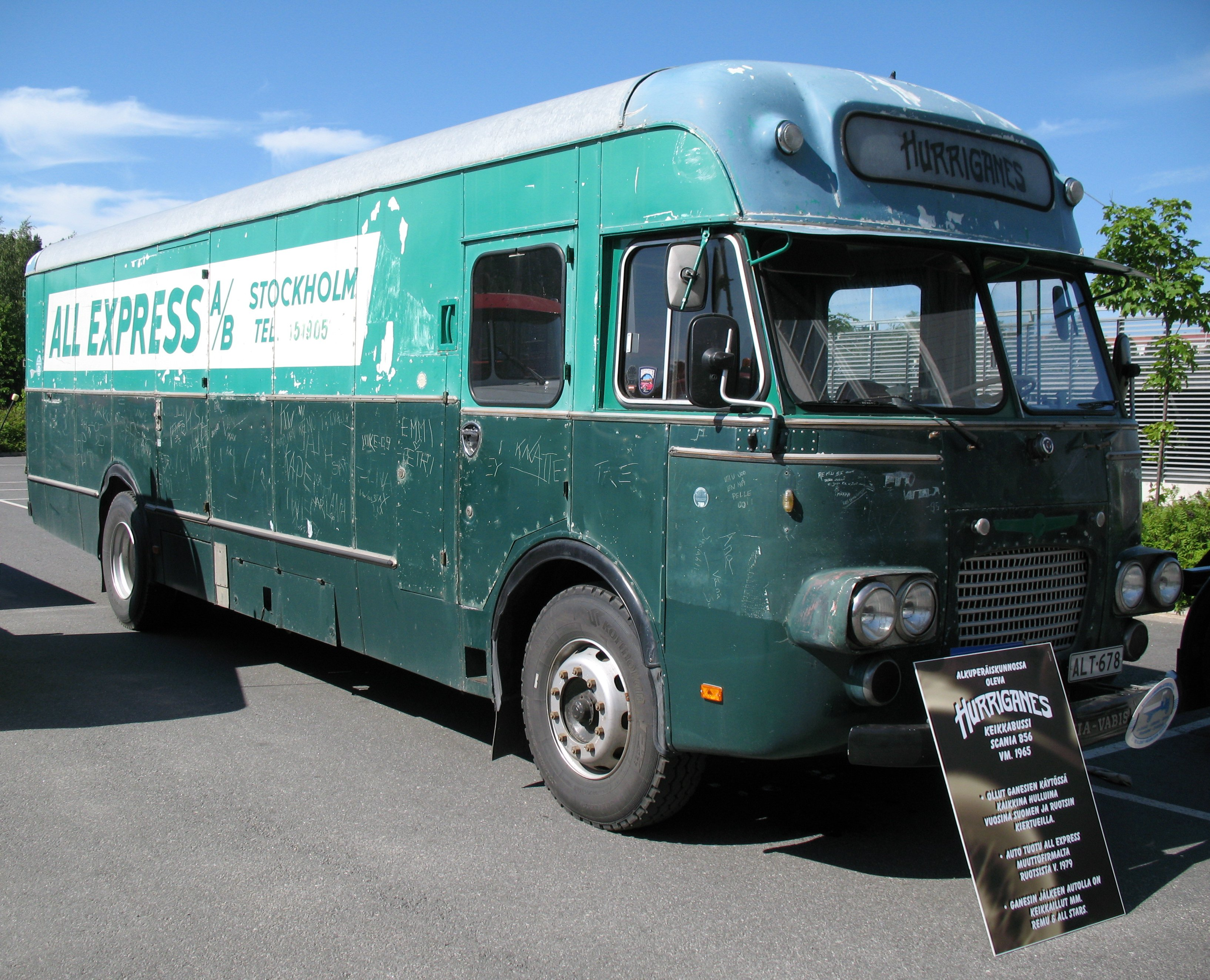
The Hurriganes tour bus, Scania Vabis B56.

=== Early years ===
Hurriganes was founded in 1971 in Pohjois-Haaga, Helsinki, where a similar rock band Jig-Saw played. Influenced by the name of the North American band Johnny And The Hurricanes, Remu Aaltonen devised the name for his own band. Hurriganes practiced in a garage in Ohjaajantie.

=== Rock and Roll All Night Long (1972–1973) ===
Hurriganes' first album Rock and Roll All Night Long was released in 1973. It included songs such as "Say Mama" and "Keep On Knocking". The album's A-side was recorded in a concert in Klaukkala, as was the first song of the B-side, but the rest was recorded in the studio. The album became the first gold record album for the record label Love Records.

=== Roadrunner (1974) ===
Hurriganes' commercial high point was with the release of Roadrunner in 1974. The album included the band's most famous song "Get On", which won the International European Pop Jury competition. The album also included the songs "Roadrunner," "It Ain't What You Do", "I Will Stay" and "The Phone Rang". Roadrunner was recorded in Stockholm at Marcus Music Studios, and the album was also mastered in Stockholm. Roadrunner is still considered one of Finnish rock music's most important albums, and it is Finland's seventh-best-selling album of all time. It was Finland's best-selling album by a Finnish band from 1974 until 1985, when Dingo's Kerjäläisten valtakunta exceeded the volume of sales. The album's cover art (by Risto Vuorimies) was the only Finnish album cover in a 1977 book Album Cover Album (Dragons, World Book) which was compiled by Hipgnosis and Roger Dean. The cover's stylish motif was chosen by Hurriganes' bassist Cisse Häkkinen, who owned a light blue 1954 Cadillac Series 62 sedan. The cover shows Remu Aaltonen, Cisse Häkkinen and Albert Järvinen sitting on the back seat of the Cadillac. In 2007, Roadrunner was re-released as a SACD mixed to a 5.1 format.

=== Crazy Days: Kallio returns (1975) ===
Järvinen left the band in the summer of 1975, and Ile Kallio returned to the band after a break of three years. After Roadrunner, the band's popularity was at its highest, and not until the late 1970s did new wave and rockabilly genres succeed in prying Hurriganes from their spot as number one on the Finnish band scene, although in Hurriganes' early career Hullujussi also momentarily stole some acclaim. In the neighboring country of Sweden, the band was a popular live performer well into the 1980s, and broke the concert venue Folkpark's record in audience numbers several times. The same in 1975, when Hurriganes released the album Crazy Days, which reached diamond disc status quickly, but never did beat the Roadrunner album in terms of sales. Crazy Days contained one major hit, originally released by Jim & The Beatmakers in 1964: "My Only One", which had long been on Hurriganes's concert repertoire, a song sung by Cisse in a bravura performance until the end. The album also covered the Lennon-McCartney composition "Bad to Me".

=== Hot Wheels (1976) ===
After Crazy Days, Hot Wheels's sound was rawer and heavier than its predecessor. This album differs from its predecessors in that it contains only Remu's and Cisse's names in the writing credits of the band's own songs. Ile also took part in the songwriting but Remu deliberately left his name out of the credits. The album was recorded in Lahti by Pekka Nurmi at Microvox studio, which was a cheap, seedy, and not very classy basement studio. In Sweden, Hot Wheels was a real breakthrough and is considered at least equal in importance to Roadrunner. Familiar songs from the album, such as the title track, "Hot Wheels", was heard in 1976-produced, low-budget film Hot Guys, Hot Wheels. The film does not have any particular plot, but it portrays a boy and a girl who end up on a date at a Hurriganes concert. It also shows Remu, Cisse and Ile jamming and spending their free time, including playing football. The movie was directed by Jussi Itkonen, and it aptly describes life in the 1970s. Hurriganes members played themselves in the movie.

=== Tsugu Way and Hanger (1977–1978) ===
Hurriganes recorded the album Tsugu Way (1977) in Love Records' brand new studio, and there were some technical problems, but the content was familiar Hurriganes with some covers, like the Beatles' "Hold Me Tight". The album was released in Sweden, Germany and the Netherlands with the name of "Use No Hooks". The album sold well enough to become a Gold Record easily, even though the record sales were generally down in Finland due to a recession.

In November 1977, Hurriganes' Swedish Sonet label arranged a small tour for the band in London. It was also agreed that next summer they would play 30 gigs in Europe as Status Quo's opening act. Hurriganes failed to conquer London, however, and also the Quo gigs were canceled when Remu and Cisse quit the tour and went back to Finland. The reason was apparently the fact that the band was unknown in England, and the tour arrangements and the reception reflected that. For example, they were not headlining their most important gigs. Remu states, "I fucked up to the whole system so we went away".

For the time being, Ile Kallio's last Hurriganes album was Hanger, where the drummer Beaver Aittojärvi-Oja performed, and keyboardist Jim Pembroke. Remu's back problems prevented him from playing, and the short-lived five piece Hurriganes went on tour to Sweden, but the reception was a little contradictory. The drummer in the concerts was Tomi Parkkonen.

=== Kallio changed again to Järvinen (1979–1981) ===
After the band had failed to find success in Britain in 1977, Ile Kallio began to lose interest and eventually was replaced by Albert Järvinen in early 1979. Kallio's last recording with the band was the single Shorai Shorai which was not published until after Kallio's departure from the band.

Järvinen's second stint with the band lasted two albums – Jailbird (1979) and 10/80 (1980), the latter of which was a major critical and commercial success, and included the song "Bourbon Street". The album was recorded in Stockholm, ABBA's Polar Studios, and it was produced by Pave Maijanen. The album's first track "Made in Sweden", which Järvinen and Aaltonen's earlier band Kalevala had already played, and the last song "Just For You" are unusual for Hurriganes instrumentals.

=== Louhivuori the new guitarist (1981–1983) ===
Järvinen was dropped from the band in September 1981, due to alcohol-related unreliability. He was replaced by the renowned studio musician Janne Louhivuori. Louhivuori played on two Hurriganes albums – 1981's Fortissimo, and the following year's Rockin' Hurriganes. Both albums sold quite well, and Hurriganes continued to be a big concert draw.

=== Kallio's third stint (1983–1984) ===
Louhivuori left the band in the summer of 1983, and his replacement was Ile Kallio, who played on the band's last studio recordings, the album Seven Days, Seven Nights (1983) and the mini-album Hurrygames (1984). The latter was accompanied by a video release with the same name. The band broke up soon after that.

=== The comeback in 1988 ===
Hurriganes reunited in 1988 with the lineup of Aaltonen, Häkkinen and Järvinen, and the band played a series of live shows in the summer. After only a few concerts, however, Järvinen was replaced once again by Janne Louhivuori, who played guitar on the remaining shows. The last concerts were recorded, and the live album Live at Metropol was released. The band broke up after the live album had been compiled.

=== Häkkinen, Järvinen in memoriam ===
Bassist Cisse Häkkinen died of alcohol-related illnesses on Boxing Day in 1990. In March of the following year, guitarist Albert Järvinen died of heart failure in London. After their deaths, Remu Aaltonen has continued to play Hurriganes' music with many leading Finnish musicians.

=== Live In Stockholm (1996) ===
In 1996, the band released a live album Live In Stockholm 1977. The concert had been recorded on a cassette tape which guitarist Ile Kallio found years later during a move. The album quickly became a gold album in Finland. It had been recorded in the band's Swedish breakthrough concert in theater Jarla. Two concerts were held that night, because the first one had sold out right away.

=== New Hurriganes since 1998 ===
Remu Aaltonen re-introduced the Hurriganes name in 1998 as Remu & Hurriganes. Old members (Ile Kallio, Janne Louhivuori) weren't part of the new line-up, and instead two new members joined the band. They were Harry Merilahti (bass and vocals), and his son, Rocka Merilahti (guitar). In 2001 the trio released an album called 30th Anniversary, which included new versions of old hits and one new song. The composition of the band changed many times, and its members included guitarist Jukka Orma, bassist Mikko Löytty, guitarist Nipa Niilola, guitarist Juho Pitkänen, and bassist Hike Kärppä, among others.

In 2007, the biopic Ganes was released. It was directed by JP Siili. Remu Aaltonen was involved in the making of the film.

== Music and stage presence ==
Hurriganes gained fame from the beginning of a stage presence which wasn't previously experienced in Finland. The band's music was rock and roll. The band's repertoire included a number of versions of originality in 1950 – and the 1960s rock classics, including Little Richard's "Slippin' and Slidin'" and Bo Diddley's "Roadrunner". Stage presence, dress like a playing, everything came full force and enthusiasm. Remu Aaltonen, who replied Cisse Häkkinen style, and made him a 1950s rocker style, sitting in full. Hurriganes member's clothing included: Beavers-brand jeans and denim jackets, leather jackets and boots.

== Hurriganes impact on Finnish rock music ==
Hurriganes is considered to be the first Finnish rock band who also gained commercial success overseas. Many of the later Finnish rock bands acknowledge Hurriganes as Finland's great pioneer in the genre. These include, for example, Hanoi Rocks. Hanoi Rocks guitarist Andy McCoy has said that the 1970s and 1980s had only two real Finnish rock bands: Hurriganes and Hanoi Rocks.

== Members ==
- Henry "Remu" Aaltonen – vocals, drums (1971–1984, 1988, 1998–2018)
- Hugo Christer "Cisse" Häkkinen – bass, vocals (1971–1984, 1988)
- Ilkka "Ile" Kallio – guitars (1971–1972, 1975–1979, 1983–1984)
- Pekka "Albert" Järvinen – guitars (1972–1975, 1979–1981, 1983–1984, 1988)
- Janne Louhivuori – guitars (1981–1983, 1988)

== Discography ==
=== Studio albums ===
- Rock 'n' Roll All Night Long (1973)
- Roadrunner (1974)
- Crazy Days (1975)
- Hot Wheels (1976)
- Tsugu Way (1977)
- Use No Hooks (1978)
- Hanger (1978)
- Jailbird (1979)
- 10/80 (1980)
- Fortissimo (1981)
- Rockin' Hurriganes (1982)
- Seven Days, Seven Nights (1983)
- Hurrygames (1984)
- 30th Anniversary (2001)
- Electric Play (2016)

=== Live albums ===
- Live at Metropol (1988)
- Live in Stockholm 1977 (1996)
- Live in Hamina 1973 (2011)
- Last Call: Live in Helsinki (2019)
- Remu Plays Hurriganes: Live in Mariehamn '93 (2021)
- Hamina and Helsinki All Night Long (2021)
- Making of Hot Wheels (2021)
- Rockin' Live 1982 (2021)
- Live at Tavastia 1974 (2021)

== Filmography ==
- Kuumat kundit (1976)
- Ganes (2007)

== See also ==
- List of best-selling music artists in Finland
