= The Stovall Sisters =

American gospel trio

The Stovall Sisters were an American gospel trio of recording artists consisting of Lillian, Netta, and Joyce Stovall. Definitive works include the album The Stovall Sisters (Reprise Records 1970) which included the funk/soul track “Hang on in There.” They are also the featured background vocalists on the 1969 iconic rock/gospel song “Spirit In The Sky” (recorded by Norman Greenbaum, producer, Erik Jacobsen).

== Biography ==
Born in Kentucky and raised in Indianapolis, Indiana, the Stovall Sisters, now known as Nettie Stovall, Lillian Jackson, and Rejoyce Moss, were three of the family of 22 children of James and Della Stovall, and grew up touring with the family gospel group in the Midwest and the South. Their mother, Della Stovall, started each child singing around the age of two. The first Stovall family singing group was known as the Four Loving Sisters and consisted of the four eldest sisters: Dorothy, Billie, Frances, and Georgia. The group name was later changed to the Valley Wonders. Eventually the younger siblings, Wayne, Nettie, and Lillian, joined, followed by Joyce, Donald, and Jeanie. Prior to joining the Valley Wonders, Wayne, Nettie, Lillian, and Joyce performed in a separate family act known as God's Little Wonders. (A cousin, Evelyn Crosby, also performed with the group for a short time).

In the latter part of the 1950s, the family migrated to Oakland, California, where Lillian, Nettie, and Joyce eventually formed the Stovall Sisters (for a brief period the Stovall Sisters included the family's youngest sister, Jeanie Stovall). The Stovall Sisters performed and recorded songs in the genre that consisted of a gospel/R&B fusion and maintained a successful career as professional studio and touring backup singers for an impressive list of well-known artists that include The Staple Singers, The Caravans, Bobby Womack & The Womack Brothers, Al Green & The Green Brothers, Ray Charles & The Blind Boys, The Harmonizing Four, The Soul Stirrers, The Salem Travelers, The Pilgrim Jubiees and Sylvester, The Davis Sisters and The Highway Q.C's, B. B. King, Big Mama Thornton, Etta James, Jimmy McCracklin, Bobby Bland, Charles Brown, Sugar Pie DeSanto, Earth Wind & Fire, Jackie Wilson, Joe Tex, Joe Simon, Parliament-Funkadelic, Sam Cooke, Cannonball Adley, Creedence Clearwater Revival and Norman Greenbaum. They also toured with Redd Foxx and Demond Wilson of Sanford & Son and briefly performed as The Ikettes with Ike & Tina Turner, 1967.

Eventually, under contract with Warner/Reprise, they recorded their sole gospel/R&B crossover album, The Stovall Sisters (producer, Erik Jacobsen) which featured "Hang On In There".

The Stovall Sisters went on to record unreleased tracks for an album with Earth, Wind & Fire's Philip Bailey and Maurice White but disbanded before its release. After several years of separate and solo projects the sisters reunited in 2007 to continue to perform as the Stovall Sisters in numerous live performances and as studio backup singers, adding their gospel soul/funk signature sound to a new generation of music. The Stovall Sisters currently reside in Oakland.

== Awards ==
West Coast Blues Hall of Fame Inductee 2007, Oakland, California.

== Discography ==
Song Bird Records:

- "The Lord's Prayer"
- "The Twenty Third Psalms"
- "Troubled Heart"
- "God's Gonna Move His Hands" (Lion Publishing Co. Inc.)

Avant Records:

- "Time Is Winding Up" / "I'm Going On With Jesus"

Warner/Reprise:

- 1970 The Stovall Sisters album
