= Pekka Milonoff =

Petr "Pekka" Milonoff
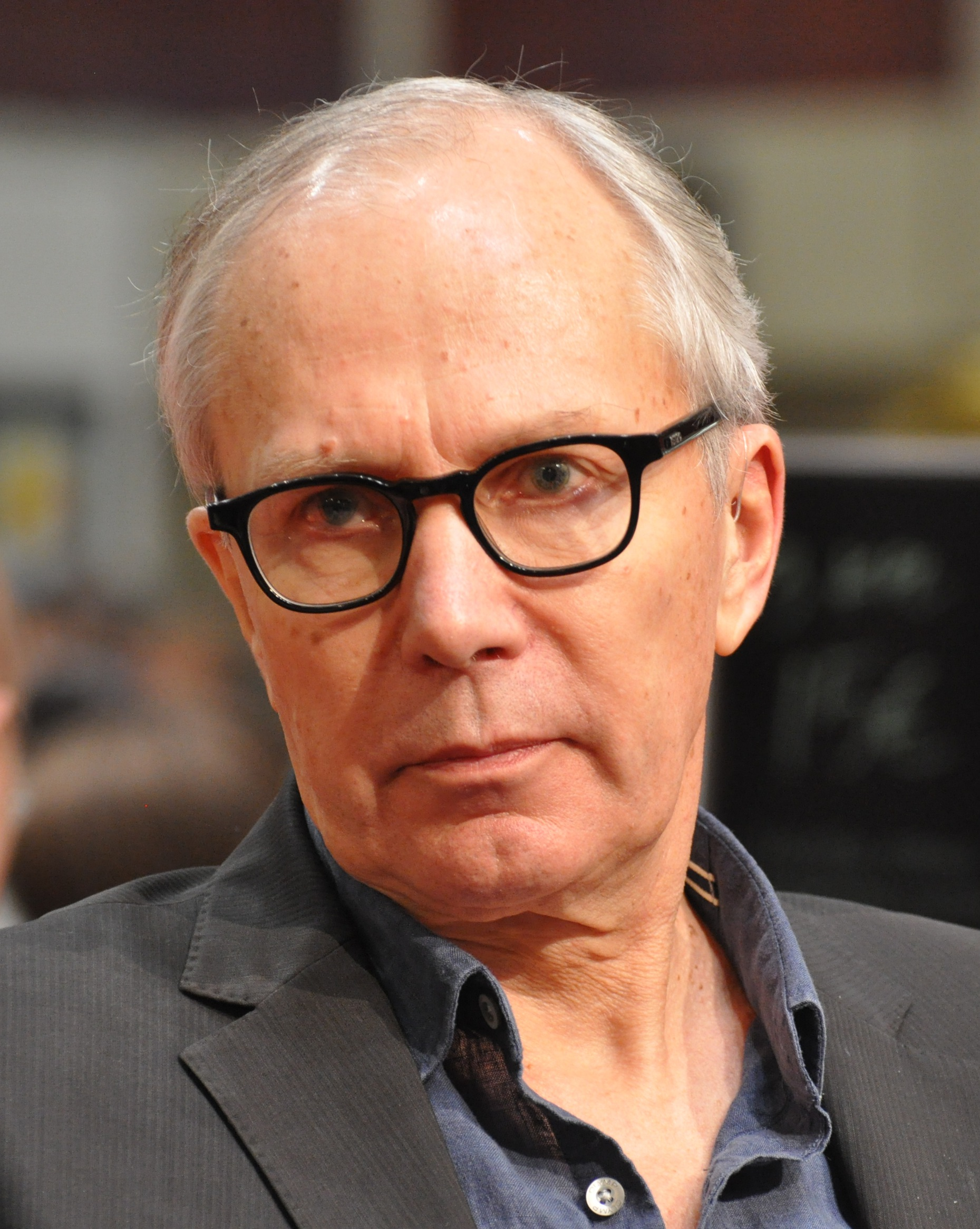
- Born: 22 February 1947 (age 79); Helsinki, Finland
- Citizenship: Finnish
- Occupations: Actor and Director of Theatre and Film
- Children: Juho Milonoff, Eero Milonoff, Tuomas Milonoff

Petr "Pekka" Milonoff (born 22 February 1947 in Helsinki) is a Finnish theatre- and film director and an actor of Russian, German and Swedish ancestry. His sons Juho (born 1974) and Eero (born 1980) are also actors. Juho's twin brother Tuomas works with lights, electricity and filming in TV sets.
