= I Keep Thinking It's Tuesday =

Studio album by Doctor and the Medics
- Released: 28 September 1987
- Recorded: 1987
- Genre: Glam rock, neo-psychedelia
- Label: I.R.S.
- Producer: Doctor and the Medics with Graham Meek

Doctor and the Medics chronology
Laughing at the Pieces (1986)	I Keep Thinking It's Tuesday (1987)	The Adventures of Boadacea and the Beetle (1992)

I Keep Thinking It's Tuesday is the 1987 album by Doctor and the Medics. It was produced by I.R.S. Records.

== UK track listing ==
=== Side One ===
1. "Drive... He Said" – 3:42
2. "Wild Flowers" – 3:46
3. "Gorilla" – 4:06
4. "Jack of Kent" – 3:56
5. "When the Hammer Comes Down" – 3:22
6. "Sea of Stone" – 3:47

All songs written by Doctor/McGuire/Searle/West/Ritchie.

=== Side Two ===
1. "More" – 3:50
2. "Madman of Bernarae" – 3:10
3. "I Keep Thinking It's Tuesday" – 3:03
4. "Love and Everything You Eat" – 3:01
5. "I Wanna Choke on Your Love" – 3:22
6. "Burning Love" * – 3:46

All songs written by Doctor/McGuire/Searle/West/Ritchie, except * written by Dennis Linde

== US track listing ==
=== Side One ===
1. "More" – 3:52
2. "Burning Love" * - 3:06
3. "I Wanna Choke on Your Love" – 3:22
4. "I Keep Thinking It's Tuesday" – 3:03
5. "Waterloo" ** - 3:19

All songs written by Doctor/McGuire/Searle/West/Ritchie, except, * written by Dennis Linde & ** written by Benny Andersson / Stig Anderson / Björn Ulvaeus

=== Side Two ===
1. "Drive He Said…" - 3:35
2. "Wild Flowers" – 3:46
3. "Gorilla" – 4:06
4. "When the Hammer Comes Down" – 3:22
5. "Sea of Stone" – 3:47

All songs written by Doctor/McGuire/Searle/West/Ritchie

== Personnel ==
Doctor and the Medics

- The Doctor (Clive Jackson) – lead vocals
- Steve McGuire – guitar, keyboards
- Richard Searle – bass guitar
- Steve "Vom" Ritchie – drums

with:

- Wendi and Colette Annadin – backing vocals
- Julian Kershaw - brass arrangements
- Davey Payne - saxophone on "Tuesday"

== Singles ==
This album produced two singles, with a supporting music video for "More"

=== "More" ===
- 7-inch UK single: "More" / "Bad Men's Pennies" – IRM139 IRS Records Ltd. (1987)

( Both songs credited to Doctor-McGuire-Searle-West-Ritchie )

- 12-inch UK single: "More" – IRMT139 IRS Records Ltd. (1987)
1. A "More"
2. B "More Again" ( "More ( 7" Mix)")
3. B "Bad Men's Pennies"
4. B "Pretty Little Henry"

( All songs credited to Doctor-McGuire-Searle-West-Ritchie )

=== "Drive he Said…" ===
- 7-inch UK single: "Drive He Said…" / "Ride The Beetle ( Live )" - IRM154 IRS Records Ltd. (1988)

( Both songs credited to Doctor-McGuire-Searle-West-Ritchie )

- 12-inch UK single: "Drive He Said…" - IRMT154 IRS Records Ltd. (1988)
1. A "Drive He Said ( Extended Mix )" – 4:52
2. A "Ride The Beetle ( Live )" – 3:45
3. B "Medics Megahits Megamix" ( "Drive He Said…"/"Burn"/"Spirit In The Sky" * ) - 5:22
4. B "Derive He Said…" - 3:35

( All songs credited to Doctor-McGuire-Searle-West-Ritchie, except, "Spirit In The Sky" by Norman Greenbaum )
