= Over the Fence (2009 film) =

- Directed by: Hamy Ramezan
- Written by: Ilmari Aho, Hamy Ramezan
- Produced by: Cilla Werning
- Starring: Jesse Martin; Emilia Laine; Matleena Kuusniemi; Eero Milonoff
- Cinematography: Arsen Sarkisiants
- Edited by: Joona Louhivuori
- Music by: Pietari Mikkonen
- Production company: For Real Productions
- Release date: 5 September 2009 (Finland)
- Running time: 29 minutes
- Country: Finland
- Language: Finnish

Over the Fence (Finnish: Viikko ennen vappua) is a Finnish short film written by Ilmari Aho and Hamy Ramezan and directed by Hamy Ramezan. The screenplay for the film took part in a scriptwriting competition organized by The Finnish Film Foundation and The Finnish Broadcasting Company YLE in early 2008. Out of 53 submitted screenplays, Over the Fence was selected to be produced. The film was shot in April 2009 with €170,000 budget.

== Festivals ==
Over the Fence won Mention Ada Solomon at 2010 Clermont-Ferrand Short Film Festival and prize for Best International Short Film at 2010 Santiago de Compostela Curtocircuito Short Film Festival. The film was also awarded at 2010 CFC Toronto International Short Film Festival as a Best Live Action Short Film, which made it eligible for Academy Awards.
