= Spirit in the Sky =

1969 song by Norman Greenbaum

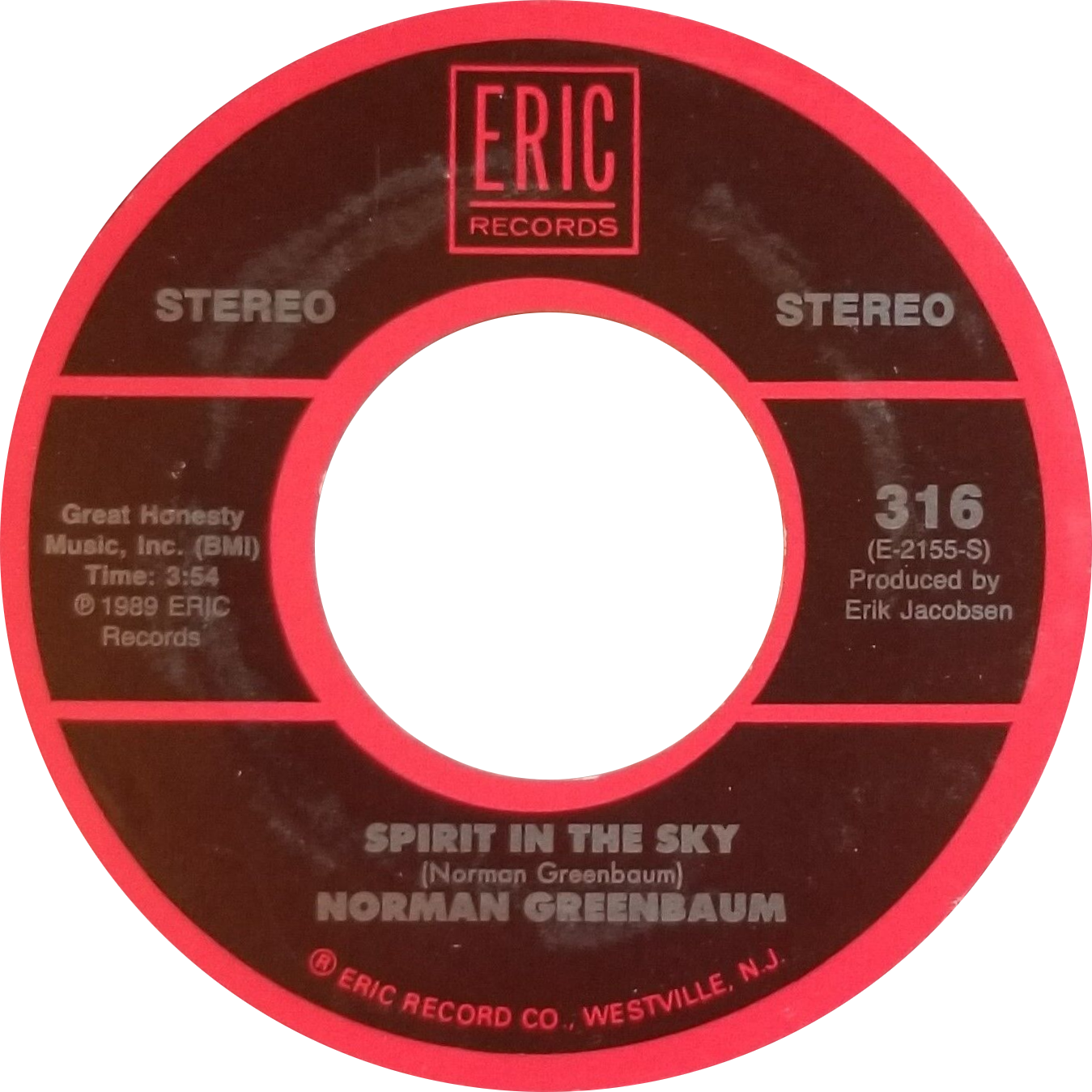

Single by Norman Greenbaum

from the album Spirit in the Sky
- B-side: "Milk Cow"
- Released: December 1969
- Studio: Coast Recorders, San Francisco
- Genre: Boogie rock; psychedelic rock; hard rock; gospel; Christian rock
- Length: 4:02
- Label: Reprise
- Songwriter: Norman Greenbaum
- Producer: Erik Jacobsen

Official audio
- "Spirit in the Sky" on YouTube

"Spirit in the Sky" is a song written and recorded by the American singer-songwriter Norman Greenbaum, and released in December 1969 from his album Spirit in the Sky. The single became a Gold record in the United States, selling two million copies from 1969 to 1970. It reached No. 3 on the US Billboard Hot 100 where it lasted for 15 weeks in the Top 100. Billboard ranked the record as the No. 22 song of 1970. It also climbed to No. 1 on the UK, Australian and Canadian charts in 1970.

Rolling Stone ranked "Spirit in the Sky" No. 333 on its list of the "500 Greatest Songs of All Time". Cover versions by Doctor and the Medics and Gareth Gates have also made the No. 1 spot in the UK. The song was voted one of the top ten one-hit wonders in a Rolling Stone reader's poll.

In 2025, Craft Recordings released the first official music video to the song. Set across Southern California, the coming of age story was directed by filmmaker Laurence Harlan Jacobs and stars Conor Sherry and Abby Ryder Fortson, with a cameo from Greenbaum himself.

== Original version by Norman Greenbaum ==
"Spirit in the Sky" makes several religious references to Jesus, though Greenbaum himself is Jewish. In a 2006 interview with The New York Times, Greenbaum told a reporter he was inspired to write the song after watching Porter Wagoner singing a gospel song on TV. Greenbaum said: "I thought, 'Yeah, I could do that,' knowing nothing about gospel music, so I sat down and wrote my own gospel song. It came easy. I wrote the words in 15 minutes." Greenbaum had previously been a member of Dr. West's Medicine Show and Junk Band, a jug band that performed psychedelic music. When they split up, he won a solo contract with producer Erik Jacobsen for Reprise Records. Jacobsen had previously worked with the Lovin' Spoonful.

Greenbaum first arranged the song for an acoustic jug band; then he tried a folk version and then a Delta blues style, but none of these were satisfactory. Under Jacobsen's direction, the song started to gel at Coast Recorders studio on Bush Street in San Francisco, with Jacobsen's chosen session players Russell DaShiell on guitar, Doug Killmer from the band Crowfoot on bass, and drummer Norman Mayell from the band Sopwith Camel. Greenbaum used a Fender Telecaster guitar with a fuzz-tone circuit built into the body to generate the song's characteristic guitar sound. Jacobsen finally brought in the Stovall Sisters (Joyce, Lillian, and Netta) from Oakland to support the song with gospel hand percussion and vocal stylings, joined by additional singers.

The resulting sound was an "oddly good and compelling" combination of boogie rock (of which genre the song is considered one of the first examples), blues, gospel and hard rock music, with loud drums, distorted electric guitar, clapping hands, and tambourines. Because of the song's length and lyrics, the record company was initially reluctant to issue it, but it was finally released as a single after two other singles from the album had poor sales. "Spirit in the Sky" became a worldwide hit and was the best-selling single for the Reprise label.

== Reception ==
John Lennon stated that he liked the song in his famous 1970 Lennon Remembers interview for Rolling Stone. Music historian Simon Reynolds has referred to the sound of "Spirit in the Sky" as "proto-glam".

The song received criticism from some Christians for including the lines, "Never been a sinner/I've never sinned/I got a friend in Jesus", as most Christian views on sin state that "there is no one who has never sinned". Greenbaum had explained that because he was not a Christian, he had been unaware of that when he wrote the song. In an interview with American Songwriter, he said, "I did flub it I guess, cause if I was a Christian and was writing from that mindset, I would have said, 'I've been a sinner' .... But since I didn't have that upbringing, it never occurred to me that it was wrong." While some Christian artists have recorded the song using Greenbaum's original lyrics, others have changed those lines, such as DC Talk, who instead sang, "You know I've been a sinner/We've all sinned".

Later albums and singles by Greenbaum were not embraced by the market. Greenbaum had abandoned his music career by the 1980s and worked as a sous-chef and restaurant kitchen manager.

== Use in popular culture ==
The song was reworked by Doctor and the Medics in June 1986, achieving chart success in the UK. This cover version was heard in the 1987 film Maid to Order, catalyzing renewed media interest in the original song. The original version is heard in the films Miami Blues (1990), Wayne's World 2 (1993), Apollo 13 (1995), Remember the Titans (2000), Ocean's Eleven (2001), The Sandlot 2 (2005), Katie and Orbie, Lovelace (2013), Guardians of the Galaxy (2014), Suicide Squad, and The Founder (2016). Kellogg's cereal tapped the song for a television advertisement in 1997, and it was the highlight of a lengthy television commercial for Nike shoes in 2005. Greenbaum reflected on the song in 2011, saying, "It sounds as fresh today as when it was recorded. I've gotten letters from funeral directors telling me that it's their second-most-requested song to play at memorial services, next to 'Danny Boy'."

== Charts ==
=== Weekly charts ===
Chart (1970)	Peak position
Argentina (CAPIF)	3
Australia (Kent Music Report)	1
Austria (Ö3 Austria Top 40)	4
Belgium (Ultratop 50 Flanders)	2
Canada Top Singles (RPM)	1
Ireland (IRMA)	1
Netherlands (Dutch Top 40)	4
Netherlands (Single Top 100)	3
Norway (VG-lista)	2
Switzerland (Schweizer Hitparade)	4
UK Singles (Official Charts)	1
US Billboard Hot 100	3
US Cash Box Top 100	1
West Germany (GfK)	1

Chart (2021–2022)	Peak position
Canada Digital Song Sales (Billboard)	8
US Digital Song Sales (Billboard)	14
US Hot Rock & Alternative Songs (Billboard)	21

=== Year-end charts ===
Chart (1970)	Rank
Australia (Kent Music Report)	4
Canada Top Singles (RPM)	19
US Billboard Hot 100	22
US Cash Box Top 100	1

== Certifications ==
Region	Certification	Certified units/sales
New Zealand (RMNZ)	3× Platinum	90,000^{‡}
United Kingdom (BPI)	Platinum	600,000^{‡}
United States (RIAA)	2× Platinum	2,000,000^{‡}
^{‡} Sales+streaming figures based on certification alone.

== Doctor and the Medics version ==
"Spirit in the Sky"

Single by Doctor and the Medics

from the album Laughing at the Pieces
- B-side: "Laughing at the Pieces"
- Released: April 28, 1986
- Genre: Glam rock; neo-psychedelia; new wave
- Length: 3:28
- Label: I.R.S.
- Songwriter: Norman Greenbaum
- Producer: Craig Leon assisted by Cassell Webb

Doctor and the Medics singles chronology
"The Miracle of the Age" (1985)	"Spirit in the Sky" (1986)	"Burn" (1986)

In June 1986, Doctor and the Medics reached No. 1 on the UK Singles Chart with their version of "Spirit in the Sky", spending three weeks at the top. In New Zealand, the song reached No. 2 on the RIANZ Singles Chart, while in Canada, it peaked at No. 1 and was the fifth-highest-selling single of 1986 according to RPM magazine. The song has been certified silver by the British Phonographic Industry (BPI) and platinum by the Canadian Recording Industry Association (CRIA).

=== Charts ===
==== Weekly charts ====
Chart (1986)	Peak position
Australia (Kent Music Report)	3
Austria (Ö3 Austria Top 40)	1
Belgium (Ultratop 50 Flanders)	29
Canada Retail Singles (The Record)	1
Canada Top Singles (RPM)	1
Europe (European Hot 100 Singles)	15
Finland (Suomen virallinen lista)	2
Ireland (IRMA)	1
New Zealand (Recorded Music NZ)	2
Sweden (Sverigetopplistan)	16
UK Singles (Official Charts)	1
US Billboard Hot 100	69
US Dance/Disco Club Play (Billboard)	27
West Germany (GfK)	9

==== Year-end charts ====
Chart (1986)	Position
Australia (Kent Music Report)	28
Austria (Ö3 Austria Top 40)	16
Canada Top Singles (RPM)	5
Europe (European Hot 100 Singles)	59
New Zealand (RIANZ)	48
UK Singles (OCC)	15
West Germany (Media Control)	60

=== Certifications ===
Region	Certification	Certified units/sales
Canada (Music Canada)	Platinum	100,000^{^}
United Kingdom (BPI)	Silver	250,000^{^}
^{^} Shipments figures based on certification alone.

== Gareth Gates version ==
"Spirit in the Sky"

Single by Gareth Gates with the Kumars

from the album Go Your Own Way
- B-side: "Dance Again"; "Will You Wait for Me?"
- Released: March 10, 2003
- Recorded: 2003
- Length: 3:29
- Label: 19; S; RCA; BMG
- Songwriter: Norman Greenbaum
- Producer: Steve Mac

Gareth Gates singles chronology
"What My Heart Wants to Say" (2002)	"Spirit in the Sky" (2003)	"Sunshine" (2003)

Music video
- "Spirit in the Sky" on YouTube

"Spirit in the Sky" was the first single from Pop Idol runner-up Gareth Gates's second studio album, Go Your Own Way. The single was released on March 10, 2003, and was the official Comic Relief charity single for 2003. The song features guest vocals from the Kumars. The song peaked at number one on the UK Singles Chart, becoming Gates' fourth number-one single. Gates' version has been certified platinum by the BPI.

=== Track listings ===
UK CD1

1. "Spirit in the Sky" (with the Kumars)
2. "Dance Again"
3. "Spirit in the Sky"
4. "Spirit in the Sky" (video)

UK CD2

1. "Spirit in the Sky" (with the Kumars)
2. "Will You Wait for Me?"
3. Interview with Gareth Gates

UK cassette single

1. "Spirit in the Sky" (with the Kumars)
2. "Dance Again"
3. "Will You Wait for Me?"

UK DVD single

1. "Spirit in the Sky" (video)
2. Making of "Spirit in the Sky" (video)
3. "Dance Again" (video)
4. Interview with the Kumars (video)

=== Charts ===
==== Weekly charts ====
Chart (2003)	Peak position
Austria (Ö3 Austria Top 40)	10
Belgium (Ultratop 50 Flanders)	33
Belgium (Ultratip Bubbling Under Wallonia)	9
Europe (Eurochart Hot 100)	5
Germany (GfK)	13
Hungary (Rádiós Top 40)	3
Ireland (IRMA)	2
Netherlands (Dutch Top 40)	14
Netherlands (Single Top 100)	11
Scottish Singles Sales (Official Charts)	1
Switzerland (Schweizer Hitparade)	30
UK Singles (Official Charts)	1

==== Year-end charts ====
Chart (2003)	Position
Austria (Ö3 Austria Top 40)	67
Germany (Media Control GfK)	74
Ireland (IRMA)	27
Netherlands (Single Top 100)	60
UK Singles (OCC)	2

=== Certifications ===
Region	Certification	Certified units/sales
United Kingdom (BPI)	Platinum	600,000^{^}
^{^} Shipments figures based on certification alone.

== Other versions ==
A version by Dorothy Combs Morrison reached No. 99 on Billboard's Hot 100 in October 1970, and No. 47 in Canada during November of that same year.

== See also ==
- List of one-hit wonders in the United States
