= Dr. West's Medicine Show and Junk Band =

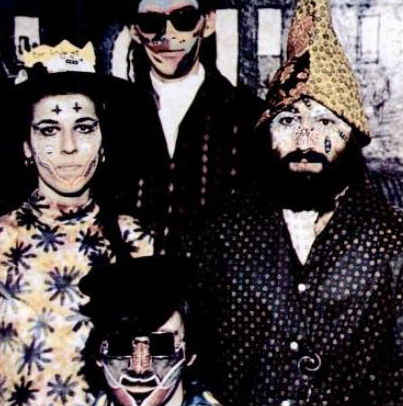
- The group in 1966

Background information
- Genres: Psychedelic rock, folk rock, jug band

Dr. West's Medicine Show and Junk Band was a Los Angeles-based American psychedelic rock band. They were known best for the inclusion of songwriter and vocalist Norman Greenbaum, and for their hit "The Eggplant That Ate Chicago", which reached No. 52 on the Billboard Hot 100 in 1967.

The band members were Greenbaum (vocals), Bonnie Zee Wallach (guitar, vocals), Jack Carrington (guitar, vocals, percussion) and Evan Engber (percussion).

== Discography ==
=== Albums ===
- The Eggplant That Ate Chicago (1967)
- Norman Greenbaum with Dr. West's Medicine Show and Junk Band (1969 compilation)
- Euphoria: The Best of Dr. West's Medicine Show and Junk Band (1998 compilation of The Eggplant That Ate Chicago, all the singles tracks (apart from "Twentieth Century Fox" and "Nancy Whiskey") and eight previously unreleased tracks)

=== Singles ===
- "Gondoliers, Shakespeares, Overseers, Playboys and Bums" / "Daddy I Know" (1967)
- "The Eggplant That Ate Chicago" / "You Can't Fight City Hall Blues" (1967)
- "You Can Fly" / "The Circus Left Town Today" (1967)
- "Jigsaw" / "Bullets LaVerne" (1968)
- "Twentieth Century Fox" / "Nancy Whiskey" (1971)
