= Ile Kallio =

Finnish guitarist and singer (born 1955)

Ilkka Tahvo "Ile" Kallio (born 18 November 1955) is a Finnish guitarist and singer. Kallio was born in Oulu, Finland. He was a founding member of the Hurriganes, then a member of the Finnish band The Dogs. During the 1990s performed as a duo with Kaija Kärkinen.

== Discography ==
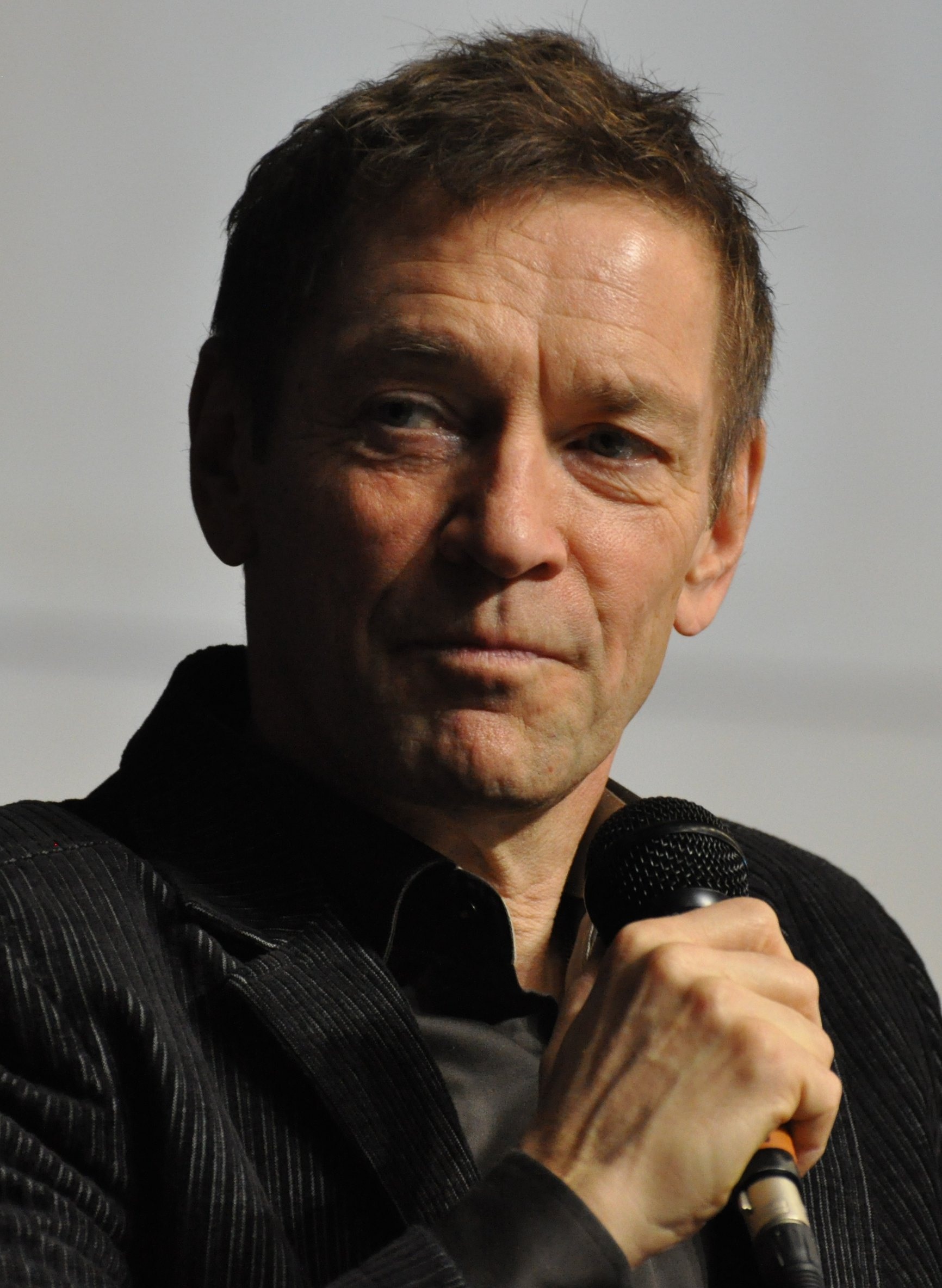
Ile Kallio in 2012

=== Albums ===
As part of Hurriganes

- 1975: Crazy Days
- 1976: Hot Wheels
- 1977: Tsugu Way
- 1978: Hanger
- 1983: Seven Days, Seven Nights
- 1984: Hurrygames
- 1996: Live in Stockholm 1977

As part of The Dogs

- 1979: Dogfood (credited as Pera & The Dogs)
- 1980: Radiator

Solo

- 1977: Irock
- 1980: Get Out
- 1982: Rocks and Stones
- 1986: Tänä yönä

as duo Kaija Kärkinen & Ile Kallio

- 1991: Mustaa vettä
- 1995: Sade
- 1996: Lupaus
- 1997: Suuri salaisuus
- 1999: Noitavoimaa
- 2000: Kaikki oikeudet
- 2002: Kymmenen laulua
- 2004: Kuka saa kyyneleet
- 2005: Sodassa ja rakkaudessa
- 2008: Saman taivaan alla
- 2012: Köyhän naisen paratiisi

As Ile Kallio & Vierailevat Solistit

- 2007: Kirjeitä

As Ile Kallio Big Rock Band

- 2015: Shook Up!
