= Albert Järvinen =

Finnish guitarist

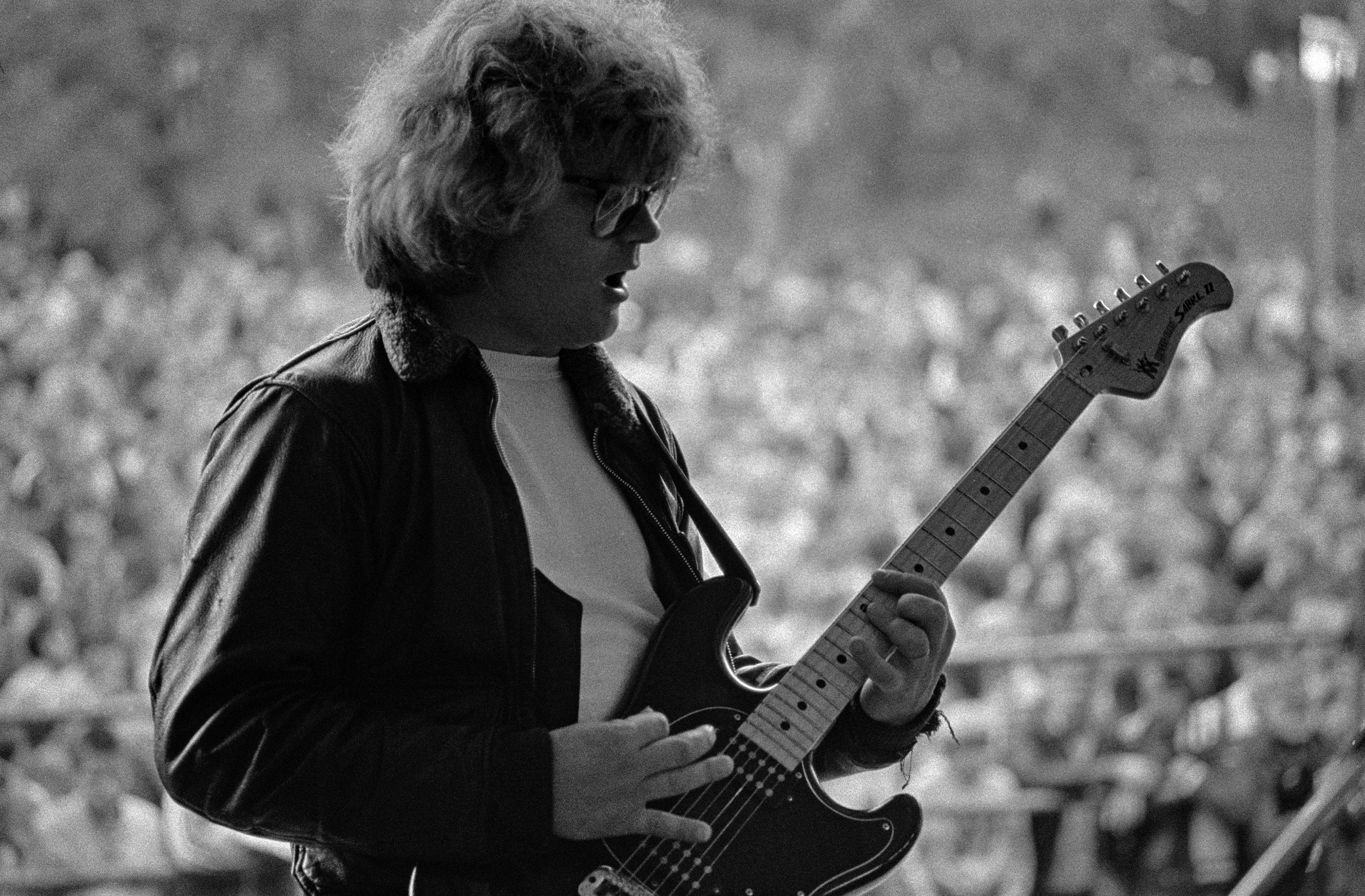
Albert Järvinen in 1980.

Pekka "Albert" Johannes Järvinen (25 October 1950 – 24 March 1991) was a Finnish guitarist. He is best known as the guitarist of the Finnish rock band Hurriganes. He got his stage-name Albert from one of his idols, blues guitarist Albert King.

== Career ==
Pekka "Albert" Järvinen was born in the municipality of Iitti in south-east Finland, where he at the age of eight started playing the acoustic guitar. He initially studied classical guitar under the leadership of Ivan Putilin. Järvinen received his first electric guitar, a Gretsch, in 1965. From there he went on to play in numerous bands, including the blues band Harp and the rock band Poison. When Järvinen, in May 1972, replaced Ile Kallio as the lead guitarist of Hurriganes, he was already a seasoned musician. He had toured with the singer Kristian and been a key member of the band Kalevala.

In 1975 Järvinen left Hurriganes to play with the Finnish musician Rock-Jerry, who was doing a comeback. Rumor had it that Remu Aaltonen had shown Järvinen the door as a result of a drinking problem that was interfering with his stage performance. Later the same year Järvinen would challenge Hurriganes' leadership position by establishing a blues rock band called Royals. Playing e.g. Cream covers as well as their own material, Royals had a more intellectual image. Järvinen would however have to admit, that while he had the talent, he lacked Remu's charisma. Royals would never form a serious challenge to Hurriganes. As this band split in 1979, Järvinen planned to continue his career in England. Elvis Costello among numerous others wanted him as a lead guitarist. This British connection was fueled by Nick Lowe, who had visited Finland to record Järvinen's guitar solos. Järvinen however returned to Finland to play with Dave Lindholm before rejoining Hurriganes in 1979. This engagement would last two years during which the band would record two albums.

In 1981 Järvinen joined Sleepy Sleepers but was sacked due to heavy drinking. Together with Sleepy Sleepers former drummer Harri Lemola Järvinen formed a new band The Quips which stayed together only for a year. In 1984 Järvinen published a maxi-single Countdown under the name of Albert Järvinen Band. The single was produced and also sung by Lemmy Kilmister from the British band Motörhead. In the middle of the 1980s Järvinen kept a low profile perfecting his skills. At the latter half of the decade, he played with various artist and recorded a solo album Braindamage – Or Still Alive together with Albert King and William Clarke.

== Death ==
Järvinen died during a concert trip in London, UK, in the spring of 1991, aged 40. The official cause of death was myocardial infarction. Järvinen is buried in Honkanummi cemetery in Vantaa.

== Partial discography ==
=== Solo albums ===
- Ride On (1974)
- Braindamage – Or Still Alive (1988)
- Guitar (1990) (compilation album)
- Mirror Tower (1991)
- Aspects of Albert Järvinen (1995) (compilation album)
- Patchy Moss – 30 Big Ones (2000) (compilation album)
- Let It Roll: Rocks & Rarities (2004) (compilation album)

=== With Hurriganes ===
- Rock and Roll All Night Long (1973)
- Roadrunner (1974)
- Sixteen Golden Greats (1977) (compilation album)
- Hurrigane by the Hurriganes (1977) (compilation album)
- Jailbird (1979)
- 10/80 (1980)
