= Spirit in the Sky (album) =

Studio album by Norman Greenbaum
- Released: October 10, 1969
- Recorded: 1968–69
- Genre: Rock
- Length: 33:59
- Label: Reprise; Varèse Sarabande (reissue)
- Producer: Erik Jacobsen

Norman Greenbaum chronology
Spirit in the Sky (1969)	Back Home Again (1970)

Professional ratings
Review scores
Source	Rating
AllMusic	4/5 stars
Rolling Stone	(favorable)

Spirit in the Sky is the debut solo album by American singer-songwriter Norman Greenbaum. It contains his popular hit song, the title track "Spirit in the Sky".

Varèse Sarabande released it on CD in 2001, with seven bonus tracks, and on vinyl for Record Store Day, on April 19, 2014. The bonus track "Canned Ham" was included on the follow up for Spirit in the Sky, Back Home Again.

== Track listing ==
All selections written by Norman Greenbaum.

Side 1

1. "Junior Cadillac" – 3:38
2. "Spirit in the Sky" – 4:02
3. "Skyline" – 3:14
4. "Jubilee" – 3:01
5. "Alice Bodine" – 3:42

Side 2

6. "Tars of India" – 3:05
7. "The Power" – 2:38
8. "Good Lookin' Woman" – 4:17
9. "Milk Cow" – 3:04
10. "Marcy" – 3:17

CD bonus tracks

11. "School for Sweet Talk" – 2:57
12. "Children of Paradise" – 2:11
13. "Canned Ham" – 2:53
14. "Save Me for a Rainy Day" – 2:47
15. "Chocolate Milk" – 1:57
16. "Spirit in the Sky" (edit) – 3:02
17. Radio promo – 0:52
