= Remu Aaltonen =

Finnish drummer and singer

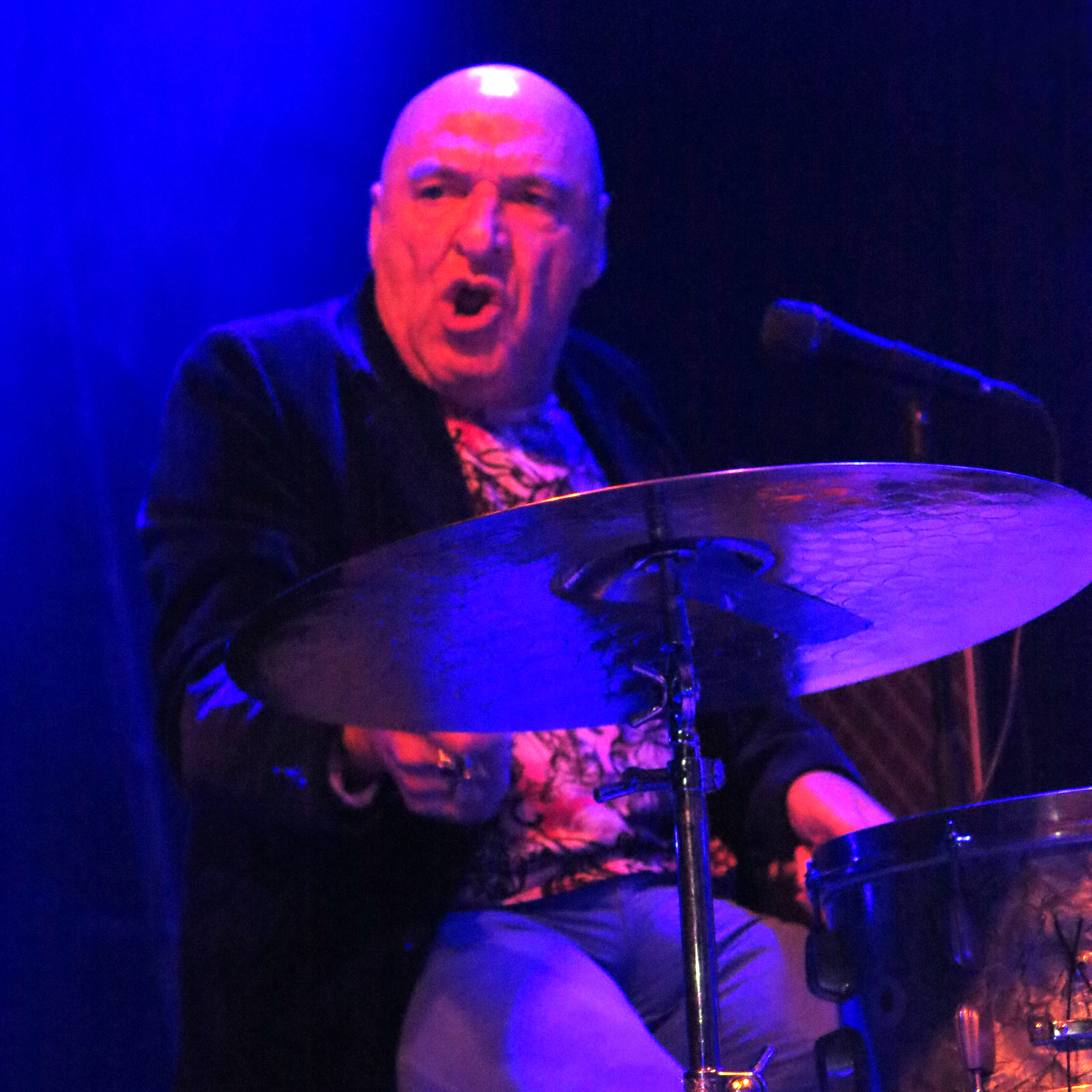
- Remu Aaltonen at Helsinki's Tavastia Club in 2017

Background information
- Born: January 10, 1948 (age 78); Helsinki
- Occupations: singer and drummer
- Instrument: drums
- Years active: 1966-

Henry Olavi "Remu" Aaltonen (born 10 January 1948) is a Finnish drummer and singer. He is the lead musician of the band Hurriganes, but has also pursued a solo singing career.

== Early life ==
Aaltonen was born in Helsinki. He was the oldest child in a family of seven siblings and one foster child. He is of Romani descent. For a while the family lived in an abandoned train car in Ruskeasanta, Vantaa near the construction of the Helsinki Airport. The living conditions of Romani people in Finland only started improving in the 1970s.

The family's father Otto Aaltonen was an alcoholic who was not always around, and the mother Eeva sold moonshine to support them. Aaltonen got his nickname "Remu" in his youth. The nickname most likely comes from the Finnish verb remuta, meaning to make a lot of noise. "The big boys gave me the name when we were playing football. But I was never such a big noisemaker", says Aaltonen.

Aaltonen was 16 years old and already playing in various bands when he received his first prison sentence for burglaries and other property crimes in 1964. He has also received convictions for drug possession.

== Musical career ==
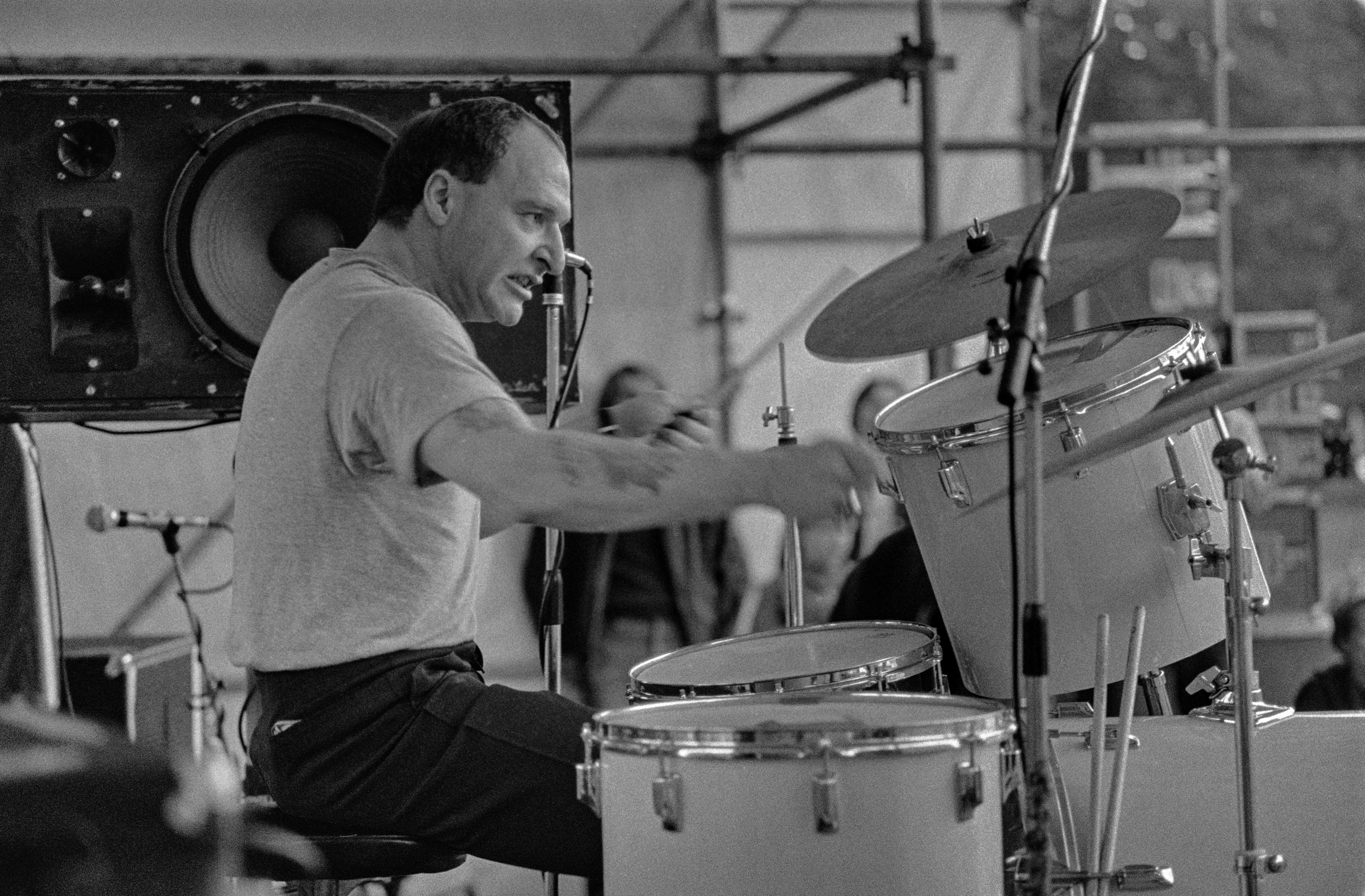
Remu Aaltonen playing drums at a Hurriganes concert in Kaivopuisto, Helsinki in 1980.

Aaltonen was inspired by blues music from the United States already in his youth. Although his formal musical training was limited to music lessons at school, by the early 1970s he had already been playing with various other artists, such as the brothers Kirka and Sammy Babitzin.

After Aaltonen had been fired from his band Kalevala because of a prison sentence, he founded a new band called Hurriganes together with bass player Cisse Häkkinen and guitarist Albert Järvinen. Aaltonen is the only remaining original member of the band.

In 1974, Hurriganes had to pause their tour for a few months while Aaltonen was in prison. Aaltonen has said that his music career saved him from a life of crime.

== Recognition and awards ==
In 2018, Aaltonen was awarded the Suomi-palkinto (Finland Award) by the Finnish Ministry of Education and Culture as a recognition of an impactful career in the field of arts.

== Discography ==
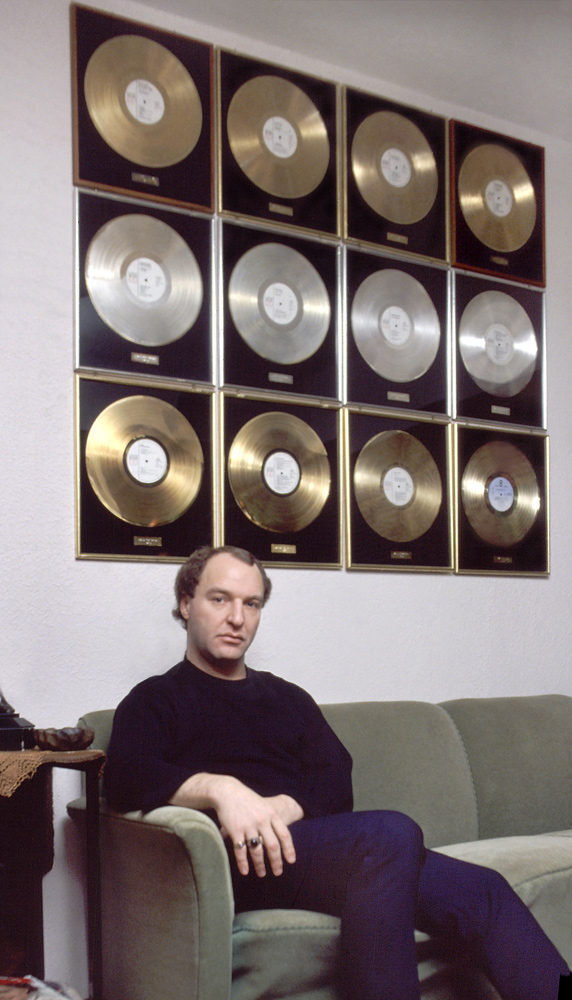
Aaltonen at his home in 1978.

=== Solo albums ===
- No Panic (1978)
- Sound of Hurrigane (1981)
- Zin-Khan (1982))
- Message For You (1983))
- Vilkuilevat silmät (1985, EP)
- Live at Café Metropol (1985, live)
- Viittä vaille kaks (1987)
- Remu plays Hurriganes: Roadrunner Tour (1994)
- In the Spirit of Hurriganes (1995)
- Taikakivi (1999)
- Sticks and Stones (Remu album) (2004)
- Andalusian muistelot (2013)

=== Other albums ===
- Ganes (2007)
- JuiceRemuDave – Live! (2008)
- Remu and His All Stars: Live at Tullikamari (2018)

=== Collections ===
- Parhaat (1987)
- Collection (1990)
- Mad About You (1992)
- Suomen Parhaat – Remu (1994)
- 20 suosikkia – Paholaisen masurkka (1995)
- Remu & Hurriganes: Double Trouble (1997)
- Legendaarinen Remu (2008)
- The Very Best of Remu (2008)

=== Singles ===
- "Paholaisen masurkka" (1986)
- "Planeetta" (2009)

== Bibliography ==
- Aaltonen, Remu (2007) [1984]. Poika varjoiselta kujalta (in Finnish) (3rd ed.). Helsinki: WSOY. ISBN 9789510333006.
- Aaltonen, Remu; Honkanen, Nina (1997). Seitsemän ilon kyyneleet (in Finnish). Helsinki: Otava. ISBN 951-1-14937-7.
- Aaltonen, Remu; Salo, Markku (2016). Remu (in Finnish). Helsinki: Johnny Kniga. ISBN 978-951-040-529-1.
- Annala, Jukka; Aaltonen, Remu (2008). Remusanakirja (in Finnish). Helsinki: Teos. ISBN 978-951-851-156-7.
- Kaila, Kalla; Aaltonen, Remu; Haanpää, Harri (1994). Remu pienellä näyttämöllä (in Finnish). Helsinki: Musta taide. ISBN 9789529851010.
