= Norman Greenbaum =

American singer-songwriter (born 1942)

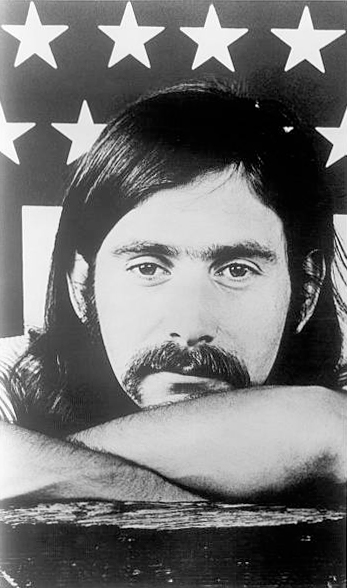
- Greenbaum c. 1969

Background information
- Born: Norman Joel Greenbaum; November 20, 1942 (age 83); Malden, Massachusetts, U.S.
- Genre: Rock
- Occupations: Musician; songwriter
- Instruments: Vocals; guitar
- Years active: 1965–present
- Formerly of: Dr. West's Medicine Show and Junk Band
- Spouse: Victoria Sue Bodnar (m. 1969; div. 1973) (2 children)
- Website: spiritinthesky.com

Norman Joel Greenbaum (born November 20, 1942) is an American singer-songwriter, known for his 1969 hit song "Spirit in the Sky". The song made him one of the most famous acts with a best-selling one-hit wonder of all time.

== Early life and education ==
Greenbaum was born in Malden, Massachusetts, a suburb of Boston. He grew up in an Orthodox Jewish household and attended Hebrew school at Congregation Beth Israel. His initial interest in music was sparked by southern blues music and the folk music which was popular in the late 1950s and early 1960s. He performed with various bands in high school and studied music at Boston University in Boston for two years. In college, he performed at local coffeehouses but eventually dropped out and moved to Los Angeles in 1965.

== Career ==
In the late 1960s, Greenbaum was the leader and composer for Dr. West's Medicine Show and Junk Band, which recorded the novelty hit "The Eggplant That Ate Chicago". The group's psychedelic approach was too eccentric for mainstream show business; the group's name suggested a novelty or comedy act incorporating music.

Norman Greenbaum went solo as a folk artist and submitted an original song, "Spirit in the Sky", to Reprise Records. His demonstration recording was a simple folk rendition, with Greenbaum accompanying himself on acoustic guitar. Reprise sent Greenbaum to staff producer Erik Jacobsen, who radically rearranged the song for a new recording session. The updated version had pulsing electric guitar, gospel-styled backup singers and an insistent rhythm accompanying Greenbaum, whose vocal was now double-tracked. Reprise released the record in late 1969, and it skyrocketed to number one in almost all worldwide markets. It sold two million copies in 1969 and 1970 and received a gold disc from the RIAA. It has been used in many films, advertisements and television shows.

Although "Spirit in the Sky" has a clear Christian theme, Greenbaum is Jewish, having grown up in an observant Orthodox Jewish household, although he no longer practices the religion. He says that he was inspired to write the song after watching a Christian-themed song performed by Porter Wagoner on television. Greenbaum said Western movies were a major inspiration for "Spirit in the Sky":

Norman Greenbaum: If you ask me what I based "Spirit in the Sky" on... what did we grow up watching? Westerns! These mean and nasty varmints get shot and they wanted to die with their boots on... to me that was spiritual, they wanted to die with their boots on.
Ray Shasho: So that was the trigger that got you to write the song?
Greenbaum: Yes. The song itself was simple, when you're writing a song you keep it simple of course. It wasn't like a Christian song of praise it was just a simple song. I had to use Christianity because I had to use something. But more important it wasn't the Jesus part, it was the spirit in the sky. Funny enough... I wanted to die with my boots on.

Without a full band and backup singers for "Spirit in the Sky" as used in the recording studio, it was impractical for Greenbaum to replicate the recording in live performances. A key element to the song was a distinctive alternating diving sound from the lead guitar. Some twenty years later, Eddie Van Halen re-created it by wiring a simple momentary contact switch into his guitar and tapping it while depressing the vibrato arm. As with most other televised performances of the day, Greenbaum's appearance on Dick Clark's American Bandstand compelled the singer to synchronize his performance to a playback of the hit record.

Greenbaum's upbeat "Canned Ham" followed in 1970, and the record reached number 46 on the American charts and number 26 on the Canadian charts. After the release in 1972 of his album Petaluma (named after the city in California where he has lived), Greenbaum left the music business and returned to his dairy farm. He returned to the music industry as a manager and promoter in the mid-1980s.

== Personal life ==
Greenbaum is reported to be a long-time resident of Santa Rosa, California, but in the late 1960s and early 1970s he lived on a farm in neighboring Petaluma, raising goats with his wife. On March 28, 2015, he was seriously injured when a car in which he was a passenger made a left turn in the path of a motorcycle on Occidental Road, killing the motorcyclist and injuring the motorcycle passenger. He was in a coma for nearly a month, and attributes his recovery to his fans praying for his return. Greenbaum was reported performing in 2016. He is also a survivor of prostate cancer and heart attack.

== Discography ==
=== with Dr. West's Medicine Show and Junk Band ===
- The Eggplant That Ate Chicago (1967)
- Norman Greenbaum with Dr. West's Medicine Show and Junk Band (1969, compilation)
- Euphoria: The Best of Dr. West's Medicine Show and Junk Band (1998, compilation; contains the album 'The Eggplant That Ate Chicago', all the band's singles and 8 previously unreleased tracks)

=== Solo ===
==== Studio albums ====
- Spirit in the Sky (1969)
- Back Home Again (1970)
- Petaluma (1972)

==== Compilation albums ====
- Spirit in the Sky: The Best of Norman Greenbaum (1995)
- Spirit in the Sky: The Best of Norman Greenbaum (1997)
- Spirit in the Sky: The Definitive Anthology (2003)

=== Singles ===
Year	Single	Chart positions								Certifications
Year	Single	US	AUS	BEL (WA)	CAN	GER	IRE	NL	UK	Certifications
1966	"The Eggplant That Ate Chicago" (with Dr. West's Medicine Show and Junk Band)	52	—	—	—	—	—	—	—	
1967	"Gondoliers, Shakespeares, Overseers, Playboys and Bums" (with Dr. West's Medicine Show and Junk Band)	—	—	—	—	—	—	—	—	
1967	"You Can Fly" (with Dr. West's Medicine Show and Junk Band)	—	—	—	—	—	—	—	—	
1968	"Bullets la Verne" / "Jigsaw" (with Dr. West's Medicine Show and Junk Band)	—	—	—	—	—	—	—	—	
1968	"School for Sweet Talk" (as Dr. Norman Greenbaum)	—	—	—	—	—	—	—	—	
1969	"Marcy"	—	—	—	—	—	—	—	—	
1969	"Jubilee"	—	—	—	—	—	—	—	—	
1969	"Spirit in the Sky"	3	1	1	1	1	1	3	1	RIAA: 2× Platinum; BPI: Platinum
1970	"Canned Ham"	46	51	—	26	—	—	—	—	
1970	"I.J. Foxx"	—	—	—	—	—	—	—	—	
1970	"Lucille Got Stealed" (France-only release)	—	—	—	—	—	—	—	—	
1971	"California Earthquake"	93	—	—	—	—	—	—	—	
1971	"Twentieth Century Fox" (Dr. West's Medicine Show and Junk Band)	—	—	—	—	—	—	—	—	
1972	"Petaluma" (promo)	—	—	—	—	—	—	—	—	
1974	"Nancy Whiskey" (Dr. West's Medicine Show and Junk Band) (UK-only release)	—	—	—	—	—	—	—	—	
"—" denotes releases that did not chart or were not released in that territory.

== See also ==
- List of 1970s one-hit wonders in the United States
