= Anders Roslund =

Swedish writer

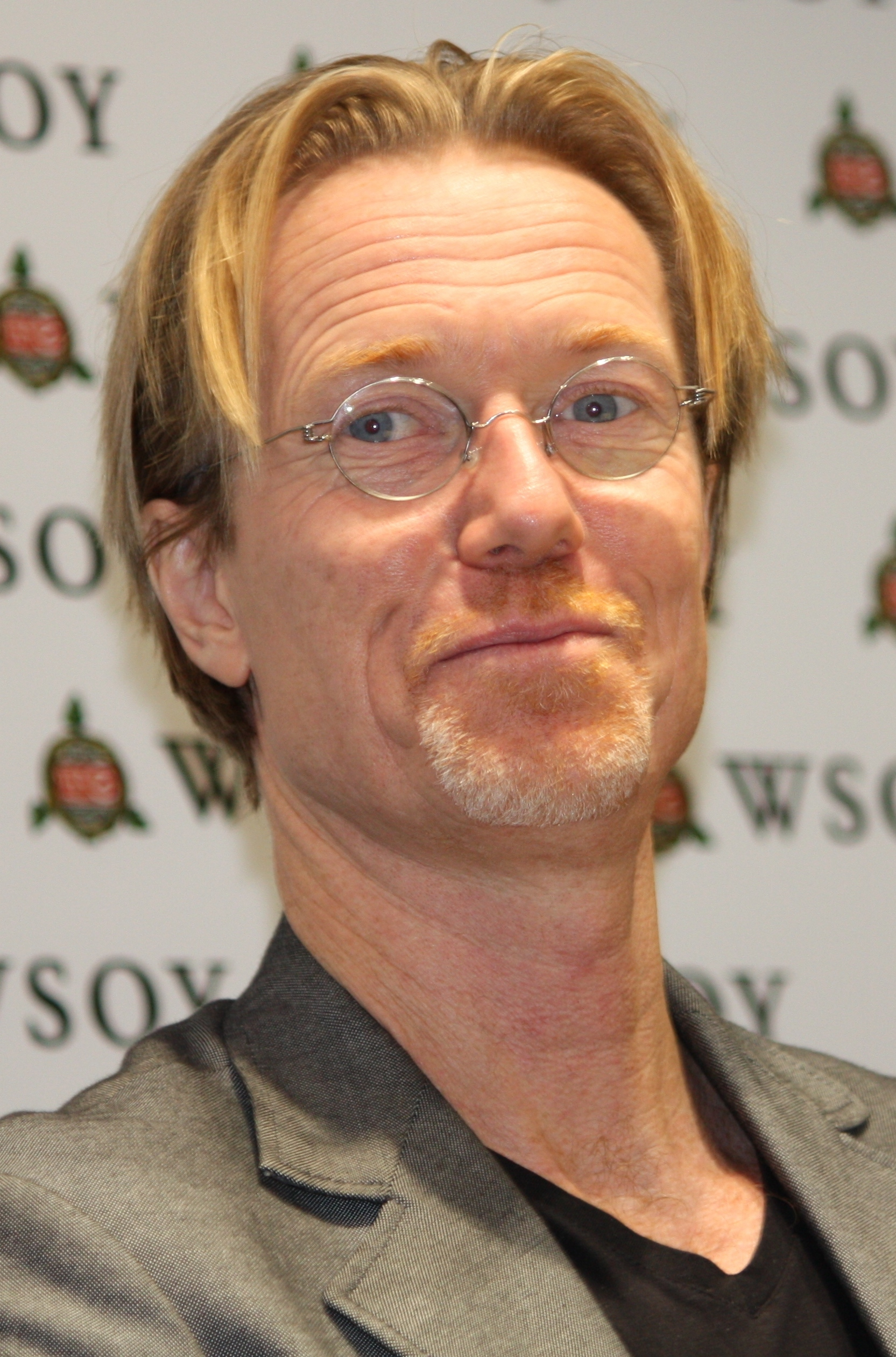
- Anders Roslund at the Helsinki Book Fair 2011
- Born: 1 January 1961 (age 65); Jönköping, Sweden
- Occupations: Writer; journalist
- Writing career
- Years active: 2004–present
- Genre: Crime fiction
- Notable work: Ewert Grens series
- Notable awards: Best Swedish Crime Novel Award (2005, 2009); Glass Key award (2005); CWA International Dagger (2011); KonoMys Award (2017)
- Website: www.andersroslund.se

Nils Anders Micael Roslund (born 1 January 1961) is a Swedish author and journalist. He is best known for his work as part of the crime-writing duo Roslund & Hellström, but has continued to write crime fiction after the death of Börge Hellström in 2017. As part of the duo Roslund & Thunberg he has also written under the name Anton Svensson.

== Early life ==
Anders Roslund was born in Jönköping on 1 January 1961. He grew up in Kristianstad. He lived from time to time at the home of his grandfather where life was quieter than at his own house. He had literary ambitions from an early age.

== Career ==
=== Journalism ===
Roslund moved to Stockholm. In the early 1990s, he was published in the anthology titled Grupp 90, before his work as a TV journalist began to take up more and more of his time. From 1991 to 1992, he worked for the Swedish national broadcaster SVT as a reporter on Rapport. From 1992 to 1993, he was a reporter for the current affairs programme Halv 8 med Stina Dabrowski on TV3, and then returned to SVT and Rapport from 1993 to 1996. From 1996 to 1999, he moved to Aktuellt as a reporter and news director. In 2000, he was tasked with launching Kulturnyheterna, also a current affairs programme, which he headed until 2004, after which he transitioned to becoming a full-time author.

Roslund has won several journalism awards but his work also brought enemies. He was put on a "death list" of an extremist far-right-wing organisation, and for a while employed a bodyguard and was protected by moving into safe houses. He discussed his experience with another Swedish crime writer, Stieg Larsson, who had also received death threats from Neo-Nazis.

=== Fiction ===
==== Roslund & Hellström ====
Börge Hellström (1957–2017), an ex-convict, was one of the founders of Kriminellas Revansch i Samhället (KRIS), an organisation devoted to rehabilitating former criminals. Roslund heard about Hellström's work at KRIS and produced a documentary on the subject of imprisonment and its effects, called Lås in Dom (1998) (Lock them Up). The two met and became friends during the making of the film, and decided to write about their experiences together.

Anders Roslund and Börge Hellström, Roslund & Hellström, formed a duo of crime fiction writers. They were full-time writers from 2004 until Hellström's death in 2017. Among others, they wrote a series of seven books featuring Detective Inspector Ewert Grens, and after Hellström's death, Roslund has kept writing more in that series.

The duo made their debut with the crime novel Odjuret (Pen 33 / The Beast) in 2004. Their novels put a particular emphasis on the roles of victim and perpetrator, offering a morally grey portrayal of motive and responsibility.

Their works have been translated into more than 30 languages.

==== Anton Svensson - Roslund & Thunberg ====
Writing as Anton Svensson, Roslund and Stefan Thunberg, forming the writing duo Roslund & Thunberg, have published the crime novels Björndansen (2014) (The Father : Made in Sweden. Part I, 2016), and En bror att dö för (2017) (The Sons: Made in Sweden. Part II, 2018). Both translated into many languages.

Thunberg is a Swedish screenwriter and author. He has written screenplays for False Trail, as well as everal of the films featuring the fictional characters Martin Beck, Carl Hamilton, and Kurt Wallander. More recently (2017–2021), he has written screenplays for several TV series.

==== Continued writing ====
Roslund continued writing novels in the Detective Inspector Ewert Grens series after Hellström's death, publishing no. 9 in the series, Jamåhonleva (Knock Knock) in 2019. Film rights in the US were sold to Thunder Road.

=== Adaptations ===
In 2012, a TV movie of Odjuret (Pen 33/The Beast) was released, directed by Daniel Alfredson and starring Ola Rapace as the father.

The Informer, a 2019 crime thriller film, is based on Roslund & Hellström’s Three Seconds, directed by Andrea Di Stefano and written by Matt Cook. It stars Joel Kinnaman as the title character, alongside Rosamund Pike, Common, Ana de Armas and Clive Owen.

Box 21 and Cell 8 (Edward Finnigans upprättelse) were made into TV series directed by Swedish director Johan Brisinger, in 2020 and 2022 respectively. Both starred Leonard Terfelt and Mimosa Willamo as detectives Ewert Grens and Mariana Hermansson. Box 21 was filmed in Bucharest and Stockholm, while Cell 8 was filmed in Estonia.

== Other activities ==
Roslund also worked within the Swedish Prison and Probation Service for several years.

== Bibliography ==
=== Ewert Grens series, by Roslund & Hellström ===
- Odjuret (2004, published in English as Pen 33 / The Beast)
- Box 21 (2005, published in English as Box 21 / The Vault)
- Edward Finnigans upprättelse (2006, published in English in 2011 as Cell 8)
- Flickan under gatan (2007)
- Tre sekunder (2009, published in English in 2010 as Three Seconds)
- Två soldater (2012, published in English in 2013 as Two Soldiers)
- Tre Minuter (2016, published in English in 2017 as Three Minutes)

=== Ewert Grens series, by Anders Roslund ===
- Tre Timmar (2018, published in English in 2019 as Three Hours)
- Jamåhonleva (2019, published in English in 2021 as Knock Knock)
- Sovsågott (2020, published in English in 2023 as Sweet Dreams)
- Litapåmig (2021)
- 100 procent (2022)
- Fly (2024)
- Djävulens bästa trick (2025)

=== Made in Sweden series by Anton Svensson ===
pseudonym for Anders Roslund and Stefan Thunberg

- Björndansen (2014, published in English in 2016 as The Father : Made in Sweden. Part I)
- En bror att dö för (2017, published in English in 2018 as The Sons : Made in Sweden. Part II)

== Recognition and awards ==
- Winner, Glass Key Award in 2005 for Pen 33
- Nominated, Best Swedish Crime Novel in 2005 by Swedish Crime Writers' Academy, for Box 21
- Winner, Stockholm City's Book of the Year in 2005 for Box 21
- Winner, Guldpocket (Gold Paperback) for the year's Most Sold Swedish Crime Novel (more than 50 000 copies sold) in 2005 for Pen 33 (Pocketpriset)
- Nominated, Best Swedish Crime Novel in 2006 by Swedish Crime Writers' Academy for Cell 8
- Winner, Platinapocket (Platinum Paperback) for the year's Most Sold Swedish Crime Novel (more than 100,000 copies sold) in 2006 for Box 21
- Nominated, Bookseller's Prize – Box 21
- Winner, Platinapocket for The Year's Most Sold Swedish Crime Novel in 2007 for Cell 8
- Nominated, Bookseller's Prize – Cell 8
- Nominated, Best Swedish Crime Novel in 2007 by Swedish Crime Writers' Academy for Flickan under gatan
- Winner, Platinapocket for The Year's Most Sold Swedish Crime Novel in 2008 for Flickan Under Gatan
- Winner, Best Swedish Crime Novel 2009 – Three Seconds
- On the New York Times list of Notable Crime Fiction for 2009 Box 21
- Awarded the Swedish Stora Läsarpriset (The Great Reader's Prize) 2010, for Three Seconds
- Nominated, Glass Key Award in 2010, for Three Seconds
- Winner, Best foreign mystery & thriller novel translated into Romanian by Romanian Crime Writers Club 2010, for Box 21
- Awarded Platinapocket for The Year's Most Sold Swedish Crime Novel in 2010 for Three Seconds
- Winner, CWA International Dagger 2011 for The Best translated crime, thriller, suspense or spy fiction novel, for UK publication. – Three Seconds
- Nominated, Barry Award for Best British Crime Novel 2011, for Three Seconds
- Nominated, Best Swedish Crime Novel 2012, for Two Soldiers
- Nominated, CWA International Dagger 2013 for Best translated crime, thriller, suspense or spy fiction novel, for UK publication, for Two Soldiers
- Nominated, Best Swedish Crime Novel 2016, for Three Minutes
- Winner, Konomys Award for ‘Best Asian Suspense Novel’ Japan 2017, for The Father : Made in Sweden. Part I
- Nominated, Best Swedish Crime Novel 2017, for The Sons : Made in Sweden. Part II
- Nominated, Best Swedish Crime Novel 2018, for Three Hours
- Shortlisted for Vrij Nederland’s Thriller of the Year Award 2018 Netherlands for Three Hours
- Shortlisted for the Prix du Polar Européen (Best Crime Novel of the Year) France 2019 for Three Seconds
- Shortlisted for the Book of the Year Award in 2020, Sweden for Knock Knock
- Shortlisted for MAX Zilveren Vleermuis award (Best Thriller of the Year) 2021, The Netherlands Sweet Dreams (Vleermuisprijs)
- Shortlisted for the Petrona Award (Best Scandinavian Crime Novel of the Year) UK – 2022, for Knock Knock

== See also ==
- True crime
