= Leonard Terfelt =

Swedish actor (born 1976)

Leonard Daniel Andreas Terfelt (née Jonson; born 20 August 1976) is a Swedish actor.

== Early life ==
Leonard Daniel Andreas Jonson was born on 20 August 1976 in Hägersten, a suburb in Stockholm. He changed his surname to Terfelt.

== Career ==
=== Film and TV ===
Terfelt made his film debut in 2000 in Jalla! Jalla!. In 2007, he had the recurring role of Niillas Kimmel in the TV series Höök. The same year, he starred in the film Leo. He was nominated for a Guldbagge in 2008 for this role.

In 2008-2009 he served the role of Roger Andersson in the TV series Oskyldigt dömd. In 2013 he played the role of Hans von Enke in five films about Kurt Wallander. In 2014, he starred in the film Flugparken opposite, among others, Sverrir Gudnason.

He also appeared in The Bridge in the 4th and last season, as William (Leonora's father), in 2018.

He starred with Mimosa Willamo as detectives Ewert Grens and Mariana Hermansson in two Nordic noir TV series based on crime novels by Anders Roslund and Börge Hellström, Box 21 (2020) and Cell 8 (2022). Both were directed by Johan Brisinger.

=== Stage and radio theatre ===
Terfelt has worked at the Royal Dramatic Theatre. In 2004 he made the role of Roger in the Outside my window, the 2005 Agis in the triumph of love and 2007 Lawyer Helmer in A Doll's House.

In 2006, he starred in the Radio Theatre Performance threats against her life. He has also worked at the National Theatre.

== Acting credits ==
=== Film ===
Year	Title	Role	Notes	Ref.
2000	Jalla! Jalla!			
2005	Four Weeks in June			
2007	Leo			
2012	Studio Sex			
2013	Wallander – Den orolige mannen			
2013	Wallander – Sveket			
2013	Wallander – Saknaden			
2013	Wallander – Mordbrännaren			
2013	Wallander – Sorgfågeln			
2014	Blowfly Park			

=== Television ===
Year	Title	Role	Notes	Ref.
2007	Höök			
2008–2009	Oskyldigt dömd	Roger Andersson		
2011	Anno 1790			
2012	Arne Dahl: Europa Blues			
2014	Real Humans			
2018	The Bridge			
2019	Heder			
2020	Box 21	Ewert Grens		
2020	The Sandhamn Murders			
2021–2024	Young Royals			
2025	The New Force	Jack Hellman		

=== Theatre ===
Year	Title	Role	Theater	Notes	Ref.
2001	Electra	Aigisthos	Uppsala City Theatre		
2011	Long Day's Journey into Night	Jamie	National Swedish Touring Theatre	Stockholm	
2015	Experimentet	Henry	Teater Tribunalen		
2015	Marodörer		Royal Dramatic Theatre	Little stage	
2017	People, Places and Things		The House of Culture		
2024	Son och far	Stepfather	Royal Dramatic Theatre	Little stage	
