= Johan Brisinger =

Swedish film director and writer

- Born: Stockholm, Sweden
- Education: University of Southern California
- Occupations: Film director, writer
- Known for: Suddenly
- Website: johanbrisinger.com

Johan Brisinger is a Swedish film writer and director.

The short film Passing Hearts, which Brisinger wrote and directed in 2004, was honoured with several awards at film festivals around the world, including the audience award at the Berlinale. At the Chicago International Children's Film Festival, it came in second in the adult live action category.

In 2006, Brisinger made his debut as a feature film writer and director with the drama Suddenly (Underbara älskade), starring Michael Nyqvist and Anastasious Soulis. It won the Peoples Choice Award at the Guldbagge Awards in 2007.

His second feature, Among Us (Änglavakt), starring Nyqvist, Izabella Scorupco, and Tchéky Karyo was released in Sweden in March 2010.

He directed two Nordic noir TV series based on crime novels by Anders Roslund and Borge Hellström: Box 21 (2020) and Cell 8 (2022). Both starred Leonard Terfelt and Mimosa Willamo as detectives Ewert Grens and Mariana Hermansson, respectively. Box 21 was filmed in Bucharest and Stockholm, while Cell 8 was filmed in Estonia.
