= Thomas Hanzon =

Swedish actor (born 1962)

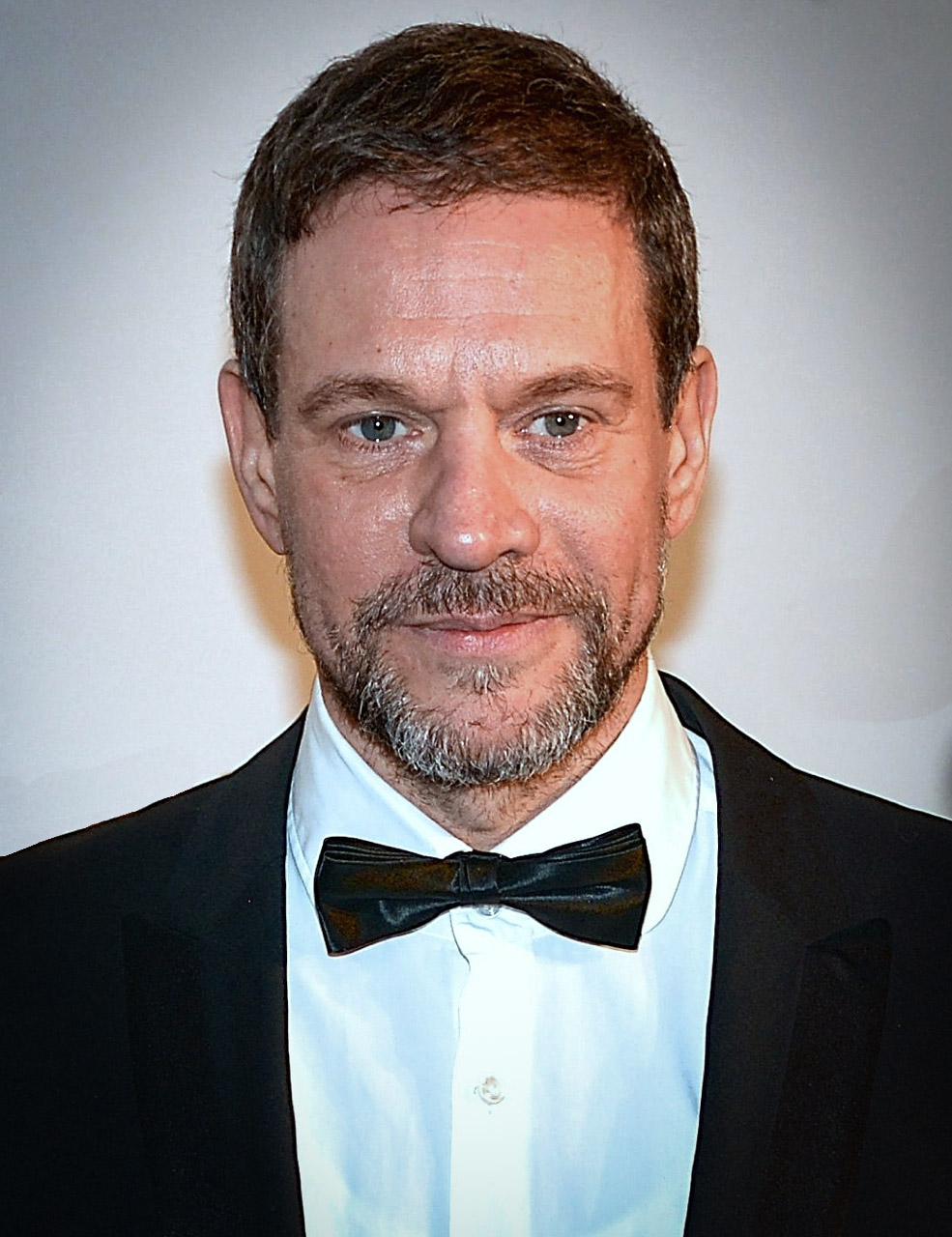
- Hanzon in 2013
- Born: 20 June 1962 (age 64); Stockholm, Sweden
- Occupation: Actor
- Years active: 1985–present

Sven Thomas Hanzon (born 20 June 1962) is a Swedish actor, stage actor at the Royal Dramatic Theatre in Stockholm and former footballer. He has worked with Ingmar Bergman in both movies and on stage.

== Biography ==
=== Early life and football career ===
Hanzon was born Sven Thomas Hansson 1962 in Stockholm.

In his youth, Hanzon played football for Djurgårdens IF, coming through as a full back. He made his senior debut in the derby against Hammarby IF at the age of 17. He also played on the Swedish youth national team. He left a promising career as a professional footballer to pursue an acting career. Ending his career at the age of 18, he had played 21 matches for Djurgården in the Swedish top-tier Allsvenskan, lost the 1980 Swedish junior championship final to Örgryte IS, and played 10 matches for the Sweden U19 team.

Hanzon, with several others, started the theatre group Theater Cameleont in 1982. The group later became Club Cameleont. He wrote A Joker in the Game on behalf of the Swedish Church.

=== Stockholm City Theatre ===
Hanzon was discovered by a producer from the Stockholm City Theatre. He made his debut in 1985 in Arnold. He remained with the theater for several years and received most of his acting education there. He did not stay at the theater due to his lack of formal education, and then became involved in drama.

Hanzon made his film debut in 1987 in Colin Nutley movie Nionde kompaniet. He made his TV debut in 1987 on Swedish Television Drama in Stieg Trenter's series Lysande landning. Ingmar Bergman directed Hanzon in the TV production Private Confessions. He played in the Bergman movie Faithless in 2000, directed by Liv Ullmann. The movie won several honours, including the Festival Award Jury's Special Prize in Belgium.

=== The Royal Dramatic Theatre ===
Hanzon joined the Royal Dramatic Theatre where he had his first role as the young Danceny in Les Liaisons Dangereuses, and he has been part of the permanent ensemble ever since.

With the Royal Dramatic Theatre Hanzon has collaborated in multiple productions with the director Ingmar Bergman. He has also collaborated with directors Stefan Larsson, Tommy Bergren, and Arthur Miller. He has also worked with Lars Norén and Robert Lepage. With the Royal Dramatic Theatre he collaborated with Peter Birro in Den ömhet jag är värd, directed by Stefan Larsson, in 2008, and in Yasmina Reza's God of Carnage, directed by Staffan Roos, in 2009.

== Selected filmography ==
- 1987 – Nionde kompaniet (Ninth Company)
- 1994 – Leken
- 1994 – Yrrol
- 1995 – Älskar, älskar inte (Loving, Not Loving)
- 1997 – Tic Tac
- 1998 – Mighty Joe Young (voice as Gregory O'Hara)
- 1999 – Vägen ut
- 2000 – Hassel – Förgörarna
- 2000 – Trolösa
- 2000 – Livet är en schlager
- 2000 – The Little Mermaid 2 (voice as Eric)
- 2001 – Det största i världen
- 2002 – Beck – Sista vittnet
- 2005 – Van Veeteren – Borkmanns punkt
- 2005 – Van Veeteren – Münsters fall
- 2005 – Van Veeteren – Carambole
- 2006 – Van Veeteren – Svalan, Katten, Rosen, Döden
- 2006 – Van Veeteren – Fallet G as Münster
- 2007 – Underbar och älskad av alla (Wonderful and Loved by Everyone)
- 2011 – Jag saknar dig as Albert
- 2014 – Medicinen (The Medicine) as Magnus
- 2015 – Sverige år fantastiskt (Sverige er fantastisk) as Svend-Erik
- 2015 – Dödsdansen – generalrepetitionen (The Dance of Death – General Rehearsal)
- 2015 – Så ock på Jorden (Heaven on Earth) as Bruno
- 2016 – Jag älskar dig – en skilsmässokomedi (I Love You – A Divorce Comedy) as Nils
- 2016 – Krigarnas ö (The Name of the Game) as Police
- 2024 - In the Name of God as Jonas

== TV theatre, TV series selected ==
- 1987 – Lysande landning
- 1989 – Tiger Rag
- 1990 – Destination Nordsjön (Destination North Sea)
- 1996 – Anna Holt – polis
- 1996 – Ett sorts Hades
- 1996 – Enskilda samtal
- 1996 – Zonen
- 1999 – Personkrets 3:1
- 2002 – Pappa polis
- 2003 – Solisterna
- 2003 – Vera med flera
- 2005 – Livet enligt Rosa
- 2005 – Wallander as Zoran
- 2006 – Ørnen: En krimi-odyssé (The Eagle) as Patrik
- 2007 – Leende guldbruna ögon (Golden Brown Eyes) as Hasse Manheimer
- 2007 – Der Kommissar und das Meer (The Inspector and the Sea) as Kristian Norström
- 2007 – Kodenavn Hunter as Göran
- 2008 – Häxdansen as Patrik
- 2008 – Livvagterne (The Protectors) as Gabriel Magnusson
- 2008 – Livet i Fagervik as Jörgen Wikman
- 2012 – Hellfjord as Bosse Nova
- 2013 – Morden i Sandhamn – den innersta kretsen (The Sandhamn Murders) as Ingmar
- 2013 – Maria Wern – Drömmen förde dig vilse (Maria Wern) as Anders
- 2014 – Portkod 1525
- 2018 – Der Kommissar und das Meer
- 2019 – Das Mädchen am Strand
- 2020 – Agent Hamilton

== Theatre ==
Year	Role	Production	Director	Theatre
1985	David	Arnold; Harvey Fierstein	Jan Maagaard	Stockholm City Theatre
1986	Resident	Perikles; William Shakespeare	Eva Ultz	Stockholm City Theatre
1986	Boy 1	The park Botho Strauss	Jan Maagaard	Stockholm City Theatre
1989	Danceny	Dangerous Liaisons; Pierre Choderlos de Laclos	Brigitte Ornstein	Royal Dramatic Theatre
1990	Blixt	Amorina; Carl Jonas Love Almqvist	Peter Stormare	Stockholm City Theatre
1991	Egil; The old man son Egil; Böjgen; Fool; Ingert, in the third part	Peer Gynt; Henrik Ibsen	Ingmar Bergman	Royal Dramatic Theatre
1991	Tybalt	Romeo och Julia; William Shakespeare	Peter Langdal	Royal Dramatic Theatre
1991	John	Peter Pan; J.M. Barrie	Jackie Söderman	Royal Dramatic Theatre
1992	Romeo	Romeo och Julia; William Shakespeare	Peter Langdal	Royal Dramatic Theatre
1992	Happy	Death of a Salesman; Arthur Miller	Arthur Miller	Royal Dramatic Theatre
1993	Joey	The Homecoming	Thommy Berggren	Royal Dramatic Theatre
1993	The King	Happy Birthday!	Lars Löfgren	Royal Dramatic Theatre
1994	Gustaf Mauritz Armfelt	Strindberg behind the scenes		
1995	Philinte	Misantropen; Molière	Ingmar Bergman	Royal Dramatic Theatre
1998	Heiner	The Human Circle 3:1; Lars Norén	Lars Norén	Royal Dramatic Theatre
1998	Calisto	Celestina; Fernando de Rojas	Robert Lepage	Royal Dramatic Theatre
2001	Henrik	Life in three versions	Kia Berglund	Royal Dramatic Theatre
2002	Adolphe	Rus; August Strindberg	Stefan Larsson	Royal Dramatic Theatre
2003	Multiple characters	Alice i Underlandet; Lewis Carroll, Lucas Svensson and Ole Anders Tandberg	Ole Anders Tandberg	Royal Dramatic Theatre
2004	Axel	Friends; August Strindberg	Hilda Hellwig	Royal Dramatic Theatre
2006	Banquo	Macbeth; William Shakespeare	Staffan Valdemar Holm	Royal Dramatic Theatre
2006	Wurm	Intrigue and Love; Friedrich Schiller	Hilda Hellwig	Royal Dramatic Theatre
2009	Alain Reille	Le Diu du Carnage; Yasmina Reza	Staffan Roos	Royal Dramatic Theatre
2010	Bill Fordham	August: Osage County; Tracy Letts	Stefan Larsson	Royal Dramatic Theatre
2012	Oscar Ekdahl	Fanny and Alexander; Ingmar Bergman	Stefan Larsson	Royal Dramatic Theatre
2013	Oscar Ekdahl	Fanny and Alexander; Ingmar Bergman	Stefan Larsson	Royal Dramatic Theatre
2013	Johan Tönnesen	The societys mainstay	Gunnel Lindblom	Royal Dramatic Theatre
2013	Tamburmajoren	Woyzeck	Michael Thalheimer	Royal Dramatic Theatre
2014	Oscar Ekdahl	Fanny and Alexander; Ingmar Bergman	Stefan Larsson	Royal Dramatic Theatre
2014	Paul	Schwarzes Tier Traurigkeit	Tobias Theorell	Royal Dramatic Theatre
2014	Kurt	The Dance of Death; August Strindberg	Stefan Larsson	The Maxim Theatre
2015	Oscar Ekdahl	Fanny and Alexander; Ingmar Bergman	Stefan Larsson	Royal Dramatic Theatre
2015	Eugene Jr	And give us shadows Lars Norén	Eirik Stubø	Royal Dramatic Theatre
2016	Friedrich Hofreiter	The big expanse Arthur Schnitzler	Tobias Theorell	Royal Dramatic Theatre
2016	Oscar Ekdahl	Fanny and Alexander; Ingmar Bergman	Stefan Larsson	Royal Dramatic Theatre
2017	Oscar Ekdahl	Fanny and Alexander; Ingmar Bergman	Stefan Larsson	Royal Dramatic Theatre
2017	Farmhand; Johan	Molnens brother Barbro Lindgren	Lars Rudolfsson	Royal Dramatic Theatre
2017	Eugene Jr	And give us shadows Lars Norén	Eirik Stubø	Royal Dramatic Theatre
2018	Gustav Adolf Ekdahl	Fanny and Alexander; Ingmar Bergman	Stefan Larsson	Royal Dramatic Theatre
2018–2019	Multiple characters	Peer Gynt; Henrik Ibsen	Michael Thalheimer	Royal Dramatic Theatre
2018–2019	I	A night in the Swedish summer Erland Josephson	Eirik Stubø	Royal Dramatic Theatre
2019	Kurt	The Death Dance; August Strindberg	Stefan Larsson	The Maxim Theatre
2020		We here you -Greta Thunberg speech Jacob Hirdwall	Ada Berger and Jacob Hirdwall	Royal Dramatic Theatre

== Audiobooks (selection) ==
- 2020 – Flowers over hell by Ilaria Tuti
- 2020 – Unhappy in Paradise by Christian Rück
- 2020 – Edward Finnigans restoration by Anders Roslund and Börge Hellström
- 2020 – Sleep Tight by Anders Roslund
- 2019 – Box 21 by Anders Roslund and Börge Hellström
- 2019 – Moratorium by Monica Rehn
- 2019 – Dark Powers by Torsten Bengtsson
- 2019 – Unlikely reasons by Hannes Dükler
- 2019 – Happy Birthday! by Anders Roslund
- 2018 – The Phenomenon Ingvar Kamprad by Anders Ström
- 2018 – The chef that got out of his room by Nicolas Jaquenout
- 2018 – The Beast by Anders Roslund and Stefan Thunberg
- 2017 – Exit West by Mosin Hamid
- 2017 – A brother to die for by Anders Roslund and Börge Hellström
- 2016 – Three minutes by Anders Roslund and Börge Hellström
- 2019 – The Bear Dance by Anders Roslund and Stefan Thunberg

== Prize and distinction ==
- 1998 – George hatt- for People cirkel 3:1
- 2012 – Gunn Wållgren Award
- 2015 – Daniel Engdahls-award

== Jury work ==
Thomas Hanzon has been in many different juries for film awards.

- "Risings Star" on Stockholm International Film Festival 2015
- "Best Female Actress" on Internationell Emmy Awards 2016
- Head Jury, XXIX Stockholm Competition on Stockholm International Film Festival 2018
