= Roslund & Hellström =

Swedish duo of crime fiction writers

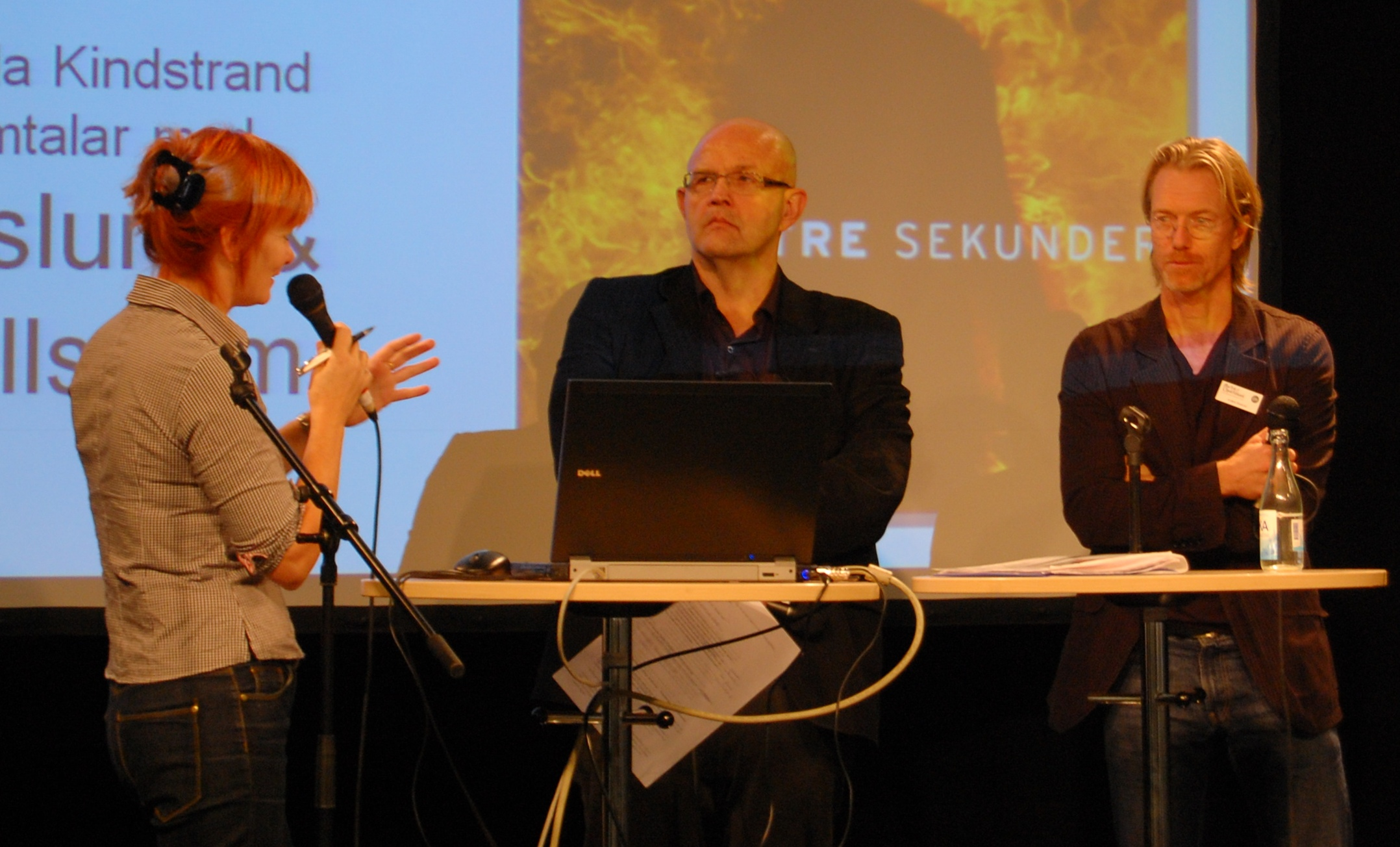
- The writing duo Roslund & Hellström at the 2009 Gothenburg Book Fair
- Writing career
- Years active: 2004–2016
- Genre: Crime fiction
- Notable work: Ewert Grens series
- Notable awards: Best Swedish Crime Novel Award (2005, 2009); Glass Key award (2005); CWA International Dagger (2011); KonoMys Award (2017)
- Website: www.andersroslund.se

Roslund & Hellström were a Swedish duo of crime fiction writers comprising journalist Anders Roslund and activist and author Börge Hellström. They were full-time writers from 2004 until Hellström's death in 2017. Among others, they wrote a series of seven books featuring Detective Inspector Ewert Grens, and after Hellström's death, Roslund has kept writing more in that series.

== Background ==
Roslund (born 1961), was formerly a journalist and TV presenter. He worked for 15 years for the Swedish national broadcaster SVT, directing Kulturnyheterna, a current affairs programme. He won several journalism awards, including the Swedish Trade Unions Award for Investigative Journalism, but his work also brought enemies. He was put on a "death list" of an extremist far-right-wing organisation, and for a while employed a bodyguard and was protected by moving into safe houses. He discussed his experience with another Swedish crime writer, Stieg Larsson, who had also received death threats from Neo-Nazis. He also worked within the Swedish Prison and Probation Service for several years.

Hellström (1957–2017), an ex-convict, was one of the founders of Kriminellas Revansch i Samhället (KRIS), an organisation devoted to rehabilitating former criminals. He had been sexually abused as a child and later turned to crime.

Roslund heard about Hellström's work at KRIS and produced a documentary on the subject of imprisonment and its effects, called Lås in Dom (Lock them Up). The two met and became friends during the making of the film, and decided to write about their experiences together.

== Writing career ==
The duo made their debut with the crime novel Odjuret (Pen 33 / The Beast) in 2004. Their novels put a particular emphasis on the roles of victim and perpetrator, offering a morally grey portrayal of motive and responsibility.

They co-authored seven books between 2004 and 2016, their partnership ending when Hellström died on 17 February 2017.

Their works have been translated into Arabic, Bosnian, Bulgarian, Catalan, Chinese, Croatian, Czech, Danish, Dutch, English, Estonian, Finnish, French, German, Greek, Hebrew, Hungarian, Icelandic, Indonesian, Italian, Japanese, Korean, Lithuanian, Macedonian, Norwegian, Polish, Portuguese, Romanian, Russian, Slovak, Slovenian, Spanish, Turkish, Ukrainian, Vietnamese.

Roslund continued writing novels in the Detective Inspector Ewert Grens series after Hellström's death, publishing no. 9 in the series, Jamåhonleva (Knock Knock) in 2019. Film rights in the US were sold to Thunder Road.

== Bibliography ==
=== Ewert Grens series, by Roslund & Hellström ===
- Odjuret (2004, published in English as Pen 33 / The Beast)
- Box 21 (2005, published in English as Box 21 / The Vault)
- Edward Finnigans upprättelse (2006, published in English in 2011 as Cell 8)
- Flickan under gatan (2007)
- Tre sekunder (2009, published in English in 2010 as Three Seconds)
- Två soldater (2012, published in English in 2013 as Two Soldiers)
- Tre Minuter (2016, published in English in 2017 as Three Minutes)

== Adaptations ==
Box 21 and Cell 8 (Edward Finnigans upprättelse) were made into TV series directed by Swedish director Johan Brisinger, in 2020 and 2022 respectively. Both starred Leonard Terfelt and Mimosa Willamo as detectives Ewert Grens and Mariana Hermansson. Box 21 was filmed in Bucharest and Stockholm, while Cell 8 was filmed in Estonia.

== Recognition and awards ==
- Winner, Glass Key Award in 2005 for Pen 33
- Nominated, Best Swedish Crime Novel in 2005 by Swedish Crime Writers' Academy, for Box 21
- Winner, Stockholm City's Book of the Year in 2005 for Box 21
- Winner, Guldpocket (Gold Paperback) for the year's Most Sold Swedish Crime Novel (more than 50 000 copies sold) in 2005 for Pen 33 (Pocketpriset)
- Nominated, Best Swedish Crime Novel in 2006 by Swedish Crime Writers' Academy for Cell 8
- Winner, Platinapocket (Platinum Paperback) for the year's Most Sold Swedish Crime Novel (more than 100,000 copies sold) in 2006 for Box 21
- Nominated, Bookseller's Prize – Box 21
- Winner, Platinapocket for The Year's Most Sold Swedish Crime Novel in 2007 for Cell 8
- Nominated, Bookseller's Prize – Cell 8
- Nominated, Best Swedish Crime Novel in 2007 by Swedish Crime Writers' Academy for Flickan under gatan
- Winner, Platinapocket for The Year's Most Sold Swedish Crime Novel in 2008 for Flickan Under Gatan
- Winner, Best Swedish Crime Novel 2009 – Three Seconds
- On the New York Times list of Notable Crime Fiction for 2009 Box 21
- Awarded the Swedish Stora Läsarpriset (The Great Reader's Prize) 2010, for Three Seconds
- Nominated, Glass Key Award in 2010, for Three Seconds
- Winner, Best foreign mystery & thriller novel translated into Romanian by Romanian Crime Writers Club 2010, for Box 21
- Awarded Platinapocket for The Year's Most Sold Swedish Crime Novel in 2010 for Three Seconds
- Winner, CWA International Dagger 2011 for The Best translated crime, thriller, suspense or spy fiction novel, for UK publication. – Three Seconds
- Nominated, Barry Award for Best British Crime Novel 2011, for Three Seconds
- Nominated, Best Swedish Crime Novel 2012, for Two Soldiers
- Nominated, CWA International Dagger 2013 for Best translated crime, thriller, suspense or spy fiction novel, for UK publication, for Two Soldiers
- Nominated, Best Swedish Crime Novel 2016, for Three Minutes
- Shortlisted for the Prix du Polar Européen (Best Crime Novel of the Year) France 2019 for Three Seconds

== See also ==
- True crime
