= Reptile Memoirs =

2020 novel by Silje O. Ulstein

- Original Norwegian language title, Krypdyrmemoarer (2020)
- Author: Silje Ulstein
- Translator: Alison McCullough
- Language: Norwegian
- Genre: Crime, mystery, thriller, Scandinavian noir
- Publisher: Aschehoug (Norwegian)
- Publication date: 2020
- Publication place: Norway
- English publication date: March 2022
- Media type: Print (paperback, hardback)
- Pages: 398
- ISBN: 0-802-15886-2

Reptile Memoirs (original title in Norwegian: Krypdyrmemoarer, lit. 'Reptile Memoirs') is a 2020 psychological thriller novel by the Norwegian author Silje O. Ulstein (1985–). Set between Ålesund and Kristiansund, Norway between 2003 and 2017, it is written from the alternating perspectives of student Liv, mother Mariam, police officers Roe and Ronja, and Burmese python Nero. It details the intertwining mysteries of the kidnapping of Mariam's daughter, Iben, and the death of Liv's friend Anita and her daughter Aurora.

The book received critical acclaim from major reviewers and authors. It was praised for its plot, originality, suspense, themes, and the characterization of Liv and Nero. In writing Reptile Memoirs, Ulstein drew from Nordic Noir influences, as well as biblical mythology and research on snakes.

Reptile Memoirs was first published in hardcover in 2020 by Norwegian publisher Aschehoug Forlag. It has since been released in paperback and also as an audiobook and ebook. Since its release, Reptile Memoirs has been translated into 13 languages, and publishing rights been sold to 13 publishers.

== Plot ==
Ulstein alternates between the points of view of Liv/Mariam, Nero, Roe, and Ronja, from 2003-2017.

=== Liv/Mariam & Nero ===
In 2003 Ålesund roommates Liv, Egil, and Ingvar buy Nero, a Burmese python, with whom Liv becomes protective. Liv, who was born Sara Schayer, had run away from her negligent mother and sexually abusive brother Patrick. Traumatized by this and seeking sexual release, she becomes sexually aroused by feeding Nero live animals, starting with a mouse, then baby kitten, and puppy, and spiraling from there. One night, she finds Egil flaunting Nero at a party and her room key missing. Enraged, she moves in with her artist friend Anita who has become pregnant with her daughter Aurora by an abusive man, Birk. When they are found by Birk, they call on their drug dealer David to scare him off, for which he demands Anita help Egil and himself rob Egil's father. Anita leaves Aurora with Liv, who leaves to save Ingvar from a fake seizure. She returns to find that Nero strangled Aurora to death. After Anita finds her burying Aurora, she escapes to David's apartment, but he drunkenly rapes her. She kills him in retaliation, gives Nero to her friend Carol, and leaves Ålesund. She starts over in Kristiansund as Mariam Lind, raising her daughter Iben with her husband. In 2017, Iben runs away while they are shopping and gets kidnapped. She gets questioned by police officer, Roe, who suspects her of kidnapping Iben. In grief, she goes through Iben's room, where she discovers her lost key. Wanting answers, she moves back with Ingvar and retrieves Nero from Carol in Ålesund. Suspecting Patrick of being the kidnapper, she unsuccessfully tries to determine his whereabouts from her mother. She soon realizes she is being followed by Birk, who says he recognized her in the news from Anita's paintings and tipped her off to the police. Later, Mariam finds out from her landlady that Roe visited, adding to her suspicions. She speaks with Egil in prison and he admits to killing Patrick with Nero, also informing her that Roe is Anita's father. She heads to Roe's apartment, where he binds and interrogates her. She escapes, stabs Roe, and discovers that Carol is David's mother from files in Roe's apartment. She heads to Carol's with Nero, and finds that Carol has kept Iben captive in her cellar as revenge for killing her son. As Carol is about to kill Iben, Nero sneaks up and kills her.

=== Roe ===
In 2017 Kristiansund Roe suspects Mariam in Iben's case and Anita's death. In 2005, he had investigated the burglary of Egil's father. That day, his daughter and granddaughter had supposedly died in a fire, but their autopsies show they were beaten and strangled, so begins to suspect Birk. In 2012, a grateful Egil visited Roe and sees a portrait of Anita hanging on Roe's wall, realizing she's Roe's daughter. In 2015, Roe revisits the case, discovering Anita was involved in the robbery, and confronts Egil, who admits to knowing Anita from school. In 2017, Roe searches through Anita's belongings at Ingvid's place, finding snake sketches, a young girl he recognizes as Mariam Lind, and a key necklace he takes with him. In prison, Egil admits to knowing Liv/Mariam and tells him that the key unlocks her old room. In Liv's room, he finds photos of her, Nero, and baby items belonging to Aurora. In the present day, Mariam comes to Roe's place, and she confesses everything but says she knows nothing about Anita's death or Iben's location. She escapes and stabs him. Finally, Iben visits Roe in a hospital and Ronja tells Roe that Birk has been convicted of murdering Anita.

=== Ronja ===
In 2017 Kristiansund, detective Ronja is ordered by her boss, Shahid, to investigate Iben's case. She and her colleague, August, interview Iben's father, Tor Lind, and discover Iben's biological father is unknown, as Mariam was raped. Later, Ronja and her colleague Birte interview a psych patient named Robert, who saw Iben get abducted, and he gives a description matching that of Roe. After being recommended to do so by Birte, Ronja and August watch Roe's prior interview, noticing how comparatively unprofessional he acted confronting Mariam, and begin to suspect him. Ronja sees Roe in the store security footage, and they inform Shahid, who recommends they contact him. Birte, August, and Ronja call Roe's acquaintances and find out that Mariam knew Anita. When they talk to Tor, they spot Roe spying on the house and arrest him, finding photos of Mariam all over his apartment. Ronja starts looking into David's case and realizes he is Iben's father. They head to Roe's, who tells them to head to Carol's. They confirm Nero has killed Carol and spared Mariam and Iben, after which they all celebrate.

== Major characters ==
- Mariam Lind (previously "Liv" and born Sara Schayer) — Primary owner of Nero. She was born Sara Schayer in an unsupportive household and was abused as a girl by her brother Patrick. She has noticeable signs of PTSD, especially dissociative disorder and she runs away twice, first as Liv, and secondly as Mariam. She is Anita's lover, a tomboy, and roommate of Ingvar and Egil. As Mariam, she is the wife of Tor, mother of Iben, and a successful business owner.
- Roe Olsvik — a jaded police officer. He is Anita's father and Aurora's grandfather. He is tall, with broad shoulders, and is 60 in 2017.
- Ronja — a positive police detective. She is open, welcoming, and in love with her police partner August.
- Nero — a self-aware Burmese python. He is originally owned by Carol, who gives him to Liv through her son David.
- Patrick Schayer — Sara's brother. He is largely a loner, though he is friends with Ingvar. He sexually abused Sara when they were young.
- Anita Fuldmark (née Olsvik) — Liv's lover, Aurora's mother, and Birk's partner. She is Egil's schoolfriend and a painter.
- Birk Fludmark — Anita's partner. He is a family friend of the Olsviks. He is physically abusive towards Anita and jealous of her art.
- Aurora Fludmark — Anita and Birk's daughter. She is strangled to death by Nero.
- Ingvar — Liv and Egil's stoner musician roommate. He has long hair and a beard, plays guitar, and is at risk of epileptic seizures. The roommates have an agreement that they will rescue him should he call and not respond, his signal for a seziure.
- Egil Bincep — a playboy, handsome, cool student who is roommates with Liv. He dislikes his father Harvel and instigated the robbery with David and Anita. He befriends Roe but ends up back in prison.
- Tor Lind — Mariam's laid-back husband and Iben's legal father. He is a politician.
- Iben Lind — Mariam's daughter, Tor's legal daughter, and David's biological daughter. She is 11 years old and is in 6th grade.
- August — a Danish police detective. He is Ronja's boyfriend.
- Carol Holloway (née Lorenson) — an attractive Norwegian-American American actress who befriends Liv/Mariam. She is Nero's original owner and David's mother.
- David Lorenson — Liv's rapist and Iben's biological father. He is killed by Liv. Originally, he was the roommates' dealer and a petty criminal.
- Robert Scherkobe — a psychiatric patient who saw Roe with Iben.
- Shahid — the rational police leader, in his 50s.

== Setting ==
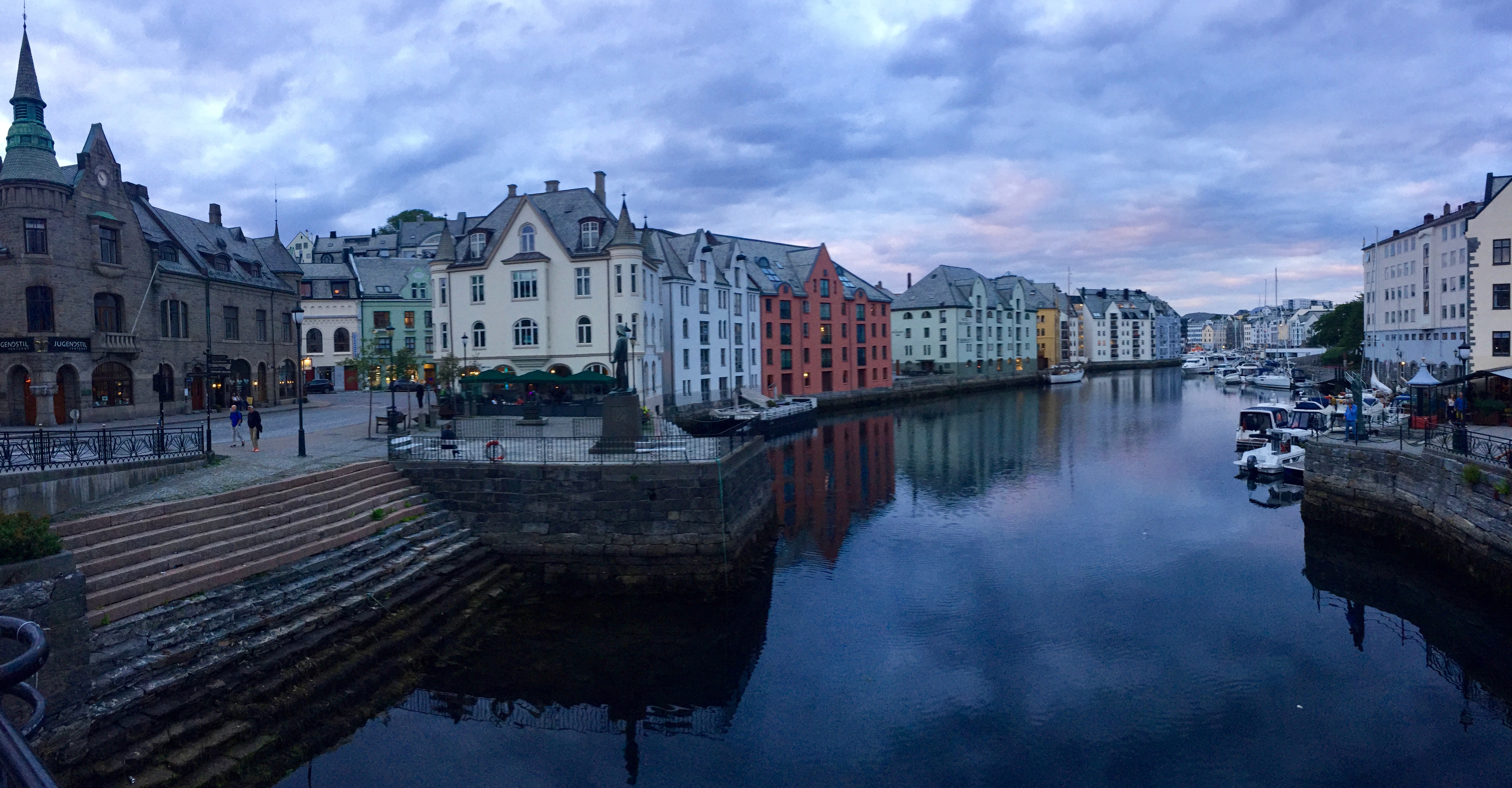
Town center in Ålesund, Norway

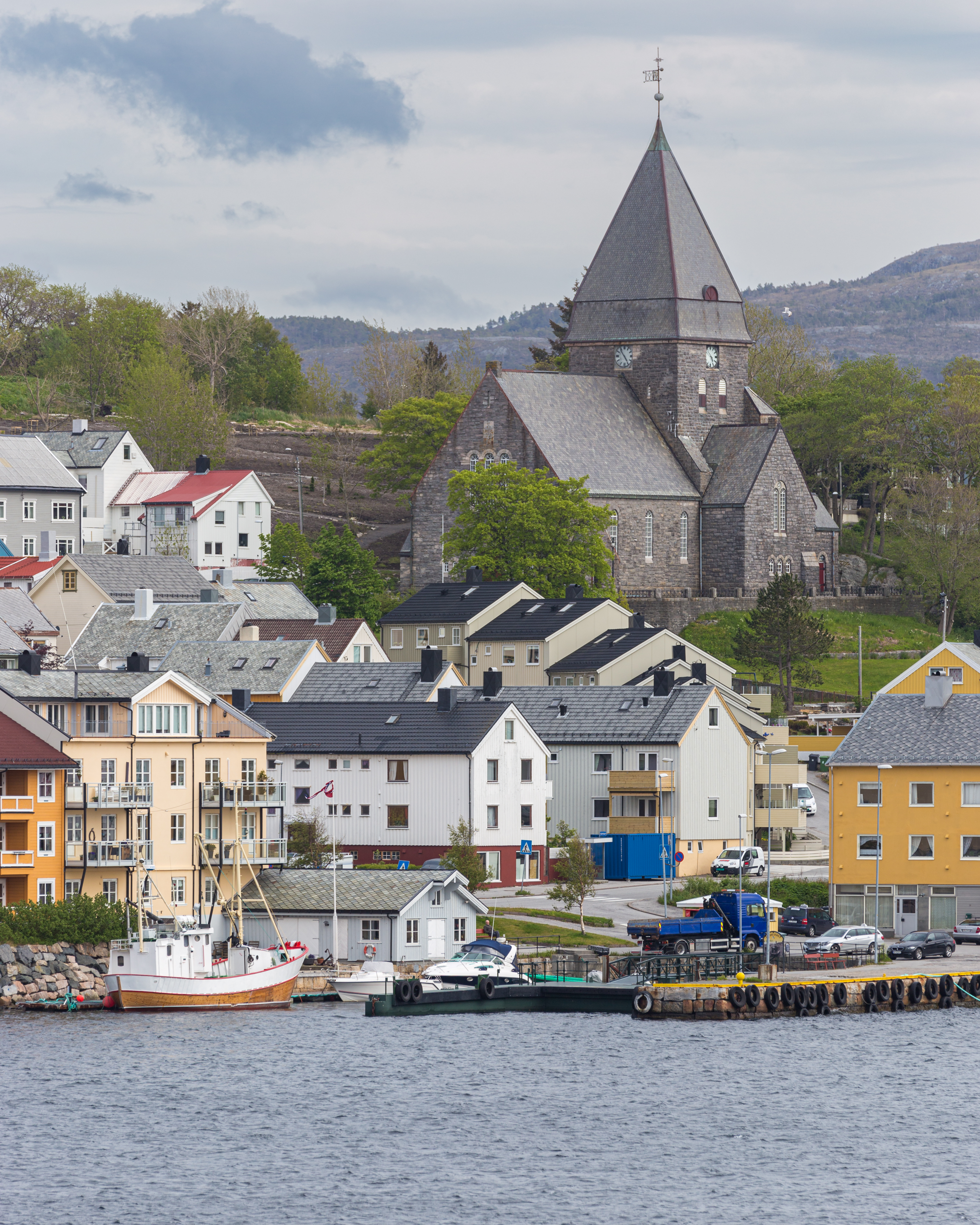
City of Kristiansund, Norway

The setting took place in two major cities: Ålesund and Kristiansund. Liv lived at her first house after moving away from her family with Egil and Ingvar. This was the setting for many major scenes throughout the novel. Liv also frequently went to Anita and Birk's house to stay with Anita while Birk was away. Liv's second place in Ålesund was a small apartment where her and Nero lived after she moved out of the house she had rented with Egil and Ingvar. Egil planned a robbery that took place at his father's house. The police searched the place to try and find the two other burglars, Anita and David. Egil was arrested by Roe before he could make it to the house and was taken to the Ålesund police station. Before Liv moved from Ålesund to Kristiansund, she stayed at David's apartment, where she had been a few times before. This was where he raped her and she killed him.When Mariam was searching for her daughter in Ålesund, she visited her mother's house, Patrick's house, the bar Patrick and Ingvar frequented, and Carol's house.

Mariam was at a local supermarket in Kristiansund when her daughter ran away. When Mariam got back to her house she shares with her husband, Tor, she discovered her daughter was actually missing. After she searched in Ålesund, Mariam went back to Kristiansund to Roe's apartment. Roe and Ronja both worked at the Kristiansund police department and many scenes took place there, while they were investigating Iben's disappearance. Ronja also went to a Psychiatric hospital where she interviewed Robert. He helped her identify Roe as a suspect in the crime.

== Writing ==
=== Author ===
Ulstein holds a Master's degree in Literature from the University of Oslo and has also studied creative writing at the Bergen Writing Academy. Her writing is influenced by the works of renowned thriller authors such as Stephen King and Karin Fossum. In addition, some of her favorite books include Kafka's The Metamorphosis, Dostoyevsky's Crime and Punishment, and Cervantes’ Don Quixotes. When asked about the prevalence of Noir literature in Norway, a country known for its high levels of happiness, Ulstein stated that the fear of losing that happiness has led to a fascination with dark themes.

=== Preparation ===
Ulstein has said that the inspiration for Reptile Memoirs came from a conversation with her friend, who expressed her fear of abandoned cats being adopted by snake owners. Ulstein's fascination with snakes is manifested in the novel, and she conducted extensive research to ensure accuracy in her portrayal of the animal's behavior. She visited zoos, read books, watched documentaries, and scoured YouTube in preparation. Ulstein utilized various traits of Burmese Pythons in the characterization of Nero, including their substandard sight and hearing, their ability to sense ground movement and heat emanating from warm-blooded beings, and their sense of smell through licking the air. Burmese Pythons are also known for killing through suffocation rather than venom, just like how Nero attacked his prey. In developing the relationship between Liv and Nero, Ulstein drew inspiration from the biblical story of Adam and Eve, with Nero as the serpent who tempts Liv. She developed her characters through writing and creating plot charts and sketches, writing one timeline at a time and switching between them as necessary. Ulstein spent four years writing Reptile Memoirs and has hinted at the possibility of a series. In an interview with Nordic Watchlist, she indicated that there would likely be some recurring characters in her next novel.

== Critical reception ==
Silje Ulstein's debut novel was met with mostly positive responses. Reviews were received from well-known critics such as the New York Times and Bookreporter, while also garnering attention from some of Ulstein's contemporaries. The praise for Reptile Memoirs included descriptions such as powerful, enigmatic, intricate, and jaw dropping. Booklist praised Ulstein's characterization, saying that, "Everyone seems guilty in this well-written, pitch-black psychological thriller, whose tense, lost-child theme conjures twisted fairytale tropes." Book Reporter expressed anticipation for a next novel, saying, "Reptile Memoirs is the perfect novel for those who like their mysteries and thrillers delivered in a manner that is a bit left of center but still contains all the crucial elements you would expect from a classic noir investigation story. Silje Ulstein is a talented author, and I am excited to see what she has in store for readers next." The UK Times particularly praised Nero's section, "the sections told from the point of view of Nero, whose prey becomes larger and larger, make you gag. Silje Ulstein is a daringly original writer." The New York Times wrote, "Part fairy tale, part psychological thriller, this tale follows a missing child, a damaged young woman with a pet Burmese python and other inhabitants of a Norwegian coastal town." One review rated her novel six out of six stars and predicted that the author has a great writing career in her future. Another reviewer stated that Ulstein provided a fresh twist to a shocking, gruesome, and surreal story line.

== Critical analysis ==
=== Writing style ===
Silje Ulstein pieces together a Nordic Noir written in both a descriptive and narrative fashion. The author uses personal tone in a detail-oriented writing style while allowing the story to be told through a unique point-of-view approach. The book is written in different time periods from five different characters’ perspectives.

Ulstein weaves a spider metaphor into a disturbing scene in her novel. The brutal act of David raping Liv was explained with graphic description. Liv's response mimics that of a female spider killing the male spider right after mating. This is her own personal form of justice. Liv admires the dangers of nature and the interactions of predator and prey. Her decision to tie up David and strangle him gave her back a semblance of power.

Ulstein also reveals in an interview that she heavily researched snakes in order to paint the vivid imagery found in the reptile's account of the story, and an accurate description of the snake's growth and appetite. Ulstein accomplishes bringing the reader into the snake's world and understanding the ineptitude of his care by his owners.

A Crimefictionlover review identified a repeating theme throughout the novel. As each of the main characters experienced trauma in lives, they reacted by attempting run away or start over. This is similar to a snake shedding its skin. Shedding their skin, won't provide the characters with a new life. The past always tried to catch up with them until they ultimately had to face it. This is an interesting way to weave the concept of the snake's character deeper into the story.

=== Genre ===
Reptile Memoirs falls under a sub-genre of detective fiction called Nordic Noir, which originated in Scandinavia. A review by the bookreporter describes the novel as a Nordic noir that is perfect for readers that like mysteries and thrillers. Like a Nordic noir, this novel is partially told from a police officer's perspective. The plot involves brutal crimes of murder and rape. Scenes such as baby Aurora being killed by Nero, and Liv being raped and beaten up by David are harsh scenes for the reader. In contrast to a typical whodunit story, Nordic noirs have a character that plays the antihero. This character will use questionable methods to solve the crimes. This is seen in Reptile Memoirs when Roe interrogates Mariam by threatening her with a knife and tying her up with a rope. This is not professional for a detective. In a whodunit story, the police officer would have arrested her when she entered the apartment and taken Mariam down to the station for interrogation. Roe wanted answers for personal reasons and didn't want to wait for the permission of his bosses. He believed that he needed to bypass the red tape. The storyline follows a slow-burning pace that matches the Nordic noir genre. While Roe is breaking the law, Ronja is following the rules and solving the case the right way. She needs his help in the end to solve the case. In this story, Roe's questionable methods work in favor of the police and they are able to find Mariam and Iben before any further danger can reach them.
