= Suddenly (2006 film) =

- Film poster
- Swedish: Underbara älskade
- Directed by: Johan Brisinger
- Written by: Johan Brisinger, Mikael Bengtsson
- Produced by: Anders Birkeland; Göran Lindström
- Starring: Anastasios Soulis; Michael Nyqvist; Moa Gammel
- Cinematography: Henrik Stenberg
- Edited by: Stephan Walfridsson
- Music by: Henrik Lörstad
- Release date: 22 December 2006
- Running time: 96 minutes
- Country: Sweden
- Language: Swedish

Suddenly (Swedish: Underbara älskade) is a 2006 Swedish film directed by Johan Brisinger. The film was shot on the island Härmanö in Orust Municipality.

== Plot ==
Jonas, his brother Erik, and his parents are a typical family. The normal stresses and worries and squabbles. Until tragedy strikes one day on the way to grandma's house. Jonas' world is shattered and worse yet, he has to deal with it alone. His father, Lasse, is too distracted with his own grief to be much help. After his father's suicide attempt, they go to the family's summer house where Jonas meets the rather direct Helena. As the summer unfolds, Jonas finally learns how to grieve through his friendship with Helena.

== Cast ==
- Anastasios Soulis - Jonas
- Michael Nyqvist - Lasse
- Moa Gammel - Helena
- Catherine Hansson - Lotta
- Sten Ljunggren - Sven
- Anita Wall - Svea
