= Andrea Di Stefano =

Italian actor and film director (born 1972)

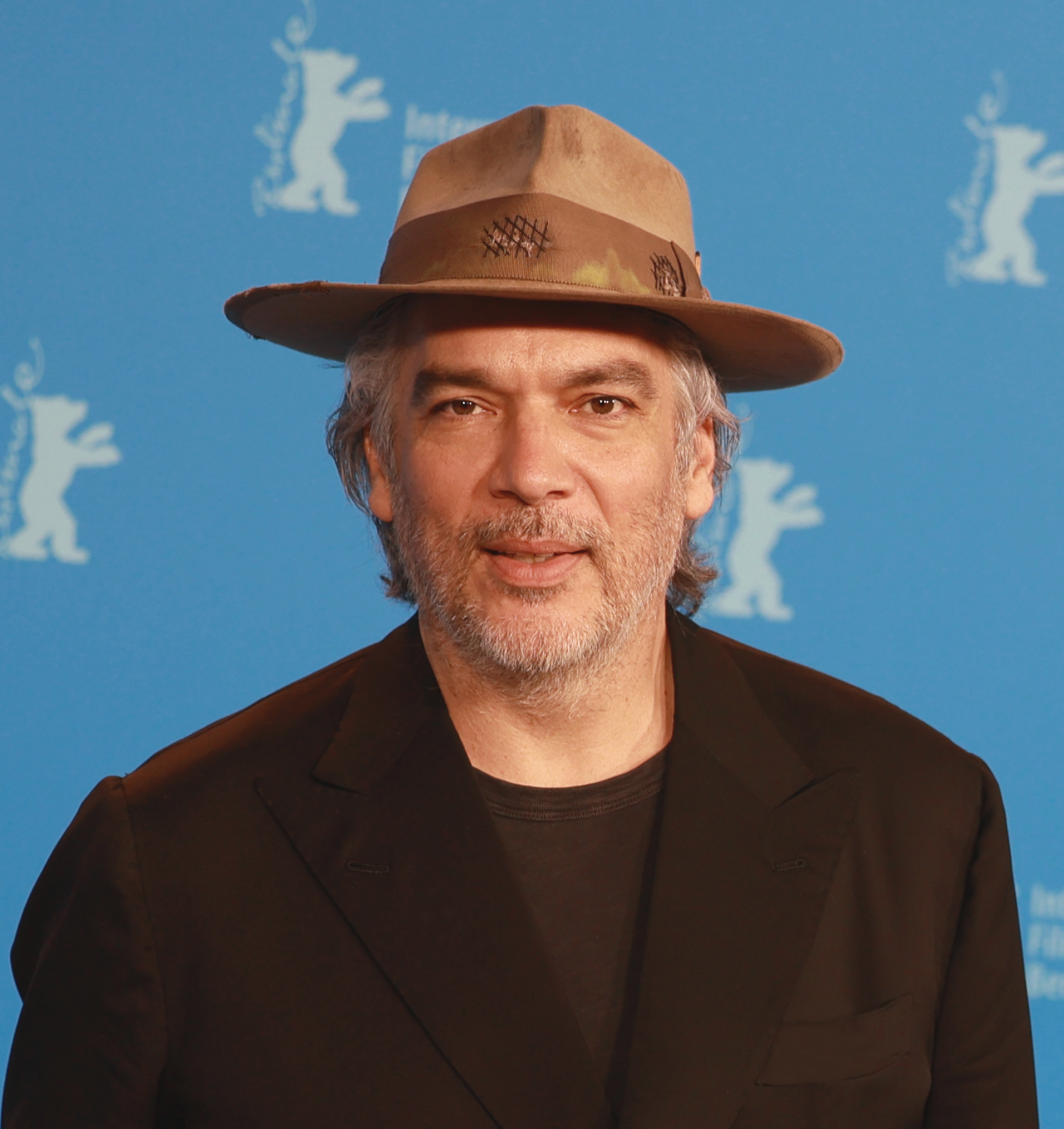
- Born: 15 December 1972 (age 53); Rome, Italy

Andrea Di Stefano (born 15 December 1972) is an Italian actor and film director.

== Life and career ==
Born in Rome, he moved to New York City to study acting at the Actors Studio. In the U.S., he appeared in Smile, an independent movie directed by Andrew Hunt.

He played the leading role in the 1997 film The Prince of Homburg directed by Marco Bellocchio and entered into the 1997 Cannes Film Festival. He has played in films such as Il fantasma dell'opera by Dario Argento, Almost Blue by Alex Infascelli, and Angela by Roberta Torre.

Lately, he played the role of Giancarlo in the movie Sacred Heart directed by Ferzan Özpetek.

Andrea Di Stefano has also appeared in many TV episodes. In 1999, he played the role of Fabrizio Canepa in Ama il tuo nemico by Damiano Damiani. In 2006, he played in the TV movie I colori della gioventù directed by Gianluigi Calderone and in the most recent Medicina generale broadcast in spring 2007, he played Giacomo Pogliani, a talented doctor in a big Roman hospital.

In 2012, he portrayed a priest in the Academy Award-winning film Life of Pi.

In 2014, di Stefano wrote and directed his first feature film, Escobar: Paradise Lost, starring Benicio del Toro and Josh Hutcherson.

In 2016, he played the role of Philip Catelli, in At War with Love, directed by PIF.

In 2019, he co-wrote (with Matt Cook and Rowan Joffé) and directed The Informer, adapted from the crime novel by Börge Hellström and Anders Roslund.

In 2023, Di Stefano directed a mystery thriller film Last Night of Amore, which was screened at the 73rd Berlin International Film Festival in Berlinale Special on 24 February 2023.

In 2025, he directed the sports drama film My Tennis Maestro, starring Pierfrancesco Favino.

== Filmography ==
=== As filmmaker ===
Year	English title	Original title	Notes
2014	Escobar: Paradise Lost		
2019	The Informer		
2023	Last Night of Amore	L’ultima notte di Amore	
2025	My Tennis Maestro	Il maestro	
