= Private Confessions =

1996 film by Liv Ullmann

- Film poster
- Directed by: Liv Ullmann
- Written by: Ingmar Bergman
- Produced by: Ingrid Dahlberg
- Starring: Pernilla August; Max von Sydow; Samuel Fröler
- Cinematography: Sven Nykvist
- Edited by: Michal Leszczylowski
- Release date: 25 December 1996
- Running time: 200 minutes
- Country: Sweden
- Language: Swedish

Private Confessions (Swedish: Enskilda samtal) is a 1996 Swedish drama film directed by Liv Ullmann and written by Ingmar Bergman. It was screened in the Un Certain Regard section at the 1997 Cannes Film Festival.

Private Confessions is also a short TV series in two parts, premiering on Sveriges Television in 1996.

Private Confessions can be seen as the last part of a loosely united trilogy - with the SVT series The Best Intentions (1992) directed by Bille August and Daniel Bergman's directed film Söndagsbarn (1992) as the previous work - based on Ingmar Bergman's stories about his parents complicated relationship life in his marriage and also some of his own childhood memories (all in a somewhat rewritten form). It was the first of the two works that Liv Ullmann was asked to direct on Ingmar Bergman's manuscript; followed by the film Trolösa (2000). The series is divided into two parts of long film length, a total of 195 minutes, and is produced by Sveriges Television in cooperation with the other Nordic national public service broadcasters. Pernilla August was awarded a number of international film prizes. Sven Nykvist, Bergman's long-standing cinematographer, shot the film.

As an independent continuation of the longer series, the story beings with the main couple, the clergyman Henrik (Samuel Fröler) and his wife Anna (Pernilla August), a few years later in the 20th century. The two have begun to grow apart from one another. Anna meets a young student, Tomas Egerman (Thomas Hanzon), and a secret love is born between them. Many years later, Anna, consumed by contradictory feelings and guilty of the deceit against her husband, confides in her old confirmation clergyman, Jacob (Max von Sydow). Through the series, Anna has various profound, existential conversations with the people around her: Jacob, Henrik, Tomas, her mother Karin Åkerblom (Anita Björk) and her friend Märta (Gunnel Fred).

== Cast ==
- Pernilla August as Anna
- Max von Sydow as Jacob
- Samuel Fröler as Henrik
- Anita Björk as Karin Åkerblom
- Vibeke Falk as Ms. Nylander, housekeeper
- Thomas Hanzon as Tomas Egerman
- Kristina Adolphson as Maria
- Gunnel Fred as Märta Gärdsjö
- Hans Alfredson as Bishop Agrell
- Bengt Schött as Stille, verger
