= Box 21 =

2020 Swedish crime drama miniseries

- Based on: Box 21 by Roslund & Hellström
- Directed by: Mani Maserrat
- Starring: Leonard Terfelt; Mimosa Willamo; Simon J. Berger
- Country of origin: Sweden
- Original languages: Swedish; English; Romanian

Original release
- Network: Viaplay
- Release: 17 January 2020

Box 21 is a 2020 Swedish miniseries based on the Roslund and Hellström crime novel of the same name. The story centres on sex trafficking operation between Romania to Sweden. Directed by Mani Maserrat, it features Leonard Terfelt, Mimosa Willamo, and Simon J. Berger in the lead roles. The miniseries premiered on 17 January 2020 on Viaplay. Joakim Sällquist and Ilinca Neacșu both received Kristallen nominations for Box 21; in the categories of Best Actor and Best Actress, respectively.

== Cast ==
- Leonard Terfelt as Ewert Grens
- Mimosa Willamo as Mariana Hermansson
- Simon J. Berger as Tobias Nordwall
- Kristofer Kamiyasu as Sven Sundkvist
- Ilinca Neacșu as Lidia Amariei
- Alexandra Sârbei as Alina Lazariuc
- Sandra Andreis as Anni Grens
- Edda Magnason as Lena Nordwall
- Cristian Bota as Lucian Manea
- Joakim Sällquist as Jochum Lang
- Bahador Foladi as Sam Shirazi
- Ellen Jelinek as Alexandra Johansson
- Jacob Ericksson as Micke Olofsson
- Claes Ljungmark as Ove Karlberg

== Episodes ==
No.	Title	Directed by	Written by	Original release date
1	"Captives"	Mani Maserrat	Unknown	17 January 2020
In a flashforward, a hostage situation unfolds in a hospital morgue. One year earlier in Bucharest, Lidia, a young waitress supporting her mother, is lured to Stockholm by the charming Lucian Manea with promises of work, but instead she is trafficked into forced prostitution. After a misunderstanding, Lidia shaves her head and must don a wig while she visits customers with Alina, who was also trafficked. Meanwhile, Swedish investigator Ewert Gren balances an organised crime investigation against Micke Olofsson with his personal life. He and his pregnant wife Anni, also police, spend time with their close friends, another couple Tobias and Lena Nordwall. Ewert’s informant Karlberg tips him off about Jochum Lang, Micke’s hitman. When Anni and her partner try to arrest him, he runs her over, causing a miscarriage and permanent disability. Jochum receives a mere eight-month sentence after a key witness retracts his statement. While imprisoned, Jochum begins to sympathise with the earnest Sam, only to receive an order to execute him, as he sold bad drugs to Micke’s sister. Jochum is unable to follow through. Alina confronts Lidia about stealing from customers, warning that Janus will rape her, but agrees to help her hide stolen goods, at a transit locker known as “Box 21.” Lucian discovers Lidia’s deception, and contacts Janus, who brutally tortures her. Lucian orders Alina to clean up; she calls for an ambulance. Ewert finds Anni unresponsive.
2	"Plans"	Unknown	Unknown	17 January 2020
With both Lidia and Anni hospitalised, investigator Mariana Hermansson fails to get answers from Alina, who is whisked away by Lucian to a new brothel. Jochum is released from prison and is immediately pressured by Micke to finish the job and kill Sam. Karlberg alerts Ewert about Jochum being ordered to kill Sam. Sam has nowhere to stay after his successful sister Farima rejects him. Alina visits Lidia in the hospital; Lidia asks her to retrieve the money from Box 21, purchase various items like duct tape and cable ties, and steal their customer’s gun (replacing it with a replica). Anni is discharged from hospital after her stroke, but cannot speak or move. Alina is unable to steal the gun, and gives Lidia the replica. Lidia improvises, arranging a ruse with Mariana to knock her out, restrain her, and steal her gun. While at the hospital where Farima works, Sam runs into Jochum, who accosts him with a knife. However, Sam pleads for his life, as his cousin can get a job in Australia and Micke will not know he is alive there. After falsely telling Micke that Sam is dead, Jochum runs into Ewert and his colleague Sven in the hospital lobby, and is detained. Lidia goes to the hospital morgue with Mariana’s gun and takes six hostages: a pathologist and a group of medical students about to begin an autopsy.
3	"Hostages"	Unknown	Unknown	17 January 2020
Karlberg informs Ewert that Jochum said he killed Sam, but that investigation is sidelined by the morgue hostage crisis. Tobias, the chief hostage negotiator, is brought in, while the National Task Force stays on standby. At the new brothel, Alina learns about the hostage situation from TV. Lidia discovers Sam hiding near the morgue and takes him as a hostage too. Lidia makes Tobias an offer via phone: either he can become her hostage, or she will kill one of the seven. Sam ultimately volunteers, saying his life is less valuable than the physicians’. The police debate what to do, and they receive a video message from Sam, which bewilders them since they thought he was already killed by Jochum. A gunshot rings out; Sam’s body is pushed out on a gurney. As officers approach, his body explodes. Lidia reiterates that Tobias must come in. Released from custody, Jochum is upset to hear about Sam's death on the radio, and visits his ex-girlfriend Alex. Tobias agrees to exchange himself for the hostages. They realise Lidia did not kill Sam, instead blew up a similar-looking body from the morgue. Lidia speaks to him in Romanian, and Tobias removes his earpiece and turns off the body camera streaming to Ewert, Mariana, and Sven. Tobias disarms her and starts to strangle her; she activates her bomb and the morgue explodes.
4	"The Box"	Unknown	Unknown	17 January 2020
The explosion kills Lidia and Tobias. Ewert informs Lena, and the police release an image of Alina bringing Lidia supplies at the hospital. Sam tells Ewert that Jochum let him go after he promised to leave Sweden. Ewert in turn tells Karlberg. Alina sees her face on the news, and escapes the brothel. Mariana suspects that Tobias was involved in Lidia's exploitation, having translated the Romanian she spoke to him before the microphone cut out and found a newspaper clipping featuring him in her room at the brothel. Ewert rejects the theory. Alina gets help from a man who helped her find the supplies at the hardware store. Inspired by Sam, Jochum tries to make amends with Alex. Micke learns from Karlberg that he lied about killing Sam; Jochum claims he did not due to the hostage situation, and Micke gives him one more chance: he can either kill Sam or die himself. Sam’s sister Farima agrees to procure a plane ticket to Australia for Sam, but Jochum intercepts him. Ewert and Mariana locate the man who helped Alina; under pressure, he tells them about Box 21. Lucian and Sven end up looking for Alina at central station at the same time. Working separately from his colleagues, Ewert apprehends her, among the contents of box 21 he finds Tobias' watch. Ewert takes Alina to his house and says he is willing to take her to Bucharest.
5	"Bucharest"	Unknown	Unknown	17 January 2020
In Bucharest, Ewert and Alina share a meal. Eventually, she opens up about how she was groomed by Lucian and trafficked to Sweden, where she met the sadistic Janus, who threatened her with his police badge. Alina flees while he is in the restroom, and Farima calls Ewert to report Sam missing. Jochum kills Sam in the wilderness and films it like Micke insisted. Ewert meets the Romanian detective who called him the previous day, Andreea Simionescu. On a bus home to her rural village in Northern Romania, Alina runs into an older woman who knew her as a child, who offers to help her continue her education. Alina reunites with her family. Alex and Jochum tentatively reconcile. Ewert and Andreea visit Lidia's mother, who reveals her husband died suspiciously after uncovering police corruption, which also led to Lidia losing her place in the academy. Andreea concludes she must have meant to kill Tobias, and he must have been corrupt because she would not have harmed a policeman otherwise. Meanwhile, Mariana tells Sven that Ewert has gone to Romania with Alina. Ewert struggles to accept that his friend forced a promising young woman into prostitution. They talk to Dragos, an alcoholic former vice officer, who says there are many Scandinavians who traffick Romanian girls. He identifies Tobias as a ringleader, devastating Ewert. Andreea reminds him that he must act to expose what Tobias did. Jochum leaves Alex's house as the police close in on him. Lucian kills Elina with his car.
6	"Janus"	Unknown	Unknown	17 January 2020
While getting his car fixed in Romania, Lucian rejects Cosmina’s offer to work for him in Sweden, saying she is too young. Jochum plans to drop off the video proving he killed Sam before retiring. Ewert and Lena view Tobias' body; Ewert consoles their daughter Astrid. Ewert gives a briefing to his colleagues about what he did in Romania, but he lies to cover up Tobias' involvement and moves to close the investigation. Janus tells Lucian to traffick more girls. One of the medical students realises she accidentally recorded the entire hostage situation, and reports it to Mariana, who gets a full translation of Lidia’s final statement, which is a damning indictment of Tobias as a sex trafficker. Mariana reviews security footage above Box 21 and realises Ewert knows, and she confronts him. Karlberg calls, interrupting the tense confrontation, to say that Micke plans to kill Jochum, but it is a set-up; Micke has realised Karlberg is a police mole. Micke gives Jochum a gun, and orders him to kill Karlberg, but Jochum kills Micke instead, although he is shot too. Ewert and Mariana arrive to the scene. As he dies, Jochum apologises to Ewert. In the aftermath, Ewert gives the watch implicating Tobias to Mariana. He says he wanted to confess everything, but lost his nerve, and tells her to report everything, and goes home to spend time with Anni. At Tobias’ funeral, Mariana gives the watch back to Ewert, as she does not want to ruin his family's lives. In the final scene, Lucian trafficks Cosmina and takes her to meet Janus, who is revealed to be Tobias' widow, Lena.
