= Deadwind =

Finnish crime drama television series

- Finnish title screen
- Karppi
- Genre: Crime drama; Nordic noir
- Created by: Rike Jokela; Jari Olavi Rantala; Kirsi Porkka
- Directed by: Rike Jokela
- Starring: Pihla Viitala; Lauri Tilkanen; Jani Volanen; Tommi Korpela
- Composer: Juri Seppä
- Country of origin: Finland (Suomi)
- Original language: Finnish
- No. of seasons: 3
- No. of episodes: 28

Production
- Producers: Riina Hyytiä; Jojo Uimonen
- Production locations: Uusimaa, Finland
- Cinematography: Anssi Leino
- Editor: Jussi Lehto
- Running time: 45 minutes
- Production companies: Dionysos Films H&V Production

Original release
- Network: Yle TV2
- Release: 14 March 2018

Deadwind (Finnish: Karppi) is a Finnish crime drama and Nordic noir television series directed and created by Rike Jokela, starring Pihla Viitala, Lauri Tilkanen, Jani Volanen, and Tommi Korpela. It premiered in Finland in March 2018 on Yle TV2 and in August 2018 on Netflix. The show follows Sofia Karppi, a detective of the Finnish police who is recently widowed in her 30s with a young son and teenage stepdaughter living with her. She returns to police work in Helsinki, and her first case is the murder of Anna Bergdahl, a social affairs consultant.

Season 1 received strong reviews after airing in Finland and was compared to the Danish The Killing and to the Danish-Swedish The Bridge. Season 2 of the show premiered on Yle TV on April 5, 2020 and was added to Netflix on July 1, 2020. Season 3 of the show premiered on Yle TV on October 29, 2021. Netflix announced October 29, 2022, as its release date for the third season.

== Synopsis ==
Sofia Karppi (Pihla Viitala) returns to her work as a homicide detective in the Helsinki Police Department while taking care of two children after the accidental death of her husband. Rookie detective Sakari Nurmi (Lauri Tilkanen) is transferred from the financial crime unit to the homicide unit as Karppi's partner. Their first case begins as a routine disappearance.

Women's clothes found at a construction site lead the detectives to the body of Anna Bergdahl (Pamela Tola), a social affairs consultant. She was buried with flowers in her hands at a shore belonging to Tempo, a wind power research firm. It is seeking City Council approval for a major residential development project that will be dependent on windpower.

Anna has been murdered, and her husband, Usko Bergdahl (Jani Volanen), is confused after hearing about the incident. Karppi and Nurmi start investigating Anna's background, such as her job with the Tempo company and its critical construction project.

== Cast ==
- Pihla Viitala as Sofia Karppi
- Lauri Tilkanen as Sakari Nurmi
- Jani Volanen as Usko Bergdahl
- Pamela Tola as Anna Bergdahl
- Eedit Patrakka as Armi Bergdahl
- Elsa Brotherus as Isla Bergdahl
- Tommi Korpela as Alex Hoikkala
- Pirjo Lonka as Julia Hoikkala
- Riku Nieminen as Roope Hoikkala
- Jonna Järnefelt as Linda Hoikkala
- Raimo Grönberg as Tapio Koskimäki
- Mimosa Willamo as Henna Honkasuo
- Noa Tola as Emil Karppi
- Mikko Nousiainen as Jarkko Vaahtera
- Marjaana Maijala as Maria Litma
- Tobias Zilliacus as Rannikko
- August Wittgenstein as Andreas Wolf
- Ville Myllyrinne as JP
- Vera Kiiskinen as Raisa Peltola
- Kari Hietalahti as Louhivuori
- Antti Virmavirta as Lennart
- Ylermi Rajamaa as Kiiski
- Antti Reini as Stig Olander
- Eero Ritala as Leo Rastas
- Jemina Sillanpää as Laura
- Alina Tomnikov as Iiris
- Sulevi Peltola as Tuomas
- Lilga Kovanko as Saara
- Juhani Niemelä as Paavali Pusenius
- Eero Milonoff as Jyränkoski
- Minna Suuronen as Arjatsalo
- Rabbe Smedlund as Fredrik Hoikkala
- Manuela Bosco as Filippa

== Episodes ==
=== Season 1 (2018) ===
No. overall	No. in season	Title	Directed by	Written by	Original release date
1	1	"The Widow" (Leski)	Rike Jokela	Rike Jokela, Kirsi Porkka & Jari Olavi Rantala	14 March 2018
The body of Anna Bergdahl, a social worker and consultant for wind power research firm Tempo and a mother of two, is found buried with flowers in her hand at a shore belonging to Tempo. Sofia Karppi, a recently widowed mother of two and Sakari Nurmi, a transferee from the financial crime unit, are assigned the case. Sofia and Sakari interview Usko Bergdahl, Anna’s husband, who informs them that Anna had been to a party at Tempo while he was away with the children at his mother’s house. He further reveals that Anna recently had a row with one of her clients, Kiiski, a probationer. Sofia is irritated at Sakari's inexperience but is told he will have to do as resources in the department are tight. Usko finds hate-emails from Kiiski in Anna’s laptop and visits Kiiski’s apartment but is left injured by Kiiski who flees. Sofia visits Kiiski's partner and coaxes information out of her that he might be fleeing on a cargo ship. Sofia and Sakari rush to the port where a ship is about to depart and search it, Sofia insisting that they search separately as time is of the essence. Somebody strikes Sofia on the head and she temporarily blacks out.
2	2	"The Party" (Juhlat)	Rike Jokela	Jari Olavi Rantala	21 March 2018
Sofia comes to, but the ship is leaving and she and Sakari must get off it. The chief suggests that Kiiski will be caught in Hamburg. As Sofia and Sakari are about to leave the scene, she notices a man hiding in a cargo crane, who turns out to be Kiiski. They track him down and convince him to turn himself in. Sofia and Sakari interview Kiiski, but security camera footage from the shipyard shows that Kiiski was aboard a cargo ship during Anna’s murder. Camera footage from the party reveals that Anna left the party for an after-party at Stig Olander’s house. Stig informs the police that Anna was invited by his friend Leo Rastas and left alone after flirting with him in the hot bath; meanwhile Leo, who is present in Stig's house, overhears them and leaves surreptitiously. Another detective, Raisa Peltola, joins Sofia and Sakari’s team. Sperm is found in Anna’s body implying that she had sex before the murder; Sakari suspects that Anna was having an affair with Leo. Somebody breaks into Sofia's apartment and is still there when she comes home, but flees before she can catch him. Sofia and Sakari visits Leo’s house, where his wife reveals that Leo has gone hiking for a week; meanwhile, Leo confronts Stig at his house and leaves him injured after an altercation. However, Sofia arrives in time to save Stig from drowning in his bathtub. She then confronts Leo, who reveals that he was having an affair with Stig and not Anna. Photos from Leo’s phone reveal that Anna left the after-party in a car belonging to Alex Hoikkala, Tempo’s director of development. Sofia and Sakari visits Alex’s residence and as soon as they approach his car parked outside the house, it explodes.
3	3	"Do-Gooder" (Maailmanparantaja)	Rike Jokela	Kirsi Porkka	28 March 2018
Alex participates in a TV panel to defend Tempo's wind power project and receives a threat before the live broadcast begins. Karppi finds out the secret between Anna and Alex.
4	4	"The Kidnapping" (Kaappaus)	Rike Jokela	Jari Olavi Rantala	4 April 2018
Alex's wife Linda disappears and Alex receives more threats from a mysterious man named Wolf. Karppi and Nurmi find out surprising things about Anna Bergdahl's life.
5	5	"The Brother" (Veli)	Rike Jokela	Jari Olavi Rantala	11 April 2018
Karppi's superior officer believes that Wolf is behind Anna Bergdahl's murder. Karppi disagrees, continues her own investigation and finds out who was driving Alex Hoikkala's Lexus on the night of Anna's death.
6	6	"Growing Pains" (Kasvukipuja)	Rike Jokela	Kirsi Porkka	18 April 2018
Alex's brother admits that he drove Anna the night she died. Alex orders his brother underground until the city council has voted on Tuulivuorenranta. Karppi faces problems at home.
7	7	"Roots" (Juuret)	Rike Jokela	Kirsi Porkka	25 April 2018
Karppi and Nurmi travel to Rönnvik, Anna Bergdahl's birthplace, and find a small village community that harbors big secrets. The murder investigation takes another unexpected turn.
8	8	"Therapy" (Terapiaa)	Rike Jokela	Jari Olavi Rantala	2 May 2018
Anna's time of death is redefined and Karppi and Nurmi have to look at the murder investigation in a new light. Nurmi follows a lead that leads him into unexpected difficulties.
9	9	"Good Samaritans" (Hyväntekijä)	Rike Jokela	Kirsi Porkka	9 May 2018
Karppi and Nurmi find a clue in Anna Bergdahl's youth that leads them to a charity organization called "Baltic Friends". Usko is having trouble keeping himself together.
10	10	"Alone" (Yksin)	Rike Jokela	Jari Olavi Rantala	16 May 2018
Koskimäki forces Karppi on sick leave and appoints JP to lead the investigation. Karppi doesn't give up. Nurmi chooses his side. The desperation of Usko drives him to extreme solutions.
11	11	"Bruises" (Ruhjeita)	Rike Jokela	Kirsi Porkka	23 May 2018
Karppi and Nurmi travel to Germany, where investigations proceed without official permission or support, taking on a dangerous tone. The city council votes on the fate of Tuulivuorenranta.
12	12	"The Beginning" (Alku)	Rike Jokela	Rike Jokela, Kirsi Porkka & Jari Olavi Rantala	30 May 2018
Anna Bergdahl's murder mystery is solved. Karppi is in danger. Nurmi reveals his surprising plans to Karppi.

=== Season 2 (2020) ===
No. overall	No. in season	Title	Directed by	Written by	Original release date
13	1	"Whisper of the stars"(Tähtien kuiskailua)	Rike Jokela	Kirsi Porkka	5 April 2020
Two bodies are found with the a cloth over their eyes, one in Helsinki and the other in Tallinn. Sofia Karppi, who is going on vacation, hands over the case to Sakari Nurmi, who is returning to the murder squad. However, everything changes when the killer strikes again.
14	2	"Charming" (Meelika)	Rike Jokela	Jari Olavi Rantala	12 April 2020
Karppi is shocked by the murder of her superior officer and takes over the main responsibility for the investigation. Karppi and Nurmi start following the lead left by their boss's last message. The mayor of Helsinki, Sara Tulisuo, who is the force behind the tunnel construction to Tallinn, is accused of corruption.
15	3	"Lady Justice" (Oikeuden jumalatar)	Rike Jokela	Harri Virtanen	19 April 2020
Karppi has a theory that the murderer has taken justice into their own hands and is taking revenge on the people they consider guilty. The tracks unexpectedly lead to the Helsinki City Hall, where the murderer is targeting the mayor herself.
16	4	"Trade-off" (Vaihtokaupat)	Rike Jokela	Kirsi Porkka	26 April 2020
A prisoner exchange is suggested to the police, but it turns out to be a diabolical sham. Karppi's stepdaughter Henna has gotten into trouble because of the stash of drugs she stole. The drug dealer forces Henna to accompany him to Estonia.
17	5	"Paldiski" (Paldiski)	Rike Jokela	Jari Olavi Rantala	3 May 2020
Mayor Tulisuo, who was kidnapped in the tunnel, is feared dead. Henna's smuggling gig ends in a surprising way. Karppi receives a message from beyond the grave that changes the direction of the murder investigation.
18	6	"Missing" (Kadonneet)	Rike Jokela	Harri Virtanen	10 May 2020
The noose around the wanted murderer tightens, but Karppi has her own doubts. Henna is fighting for her life. The city council of Helsinki is cleaning up their act.
19	7	"Mayday" (Mayday)	Rike Jokela	Kirsi Porkka	17 May 2020
The murder spree, which was already declared solved, takes Karppi and Nurmi to Estonia, where a new threat awaits, but they find an unexpected way to escape. Henna confesses her terrible secret to Sofia.
20	8	"Black water" (Mustaa vettä)	Rike Jokela	Jari Olavi Rantala	24 May 2020
The mystery is solved. Solutions are made, but will justice be done?

=== Season 3 (2021) ===
No. overall	No. in season	Title	Directed by	Written by	Original release date
21	1	"The Cage"(Häkki)	Rike Jokela	Kirsi Porkka, Rike Jokela, Jari Olavi Ranta	29 October 2021
The murder of a caged medical researcher forces Karppi, who is on leave, to return to work and for Nurmi to become her work partner again. The cuts found on the body's back lead to a complicated murder mystery. Karppi's step-daughter Henna comes across the harsh everyday life of a criminal released from prison.
22	2	"Back Room" (Takahuone)	Rike Jokela	Jari Olavi Rantala	29 October 2021
More victims appear and the murders seem to be centered upon the pharmaceutical industry. Karppi receives a mysterious phone call from Germany regarding her husband's death. Nurmi meets Laura, who got into bad trouble and claimed Nurmi as the father of her child. Henna continues to struggle.
23	3	"The Container" (Kontti)	Rike Jokela	Kirsi Porkka, Jari Olavi Ranta	29 October 2021
Bodily remains are found in the sewer, which Karppi tries to connect with the murder mystery she is investigating. Laura ends up in the hospital and Nurmi starts to track down the missing boy she claims is his son. Henna is pressured by both criminals and the police.
24	4	"Kos" (Kos)	Rike Jokela	Jari Olavi Ranta	29 October 2021
Laura becomes the target of an attempted murder and the management of the pharmaceutical company becomes entangled in it. Karppi and Nurmi find their way to the hiding place used by the murderer and at the same time track down the symbol seen in connection with the bodies. Henna is taken deeper into the criminal underworld.
25	5	"Kansas" (Kansas)	Rike Jokela	Harri Virtanen	29 October 2021
The riddle of the symbol leads Karppi and Nurmi to investigate the death of a young girl who died from an overdose a year ago. Henna is revealed and falls into deeper trouble. Nurmi gets his hands on a dashboard camera video filmed in Germany, which contains a surprise about Karppi's husband's death.
26	6	"The Road" (Tie)	Rike Jokela	Kirsi Porkka	29 October 2021
Karppi, wanted by the police, continues the investigation on her own and encounters a masked murderer. Henna, at the mercy of criminals, has to look death in the eye. Nurmi helps Karppi leave her doubts behind.
27	7	"Thumb Drive" (Muistitikku)	Rike Jokela	Kirsi Porkka	29 October 2021
Karppi receives new information about her deceased husband's past. The murder investigation takes Karppi and Nurmi on the trail of a family that has been through a lot. At the same time, the mystery related to the pharmaceutical company begins to unravel. Karppi realizes that Nurmi is in the killer's sights.
28	8	"The Ruins" (Rauniot)	Rike Jokela	Kirsi Porkka, Rike Jokela, Jari Olavi Rantala	29 October 2021
Karppi and Nurmi track the suspect to the ruins of an old monastery, but the murderer strikes first and forces Karppi to do desperate things. The final truth about Karppi's husband's death is revealed. Nurmi makes a decision about Leo.

== Production ==
The series was co-written by director Rike Jokela with Jari Olavi Rantala and Kirsi Porkka.

Deadwind is produced for Yle by Dionysos Films' Producers Riina Hyytiä and Pauliina Ståhlberg, and co-produced by the German company H&V Production.

== Release ==
Deadwind season 1 premiered in Finland in spring 2018 on Yle TV2 and in the autumn on Netflix. Season 2 was shown by Yleisradio and Netflix in 2020, and Season 3 aired from October 2021.

It was distributed by the French based About Premium Content.

== Reception ==
Season 1 of Deadwind received strong reviews and ratings in Finland after it aired on Yle TV2. It was compared to the Danish crime series The Killing and was nominated at the 2018 Nordisk Film & TV Fond Prize in the Best Nordic Screenplay category. Noel Murray of The Verge described the series as "realistically grim, but also offers the simple satisfaction of watching smart professionals bring some order to a chaotic world, one case at a time."

Bustle magazine's Rebecca Patton compared the show, for example, to the Danish-Swedish The Bridge series. She summarized, Deadwind is "just as compelling and addictive as its predecessors. After all, no one does brooding crime shows like the Scandinavians."

== See also ==
- Arctic Circle (TV series)
- Bordertown (Finnish TV series)
- Cinema of Finland
