= The Informer (2019 film) =

2019 British film directed by Andrea Di Stefano

- Theatrical release poster
- Directed by: Andrea Di Stefano
- Screenplay by: Matt Cook; Andrea Di Stefano; Rowan Joffé
- Based on: Three Seconds; 2009 book by Roslund/Hellström
- Produced by: Basil Iwanyk; Erica Lee; Mark Lane; Robert Jones; James Harris; Wayne Marc Godfrey
- Starring: Joel Kinnaman; Rosamund Pike; Common; Ana de Armas; Clive Owen
- Cinematography: Daniel Katz
- Edited by: Job ter Burg
- Music by: Brooke Blair; Will Blair
- Production companies: The Forest Road Company; The Fyzz Facility; Thunder Road Pictures; Ingenious Media; Endeavor Content
- Distributed by: Warner Bros. Pictures (United Kingdom); Redbox Entertainment; Vertical Entertainment (United States)
- Release date: 30 August 2019 (United Kingdom)
- Running time: 114 minutes
- Countries: United Kingdom; United States
- Language: English
- Budget: $60 million
- Box office: $2.9 million

The Informer is a 2019 crime thriller film directed by Andrea Di Stefano from a screenplay by Matt Cook, Rowan Joffé and Di Stefano, based on the novel Three Seconds by Roslund & Hellström. The film stars Joel Kinnaman, Rosamund Pike, Common, Ana de Armas and Clive Owen.

== Plot ==
Several years ago, Peter Koslow was released early from prison on condition that he work as an undercover informant for the FBI's New York City field office. Having worked his way into a Polish crime organisation, he is about to provide his handler, Special Agent Wilcox, with substantial evidence to indict crime boss Ryszard "The General" Klimek. Koslow has outfitted himself with a wire as he smuggles a large amount of fentanyl through the Polish consulate's office with the intention of it being delivered to the General. However, Koslow's cohort Staszek learns of a potential buyer and instead veers off-plan. Meeting with the buyer, Koslow quickly deduces that he is an undercover police officer. When tensions arise, the officer attempts to apprehend Koslow, but Staszek kills him. Listening to this over the wire, Koslow's handlers abandon him. Koslow and Staszek are brought before the General, and Koslow is told he will be required to return to prison in order to run the drug trade on the General's behalf. Initially reluctant, Koslow agrees after the lives of his wife and daughter are threatened.

Wilcox informs Koslow that he will continue to act as an informant while imprisoned, and in return he will be freed upon completion. Meanwhile, NYPD Detective Grens begins to investigate the murder of the undercover officer and suspects the Polish mafia. He obtains security camera recordings of Koslow leaving the scene and the FBI vehicle driving by. The General and his wife visit with Koslow and his wife, Sofia, in preparation for Koslow's return to prison. The following day, Koslow breaks his parole. Grens meets with Wilcox and Montgomery, who deny knowledge of the murder. He also speaks with Sofia, who refuses to divulge information about her husband. Meanwhile, Koslow begins his drug distribution but is thwarted by corrupt prison officer Slewitt who works for Smiley Phelps, the boss of the prison gang who holds sway over the drug trade. Koslow is nearly killed until he reveals to Smiley that he is an informant working to take down the General, Smiley's competition. Koslow calls Wilcox for help, but she is unable to help after being ordered by Montgomery to "burn" Koslow to cover up the FBI's involvement in the operation that led to the murder of the undercover police officer. Koslow then calls Sofia, asking her to give Grens the secret audio recordings he taped while speaking with Wilcox.

Wilcox reluctantly leaks to the General's attorney that Koslow is an FBI informant, and the General orders him and his family to be killed. Koslow is attacked and nearly killed by a Polish gangster but manages to subdue his assailant. In an act of desperation, he takes Slewitt hostage and renders him unconscious. Meanwhile, Wilcox confronts Sofia and takes possession of the tapes. At the prison, Montgomery has taken command of the hostage situation and Koslow, using his past experience as a US Special Forces sniper, enacts a means of escape when he switches outfits with Slewitt and strategically places a propane tank behind them, causing a sniper to mistakenly kill Slewitt and hit the tank, triggering a massive explosion. Staszek and another Polish gangster attempt to kill Koslow's family, but Grens arrives and thwarts them. Grens is shot but Sofia saves him and both gangsters are ultimately killed.

Koslow is transferred via ambulance and awakens to find that Wilcox is his escort. She allows Koslow to escape to make up for her part in what the FBI had done to him. In NYC, Wilcox confronts Montgomery and has him arrested after she wears a wire to record him threatening to kill Koslow to cover up his actions. Grens and Wilcox partner to help Koslow and protect his family, sending Koslow into hiding until the FBI investigation into the corruption is concluded and he can be a free man.

== Cast ==
- Joel Kinnaman as Peter Koslow
- Rosamund Pike as Erica Wilcox
- Common as Edward Grens
- Clive Owen as Keith Montgomery
- Ana de Armas as Sofia Koslow
- Eugene Lipinski as Ryszard "The General" Klimek
- Joanna Kaczyńska as Beata Klimek
- Edwin De La Renta as Smiley Phelps
- Ruth Bradley as Cat
- Sam Spruell as Slewitt
- Aylam Orian as Andrzej Dziedzic
- Karma Meyer as Anna Koslow
- Mateusz Kościukiewicz as Staszek Cusik
- Peter Parker Mensah as Officer Franklin
- Arturo Castro as Daniel Gomez
- Abdul-Ahad Patel as Vermin

== Production ==
The film adaptation of Three Seconds was announced at the Cannes Film Festival in 2017. Filming took place in the UK (in Pinewood Studios, Iver Heath and Gloucester Prison) and the US (in Brooklyn, New York) in 2017.

== Release ==
In September 2017, Aviron Pictures acquired US distribution rights to the film, while Warner Bros. handled British distribution rights to the film. The movie was originally scheduled to be released in 2018 but had multiple delays. It was released on 30 August 2019 in the UK and on 6 November 2020 in the United States.

Redbox Entertainment and Vertical Entertainment distributed the DVD and Blu-Ray in the United States on its Redbox kiosks on 18 December 2020.

== Reception ==
On review aggregator Rotten Tomatoes, the film has an approval rating of 64% based on 58 reviews, with an average rating of 5.8/10. The site's critics consensus reads: "The Informer may prove a passable diversion for less demanding thriller fans, but most of its ingredients have been recycled from superior entries in the genre." On Metacritic the film has a weighted average score of 61 out of 100, based on 12 critics, indicating "generally favorable reviews".

Peter Bradshaw of The Guardian gives the film 3 out of 5 stars, and wrote: "It might have made better sense as an episodic drama on television but it is brash and watchable, its world reeking with cynicism and fear." Tim Robey of The Telegraph gave the film 4 out of 5 stars, and wrote: "The Informer is one of the year's more pleasant genre surprises: a clenched fist of a crime thriller in the mode of The Departed or The Town, in which every element is just a notch smarter than you'd expect." Guy Lodge of Variety called it "a surprisingly well-oiled genre machine" and says it is a film "that knows its limits, and works tidily within them".
