= Mimosa Willamo =

Finnish actress (born 1994)

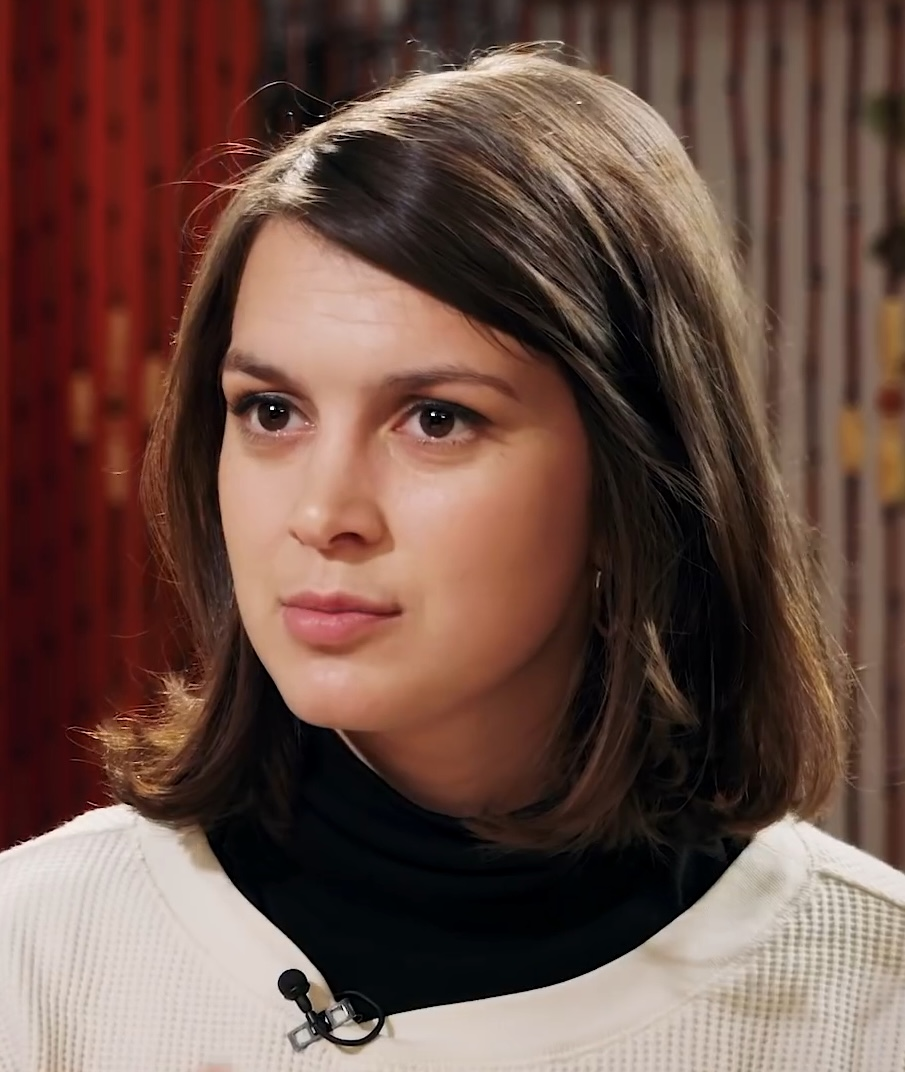
- Willamo in 2019
- Born: 9 November 1994 (age 31); Helsinki, Finland
- Occupation: Actress
- Years active: 2003–present

Mimosa Willamo (born 9 November 1994) is a Finnish actress known for her work in film and television. She has won two Jussi Awards: one for Best Leading Actress and one for Best Supporting Actress. Raised in Espoo, she did dubbing work as a child and presented for a YLE youth programme before making her feature film debut in Headfirst (2014), which earned her critical praise.

== Early life ==
William was born on 9 November 1994 in Helsinki, Finland. She was named after a character in Camilla Mickwitz's children's books. Second-born with four brothers, she had a working-class upbringing in Lähderanta, Northern Espoo. The home was bilingual as her father is a Finland-Swedish paediatric physiotherapist. Her mother, a teacher's aide, is half-Indian. As a youth, Willamo played instruments and did gymnastics.

== Career ==
She began dubbing work at eight years old; a father in the audience of a school event invited her to try it after seeing her perform on the recorder. Her first role was in the Finnish dub of Jesus & Josefine (2003), a Danish Christmas calendar series. She also lent her voice to several Astrid Lindgren adaptations such as voicing Stina for the Finnish version of Life on Seacrow Island, and dubbed in various other animated works. In 2010, she had a minor role as an elf girl on the comedy sketch show Marja Tyrnin Joulushow. The same year, she began co-presenting a YLE youth programme called Galaxi with her friend Robert Sundman. She credited the three-year hosting experience with helping build her confidence in front of a camera.

While attending Kallio Upper Secondary School of Performing Arts, she learned about the auditions for Antti Heikki Pesonen's comedy-drama film Headfirst through Wilma, the school's messaging system. She was selected, but there was a long hiatus before filming began, during which time she worked as an au pair in Luxembourg and attended a folk high school in Denmark. Headfirst premiered on 26 December 2014. Jouni Vikman of Episodi regarded Willamo as the highlight of the film, calling her "a true discovery [who] delivers one of the finest debuts in the annals of Finnish cinema". (Note: Finnish: todellinen löytö ja tekee yhden hienoimmista debyyteistä suomalaisen elokuvan aikakirjoissa) She later won Best Supporting Actress at the Jussi Awards for Headfirst.

In 2016, she appeared in Erinomanlaiset, an eight-part comedy series sponsored by the Anttila department store. She then had a lead role in Bodom, a horror film about a group of young people who go camping to reconstruct the Lake Bodom murders. Her character, Nora, was described by Dennis Harvey in Variety as "caustic" and "tomboyish". She won Best Actress at the Screamfest Horror Film Festival for Bodom. She played Amanda "Mandy" Gaynor in Born in Heinola (2016), an American exchange student who plays bass for the Finnish band Apulanta. She was then cast as Ca Bäck in Lola uppochner (2016), a Finland-Swedish thriller series based on Monika Fagerholm's novel of the same name. This marked her first acting role where she performed in Swedish. In 2017, she appeared in a psychological thriller web series Karma, the first Finnish drama programme to premiere on Instagram.

In Pamela Tola's Swingers (2018), she played Milla. She appeared in another web series, in HasBeen as Salla, a songwriter who wants to make music for herself. Malin Slotte of Hufvudstadsbladet wrote that Willamo "[stole] the show with her cool presence and dark charisma" (Note: Swedish: stjäl showen med sin coola närvaro och mörka karisma) The same year, Willamo began starring in the series Deadwind as Henna, the main protagonist's teenage stepdaughter who is involved with drugs. She played the titular role in Miia Tervo's debut feature film Aurora (2019), which opened the Gothenburg Film Festival. Willamo's performance was praised by critics. The film won seven Jussi awards; among them was Willamo's Jussi Award for Best Leading Actress. The same year, she and Josefine Fri starred in the web series Badrumsliv, as best friends Lo and Hilda who have just moved in together. The series takes place exclusively in their bathroom. Reviewing the series for Hufvudstadsbladet, Martina Moliis-Mellberg praised Willamo's portrayal of Lo's vulnerability.

Willamo appeared in Box 21 (2020), her first role in a non-Finnish production. In the Swedish series based on crime novels by Anders Roslund and Borge Hellström, she played one of the two main roles, police investigator Mariana Hermansson. The COVID-19 pandemic delayed projects across the industry, including several Willamo was involved with. In June 2021, the five-part Svenska Yle radio fantasy drama series Under sjön premiered, in which she played a 19-year-old girl named Ariel, whose life is upended when her boyfriend disappears. In Yellow Sulphur Sky (2021), she and Johanna af Schultén played the younger and older versions of Linda, respectively, in a film adaptation of Kjell Westö's novel of the same name. She reprised her role as Mariana Hermansson in Cell 8 (2022). She appeared in Memory of Water (2022), a sci-fi film based on Emmi Itäranta's novel of the same name about a dystopian future where the earth's water resources have been depleted.

In 2024, she competed on the second season of Amazing Race Suomi with her father Patrick; the duo finished as runners-up. She appeared in another Swedish series with a role in Gåsmamman. She played a police officer named Vera Waara in Murha Hangossa (2024), a thriller series set in Hanko based on detective novels by Matti Remes.

Willamo in 2026 at The Freyas (Nordic Film & TV Awards)

In 2025, she appeared in Yle Areena's audio drama Laskettua aika, playing a journalist tasked with covering the Russian invasion of Ukraine and locating a surrogate mother in Kyiv. Reviewing the ten-part series for Hufvudstadsbladet, Pia Ingström felt the production did not live up to its potential, offering only a superficial exploration of interesting topics like war journalism and commercial surrogacy. However, she regarded Willamo's performance as authentic. Next, Willamo was seen in Anna minun rakastaa enemmän (2025), a film based on Juha Itkonen's novel about a relationship between two musicians. She also made her debut as a stage actress at Teatteri Jurkka in Flamingonpunainen unelma alongside Tobias Zilliacus and Saga Sarkola. The production received positive reviews from Rakel Graffman of Hufvudstadsbladet and Tomas Jansson of YLE.

She starred in The Squirrel (2026) alongside Miro Lopperi. Reviewing the film for Karjalainen, Jussi Virratvuori praised her performance as Emilia, regarding it as nuanced, dynamic, and a welcome departure from her recent roles.

== Filmography ==
=== Film ===
Year	Title	Role	Notes	Ref.
2014	Headfirst	Tiina "Takku" Kurhinen		
2016	Born in Heinola	Amanda "Mandy" Gaynor		
2016	Bodom	Nora		
2018	Swingers	Milla		
2019	Aurora	Aurora		
2019	Somebody Should Do Something	Onerva		
2020	The Potato Venture			
2021	Yellow Sulphur Sky	Linda (younger)		
2021	Finders of the Lost Yacht	Liisa Hapula	Finnish: Pertsa ja Kilu	
2022	Memory of Water	Sanja		
2023	Sisu	Aino		
2025	Anna minun rakastaa enemmän	Elisa		
2026	The Squirrel	Emilia Vala		

=== Television ===
Year	Title	Role	Notes	Ref.
2003	Jesus & Josefine	Josefine (voice)	Main role	
2010	Marja Tyrnin Joulushow	Elf girl		
2016	Erinomanlaiset			
2016	Lola uppochner	Ca Bäck		
2017	Karma	Allu	Web series	
2018	Pirjo		Episode: "Kassalla"	
2018	Hulttiot	Nalletyttö	5 episodes	
2018–2019	HasBeen	Salla	Web series	
2018–2021	Deadwind	Henna Honkasuo	28 episodes	
2019	Aallonmurtaja	Olli	4 episodes	
2019	Badrumsliv	Lo	Web series	
2019–2021	Roba	Heidi Salonen		
2020	Box 21	Mariana Hermansson		
2020	Hotel Swan Helsinki	Alisa Valli	Episode: "Paljastuksia"	
2020	Paras vuosi ikinä	Anni	Episode: "Nuoruus on mielentila"	
2020	Kaikki huutaa Dingo!	Marika	11 episodes	
2020	Eristyksissä	Ronja	Episode: "Selftape"	
2020	Syke	Martina	4 episodes	
2021	Under sjön	Ariel	Audio drama	
2021	Karuselli			
2021	Modernit miehet	Oona	Episode: "Sepot"	
2022	Cell 8	Mariana Hermansson		
2023	Renki	Lilli	4 episodes	
2024	Murha Hangossa	Vera Waara		
2024	Amazing Race Suomi	Herself	Season 2	
2024	Gåsmamman			
2025	Laskettua aika	Nora	Audio drama	
2025	Healer	Roosa		

=== Theatre ===
Year	Title	Role	Venue	Notes	Ref.
2025	Flamingonpunainen unelma	Multiple	Teatteri Jurkka		

== Awards and nominations ==
Year	Award	Category	Work	Result	Ref.
2015	Jussi Awards	Best Supporting Actress	Headfirst	Won	
2016	Screamfest Horror Film Festival	Best Actress	Bodom	Won	
2017	Jussi Awards	Best Leading Actress	Bodom	Nominated	
2020	Jussi Awards	Best Leading Actress	Aurora	Won	
2025	Golden Venla	Best Supporting Actor	Healer	Nominated	
