= Nordic noir =

Genre of crime fiction originating from the Nordic countries

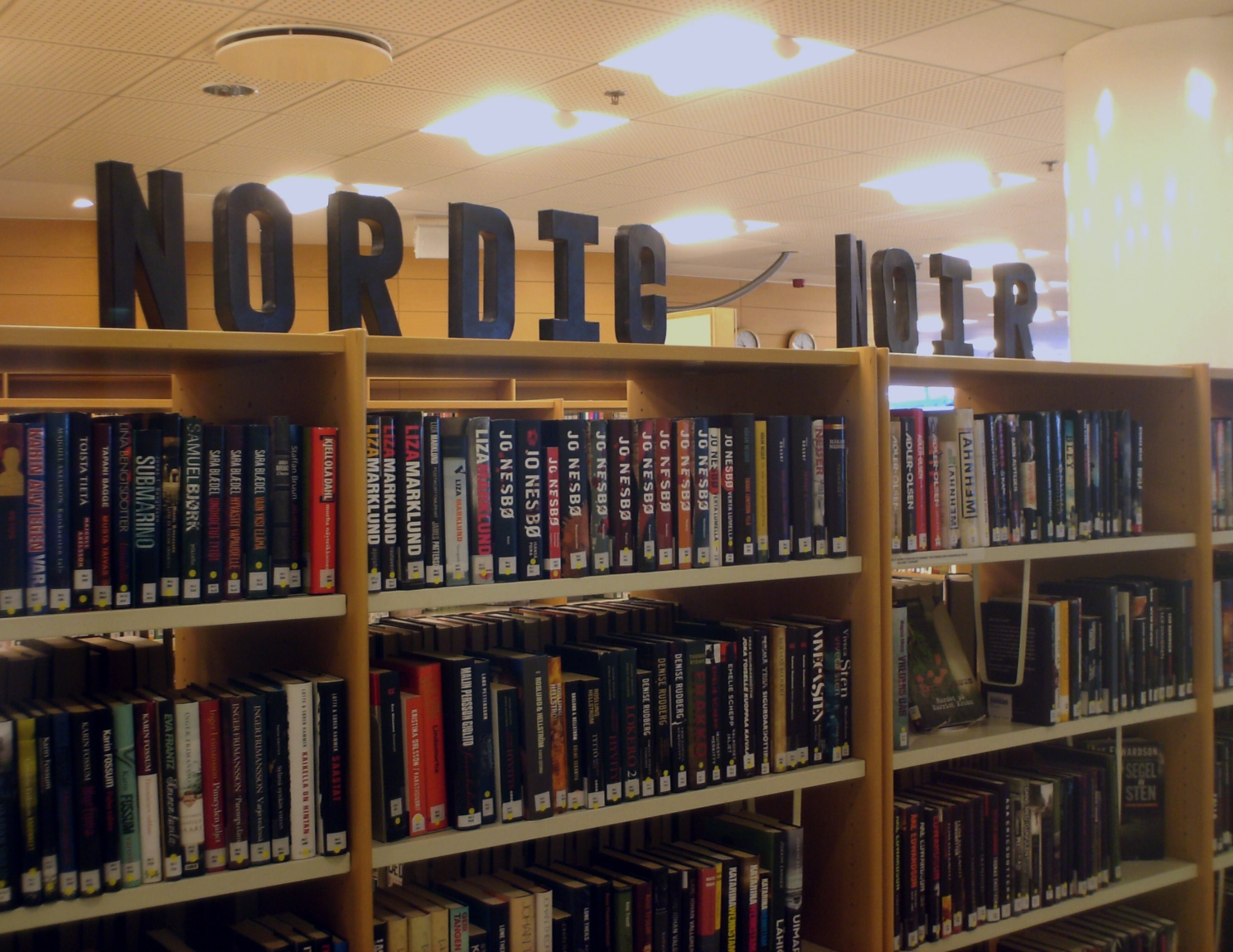
Nordic Noir in a Helsinki library

Nordic noir, also known as Scandinavian noir, is a genre of crime fiction usually written from a police point of view and set in Scandinavia or the Nordic countries. Nordic noir often employs plain language, avoiding metaphor, and is typically set in bleak landscapes. This results in a dark and morally complex mood, in which a tension is depicted between the apparently still and bland social surface and the patterns of murder, misogyny, rape, and racism the genre depicts as lying underneath.

Some of the best known Nordic noir authors are Jo Nesbø from Norway; Henning Mankell, Stieg Larsson and Camilla Läckberg from Sweden; Jussi Adler-Olsen from Denmark; and Arnaldur Indriðason from Iceland. The popularity of Nordic noir has extended to the screen, with TV-series such as The Killing, The Bridge, Trapped, and Bordertown. The styling of these series is also cited in several other non-Scandinavian TV shows, such as Wasteland and the Fargo TV series.

== Origins ==
There are differing views on the origins but most commentators agree that the genre had become well established as a literary genre by the 1990s; Swedish writer Henning Mankell, who has sometimes been referred to as "the father of Nordic noir", notes that the Martin Beck series of novels by Maj Sjöwall and Per Wahlöö "broke with the previous trends in crime fiction" and pioneered a new style: "They were influenced and inspired by the American writer Ed McBain. They realized that there was a huge unexplored territory in which crime novels could form the framework for stories containing social criticism." Kerstin Bergman notes that "what made Sjöwall and Wahlöö's novels stand out from previous crime fiction – and what made it so influential in the following decades – was, above all, the conscious inclusion of a critical perspective on Swedish society."

Henning Mankell's books on "Kurt Wallander" made the genre a mass phenomenon in the 1990s. Norwegian author Karin Fossum's books on "Inspector Sejer" were also highly influential and widely translated. British author Barry Forshaw suggested that Peter Høeg's atmospheric novel Miss Smilla's Feeling for Snow was "massively influential" as the true progenitor of the "Scandinavian New Wave" and, by setting its counter-intuitive heroine in Copenhagen and Greenland, that it inaugurated the current Scandinavian crime writing wave.

One critic opines, "Nordic crime fiction carries a more respectable cachet... than similar genre fiction produced in Britain or the US". Language, heroes and settings are three commonalities in the genre, which features plain, direct writing style without metaphor. The novels are often police procedural, focusing on the monotonous, day-to-day work of police, often involving the simultaneous investigation of several crimes. Examples especially include Henning Mankell's Kurt Wallander detective series, and Maj Sjöwall and Per Wahlöö's Martin Beck novels.

Until the 2010s, the genre had no particular name, but was sometimes referred to descriptively as "Nordic crime fiction" or "Scandinavian crime fiction". Within the Nordic countries themselves, this is still the case. The terms "Nordic noir" and "Scandinavian noir" are used largely interchangeably in English. In the English-speaking world, the term "Nordic noir" was coined by the Scandinavian Department at the University College of London and gained further usage in the British media in the 2010s beginning with the airing of the BBC documentary called the Nordic Noir: The Story of Scandinavian Crime Fiction. It is said that Stieg Larsson’s Millennium Trilogy contributed to the popularity of “Nordic noir” among readers outside Scandinavian countries. The Guardian also referred to The Killing as Nordic noir. These factors underscore that the term is considered typical of a phenomenon seen as uniting the viewpoint of foreign eye towards recognizable Nordic context. Nordic noir remains a foreign term, as it is not normally used in the Nordic countries and has no equally established equivalent in the Scandinavian or other languages of the Nordic countries.

== Features ==
Some critics attribute the genre's success to a distinctive and appealing style, "realistic, simple and precise... and stripped of unnecessary words". Their protagonists are typically morose detectives or ones worn down by cares and far from simply heroic. In this way, the protagonists' lives cast a light on the flaws of society, which are beyond the crime itself. This is associated with how this genre often tackles a murder mystery that is linked with several storylines and themes such as the investigation of the dark underbelly of modern society. This is demonstrated in the case of the Insomnia films, which featured crime-solving linked to the decline of the Nordic welfare state.

A description of Nordic noir cited that it is typified by a dimly lit aesthetic, matched by a slow and melancholic pace, as well as multi-layered storylines. It often features a mix of bleak naturalism and disconsolate locations, with a focus on the sense of place where bad things can happen. These were the distinguishing emotions of the series Bordertown, which were further combined with an atmosphere arising from the fear of Russia.

The works also owe something to Scandinavia's political system where the apparent equality, social justice, and liberalism of the Nordic model is seen to cover up dark secrets and hidden hatreds. Stieg Larsson's Millennium trilogy, for example, deals with misogyny and rape, while Henning Mankell's Faceless Killers focuses on Sweden's failure to integrate its immigrant population.

== Television ==
The term "nordic noir" is also applied to films and television series in this genre, both adaptations of novels and original screenplays. Notable examples are The Killing, The Bridge, Trapped, Bordertown, Deadwind and Lakeside Murders.

Critic Boyd Tonkin has suggested that the Scottish but heavily Scandinavian-influenced Shetland Isles and Outer Hebrides have produced authors in an allied, if not precisely identical tradition. Exponents include Ann Cleeves, whose Shetland books have been adapted for television, and Peter May's Lewis Trilogy. The relatively slower narrative pace of UK crime dramas Broadchurch, The Missing and River is also credited to a "Scandinavian noir" influence.

Subtitled original programmes have proven more popular with British audiences. International adaptations such as Sky Television's French/British The Tunnel (adapted from the Swedish/Danish The Bridge) have their own identity whilst retaining a stylistic and thematic affinity with the original series. While American cinema brought the English language movie version of The Girl With the Dragon Tattoo to a worldwide audience, receiving plaudits and was a box-office success, the American adaptations such as The Killing have fared less well critically and have proven less popular in terms of audience reaction than original productions, an example being the enduring interest in Arne Dahl's Intercrime series, originally titled The A Team, and its TV adaptations.

In February and March 2021 UK's BBC Four broadcast the Finnish psychological thriller Man in Room 301 (Finnish: "Huone 301").

== Authors ==
Authors who have contributed to the creation and establishment of this genre include:

=== Danish ===
- Jussi Adler-Olsen
- Leif Davidsen
- Peter Høeg

=== Faroese ===
- Jógvan Isaksen

=== Finnish ===
- Leena Lehtolainen
- Reijo Mäki
- Mikko Porvali
- Matti Rönkä

=== Icelandic ===
- Arnaldur Indriðason
- Yrsa Sigurðardóttir
- Ragnar Jónasson

=== Norwegian ===
- Alex Dahl
- Kjell Ola Dahl
- Thomas Enger
- Karin Fossum
- Anne Holt
- Jørn Lier Horst
- Ingar Johnsrud
- Hans Olav Lahlum
- Jo Nesbø
- Gunnar Staalesen
- Jørgen Brekke

=== Swedish ===
- Jan Arnald (Arne Dahl)
- Karin Alvtegen
- Majgull Axelsson
- Annika Bryn
- Christoffer Carlsson (writer)
- Åke Edwardson
- Kerstin Ekman
- Kjell Eriksson
- Börge Hellström
- Anna Jansson
- P. C. Jersild
- Mari Jungstedt
- Mons Kallentoft
- Robert Karjel
- Camilla Läckberg
- Jens Lapidus
- Stieg Larsson
- Åsa Larsson
- Göran Lundin
- Henning Mankell
- Liza Marklund
- Anders de la Motte
- Håkan Nesser
- Leif G. W. Persson
- Anders Roslund
- Carl-Johan Vallgren
- Maj Sjöwall and Per Wahlöö
- Johan Theorin
- Helene Tursten
- Lars Kepler

== See also ==
- Detective Varg series, lighthearted stories set in Sweden and described as "Scandi blanc"
