= Three Seconds =

2009 dark thriller novel by Roslund and Hellström

- Title page in original Swedish, Tre sekunder (2009)
- Author: Roslund/Hellström
- Genre: Crime
- Publisher: Piratförlaget (original)
- Publication date: 2009

Three Seconds (Swedish: Tre sekunder) is a dark thriller by the Swedish crime-writing team of Anders Roslund and Borge Hellström. First published in Sweden in 2009, it was translated into English in 2010. The novel deals with criminals in contemporary Sweden, the Police and Probation Officials who monitor these offenders, and the government who wants to use them as undercover operatives. Throughout, the story cross-cuts between characters, giving alternating points of view of Piet Hoffmann, a former criminal turned double agent; his handler, Erik Wilson; Ewert Grens, a determined detective whose efforts to solve a case threaten to expose Hoffmann; and officials from various agencies involved in Hoffmann's operation.

== Characters ==
=== Ewert Grens ===
Grens is a Detective Superintendent of the Stockholm Police, somewhere between 55 and 60 years old. Haunted by the death of his wife, for which he feels responsible, the grief-stricken Grens no longer takes care of himself or socializes with others. He survives on vending machine coffee and cakes; sleeps on the couch in his office; and knows his body and spirit are falling apart. When it comes to solving a crime, however, he digs in and won't let go, using his keen intelligence and well-honed instincts to arrive at the truth. He has never left a case unclosed, and is incorruptible. Grens is also the hero of four earlier novels by Roslund and Hellstöm—The Beast (2004), Box 21 (2005), Redemption (2006), and The Girl Below the Street (2007)—and two later, "Two Soldiers" (2012) and "Three Minutes" (2016).

=== Piet Hoffmann ===
Following his involvement with criminal activity, Piet Hoffman was coerced into working as an informant for the police. Despite his talent for high stakes undercover operations, he increasingly struggles to reconcile his dangerous professional life with his role as a husband and father. Now, he faces his most perilous assignment yet, viewing it as the final hurdle to securing a new identity and a safe future for his family.

=== Supporting characters ===
- Erik Wilson, Piet Hoffmann's handler, and, like Grens, a Detective Superintendent with the Swedish Police. He's very fond of Hoffman, and torn between loyalty to the operative he's meant to protect and obedience to the higher-ups willing to “burn” their agent.
- Lars Ågestam, the public prosecutor who will handle the case if Grens can provide enough evidence to go to court. Smooth and upper class, he rubs Grens the wrong way, and the two have a history of clashing.
- Sven Sundkvist. One of the detectives with the Stockholm police, he is Gren's closest colleague and assists him in gathering information. Sundkvist also appears in the rest of the Grens series.
- Marianna Hermansson, another detective who is a trusted member of Gren's team.
- Fredrik Göransson, Chief Superintendent of the Stockholm City Police and keeper of secrets. He is the first to figure out that Grens is getting too close to the truth.
- Zofia Hoffmann, Piet's wife and mother of his two sons. For most of the novel, Zofia remains unaware of her husband's job.
- Lennart Oscarsson, Chief Warden at Aspsås Prison, the most dangerous in all of Sweden.
- Martin Jacobson, Principal Officer at Aspsås Prison.

== Setting ==
Three Seconds unfolds primarily in the streets and apartments of Stockholm and in Aspsås Prison, a fictional jail located not too far outside the city. In addition, there are side trips to both Denmark and Poland.

== Film ==
The movie adaptation was announced at the Film Festival in Cannes 2017. It was made official that Rosamund Pike, Joel Kinnaman, Clive Owen and Common are all set to star in The Informer.

== Awards ==
- Awarded with Best Swedish Crime Novel 2009
- Awarded with the Japanese Readers Prize for "Best Crime, translated"
- Awarded with The CWA International Dagger for "Best International Novel of The Year"
- Awarded with "The Great Readers' Prize for Best Crime Novel of the Year"
- Shortlisted for The Glass Key 2009 for "Best Scandinavian Crime Novel of the Year"
- Awarded with The Platinum Pocket Award 2009 for "Outstanding Paperback Sales"
- Shortlisted for Barry Award for "Best British Novel of The Year"
