= Stockholm City (newspaper) =

Swedish newspaper, published 2002–2011

Stockholm City was a free daily newspaper published in Sweden.

== History and profile ==
Stockholm City was published from October 2002 to June 2011. The paper was mainly distributed in the Stockholm Metro and was a competitor with the other free newspaper in Stockholm, the Swedish Metro.

The City quickly became very successful and within half a year it was the third largest daily newspaper in Stockholm. The paper had a circulation of 294,600 copies in weekdays in 2005. It was approximately 601,000 copies in 2006.

== Contents/Sections ==
- Nyheter Stockholm (News Stockholm)
- Nyheter Sverige (News Sweden)
- Nyheter Världen (News World)
- Sport (Sports)
- Nöje och Livsstil (Entertainment)
- Kurs (Share Price)
- Trend/Jobb (Trend/Jobs)
- Resor (Travels)
- Cityshopping (Shopping guide)
- Mat och dryck (Food and drink)
- Motor
- Leva och må bra (Life and Health)
- Pryl och Teknik (High Tech)
- TV-tablå (TV guide)
