= Börge Hellström =

Swedish writer (1957–2017)

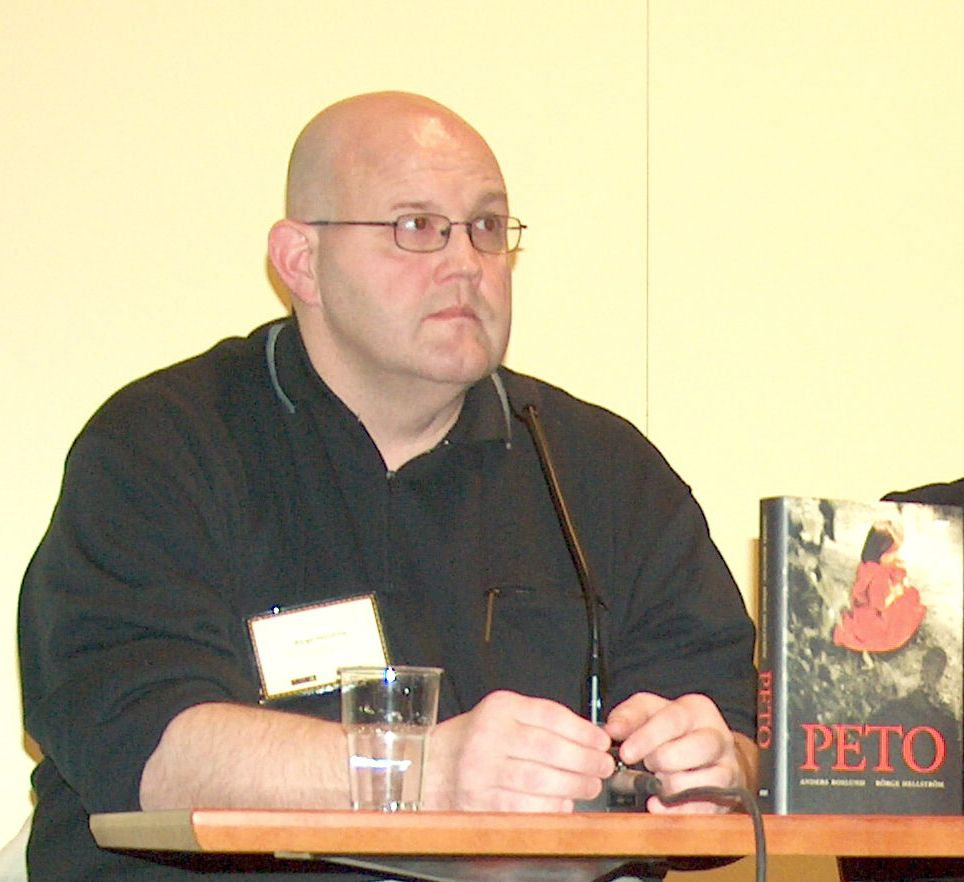
Hellström in Helsinki, October 2004

Börge Lennart Hellström (25 September 1957 – 17 February 2017) was a Swedish writer, one of the writing duo Roslund & Hellström.

== Biography ==
Börge Lennart Hellström was born on 25 September 1957. He was sexually abused as a child, and became a violent teenager.

He also became homophobic, and started gay-bashing, stealing cars, and taking illicit drugs, until he was arrested and put into jail. After an attempted suicide, he got treatment and opened up about the childhood abuse, which led to his reform.

Hellström became well-known as a founding member of the organisation Kriminellas revansch i samhället (KRIS). The organisation aims to combat crime and provide support to former criminals, including helping them to come off drugs.

He was also one half of the writing duo Roslund & Hellström. With journalist Anders Roslund (whom he met when Roslund was filming a documentary about KRIS), he co-authored seven books between 2004 and 2016.

Hellström lived in Värmdö Municipality. He died from cancer on 17 February 2017, at the age of 59, in Gustavsberg.
