= Aurora (2019 film) =

2019 Finnish film by Miia Tervo

- Promotional poster
- Directed by: Miia Tervo
- Written by: Miia Tervo
- Produced by: Mahsa Malka
- Starring: Mimosa Willamo; Amir Escandari
- Cinematography: Arsen Sarkisiants
- Edited by: Antti Reikko
- Production company: Dionysos Films
- Release dates: 25 January 2019 (GFF and Finland); 10 March 2019 (SXSW)
- Country: Finland
- Languages: Finnish; English; Farsi

Aurora is a 2019 Finnish romantic comedy drama film written and directed by Miia Tervo, in her feature film debut. Set in the Northern Finnish city of Rovaniemi, Mimosa Willamo stars as the titular character, a free-spirited nail technician in denial about her alcoholism. After a chance encounter, she agrees to help Darian (Amir Escandari), an Iranian asylum-seeker, find a wife so he can stay in Finland with his young daughter Azar (Elà Yildirim). Oona Airola, Miitta Sorvali, Ria Kataja, Chike Ohanwe, and Hannu-Pekka Björkman appear in supporting roles.

Filming took place in Rovaniemi and Helsinki from February to March 2018. It premiered at the Gothenburg Film Festival on 25 January 2019, with a simultaneous theatrical release in Finland and followed by its first North American screening at South by Southwest on 10 March. It was a box office success in Finland, becoming the 9th highest-grossing domestic film of the year. It received positive reviews from critics and won seven Jussi Awards, including Best Film. It was also nominated for the Nordic Council Film Prize and won Best International Feature Film at the Edinburgh International Film Festival.

== Plot ==
In Rovaniemi, Aurora works as a nail technician with her best friend Kinky and spends her free time partying and flitting between short-lived relationships, while also grieving her mother's death. After repossessors arrive to seize her alcoholic father's home (where she also lives), she considers possible money-making schemes, like giving colonics in Norway, but Kinky declines to join because of her boyfriend Joni.

In the same city, widowed Iranian asylum-seeker Darian struggles to accommodate his young daughter Azar at a chaotic refugee facility. A sympathetic employee, Tiina, takes them to her home. The new arrangement gets off to a rocky start, as Darian unintentionally offends her husband Juha by remarking on his mixed racial background. Desperate to stabilise Azar's situation, Darian thinks of killing himself in hopes of securing asylum for her. Tiina says he should find a Finnish wife instead.

To give Tiina and Juha privacy for their anniversary, Darian goes for a walk. He stops at a hot dog kiosk; he is short on money and an intoxicated Aurora covers the difference. Not enjoying her new living situation with Kinky, who has loud sex with Joni, Aurora finds temporary work supervising a cantankerous elderly woman named Liisa. Back at the salon, Kinky scolds Aurora for applying for a loan in her name to fund a move to Norway.

Aurora sees Darian again at the hot dog stand. He proposes marriage; when she laughs it off he offers her 3000 EUR if she will help find him a wife. She initially turns him down, but accepts after running into him again at the grocery store with Azar. The first date Aurora sets up for Darian is a disaster. Aurora enlists help from Darian with Liisa, who has volunteered to make hundreds of Karelian pasties for a party. Liisa, a refugee from Karelia, suggests a potential wife for Darian in Tuulikki, her lesbian friend. Tuulikki dies on the way to the ceremony. Darian goes on a series of unsuccessful dates set up by Aurora and begins to bond with Juha after a confrontation in the sauna.

Darian attends a party with Aurora and her friends. They kiss but are interrupted by the arrival of the police, who have found Liisa confused at a gas station because of Aurora's lack of supervision. Aurora and Darian argue and part ways. Tiina and Juha set up Darian with their acquaintance Ulla. Juha introduces Darian to winter swimming, while Aurora continues drinking heavily.

After Aurora's father is hospitalised, she seeks emotional support from Darian and they end up having sex. Darian and Azar celebrate Christmas with Tiina's family. Aurora blacks out partying; in her stupor she mistakenly sends a dick pic to Azar (which Darian intercepts before she can see). She wakes up in the hospital but denies she has a problem with alcohol. Wanting to make amends, she visits Darian with a stolen Christmas gift for Azar (a large fish plushie). Darian rebuffs her.

Immigration authorities interview Darian and Ulla together and separately about their upcoming marriage. Darian conveys his love for Aurora instead, meaning he and his daughter must pack up and try to find another country to accept them. Aurora decides not to leave Rovaniemi with Kinky and Joni, instead checking into rehabilitation. After getting sober, she sees Ulla at the grocery store and learns her marriage to Darian did not go through. Aurora reunites with Darian and Azar.

== Cast ==
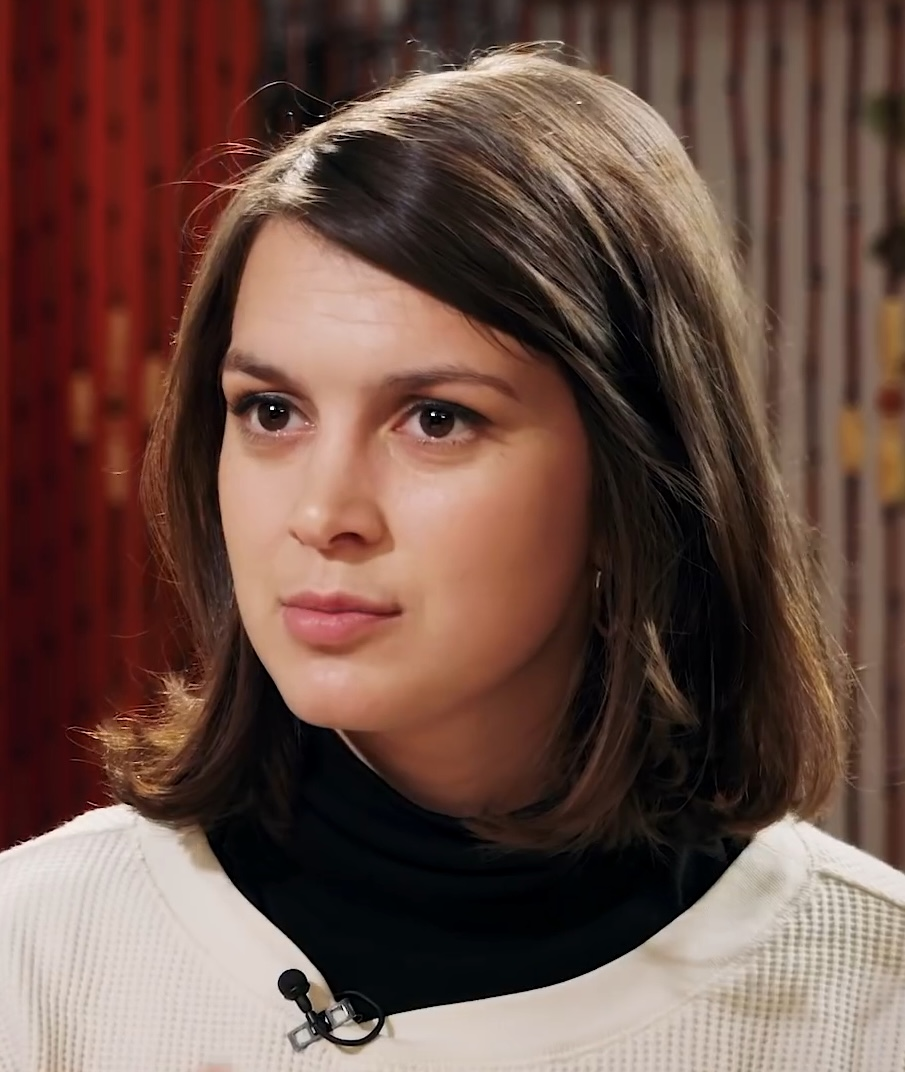
Mimosa Willamo played the titular main character, Aurora.

- Mimosa Willamo as Aurora: a nail technician living in Rovaniemi
- Amir Escandari as Darian: a widowed Iranian refugee seeking asylum in Finland; Azar's father
- Elà Yildirim as Azar: Darian's eight-year-old daughter
- Oona Airola as Kinky: Aurora's best friend and colleague at the nail salon
- Miitta Sorvali as Liisa: an elderly woman from Karelia who Aurora is hired to supervise
- Ria Kataja as Tiina: a physician who works at the refugee facility
- Chike Ohanwe as Juha: Tiina's husband
- Hannu-Pekka Björkman as Reijo: Aurora's alcoholic father
- Pamela Tola as Ulla: an earnest woman who Tiina and Juha set up with Darian

== Production ==
Miia Tervo described Aurora, her first feature film, as the result of multiple coincidences. Earlier during her university studies, she had made a documentary about substance abuse in young women. She wanted to develop a film about the topic too but was unable to secure funding. Then her cousin fell in love with an Iranian refugee she met by chance at a grocery store. Around the same time, producer Mahsa Malka—who had previously worked with Tervo on a short film—reached out to her with an unfinished screenplay, and so began development on Aurora. Tervo worked on the script for multiple years, beginning before public debate intensified with the 2015 European migrant crisis. During the writing process, she watched romantic comedies and female-centric films; she was particularly inspired by Toni Erdmann (2016) and its "unconventional and raw study of a modern, goofy woman."

Auditions were held to assemble the film's cast. Malla Kuuranne, a professor specialising in spoken expression, worked with the actors to help them perform in a convincing Rovaniemi dialect. Lead actress Mimosa Willamo, who grew up in Espoo, found the dialect a major challenge; in addition to working with Kuuranne she spent time listening to people speak in Rovaniemi's public places. It also marked Willamo's first time playing an adult character; she had previously played teenagers. In the main male role of Darian, Amir Escandari was selected. He was known as a filmmaker, particularly for the documentary Pixadores, and made his acting debut with Aurora. Filming took place from February to March 2018 and was done in two stages. Production began in Rovaniemi and continued for about three weeks. Then the production moved south to acquire some (primarily interior) shots in a Helsinki film studio. The total budget was 1.19 million EUR.

== Release ==
It premiered as the opening of the Gothenburg Film Festival on 25 January 2019. The same day, it was released in Finnish cinemas across 142 screens. It had its North American premiere at South by Southwest on 10 March. Over the course of the year, it was screened at 36 international film events including festivals. The film was also shown on Yle TV2 in 2021.

== Reception ==
=== Box office ===
Aurora was a box office success in Finland. Upon its theatrical release, it was the second-most watched film of its opening weekend, having been seen by nearly 10,000 people. In total, the Finnish Film Foundation reported 59,943 theatrical admissions for Aurora in 2019, generating 650,052 EUR in gross box office earnings. It ranked as the 9th highest-grossing Finnish film of the year. Aurora performed particularly well in Rovaniemi, where it was the second-most watched film of the year (behind Joker and ahead of Avengers: Endgame). It also reached the annual top-ten list in two other localities in Lapland: Kittilä and Utsjoki.

=== Critical response ===
Aurora received widespread critical praise, with several reviewers ranking it as among the best Finnish films of the year or the decade. Krister Uggeldahl of Hufvudstadsbladet wrote that it was the best Finnish film of 2019, deeming it "an endearing, utterly bonkers odyssey that tackles the admittedly tricky refugee issue without a trace of political correctness. It's all or nothing, with every spice in the rack and no seatbelt". (Note: Swedish: en kär och bindgalen odyssé som tacklar den erkänt knepiga flyktingproblematiken utan tillstymmelse till politisk korrekthet. Det är allt eller ingenting, med alla kryddor och utan säkerhetsbälte) Niko Ikonen of Episodi and Klas Fransberg of Vasabladet also felt it was one the year's best domestic films. A retrospective survey of film critics and journalists by YLE listed Aurora as the second-best Finnish film of the decade, after The Happiest Day in the Life of Olli Mäki (2016).

The film received 4/5 stars from Leena Virtanen in Helsingin Sanomat. It also received positive reviews from Alissa Simon in Variety and Niko Ikonen in Episodi. Willamo's performance was praised by multiple critics. Silja Sahlgren-Fodstad of Svenska Yle wrote that she "she truly [blossomed]" playing a character "strong and vulnerable, child and adult, wise and completely crazy. All at once, all the time." (Note: Swedish: slår hon verkligen ut i blom...stark och sårbar, barn och vuxen, klok och helgalen. Samtidigt och hela tiden.) Simon, who regarded it as a "go-for-broke performance" and Mick LaSalle of the San Francisco Chronicle suggested that Aurora could mark the start of an international career for Willamo. Both Virtanen and Simon found Escandari's acting debut as Darian compelling. Sahlgren-Fodstad was impressed by his portrayal of a desperate father, writing that he "[radiated] warmth without lacking sharpness." (Note: Swedish: utstrålar värme utan att för den skull sakna skärpa) Supporting actors also received critical notice. Virtanen wrote that Miitta Sorvali had delivered one of the best performances of her career and Simon felt Chike Ohanwe was "especially good". Hannu-Pekka Björkman's portrayal of Aurora's alcoholic father received praise from Uggeldahl and Virtanen, while Kemi felt the performance was overacted.

=== Accolades ===
Nominations for the year's Jussi Awards were announced on 22 January 2020. Aurora was nominated for 13 awards, making it the most nominated-film of the year. The ceremony was postponed due to the COVID-19 pandemic. The winners had already been chosen but had to remain secret until the rescheduled event at Kaapelitehdas on 14 October. Aurora won seven Jussis, including Best Film. With his win for Best Supporting Actor, Ohanwe became the first Black person to win a Jussi Award, which was highlighted as a historic moment in several Finnish news outlets. It was Finland's candidate for the Nordic Council Film Prize, with the jury motivation describing Aurora as "a warm story about the joys and pains of our time, serving as a welcome antidote to intellectual atrophy. Through its down-to-earth humanity and compassion, the film demonstrates, without moralizing, that equal human dignity also belongs to those who are struggling and broken, fighting for survival in the urban Nordic world." (Note: Finnish: ...sydämellinen tarina aikamme iloista ja kipukohdista, ja se toimii siten kunnon vastalääkkeenä älylliselle näivettymiselle. Elokuvan ruohonjuuritason inhimillisyys ja myötätunto osoittavat moralisoimatta sen, että yhtäläinen ihmisarvo kuuluu myös niille rikkinäisille, jotka käyvät eloonjäämistaistoa urbaanissa Pohjolassa) The prize ultimately went to the Danish film Queen of Hearts. It won Best International Feature Film at the Edinburgh International Film Festival.

Award	Category	Nominee(s)	Result	Ref.
Jussi Awards	Best Film	Mahsa Malka	Won	
Jussi Awards	Best Director	Miia Tervo	Won	
Jussi Awards	Best Screenplay	Miia Tervo	Won	
Jussi Awards	Best Leading Actress	Mimosa Willamo	Won	
Jussi Awards	Best Leading Actor	Amir Escandari	Nominated	
Jussi Awards	Best Supporting Actress	Miitta Sorvali	Won	
Jussi Awards	Best Supporting Actress	Oona Airola	Nominated	
Jussi Awards	Best Supporting Actor	Chike Ohanwe	Won	
Jussi Awards	Best Cinematography	Arsen Sarkisiants	Nominated	
Jussi Awards	Best Editing	Antti Reikko	Nominated	
Jussi Awards	Best Scenography	Kari Kankaanpää	Nominated	
Jussi Awards	Best Costume Design	Jouni Mervas	Won	
Jussi Awards	Best Makeup Design	Salla Yli-Luopa	Nominated	
Nordic Council	Film Prize	Aurora	Nominated	
Edinburgh International Film Festival	Best International Feature Film	Aurora	Won	
