= Alli Haapasalo =

Finnish film director and screenwriter (born 1977)

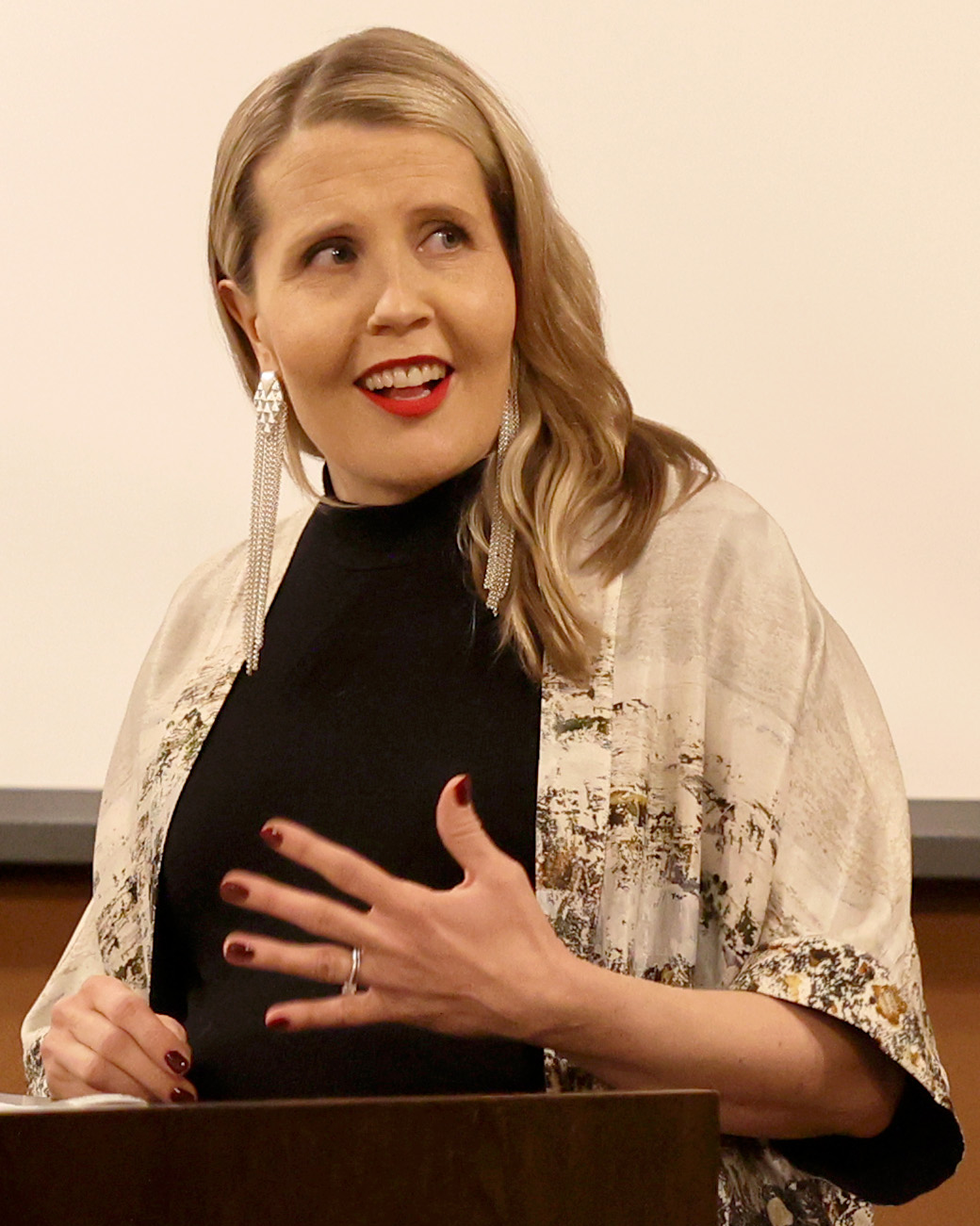
- Haapasalo in a 2022 interview
- Born: 3 October 1977 (age 48); Kerava, Finland
- Education: Aalto University; NYU Tisch
- Occupations: Director, writer
- Spouse: Christian Giordano (m. 2009)

Alli Haapasalo (born 3 October 1977) is a Finnish director and writer.

== Early life and education ==
Haapasalo was born in Kerava, a town near Helsinki, where she attended the Nikkari School. The daughter of lawyers, she was initially interested in journalism and documentaries and began her studies in information science at the University of Tampere in 1996. During her year studying abroad in Stockholm, Haapasalo decided she wanted to pursue a more creative field. She applied to Aalto University, graduating with a Bachelor of Arts in Film Studies in 2003. She then went on to graduate with a Master of Fine Arts from New York University Tisch School of the Arts in 2009.

== Career ==
Haapasalo first gained prominence through her thesis films, first the comedy short Ilona and later at Tisch the 60-minute long On Thin Ice, which had screenings at the 2009 Helsinki International Film Festival as well as the Brooklyn and Manhattan Film Festivals.

In 2015, Haapasalo returned to Finland when she was invited to direct and write the feature Love and Fury (2016). She collaborated with six other Finnish director-writers on the 2019 anthology film Force of Habit. The film was awarded Best Film in the International Competition at the 2020 Durban International Film Festival in South Africa and the Nordisk Film Award at the 2020 Jussi Awards. She also directed the Jarowskij Finland series Nyrkki.

Haapasalo directed the coming of age film Girl Picture from a screenplay by Ilona Ahti and Daniela Hakulinen. It premiered at the 2022 Sundance Film Festival in the United States where it received critical acclaim and won the Audience Award in the World Dramatic Competition. It was chosen for the 72nd Berlin International Film Festival's Generation selection.

== Personal life ==
Haapasalo lives in the Töölö neighbourhood of Helsinki with her American husband Christian Giordano and their children. They married in 2009, and Haapasalo became a naturalised U.S. citizen in 2014 before returning to Finland in 2015 for the more affordable cost of living.

== Bibliography ==
- Mondo matkaopas (New York) (2011)

== Filmography ==
=== Film ===
Year	Title	Director	Writer	Other	Notes
2001	Rakastaja	Yes	Yes		Short film
2011	Pääsykoe	Yes	Yes		Documentary
2003	Ilona	Yes	Yes		Short film
2005	Dear Mom, Love James	Yes	Yes	Producer, editor, cinematographer, sound	Documentary
2005	Breath	Yes	Co-writer	Producer, editor, sound	Short film
2006	The Appointment	Yes	Yes	Editor, sound	Short film
2009	On Thin Ice (Finnish: Kukkulan kuningas)	Yes	Yes		
2015	Hurricane, Brooklyn	Yes	Co-writer	Producer, editor	Short film
2016	Love and Fury (Finnish: Syysprinssi)	Yes	Yes		
2019	Force of Habit (Finnish: Tottumiskysymys)	Co-director	Co-writer		Anthology
2022	Girl Picture (Finnish: Tytöt tytöt tytöt)	Yes			
2026	Tell Everyone (Finnish: Kerro Kaikille)	Yes			

=== Television ===
Year	Title	Director	Writer	Other	Notes
2003	Tuntematon kaupunki II	Yes			Episode: "Kultalusikan kääntöpuoli"
2014	We Want More			Cinematographer	1 episode
2017	Presidentti			Helena	3 episodes
2019	Shadow Lines (Finnish: Nyrkki)	Yes			4 episodes
2021	At Home (Finnish: Eristyksissä)	Yes	Yes		Episode: "Doing the right thing"
