= Jarkko Lahti =

Finnish actor (born 1978)

Jarkko Lahti (born 1978 in Kokkola, Finland) is a Finnish actor, known for portraying Olli Mäki in the film The Happiest Day in the Life of Olli Mäki (2016). He won best Best Actor at the Jussi Awards in 2016. Lahti also appeared as Viirilä in the film The Unknown Soldier (2017).

In 2025, Lahti was cast to play Simo Häyhä in the upcoming Häyhä film.
