= Marjaana Maijala =

Finnish actress (born 1968)

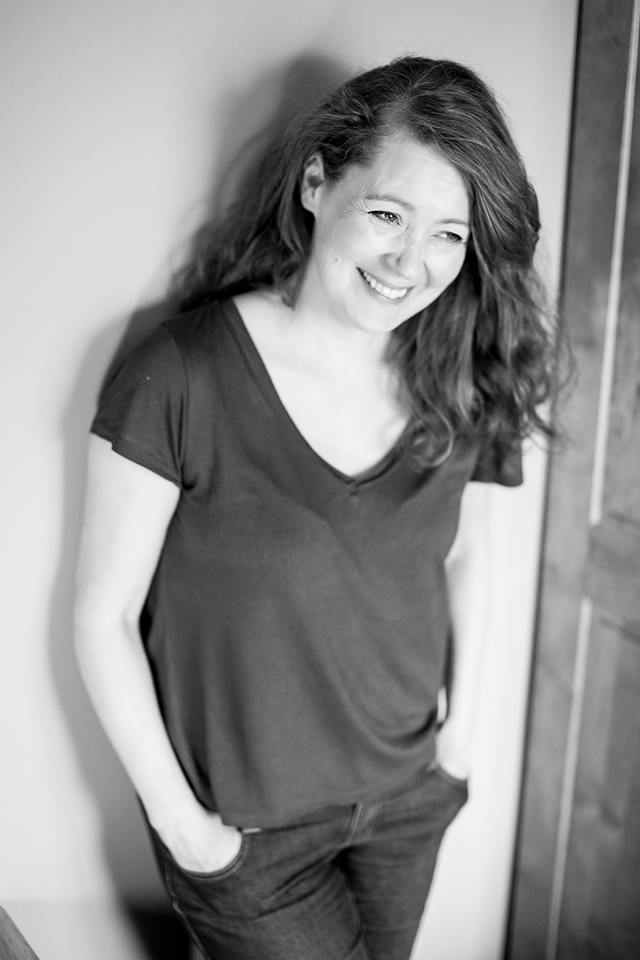
- Marjaana Maijala
- Born: 28 October 1968 (age 57); Lahti, Finland
- Occupation: actress
- Years active: 1994 – present

Marjaana Maijala (born 28 October 1968 in Lahti, Finland) is a Finnish actress, who has appeared in several feature films and television series. She has also performed in several Finnish theatres, including The National Theatre of Finland.

Maijala's first film role was in the 1994 film Kissan kuolema. Her breakthrough role was in the television series Pieni pala jumalaa (1999). She received the Venla Award for Best Actress in television for her performance. In the early 2000s she appeared in the Klaus Härö films Elina: As If I Wasn't There (2002) and Mother of Mine (2005). Her later filmography includes the television series Kotikatu and such films as Land of Hope (2018) and The Blind Man Who Did Not Want to See Titanic (2021).

Maijala graduated from the Helsinki Theatre Academy in 2000.

== Selected filmography ==
=== Films ===
Year	Film	Role
1994	Kissan kuolema	Annaleena
2001	Leijat Helsingin yllä	Nina
2002	Elina: As If I Wasn't There	Martta
2002	Rakkaus on aarre: Talo	Elisa
2005	Mother of Mine	Kirsti
2007	The Border	Mrs Peret
2008	Kolmistaan	Ritva
2011	Hella W	nanny
2011	Roskisprinssi	Lulu's mother
2011	Vares – Huhtikuun tytöt	Anne Airismaa
2013	Kekkonen tulee!	Maija Kellinsalmi
2014	Ei kiitos	Susa
2014	Ruotsalainen hetki	police
2017	Saattokeikka	doctor
2017	Yösyöttö	Anna Reponen
2018	Valmentaja	Minna
2018	Land of Hope	Ella
2019	Tarhapäivä	Anna Reponen
2021	The Blind Man Who Did Not Want to See Titanic	Sirpa

=== TV Series ===
Year	Series	Role
1995	Kotikatu	young woman
1999	Pieni pala jumalaa	Lilli
2002	Hovimäki	Katri Seppä
2002	Tappava säde	Jonna
2002	Tummien vesien tulkit	girl friend
2003	Tie Eedeniin	Kaisa
2003	Irtiottoja	Marjaana
2007	Lucia – A Christmas Story	Lucia, Lucia's mother
2009	Virginie	Marianne
2009	Savuna ilmaan	Jokinen
2010	Kotikatu	Harriet Talvela
2010	Jälkilämpö	Raisa
2010	Taivaan tulet	Taina
2015	Koukussa	Ilona
2016	Bordertown	Minttu Vesterinen
2017	Presidentti	Sari Puhakka
2017	Onnela	nurse
2018	Donna	Irene
2018	Deadwind	Maria
2018	Kummeli esittää: Kontio & Parma	Veronica
2019	Sipoon herttua	Saarikko
2019	Nyrkki	Edith
2020	Kakarat	
