= Land of Hope (film) =

2018 Finnish romantic drama film

- Promotional poster
- Finnish: Oma maa
- Directed by: Markku Pölönen
- Written by: Markku Pölönen; Antti Heikkinen
- Starring: Oona Airola; Konsta Laakso
- Production company: Solar Films
- Distributed by: Nordisk Film
- Release date: 2018
- Country: Finland
- Language: Finnish

Land of Hope (Finnish: Oma maa, lit. 'My own land'), also known as Age of Reason, is a 2018 Finnish romantic drama film directed by Markku Pölönen. It was written by Pölönen and Antti Heikkinen. Set between 1945 and 1952, the film centres on Anni Malmberg (Oona Airola), a wealthy woman who falls for Veikko Naskali (Konsta Laakso), a wounded veteran of the Continuation War. Anni's parents disapprove of the match, so the couple establish their own life in North Karelia. The film was nominated for two Jussi Awards and won both: Oona Airola won Best Actress and Antti Nikkinen won Best Set Design.

== Plot ==
Veikko is the lone survivor of a Continuation War ambush. Seriously wounded, he is sent to a convalescence facility for both soldiers and horses. Meanwhile, Anni, the daughter of a wealthy bakery owner, mourns her brother Aarne. She travels to a convalescent facility for wounded soldiers and horses to find her beloved horse, Liinu. The horse is traumatised by its wartime service and does not recognise her, leaving Anni distraught.

Veikko recuperates among other veterans; they discuss a government scheme granting land to wounded veterans on the condition that they marry. At home, Anni clashes with her father Kalevi, who has dismissed a pregnant war widow from the factory and refuses to let Anni run the company in place of Aarne.

Returning to the convalescent farm, Anni properly meets Veikko in the stables, where he is tending to Liinu, who served in his unit. Anni relays her mother cannot accept Aarne's death, and Veikko confirms he witnessed it. He kisses his cheek good-bye before leaving. At Christmas dinner, Kalevi attempts to match Anni with Putte, a business associate's son who avoided frontline service. Putte's tactless remark about the war distresses Ella, who runs outside and mistakes an approaching soldier for Aarne. The man turns out to be Veikko, whom Anni has secretly invited. He charms some of the family with blunt humour, and later, in the stable, Anni thanks him for bringing Liinu home and they share a kiss. She then visits him in his room during the night.

Ella cautions Anni against pursuing Veikko, arguing that love alone cannot sustain a marriage. Anni defends him and upsets Ella by insisting Aarne is truly dead. Her younger sister Hilkka realises that Anni has feelings for Veikko. Anni and Veiko begin a relationship, and he is soon introduced at the bakery, where Kalevi strongly disapproves. Veikko explains his plan to claim a government homestead, but Kalevi dismisses the scheme as a consolation prize and urges him not to ruin Anni's life. Anni overhears the discussion and insists on choosing Veikko. She leaves with him and Liinu for North Karelia, despite Kalevi declaring he will close her bank account.

Anni and Veikko marry in a simple civil ceremony, witnessed by Hilkka. Veikko gives Anni Aarne's old camera as a wedding gift. They travel to their allotted land, a remote forest plot donated by the widow Maire Luukkonen, and begin the arduous work of building a home. Their neighbour Vertii, initially threatening, ultimately offers help, and the local community assists them in clearing stumps off their land and constructing a hut. Despite moments of joy and freedom, the labour itself is punishing. Veikko's health deteriorates, and he collapses into a frozen stream. Anni rescues him and sees him off to the hospital. She subsists with meagre food during the winter while Veikko remains hospitalised. She is helped by the neighbours and receives gifts from Maire, a retired schoolteacher who sold the land Anni and Veikko reside on. While ice fishing, Anni meets Maire's son, Aatos, who gifts her a fish. Hilkka takes Kalevi's car to visit, taking Anni to see Veikko, who survives his operation. Kalevi visits the homestead to find his daughters hard at work. Veikko eventually returns home, and the hard work resumes.

At a village celebration, tensions with Aatos escalate, with him drunkenly confronting Veikko about wanting the land back and then groping Anni at a folk dance. More drunk men occupy Anni and Veikko's sauna, and after Veikko refuses to give him money, Aatos knocks over a lantern, which starts a fire that destroys their home. Devastated, Anni leaves without telling Veikko and returns to her parents. Kalevi at first offers conditional reconciliation, but Ella tells him to let Anni and Hilkka take over the business together. When surveyors threaten to revoke Veikko's land due to rumours of divorce with Anni, Vertii defends him and rebukes the men for disrespecting a war veteran.

Ella visits Veikko and realises the depth of the couple's commitment. After Veikko relays Anni has not answered any of his letters, she encourages him to try to talk to her again, this time in person. Reunited at the rebuilt homestead, Anni and Veikko argue but ultimately reconcile, deciding to stay together and continue their life on the land. In the future, Anni and Veikko take their children to a community film screening. Anni writes to Hilkka, reflecting that she and Veikko once felt differently about the land and its people, but now share the same sense of belonging and happiness.

== Cast ==
- Oona Airola as Anni Malmberg: a wealthy, headstrong young woman who leaves behind her wealthy family to marry a working-class, wounded veteran
- Konsta Laakso as Veikko Naskali: a wounded veteran of the Continuation War who previously worked in forestry; moves with Anni to North Karelia
- Helmi Linnosmaa as Hilkka: Anni's supportive younger sister with university aspirations
- Antti Virmavirta as Kalevi: Anni and Hilkka's father
- Marjaana Maijala as Ella: Anni and Hilkka's mother
- Hannu-Pekka Björkman as Kullervo
- Arto Heikkilä as Vertii Hiironen: Anni and Veikko's neighbour who moved to the land near theirs before the Winter War from Karelian Isthmus
- Marja Packalén as Maire Luukkonen: widowed former schoolteacher who sold land to the government that is later alotted to Anni and Veikko
- Mika Nuojua as Aatos: Maire's alcoholic son who is bitter about his mother selling the land without his permission

== Production ==
Filming was scheduled to begin in August 2017, and mostly took place in North Karelia. It was produced by Rimbo Salomaa, Markus Selin, and Jukka Helle at Solar Films.

== Release ==
The film had a theatrical release in Finland on 26 October 2018.

== Reception ==
With 29,907 viewers, it was the most-watched film in Finland the weekend of its release. The film was nominated for two Jussi Awards and won both: Oona Airola won Best Actress and Antti Nikkinen won Best Set Design.
