= The New Man (film) =

- Original Swedish film poster
- Directed by: Klaus Härö
- Starring: Julia Högberg; Maria Lundqvist; Lo Kauppi
- Music by: Michael Galasso
- Release date: 23 February 2007
- Running time: 104 minutes
- Countries: Sweden, Finland
- Language: Swedish

The New Man (Swedish: Den nya människan; Finnish: Uusi ihminen) is a 2007 Swedish-Finnish drama film directed by Klaus Härö.

== Plot ==
The film portrays Gertrude, a strong and exuberant 17-year-old and her collision with the Swedish welfare state in the early 1950s. It deals with the compulsory sterilisation in Sweden affecting 63,000 people between 1934 and 1976.

== Cast ==
- Julia Högberg - Gertrud
- Maria Lundqvist - Solbritt
- Lo Kauppi - Jenni
- Ellen Mattsson - Astrid
- Ann-Sofie Nurmi - Alba
- Christoffer Svensson - Axel
- Tobias Aspelin - Dr Berg
- Anna Littorin - Lisa
