= Oona Airola =

Finnish actress (born 1988)

- Airola in 2026
- Born: 13 July 1988 (age 38); Kokkola, Finland
- Education: Helsinki Theatre Academy
- Occupations: Actress; singer
- Children: 1
- Mother: Outi Airola
- Relatives: Anna Airola (sister); Aaro Airola (brother)
- Awards: Jussi Award for Best Actress (2018)

Oona Airola (born 13 July 1988) is a Finnish actress and singer. She has won two Jussi Awards for her film roles: Best Supporting Actress for The Happiest Day in the Life of Olli Mäki (2016) and Best Leading Actress for Land of Hope (2018). She also won the Dragon Award for Best Acting at the Gothenburg Film Festival for her performance in The Missile (2024). She has also had main roles in television series, including Hotel Swan Helsinki (2020–2021) and Helsinki Syndrome (2022–2024).

== Early life and education ==
She was born on 13 July 1988. She is from Kokkola, Finland. Her mother Outi Airola is a journalist, and she has four siblings, including fellow actress Anna Airola and musician Aaro Airola. Her father was a cellist. When she was eight years old, she sustained a serious leg injury while horseback riding. Her parents divorced when she was in high school. She studied at the Helsinki Theatre Academy after being accepted at the age of 22.

== Career ==
Airola made her feature film debut in Juho Kuosmanen's 2016 biographical drama The Happiest Day in the Life of Olli Mäki. She played Olli Mäki's girlfriend Raija, and won a Jussi Award for Best Supporting Actress for her performance. In February 2018, she played a member of the Female Red Guards at KOM-teatteri, in a production based on a novel by Anneli Kanto and directed by Lauri Maijala.

She won a Jussi for Best Leading Actress for Land of Hope (2018). In December, she appeared in the series Meidän pitää puhua. Each episode was based on a different break-up story submitted to Yle; Airola played all of the lead roles (a total of five different women). She played the protagonist's best friend Kinky in Aurora (2019). She was nominated for another Best Supporting Actress Jussi Award for Aurora. She released her debut single "Brahenkenttä" the same year. In January 2020, she played Cathy in a production of Humiseva harju at Helsinki City Theatre. She played Lena in a Helsinki City Theatre production of the Swedish musical Så som i himmelen, staged in Finnish as Niin kuin taivaassalen.

She played the lead role in the mystery series Hotel Swan Helsinki (2020–2021). In Makkari (2020), she and Johannes Holopainen played a couple named Venla and Jaakko, whose relationship was the focus of the second episode. She also appeared in Rahti (2021) as a human rights lawyer named Maria. Also in 2021, she and her sister Anna played twins on an outdoors excursion in the short film Souturetki. She had a supporting role in Girl Picture (2022), which had its international premiere at the Sundance Film Festival. In 2024, she won the Dragon Award for Best Acting at the Gothenburg Film Festival for her performance in The Missile. She played Maarit Hurmerinta in a 2024 Yle Radio audio drama. She played Kaija Koo in Kaunis rietas onnellinen (2026).

== Personal life ==
She has one child with Leo Sjöman (formerly Honkonen). They separated in 2025.

== Acting credits ==
=== Film ===
Year	Title	Role	Notes	Ref.
2016	The Happiest Day in the Life of Olli Mäki	Raija Jänkä		
2018	Land of Hope	Anni Malmberg		
2019	Aurora	Kinky		
2019	Dogs Don't Wear Pants	Satu		
2021	Souturetki	Kaisa	Short film	
2022	Girl Picture	Sanna		
2023	Four Little Adults	Enni		
2024	The Missile	Niina		
2026	Kalevala: The Story of Kullervo	Marjatta		
2026	Kaunis rietas onnellinen	Kaija Koo		
2026	Hetki ennen valoa	Leni		

=== Television ===
Year	Title	Role	Notes	Ref.
2018	Meidän pitää puhua	Multiple		
2020–2021	Hotel Swan Helsinki	Ella Kallio		
2020	Makkari	Venla		
2021	Rahti	Maria		
2021–present	Hautalehto	Jonna Holm		
2022–2024	Helsinki Syndrome	Hanna Raivio		
2022	Mobile 101	Vuokko Salminen		
2026	Hildur	Anna Virtanen		

=== Theatre ===
Year	Title	Role	Venue	Notes	Ref.
2010	Kauniiden unien joella		Kiasma Theatre		
2017	Tenorit liemessä		Helsinki City Theatre		
2018	Veriruusut	Maija Halminen	KOM-teatteri		
2020	Humiseva harju	Cathy	Helsinki City Theatre		
2021	Niin kuin taivaassalen	Lena	Helsinki City Theatre	Musical	
2024	Maarit – nälkää ja rakkautta	Maarit Hurmerinta	—N/a	Radio	

== Awards and nominations ==
Year	Award	Category	Work	Result	Ref.
2016	Jussi Awards	Best Supporting Actress	The Happiest Day in the Life of Olli Mäki	Won	
2018	Jussi Awards	Best Leading Actress	Land of Hope	Won	
2024	Dragon Award	Best Acting	The Missile	Won	
