= Elina: As If I Wasn't There =

2002 Swedish-Finnish film

- Directed by: Klaus Härö
- Based on: Som om jag inte fanns by Kerstin Johansson i Backe
- Starring: Natalie Minnevik; Bibi Andersson
- Distributed by: Sonet Film
- Release date: 2002
- Running time: 77 minutes
- Countries: Sweden; Finland
- Languages: Swedish; Finnish

Elina: As If I Wasn't There (Swedish: Elina - Som om jag inte fanns; Finnish: Näkymätön Elina, lit. 'Invisible Elina') is a 2002 film directed by Klaus Härö and based on a novel by Kerstin Johansson i Backe.

== Plot ==
In 1952, nine-year-old Elina lives with her mother and younger siblings and her mother in Norrbotten County, near the Finnish border. Her beloved father died of tuberculosis a few years ago. Elina finds consolation in wandering out on the dangerous marshlands to have imaginary conversations with him. Elina also contracted tuberculosis, but has recovered enough to return to school. However, since she missed so much schooling as a result, she has been put in a new class with a different teacher, the strict Tora Holm. Tora Holm sees it as her mission to protect her charges from the pitfalls of life, believing that only those who speak perfect Swedish have any chance of a happy and successful life. Elina's family belongs to a Finnish-speaking minority frowned upon by a staunch schoolmistress who starts hounding Elina for speaking Finnish in class and questioning her authority. Elina's mother, sister, and a liberal young male teacher all try to mediate the ensuing battle of wills between Elina and Miss Holm. Especially when Elina exercises the sense of justice she learned from her father and stands up for one of her schoolmates. Although nobody is willing to take her side, little Elina proves far stronger than teacher Tora Holm reckoned. The conflict comes to a head when Elina flees to the dangerous moor.

== Cast ==
- Natalie Minnevik as Elina
- Bibi Andersson as Tora Holm: the strict head teacher
- Henrik Rafaelsen as Einar Björk: the new teacher
- Marjaana Maijala as Marta: Elina's mother
- Peter Rogers as Anton: Elina's monolingual Finnish-speaking classmate
- Jarl Lindblad as Veikko Niemi
- Zorro Svärdendahl as Isak: Elina's father who died of tuberculosis
