= The Blind Man Who Did Not Want to See Titanic =

2021 Finnish film

- Directed by: Teemu Nikki
- Written by: Teemu Nikki
- Produced by: Teemu Nikki; Pasi Hakkio; Jani Pösö
- Starring: Petri Poikolainen; Marjaana Maijala
- Cinematography: Sari Aaltonen
- Production companies: It's Alive Films; Wacky Tie Films
- Release date: 8 September 2021 (VFF)
- Running time: 82 minutes
- Country: Finland
- Language: Finnish

The Blind Man Who Did Not Want to See Titanic (Finnish: Sokea mies, joka ei halunnut nähdä Titanicia) is a 2021 Finnish comedy-drama film directed by Teemu Nikki. It won the best feature film, best screenplay and best leading actor awards from the 2022 Beijing International Film Festival.

== Plot ==
Jaakko (Petri Poikolainen) has lost his sight and uses a wheelchair because he has multiple sclerosis. He has a long-distance girlfriend, Sirpa (Marjaana Maijala) who has cancer. When Jaako sets off alone to visit Sirpa he encounters various obstacles.

== Cast ==
- Petri Poikolainen as Jaakko
- Marjaana Maijala as Sirpa

== Reception ==
On the review aggregator website Rotten Tomatoes, 93% of 29 critics' reviews are positive. Metacritic, which uses a weighted average, assigned the film a score of 76 out of 100, based on 7 critics, indicating "generally favorable" reviews.
