= Rahti =

Finnish 2021 TV crime drama series

- Also known as: Cargo
- Genre: Crime drama
- Created by: Matti Kinnunen
- Screenplay by: Veikko Aaltonen; Johanna Hartikainen; Matti Kinnunen
- Directed by: Matti Kinnunen
- Starring: Evelyn Rasmussen Osazuwa; Johannes Holopainen; Alain Azerot; Oona Airola; Amos Brotherus; Yasmin Ahsanullah; Boodi Kabbani; Jalal Hajali
- Music by: Olli Huhtanen
- Country of origin: Finland
- Original languages: Finnish; English; Arabic; Italian
- No. of seasons: 1
- No. of episodes: 8

Production
- Producers: Rea Dominicy, Matti Kajander
- Running time: 45 min.
- Production company: FremantleMedia Finland

Original release
- Network: Yle TV1
- Release: 3 September 2021

Rahti (Cargo), is a Finnish eight-part crime drama television miniseries, which was broadcast on Yle TV1 from 3 September 2021. The series is based on an idea by Matti Kinnunen, who is also the director and a scriptwriter. It was co-written by Veikko Aaltonen and Johanna Hartikainen. Filming began in 2020 but was delayed due to the COVID-19 pandemic. Scenes were shot in Finland, Italy and Malta. Rahti was nominated for Nordisk Film & TV Fond Prize for best screenplay of a Nordic drama series.

The main protagonist, Kiki (Evelyn Rasmussen Osazuwa), is an Eritrean refugee, who is fleeing local soldiers. On her journey to Finland, where her father Sammy (Alain Azerot) lives, she is separated from her husband Aman (Geoffrey Erista) and daughter Liah (Ariela Francis). In Finland, Riku (Johannes Holopainen) steals Sammy's van without knowing it has a refugee family hidden inside.

== Cast ==
Sources:

- Evelyn Rasmussen Osazuwa as Kiki Selam: former Eritrean army staff sergeant, café owner; becomes a refugee
- Johannes Holopainen as Riku Railo: scrap yard owner, car thief
- Alain Azerot as Sammy: Kiki's father, Finnish resident, people smuggler
- Oona Airola as Maria Korpi-Heikkilä: Refugee Protection lawyer
- Amos Brotherus as Joni: Riku's younger brother, student
- Yasmin Ahsanullah as Bushra Hanano: Syrian refugee, mother, held by Riku
- Boodi Kabbani as Jawad Saleh: Bushra's husband, refugee, held by Riku
- Jalal Hajali as Kamal Hanano: Bushra's brother, Maria's interpreter
- Ona Huczkowski as Sarah: Aman's sister, army deserter, killed by soldier
- Geoffrey Erista as Aman: Kiki's husband, dies by drowning
- Ariela Francis as Liah / "Lilly": Kiki's four-year-old daughter, sold as Lilly by traffickers
- Rufaro Rwambiwa as Yonah: Sharif's henchman, Kiki's cousin, killed by Jorge
- Tommi Rantamäki as Petteri: Maria's husband
- Janette Hirvonen as Jenna: Joni's love interest
- Robin Kawa as Jorge: Sharif's henchman
- David Kozma as Sharif: human trafficking crime lord
- Ladwn Shakarchi as Rama Saleh: Bushra's daughter
- Luka Pajuhi as Rayan Saleh: Bushra's son, left by Riku at health centre,
- Emilia Neuvonen as Barbara: Yonah's girlfriend, works for Sharif
- David Leguesse as Samir

== Episodes ==
No. in season	Title	Directed by	Written by	Original release date
1	"Escape" (Pako)	Matti Kinnunen	Veikko Aaltonen, Johanna Hartikainen, Matti Kinnunen	3 September 2021
Kiki tidies kitchen, checks on Liah and lies alongside Aman. Sarah has deserted; she walks through Asmara, hiding from police. Kiki cashes Sammy's money order. At home, Kiki hides Sarah upstairs. Soldiers search for Sarah; confiscate passports. They depart after posting guard outside. Neighbour informs guard, who returns. Guard kills Sarah as she darts for door. Kiki disarms, knocks out guard. Kiki's family flee Asmara. While Sammy buys breakfast, Riku steals his van. Riku parks van in garage. Riku starts selling vehicle parts. Inside van, family yells for help. Joni "fixes" Jenna's car, after disabling it. Sharif scoffs at Sammy's accusation of stealing van. Aman drives family to border. Riku and Joni release family from van. Bushra asks for Sammy. Riku explains to Joni how he steals to pay bills. Sammy convinces CCTV-owner to display footage; sees Riku. Riku locks family in garage. Kiki's family arrive in Libya. Kiki phones Sammy but Riku answers. Bushra takes Sammy's phone, calls Kamal. Riku takes over phone, barters with Kamal for return of refugees. Sammy, posing as parts buyer, phones Riku obtains his address. Kiki's family are near Bayda. They get separated when crossing to boats. Aman's knocked out before Kiki can board.
2	"Catania" (Catania)	Matti Kinnunen	Veikko Aaltonen, Johanna Hartikainen, Matti Kinnunen	3 September 2021
Libyan smugglers abandon Kiki and others ashore. Kiki jumps on dinghy with fellow refugees. Riku berates Jawad and Bushra for damaging his garage door. They ask for Jayan to be treated by doctor. Jawad stabs Joni. They stop struggling as Sammy enters. Sammy sews Joni's wound. Riku leaves Jayan at refugee health clinic. Sammy requires his starter motor replaced. Maria and Kamal enter detention centre. Maria handles case of teen refugees. Sammy agrees to take Jawad to Sweden, while Bushra stays in garage. Kamal assists refugees' therapy session. Riku follows Sammy onto ferry. Riku and Sammy fight over money and Jawad. Joni brings Bushra and Rama into house. Bushra uses Joni's phone: asks Kamal to find Rayan. Kamal confirms that Rayan's seen by doctor. Kiki comes ashore at Catania. Amad and Liah arrive in mainland Italy; they board truck to cross central Europe. Sammy advises Kiki to wait in Catania. Yonah and Jorge cannot find Bushra at Riku's garage. Italian policeman threatens Kiki; she runs off, boards goods train. Ferry arrives in Stockholm. Jawad leaves ferry. Sammy collects two more refugees. Maria to become Rayan's legal guardian. When Aman wakes, Liah's already been offloaded. Sharif's gang collect refugees, including Liah.
3	"Agreement" (Sopimus)	Matti Kinnunen	Veikko Aaltonen, Johanna Hartikainen, Matti Kinnunen	3 September 2021
Jorge hands passports to Sharif. Yonah brings Liah home to Barbara. Riku and Sammy on return ferry. Riku reconnects with former lover, Matilda. Bushra changes fuse for Joni. Jorge and Yonah find no sign of Aman. In Milan, Kiki dines at passing stranger Carmela's home. Carmela's policeman son takes Kiki to airport. Refugee's son leaves Sammy's van. Police apprehend both refugees, look for Sammy. Sammy hires Riku to collect Kiki in Germany; Sammy gets arrested. Joni's late to dance practice with Jenna. Riku sees Bushra inside his home. Jenna and her friend Veera tend Joni's wound. Riku and Joni argue about Bushra. Riku calls Kamal to pick up Bushra. Teen refugee names Sharif for Kamal. Petteri has given up on adoption without discussing with Maria; they separate. Maria visits Rayan at hospital. In Sweden, Jawad meets his cousin Bilal. Riku explains to Kiki why Sammy could not collect her. Kamal asks Sharif for money to pay for Bushra. Sharif requires Kamal to house refugees in exchange. Riku drives Kiki toward Baltic Sea. Sammy orders his appointed lawyer Hannah to get him released. Sammy phones Yonah for assistance. Barbara tends Liah. Kiki drives off, stranding Riku. Aman's corpse washes ashore.
4	"On a Cruise Ferry" (Laivalla)	Matti Kinnunen	Veikko Aaltonen, Johanna Hartikainen, Matti Kinnunen	3 September 2021
Kiki allows Riku to drive once he describes Sammy's arrest for people smuggling. Riku tells Joni that he is in Germany. Jorge brings five refugees to Kamal's home. Maria becomes Rayan's guardian. Refugee robs Kamal's money. When rejected for a loan, Kamal's overly aggressive with bank teller. Jorge bashes robber, claims unspent money. Jawad and Bilal arrive at Riku's. Kamal informs Jawad that Riku wants money for Bushra. Joni hides in his room. Jawad and family leave with Bilal. Kiki reads online article covering Sammy's arrest. Sammy claims to police: helped two stranded people return to Finland; lawyer applies for bail. Kiki believes article's refugees were Aman and Liah; disbelieves Riku's correction. Kamal's boarders disturb building's residents. Kamal reunites with Bushra and family. Maria blocks Jawad collecting Rayan: he's too ill and she threatens to call police. Kiki applies for asylum in Finland. Barbara, posing as Liah's mother, takes Liah to Sweden. Doctor informs Maria that Rayan's kidneys are failing, requires kidney transplant. Maria updates Kamal on Rayan's health. Bushra and family return to Riku's home; Riku also arrives. Riku allows Bushra's family stay. Riku shows Joni their funds. Kiki visits Sammy in jail. Kiki realises Sammy's a people smuggler.
5	"Found on the Shore" (Löytynyt rannikolta)	Matti Kinnunen	Veikko Aaltonen, Johanna Hartikainen, Matti Kinnunen	3 September 2021
Yonah greets Kiki but lies about Sammy. Pastor gives Kiki keys to Sammy's apartment. Yonah recognises Liah from photo; he orders Barbara to stop sale. Joni tells Jenna he's unable to dance; she refuses other partners. Kamal takes Bushra to determine compatibility for kidney donation. As Jawad applied for Swedish asylum, he cannot attend. Maria and Petteri reconcile. Yonah and Jorge argue about selling Liah. Yonah allows Barbara to sell Liah. Kiki reports Aman and Liah missing. Liah's left with child seller and other children. Bushra's reunites with Rayan. Riku fixes hot water service. Jorge replaces Kamal's boarders with new ones. Riku visits Kiki to return Sammy's keys. Riku shows Kiki news report of drowned man. Yonah does not want Kiki to ask police about corpse. Riku drives Kiki to station; Kiki identifies Aman. Maria outlines long-term recovery for Rayan after surgery. Maria talks to Joni, who shows his stab wound. When asked by Kamal, Jawad refuses to approve Rayan's residency. Kiki collects Aman's watch and ring. Kamal's new boarder has panic attack. Yonah denies Sharif's group were involved in Aman's transport. Riku takes Kiki to where Aman's corpse was discovered. Child sellers photograph Liah for online catalogue.
6	"Lilly" (Lilly)	Matti Kinnunen	Veikko Aaltonen, Johanna Hartikainen, Matti Kinnunen	3 September 2021
Kiki, Yonah, Sammy attend Aman's funeral service. Liah scolded by child seller. Sammy promises to look for Liah upon release. Yonah lies to Sammy: Estonians took Liah. Joni refuses to report Jawad's attack. Kiki creates missing child poster for Liah. Kiki meets Maria, who assists looking for Liah. Yonah's worries to Barbara that Sammy will ask Sharif. He shows Barbara how children are sold online. Barbara advises Yonah to point Sammy at website. Maria describes child selling via darknet. Maria visits as Rayan recovers from surgery. Riku gets Joni to access darknet. Sammy's released, Yonah gives him codes to website. Sammy takes Riku's laptop, Yonah accesses child seller's website: finds "Lilly". Kiki registers as interested buyer. Jawad prepares meal, visits Rayan and Bushra. Riku greets Matilda and her family. Joni and Jenna reconnect. Kamal's summonsed by police to explain his finances. He orders Jorge to remove his boarders. One boarder runs off, Jorge and Yonah subdue him. Police arrive, Jorge and Yonah run off. Police arrest Kamal. Kiki's ashamed that Sammy's money provided her better life from people smuggling. Riku improves his business; Joni continues studying. Child sellers want €50,000 for "Lilly" but Kiki lacks funds, Sammy provides advance of 5,000.
7	"Total Cost of 50,000 Euros" (Maksua vastaan)	Matti Kinnunen	Veikko Aaltonen, Johanna Hartikainen, Matti Kinnunen	3 September 2021
Kamal injures himself. Sammy realises Yonah lied about Sharif's gang not transporting Aman and Liah. Held at gunpoint by Sammy, Sharif blames Jorge for hiding Liah. Police arrive at Sharif's business; Sammy escapes, Barbara and Sammy arrested. Kiki updates Riku. Sammy claims he cannot find Yonah. Kiki berates Sammy for not telling her about Yonah's involvement. Kiki directs Sammy to deposit 5,000 in Riku's account to pay advance. Maria learns of Kamal's arrest. She convinces Bushra to help Kamal, leaving Rayan to recover. Barbara return home, explains to Yonah and Jorge about being arrested and Sharif bashed by Sammy. Pastor tells Sammy he's fired. Maria returns Bushra to Jawad. Joni explains to Jenna why he does not want to report Jawad as any investigation could implicate Riku. Riku transfers advance. Kamal's psychiatrist phones Maria, who denies knowing Bushra's whereabouts. Social worker begin process of taking over Rayan's custody. Bushra rails against authorities. Kamal explains housing refugees for Bushra's expenses. Maria on leave from work. Riku informs Joni he's selling their home. Jenna offers Joni to move in with her. Maria brings Rayan home; claims he was abandoned. Riku visits his drunken father Juhani. Swedish couple offer €60,000 for "Lilly".
8	"Towards the Unknown" (Kohti tuntematonta)	Matti Kinnunen	Veikko Aaltonen, Johanna Hartikainen, Matti Kinnunen	3 September 2021
Juhani signs away his share of Riku's yard. Jorge has Yonah arrange meeting with Sammy. Bushra learns that Joni did not inform police of Jawad's stabbing. Maria describes to Petteri how they are Rayan's foster parents. Riku gives his €45,000 to Kiki to buy "Lilly". Sammy meets Yonah, who claims he did not know it was Liah. Jorge shoots Sammy and Yonah; Jorge drives off. Yonah dies. Kiki gets message: "Lilly" already sold. Maria takes Rayan to pharmacy for buy medications. Bushra explains to Petteri how Rayan was taken away. Kiki despairs of finding Liah. Sammy phones Riku to meet him. Sammy gives Liah's address and asks Riku to take Kiki there. Jenna and Joni help Bushra and Jawad understand Rayan's legal situation. Maria plays with Rayan. Petteri describes meeting Rayan's parents. Riku splits funds with Joni before leaving for Sweden. Kamal sentenced to three years imprisonment, but he escapes. Maria returns Rayan to Bushra and family. Kiki and Riku recover Liah; Riku notices other children. Child seller calls for thugs. Kiki holds gun on child seller and thugs. Makes child seller phone police to come. Joni leaves with Jenna. Sammy phones Riku from ambulance, learns Liah reunited with Kiki.

== Reception ==
Variety's John Hopewell described Cargo as "compelling, edge-of-the-seat series charting the desperate plight of illegal immigrants, in line with other taut social issue thrillers". Leena Reikko of Kulttuuritoimitus observed that Rahti, whilst well-made, did not address vital issues about human trafficking: "Some [criminals] move these people, some direct the cargoes that carry them. Who? They are not the guys who, in ports, shove those who have bought their voyages into unseaworthy vessels. Nor are the cargoes controlled by a long chain of petty criminals who get their own crumbs from this tray. However, someone is controlling this, and some are profiting from it."
