= Girl Picture =

- Film poster
- Finnish: Tytöt tytöt tytöt
- Directed by: Alli Haapasalo
- Screenplay by: Ilona Ahti; Daniela Hakulinen
- Produced by: Leila Lyytikäinen; Elina Pohjola
- Starring: Aamu Milonoff; Eleonoora Kauhanen; Linnea Leino
- Cinematography: Jarmo Kiuru
- Edited by: Samu Heikkilä
- Production company: Citizen Jane Productions
- Distributed by: Nordisk Film; LevelK
- Release dates: 24 January 2022 (Sundance); 14 April 2022 (Finland)
- Running time: 101 minutes
- Country: Finland
- Languages: Finnish, French

Girl Picture (Finnish: Tytöt tytöt tytöt, lit. 'girls girls girls') is a 2022 Finnish coming-of-age film directed by Alli Haapasalo from a screenplay by Ilona Ahti and Daniela Hakulinen. It premiered at the 2022 Sundance Film Festival where it won the Audience Award in the World Dramatic Competition. It was released in Finland on 14 April 2022.

== Plot ==
3 young girls at the cusp of womanhood, Mimmi, Rönkkö and Emma, try to defy the persistent winter darkness in Finland by trying to draw their own contours. In the process, they move between dreams, reality, friendship and relationships, and try to make sense of the whole mess. In 3 consecutive Fridays, 2 of them experience the earth moving effects of falling in love, while the third goes on a quest to find something she's never experienced before: pleasure.

== Cast ==
- Aamu Milonoff as Mimmi
- Eleonoora Kauhanen as Rönkkö
- Linnea Leino as Emma
- Sonya Lindfors as Tanja
- Cécile Orblin as Karoliina
- Oona Airola as Sanna
- Mikko Kauppila as Jarmo
- Amos Brotherus as Sipi
- Bruno Baer as Kalle
- Nicky Laaguid as Henkka
- Oksana Lommi as Frida
- Yasmin Najjar as Sonja
- Elias Westerberg as Allu
- Pietu Wikström as Samuli
- Fathi Ahmed as Otto
- Pablo Ounaskari as Roope
- Rebekka Kuukka as Saana
- Tuuli Heinonen as Poliisi
- Yassin Ei Sayed as Lionel
- Lauri Nousiainen as Petri
- Henrikki Haavisto as Vesa

== Production ==
Principal photography took place in 2021.

== Reception ==
On Rotten Tomatoes the film has a 99% rating based on 73 reviews, with an average rating of 7.6/10. The critics consensus reads: "Sensitively written and beautifully acted, Girl Picture captures the whirlwind of teenage emotions without sacrificing narrative maturity and depth." On Metacritic, the film holds a weighted average score of 78 out of 100, based on 17 critics, indicating "generally favorable reviews".

== See also ==
- List of submissions to the 95th Academy Awards for Best International Feature Film
- List of Finnish submissions for the Academy Award for Best International Feature Film
