= Presidentti =

- Title card of the series
- Written by: Kirsti Manninen; Antti Pesonen
- Directed by: Lauri Nurkse
- Country of origin: Finland
- No. of seasons: 1
- No. of episodes: 12

Production
- Production company: Zodiak Finland

Original release
- Network: Yle TV1
- Release: 5 February – 23 April 2017

Presidentti (Finnish: “The President”) is a Finnish political drama series that was broadcast on Yle TV1 from 5 February to 23 April 2017. The series was directed by Lauri Nurkse, written by Kirsti Manninen and Antti Pesonen, and produced by Zodiak Finland.

== Plot ==
In 2018, successful businessman Henri Talvio, nominee of a party called Liike (“Movement”), is elected President of Finland. While in office, he faces severe crises both in politics and in his private life.

== Cast ==
- Samuli Edelmann as Henri Talvio, President of the Republic
- Laura Malmivaara as Anna Talvio, spouse of the President
- Inka Kallén as Petra Pennanen, Prime Minister
- Tommi Eronen as Arto Rahikainen, communications manager of the President
- Antti Virmavirta as Pentti Sirelius, state secretary of the Prime Minister
- Rea Mauranen as Marjatta Kuusisto, chief of staff of the President
- Mikko Leppilampi as Jani Eronen, consultant of energy industry and lover of the Prime Minister
- Joel Mäkinen as Elias Talvio, chair of the Liike and son of the President
- Mats Långbacka as Erik Bergholm, Minister for Foreign Affairs
- Kristiina Halttu as Camilla Bergholm, spouse of the Minister of Foreign Affairs
- Esko Salminen as Väinö Vallgren, media proprietor and owner of the Saldo magazine
- Samuli Niittymäki as Riku Lehtinen, editor-in-chief of the Saldo magazine
- Iida-Maria Heinonen as Iines, assistant of the President
- Iida Lampela as Mai, assistant of the President
- Olavi Uusivirta as Kalle Kivijärvi, Minister of Finance and chair of the Environment Party
- Marjaana Maijala as Sari Puhakka, editor-in-chief of Yle Uutiset
- Lotta Lindroos as Annika Pitkänen, vice chair of the Liike

== Episodes ==
Number	Episode name	English translation	Air date
1	Välitön ja salainen	Immediate and secret	5 February 2017
2	Vilpittömästi ja uskollisesti	Sincerely and faithfully	12 February 2017
3	Valtakunnan ensimmäinen nainen	The first lady of the realm	19 February 2017
4	Tsaarin kuriirit	Couriers of the Tsar	16 February 2017
5	Hengenvaara	Danger of death	5 March 2017
6	Kultaranta	Kultaranta ("The Golden Beach")	12 March 2017
7	Silmänkääntötemppu	A conjuring trick	19 March 2017
8	Järistyspiste	The epicenter	26 March 2017
9	Likaista vettä	Dirty water	2 April 2017
10	Helsinki Summit	Helsinki Summit	9 April 2017
11	Kansakunnan etu	The interests of the people	16 April 2017
12	Itsenäisyyspäivä	Independence Day	23 April 2017
