= Helsinki Syndrome (TV series) =

Finnish television drama series

- Also known as: Helsinki-syndrooma
- Genre: Crime, drama
- Created by: Miikko Oikkonen
- Written by: Miikko Oikkonen; Olli Suitiala; Tuomas Hakola; Olli Koivula; Ninni Saajola; Juha Siitonen
- Directed by: Lenka Hellstedt; Marko Mäkilaakso; Juuso Syrjä
- Starring: Peter Franzén; Oona Airola; Taneli Mäkelä; Laura Malmivaara; Antti Luusuaniemi; Tuulia Eloranta
- Music by: Brian Batz, Kaspar Kaae
- Country of origin: Finland
- Original languages: Finnish, English
- No. of seasons: 2
- No. of episodes: 14

Production
- Running time: 47–54 min.
- Production companies: Beta Film, Fisher King

Original release
- Network: Yle TV1
- Release: 2 September 2022 – 21 November 2024

Helsinki Syndrome (Finnish: Helsinki-syndrooma) is a Finnish television crime and drama series that began broadcasting on 2 September 2022 on Yle TV1. It was created by Miikko Oikkonen, who co-wrote the screenplay with Olli Suitiala, Tuomas Hakola, and Olli Koivula. The series was directed by Juuso Syrjä, Lenka Hellstedt, and Marko Mäkilaakso.

The first season of eight episodes is set in the early 2020s and begins in a newspaper office where electrician Elias (played by Peter Franzén) is holding journalist Hanna (Oona Airola) and her colleagues hostage while negotiator Jarmo (Taneli Mäkelä) attempts to resolve the situation. Elias is a victim of the 1990s Finnish banking crisis and wants the journalists to determine who is responsible for the predicament of long-term debtors like himself.

A second season of six episodes began broadcasting on 21 November 2024. Franzén, Mäkelä and Airola reprise their roles, with the action set two months later. Elias is now a fugitive, Jarmo is hunting him, and Hanna is investigating an illegal government directive to courts in the mid-1990s to absolve banks for causing long-term debt.

== Plot summary ==
In 1992, 18-year-old Elias became guarantor for his father Pekka on a loan approved by local bank manager Matti. However, Pekka was declared bankrupt the next year during the 1990s Finnish banking crisis. Over subsequent years the family was unable to clear the debt, leading Pekka to commit suicide in 2008 and leaving Elias bankrupt and unable to secure loans for his businesses. During the COVID-19 pandemic in the early 2020s Elias still does not qualify for subsidies, despite government promises. He decides to force Helsingin Sanomat's journalists to investigate who is responsible for similar long-term debtors' problems.

Elias disrupts power and internet access in the newspaper's newsroom and sets bombs at the doors. He holds four hostages – Hanna, Gusse, Anne, and Eve – at gunpoint, getting them to sift through bank, court, and news records. Outside the bank, negotiator Jarmo is attached to police commander Hakkarainen and criminal investigator Tapani. Elias allows Hanna to go outside so she can search the court archives of Pekka's case, where she finds bank manager Matti's evidence has been deleted from written and audio court records. Hanna wants to print the story, but chief editor Susanna follows lawyers' advice to acquire more evidence before publishing.

Gusse's health deteriorates as days pass without his diabetes medication. Tapani discovers where Elias has practised making bombs and shooting guns, indicating that he had assistance and resulting in a search for Elias's schoolfriend and former soldier Lauri. Elias and Lauri track Matti, who is expecting a major payment which has been delayed. Without informing Jarmo, Hakkarainen tries to isolate Elias by cutting the electric power in the building, which also blocks Internet access and prevents Elias from opening doors or contacting Lauri. Lauri proceeds with Elias' plan to capture the State Treasury director Elina's partner Sami, thereby forcing Elina to accept a German loan transfer. Gusse is retrieved by paramedics while having diabetic shock and later dies. The loan transfer of €2.2 billion is diverted to various long-term debtors' accounts, with €0.5 billion unaccounted for. Hanna determines that Elias has lied and that the court document's missing page was a fabrication. Police eventually storm the newsroom, retrieving Anne and Eve, but Elias escapes.

Three months later Elias is hiding out in a lakeside cabin. Through the long-term debtors network he arranges for his sons Johannes and Santeri to visit, giving them a USB drive containing a video message in case he is captured or ill. Jarmo and Tapani trail Elias to the cabin and Tapani informs Hanna that they are about to capture Elias. Armed police break into the cabin but Elias has left an hour earlier. Hanna's superiors want to substantiate a recording of the 1992 Koivisto Conclave, where government officials authorise courts to exonerate banks when they create long-term debtors. In exchange for the NBI's verification of the recording, Hanna allows Tapani to see Elias' interview.

Elias is assisted by twin hackers Pollux and Castor, who devise a computer virus while NBI chief Ortamo orders Jarmo to concentrate on tracking Treasury heist money to long-term debtors' accounts. Tapani deduces Elias' location but Elias escapes again, albeit after being scalded. Elias, Pollux, and Castor introduce the virus into the Bank of Finland's computer and siphon off €23 billion. Hanna prints her Conclave article and the media speculate on charges. After talking with Hanna, Elias surrenders to Jarmo and is imprisoned, later being hospitalised with sepsis. Elias' new lawyer Isoniemi believes no bank, court, or government official will be prosecuted.

== Cast and characters ==
=== Main cast ===
- Peter Franzén as Elias Kristian Karo: 48-year-old electrician, long-term debtor
- Oona Airola as Hanna Sofia Raivio: Helsingin Sanomat journalist, widowed during COVID pandemic
- Taneli Mäkelä as Jarmo Kiiski: NBI negotiator, Julia's father
- Laura Malmivaara as Anne Kaarina Laukko: crime news editor, in charge of newsroom
- Tuulia Eloranta as Eveliina "Eve" Iida Hannele Puolakka: intern journalist
- Piitu Uski as Susanna Simonen: newspaper's chief editor, Anne and Hanna's boss
- Antti Luusuaniemi as Tapani Kolehmainen: criminal investigator, works for Jarmo and Hakkarainen
- Mari Rantasila as Minna Karo née Grundholm: Elias' wife, Johannes and Santeri's mother
- Jakob Öhrman as Lauri Aleksi Ristiniemi: born 1979, former soldier with post-traumatic stress disorder, Elias' school friend
- Eero Saarinen as Harri "Gusse" Antero Gustafsson: senior journalist, wrote numerous pro-bank articles, diabetic
- Marketta Tikkanen as "Pollux" a.k.a. Camila Braga: computer hacker, "Castor"'s twin
- Tuomas Nilsson as "Castor": computer hacker, "Pollux"' twin

=== Recurring cast ===
- Pelle Heikkilä as Klaus Arpola: journalist, leaves newsroom before hostages taken
- Juha Kukkonen as Tutkinnanjohtaja (English: "chief investigator") Ortamo: NBI's chief investigator, Jarmo and Tapani's boss
- Aatos Mäki as Johannes Karo: Elias and Minna's older son, becomes disgruntled with shortcomings of long-term debtors
- Daniel Viljanen as Santeri Karo: Elias and Minna's younger son
- Kris Gummerus as Ilkka Nieminen: Interior Ministry secretary, security department
- Pihla Maalismaa as Julia Sofia Kiiski: Jarmo's daughter, medicated for Tourette's, often stops taking medications, later joins anti-government protestors
- Esa-Matti Long as Matti Puronen: former SKOP's bank branch manager, approved loan to Karo family, later State Treasury director
- Rea Mauranen as Liisa Koskinen: Elias' defence lawyer, later semi-retired
- Juho Orpana as Poliisiteknikko (English: "police technician") Peitepoliisi (English: "undercover police")
- Robert Enckell as Pekka Antero Karo: Elias' father (1949–2008), accepts bank loan
- Jaana Joensuu as Sisäministeri (English: "Interior Minister"): Ilkka's boss (Season 1)
- Saara Ikonen as Sisäministeri: Ilkka's boss (Season 2)
- Max Bremer as Esa Puolakka: long-term debtor, becomes alcoholic, Eve's estranged father
- Niina Nurminen as Kaisa Grundholm: Minna's sister

=== Season one only ===
- Turkka Mastomäki as Kenttäjohtaja (English: "field director") Hakkarainen: police commander
- Katariina Havukainen as Poliisiteknikko (English: "police technician") Mäkelä: assists Jarmo and Hakkarainen
- Tiina Weckström as Ritva Malmi: county court archivist, ran long-term debtors support group
- Cecilia Paul as Elina Vanninen: state treasury director, Sami's partner

=== Season two only ===
- Martin Bahne as Kenttäjohtaja (English: "field director") Heikkinen: police commander
- Jukka Voutilainen as Juhani Koskelo: 1992 Koivisto Conclave attendee
- Tomi Alatalo as Matti Isoniemi: lawyer, represents Julia and Elias
- Jussi Lehtonen as Hammaslääkäri (English: "dentist") Ristelä: treats Lauri
- Hannes Suominen as Valkohattuhakkeri (English: "whitehat hacker"): assists Jarmo tracking Castor and Pollux
- Panu Vauhkonen as Pankin IT-mies (English: "bank's IT chap") Laine: uploads hard drive update into bank's computer
- Timo Jurkka as Jaakko Sallinen: long-term debtor, boatman

== Production ==
Helsinki Syndrome (Helsinki-syndrooma) was announced in April 2021 as a joint production between Beta Film and Fisher King, with Peter Franzén signed on as lead actor. In the early 2010s the show's creator Miikko Oikkonen, had read stories of over-indebted families due to the 1990s Finnish banking crisis. Oikkonen considered a documentary but Yle TV1 wanted a fictional drama inspired by those events, which became Helsinki Syndrome. Oikkonen's parents had become long-term unemployed during that crisis, and his father having worked in the electrical industry inspired Franzén's character of Elias.

Filming of the series began in June 2021. Besides Helsinki, the first season's locations included Hyvinkää, Nurmijärvi, Hiidenranta in Vihti, and Hiidenpirtti in Lohja. Buildings in Pusula, Lohja were used for the Salo bank branch, Pikka Karo's home, and Liisa Koskinen's premises, set in Turku. The second season used an old lime and cement factory in Virkkala, Lohja, and locations in Sipoo.

== Episode guide ==
=== Season one ===
.

No. overall	No. in season	Title	Directed by	Written by	Original release date
1	1	"Saturday" (Lauantai)	Juuso Syrjä	Miikko Oikkonen	2 September 2022
"Helsingin Sanomat"'s editorial office receives mystery boxes when Elias enters and booby-traps the doors. He holds Hanna, Gusse, Anne, and Eve hostage at gunpoint. Elias gives journalist Hanna a file on his company showing that although debts normally expire in five years his debt never expired despite government promises, plus he has found evidence of illegal activity by banks. The receptionist contacts police who discover blocked access to higher floors. When the hostages complain, Elias threatens to shoot Anne. Flashback to September: Elias practises using a gun, disarming his friend and former soldier Lauri. Present: Hanna asks Elias to explain how his debt occurred. Flashback to 1992: Elias and his parents meet bank manager Matti. Elias's father Pekka wants a 2 million business loan. Matti increases the loan to four million and Elias goes guarantor. But Pekka is later declared bankrupt and cannot get a job. Present: Due to his debt, Elias is disqualified from loans. Police enlist NBI negotiator Jarmo's assistance and snipers set up nearby. 2008: Pekka suicides. Present: The police phone Elias's wife Minna, who cannot reach Elias. Police send up a drone and Elias discovers journalist Gusse is diabetic. Chief investigator Ortamo updates his superiors.
2	2	"Sunday" (Sunnuntai)	Lenka Hellstedt	Olli Suitiala, Miikko Oikkonen	2 September 2022
Elias destroys Gusse's insulin and releases Hanna with a GPS ankle bracelet. She's to return within 10 hours with trial transcript's missing page and medication. Forensics discover phosgene in Elias' samples. Jarmo interviews Hanna, who describes Elias and the hostages. Gusse tells Eve that the Finnish markka was devalued 50% in 1991, beginning the financial crisis. Elias inserts an IV drip into Gusse's arm, but it’s only glucose. 2020: Lauri teaches Elias how to use IV and tells him to control Gusse as he knows powerbrokers. Present: Jarmo cannot allow Hanna back, so she meets her editor Susanna and explains Elias' story. However Susanna cannot publish a criminal's case, but does publish the hostage story. Elias tells Jarmo that Gusse has no insulin and the situation is desperate. 1993: Elias dates Minna. Present: Minna tells Tapani that Elias made bad decisions but was betrayed by authorities. Hanna accesses files with pages missing and district court case tape with Matti's evidence missing. Tapani checks Elias' barn and finds circuit boards. Hanna arrives at the newspaper with only 15 minutes left for Gusse, while media arrive at Elias' home. Matti tells Hanna that lawyers advised his response. Elias orders Hanna to return, now.
3	3	"Monday" (Maanantai)	Lenka Hellstedt	Olli Suitiala, Miikko Oikkonen, Olli Koivula	2 September 2022
Gusse collapses on the floor as Hanna begins writing Elias' story but Susanna reminds Hanna that lawyers will require better verification. Next morning: Police abseil into building and approach the newsroom. Elias self-injects adrenaline and videotapes a public call for help to expose banks' corruption. 1994: Elias and Pekka meet the long-term debtors and discover the bank invented collateral after the loans were approved. Elias and Minna meet Matti, who was directed to approve overextended loans by bosses, which saved Finland's finances. Present: Elias' former workers praise his business practices and Hakkarainen overrules Jarmo's objection against Hanna's return since it will be an opportunity to neutralise Elias. Police occupy the neighbouring room and pass a camera through the wall. Elias asks Gusse who could have hidden the banks' corruption and Lauri follows Matti. Susanna will not publish so Hanna leaks the information to a rival journalist. Jarmo suggests swapping Hanna for Gusse and Elias agrees to have Gusse medicated after Hanna returns. Escorted by police, Hanna approaches the newsroom and Jarmo is informed that armed police will force entry because Elias practised with explosives and wears gas mask. Jarmo orders the withdrawal of the armed police.
4	4	"Tuesday" (Tiistaipäivä)	Marko Mäkilaakso	Tuomas Hakola, Miikko Oikkonen	2 September 2022
The police and Hanna are removed. News reports show links between 1990s financial crisis and 2020s COVID response. Elias asks if the Interior Ministry is involved? Jarmo rails at Hakkarainen for attacking during negotiation. Lauri enters a flat and uses a keypass to access a laptop while Elias wakes Eve and ties her to a chair. Jarmo looks at drone vision and Tapani discovers Elias had help. Elias supplies Gusse his medication, discovering he wrote stories supporting bankers. Judge Tarja tells Hanna that the government directed courts to support the banks in creating long-term debtors. Elias leaves via an access vent after telling Jarmo everyone is resting. Kaisa arrives with supplies while Elias accesses the newspaper's server, accessing Matti's files. Elias phones county court archivist Ritva, saying Hanna will visit and give her files. Ritva explains that the banks targeted firms with saleable assets and that the court ignored Matti's testimony. Ritva puts the documents in the bank's lockers while Jarmo learns his daughter Julia hurt herself and was sent to hospital. Lauri tells Elias that Matti's leaving town and asks "do we continue"? Hakkarainen alerts the police as Elias disconnects from the server and is seen by the police.
5	5	"Tuesday Evening" (Tiistai-ilta)	Marko Mäkilaakso	Olli Koivula, Miikko Oikkonen	2 September 2022
When police ask for his ID, Elias disarms the officer and escapes being shot. He re-enters the news room, sees armed police, and points his gun at Eve. Elias phones police but Jarmo's resting. Elias won’t speak to anyone else. News report: police order public to stay away. Eve’s estranged father Esa drives a truck out of a yard. 2020: Elias talks Matti into atoning for ruining people's lives. Present: Ritva shows a safe deposit box to Hanna, who recovers the trial transcript's missing page. Hanna phones Susanna and verifies Elias' story. Matti allows Lauri inside but doesn’t know why the payment's delayed. Security Minister Ilkka pressures the police to isolate Elias, but they stall. Tapani identifies Lauri from footage of Elias' purchases and tells Jarmo he will find Lauri. Jarmo visits Julia in hospital. Lauri realises there are three possible names on the payment schedule. Esa talks with protesters while the police plan to isolate Elias by shutting off all power. The newspaper's lawyer advises caution about printing story and the editorial board vote against printing. Esa sees a photo of Elias with a gun. He re-enters his truck and drives toward the building. The police shoot Esa dead.
6	6	"Wednesday" (Keskiviikko)	Marko Mäkilaakso	Olli Suitiala, Miikko Oikkonen	2 September 2022
Gusse is spasming and Hanna's story is unpublished. Eve gives bottled water to Gusse and Jarmo returns to the communications caravan with Julia. The police have Elias isolated, and Jarmo asks Elias to release Gusse. Elias requests Internet access in return and paramedics retrieve Gusse. 2020: Elias and Lauri plan stealing a payment and Elias prints trial's file with page included. Present: Jarmo believes Elias is being helped by others and Hanna reveals Elias' case involves government directives. Elias tells Eve the situation's beyond control as truck drivers approach the protest site. At Lauri's flat, Tapani finds bullets and a handgun, and orders a police alert. Lauri researches Treasury secretary Elina and photographs her partner Sami. Gusse tells Tapani that Elias used different SIMs and is interested in Matti and State Treasury. Trucks blockade the protest site as Klaus and Julia help Hanna search national archives' microfilms. Jarmo asks Elias to release hostages now the story's written, but Elias puts batteries in the bombs' timers. These last about five days and cannot be switched off without the Internet. Julia discovers Elias' case file and Hanna finds the relevant page, which differs from Ritva's copy. Elias has tricked them.
7	7	"Thursday" (Torstai)	Juuso Syrjä	Tuomas Hakola, Miikko Oikkonen	2 September 2022
Tapani finds Lauri's car as the army arrive at the newspaper building to end the situation by force. Jarmo quits because Elias and the hostages may die. Hanna asks Jarmo if she can visit Elias but he tells her the army is now in charge. Gusse has died and the police ask Jarmo to return, who tells them to reconnect the Internet and track Elias. Lauri takes Sami at gunpoint to his car as Jarmo allows Hanna entry to the building, where power has been reconnected. Elias tells Eve to contact Lauri and emails are sent. Hanna confronts Elias that he lied about the missing page. Elias apologises for lying and for Gusse's death, but doesn’t release the hostages. Lauri ties Sami to a bomb and takes a photo. Lauri shows Elina the photo and orders her to confirm the bank account number. Power returns and Minna tells the police to do what needs doing. The police and army enter. Elias takes his watch off as Matti confirms the account number. Jarmo hears explosions and smoke fills the newsroom. Armed forces wearing gas masks ascend the stairs. Outside, protesters attack riot police. Inside, the police find Anne and Eve.
8	8	"Long Weekend" (Pitkä viikonloppu)	Juuso Syrjä	Miikko Oikkonen	2 September 2022
Protesters are pepper sprayed as Elias leads Hanna down the service stairs. Police evacuate Anne and Eve while Elias evades searching patrols. Tapani's squad catch Lauri but Elias escapes via a manhole, motorbike, and car. Elias phones Lauri but Jarmo answers and Elias asks him to tell Lauri he’s sorry. Hanna explains to the news team that a German bank approved a 2.2 billion euro loan to Finland but the money went to fictitious accounts, unknown to Treasury. Elias meets Ritva and they drive off while Jarmo directs Tapani to round up Elias' known helpers. Ritva's car passes police roadblocks minutes before the police are alerted. Elina tells Jarmo about the German money transferred into thirty different accounts. The police stop Ritva but Elias has escaped with a boatman. Tapani arrests Ritva but Hanna’s article is published, and Susanna tells her it is her best article in years. Victims of the financial collapse receive deposits from an unknown source. Elias walks through a forest to a cabin as Jarmo is appointed head of a team to find him. Hanna receives a recording of a 1990s presidential conclave absolving the banks from their deliberate bankrupting of businesses.

=== Season two ===
No. overall	No. in season	Title	Directed by	Written by	Original release date
9	1	"Week 1" (Viikko 1)	Juuso Syrjä	Miikko Oikkonen, Ninni Saajola	21 November 2024
Boatman Jaako brings Elias’ sons Johannes and Santeri to Elias’ hideout as NBI investigates the money and the banks freeze recipients' funds. Police question Jaako resulting in armed police surveilling Elias’ cabin. Elias gives his sons a USB and tells them to watch it if he is captured or hurt. Hanna interviews a Koivisto Conclave judge. Tapani tells Hanna that they’ve discovered Elias, but when police enter the cabin they find the boys but no Elias. Hanna tells Anne that the judge had selective memory and Anne tells her they must verify the recording and place the tape in a safe. Jarmo discovers the money has been converted to cryptocurrency and cannot be traced. 1994: The county court decision is illegal and they debtors should try a higher court. Present: Debtor Kari drives Elias as Hanna informs police about Kari helping Elias. Jarmo interviews Matti who confesses he helped Elias and did as Lauri ordered: not all the money was to be distributed and there is about 500 million left. In other words, Elias’ plan is incomplete. Elias meets two hackers named Pollux and Castor. Pollux wants another month for “the cable”. Elias says he has two weeks left.
10	2	"Week 2" (Viikko 2)	Juuso Syrjä	Miikko Oikkonen, Juha Siitonen	21 November 2024
Protesters, including Julia, disrupt parliament. 1995: Elias' car loan is rejected and Minna miscarries. Present: Julia is arrested and Jarmo visits her in jail. Hanna tells Susanna she is going to interview Elias and will mention the Conclave. Hanna asks Tapani to verify the recording and to also observe Elias’ video interview. Elias disavows protesters and sends the Conclave recording to Elias’ defence lawyer Liisa. IT expert Salla says he could not trace the video call, but Tapani recognises the Kajaani lime factory in Elias' glasses reflection. Pollux warns Elias that police are approaching, but Elias reminds the hacker twins of their castling plan before he leaves. Tapani chases Elias' motorbike as the twins pour acid over the hard drives. Elias swaps to a car, resulting in Tapani shooting the car's grill and causing the car to catch fire and burn Elias' leg. Hanna hands the Conclave tape to a courier and shows Elias' transcript to Tapani. He and Hanna have sex. Elias collects a new car, Pollux and Castor use a library computer to send "castling" messages to prison inmates, and Jarmo convinces Liisa to inform him if Elias makes contact. Liisa finds Elias sleeping on her couch.
11	3	"Week 3" (Viikko 3)	Marko Mäkilaakso	Miikko Oikkonen, Olli Suitiala	21 November 2024
Liisa gives Elias medical supplies and he uses her laptop to communicate with the twins, but their code is not ready. Liisa tells him she cannot continue with his court case and to find a new lawyer. The protesters are charged with terrorism and the banks unfreeze debtors’ accounts. Jarmo focuses on the money trail, leaving capturing Elias to Tapani. Guards take Lauri to a dentist and Pollux blackmails a guard to aid Lauri. Guards cuff Lauri into the dentist's chair as Tapani learns Lauri's at dentist. Castor sounds the clinic's alarms and the blackmailed guard unlocks Lauri’s cuffs. Lauri fights off the guards and runs out. Tapani follows Lauri, warning him to stop, then shoots him dead. Liisa tells Elias that Minna is filing for divorce and that she has phoned police. Susanna tells Hanna that the ministry wants access to the Conclave recording and Hanna tells her that the recording was sent to the NBI lab so Eve can assist verification. Hanna records Judge Juhani's voice. Elias collects a boat and heads away. Juhani's sound file matches attendee at Conclave who pressured judges to favour banks. Pollux tells Elias that the police shot and killed Lauri. Elias weeps.
12	4	"Week 4" (Viikko 4)	Marko Mäkilaakso	Miikko Oikkonen, Olli Suitiala	21 November 2024
Pollux poses as a cleaner inside the Bank of Finland and installs a hidden camera. Eve lets Elias in and he faints. He apologises to Eve and says he will surrender, but she convinces him to stay two days. Hanna details the Conclave story. Elias uses Eve's phone to contact the twins who tell him that the bank is due for a system update but the code is not ready. Hanna delivers the Conclave transcript to the State Prosecutor, who will consider charges immediately. Jarmo considers that hackers are a better explanation for the Treasury theft than Matti, and that he will get hold of a white-hat hacker to counter any further incursions. The Whitehat explains that Castor and Pollux recoded a computer virus called Industroyer to target specific infrastructures such as power plants or water supply. Jarmo updates Julia on terrorism charges but his superiors are against a public warning to infrastructure organisations and he is suspended. The Whitehat links Hanna’s computer to Elias' hackers and Susanna approves Hanna's draft after the paper’s lawyer affirms it poses no legal threat. They publish the article on Conclave's questionable legality. Elias returns to his campervan. Castor reveals Elias has sepsis.
13	5	"Start of the Week" (Alkuviikko)	Marko Mäkilaakso	Miikko Oikkonen, Juha Siitonen	21 November 2024
The twins take Elias to a clinic for undocumented patients where a doctor treats Elias' scalding and cautions that the sepsis will reach his internal organs. Media report 1990s government corruption. The clinic's guard recognises Elias but he escapes. Castor uses a 3D printer to construct a key and Pollux gets Elias antibiotics. Castor embeds the computer virus in a connector cable. Eve tells Hanna that Elias stayed over and Hanna warns her to never mention it. The clinic's nurse reveals Elias had a septic calf and needs hospitalisation. The Whitehat works out that a hacker named PinPin advised the twins. The Whitehat poses as PinPin, saying there is a fault in the code and a fix will cost 200K. Police surveil where they will exchange the cable but Castor escapes. Elias' video blames the Bank of Finland for the 1990s recession and subsequent government cutbacks, and asks his supporters to attend the Bank. Elias and the twins part as protesters and police surround the bank. Elias dons a riot police uniform, but Jarmo checks the riot police numbers. The bank’s computer is connected to the swapped cable. Elias messages Hanna, posing as Eve, to meet on the newsroom's roof.
14	6	"The Last Day" (Viimeinen päivä)	Juuso Syrjä	Miikko Oikkonen, Ninni Saajola	21 November 2024
Hanna writes her article on Conclave prosecutions and Elias promises to confess. At the bank Eve asks Tapani for Hanna who tells him she left for newsroom. Jarmo arrives and Elias backs towards the roof's edge. Elias points out he could not have robbed Treasury while he was with the hostages and surrenders to Jarmo. Tapani finds Pollux' camera and realises the hack updates the bank's computer to authorise new money going into circulation. Elias is imprisoned. Julia tells Hanna that Elias showed we must act for societal change. Elias requests urgent medical care but the prison officer says the doctor is unavailable until morning. Jarmo is reinstated and wakes Elias for interrogation. Elias realises Tapani killed Lauri, lunges at him, but collapses after denying he took any money. The doctor bans any further interrogation as Elias has severe sepsis and may not recover. Tapani notifies Minna who tells their sons to visit Elias. The sons watch Elias' USB video and Isoniemi enters hospital as Elias' lawyer. He tells Elias that the system protects itself and the Koivisto case will not proceed, with no charges brought against banks, courts, or government. Computer folders are deleted. Elias hires Isoniemi.
