= Miia Tervo =

Finnish filmmaker (born 1980)

Miia Tervo (born February 18, 1980) is a Finnish film director and screenwriter, whose debut feature film Aurora was released in 2019.

She was born in Rovaniemi, Finland, growing up in the small outlying village of Muurola. She spent some time working in a fish processing plant in Norway, before studying creative writing and filmmaking at Orivesi College and Aalto University.

She directed a number of short films in her early career. The most noted of these, Little Snow Animal (Lumikko), won the Grand Prix for Best Short Film at the 2010 Tampere Film Festival, and was a nominee for Best short Film at the 23rd European Film Awards.

Aurora premiered at the Göteborg Film Festival in 2019. The film won seven Jussi Awards in 2020, including Best Film, and two wins for Tervo in Best Director and Best Screenplay. It was also Finland's submission to the Nordic Council Film Prize in 2019.

Her second feature film, The Missile (Ohjus), was screened in 2023 as a work-in-progress at the Helsinki International Film Festival's Finnish Film Affair, where it won the award for Best Fiction Project. It premiered on 27 January 2024 at the Göteborg Film Festival,

== Filmography ==
- The Seal (Hylje) - 2005
- Little Snow Animal (Lumikko) - 2009
- Santra and the Talking Trees (Santra ja puhuvat puut) - 2013
- Clumsy Little Acts of Tenderness (Pieniä kömpelöitä hellyydenosoituksia) - 2015
- It's All Right (Ei mitään hätää) - 2019
- Aurora - 2019
- Lovi - 2021 (TV series, eight episodes)
- The Missile (Ohjus) - 2024
