= Miitta Sorvali =

Finnish actress (born 1956)

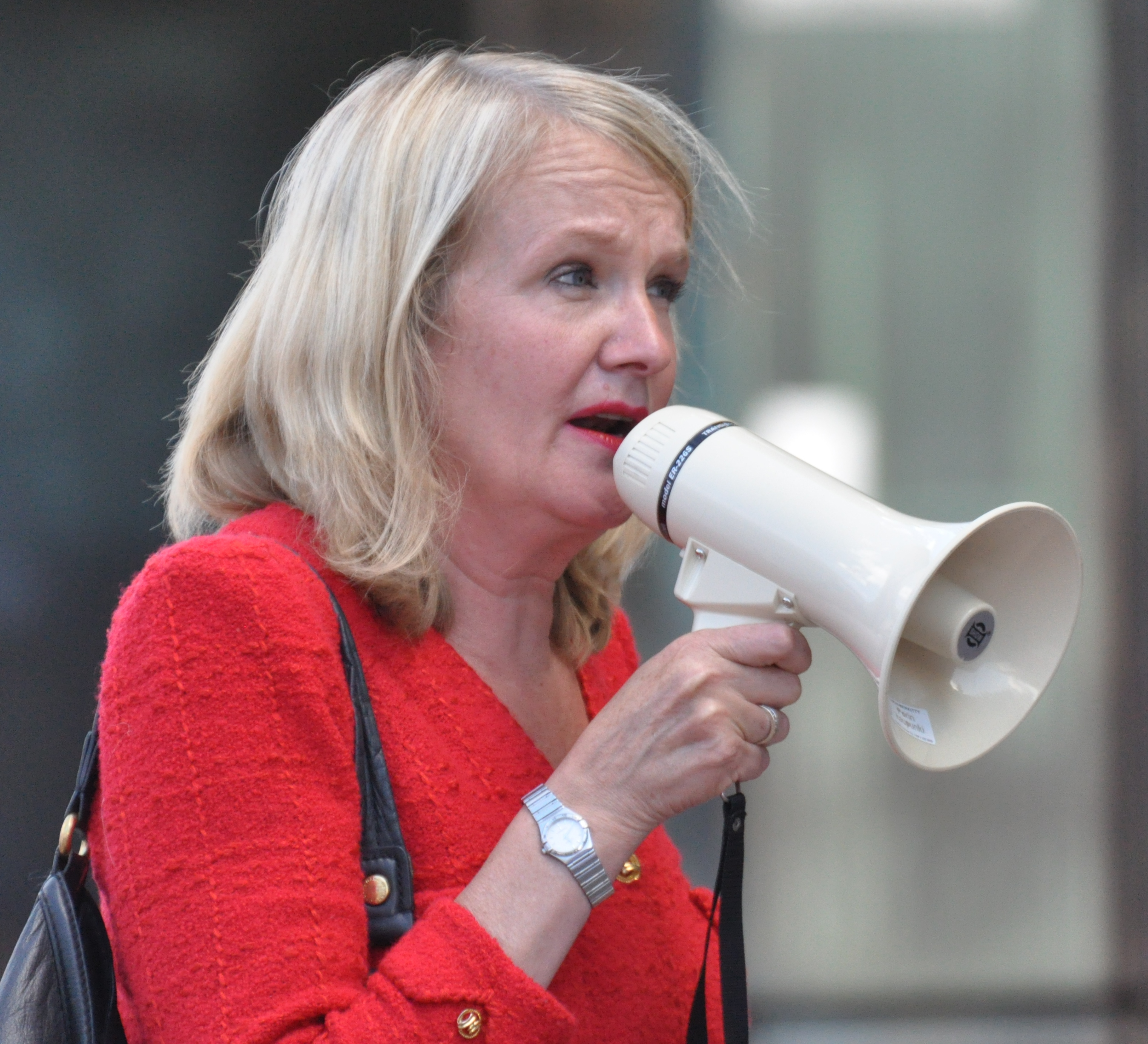
Miitta Sorvali

Miitta Sorvali (born 10 February 1956 in Kitee) is a Finnish theatre, film and television actress. Sorvali's film credits include film credits include Aurora (2019) and Pohjanmaa. She had a part in The Winter War. Her television credits include Röyhkeä diplomaatti, Miitta-täti and Sipoon herttua.

For Aurora, she won a Jussi Award for Best Supporting Actress. Sorvali was married to fellow actor Kari Sorvali from 1978 until his death in 2026.
