= The Missile =

- Theatrical release poster
- Finnish: Ohjus
- Directed by: Miia Tervo
- Screenplay by: Miia Tervo
- Produced by: Daniel Kuitunen; Kaisla Viitala
- Starring: Oona Airola
- Cinematography: Meelis Veeremets
- Edited by: Antti Reikko
- Music by: Lau Nau
- Production companies: Elokuvayhtiö Komeetta; Stellar Film
- Distributed by: SF Film Finland
- Release date: 27 January 2024 (Göteborg)
- Running time: 114 minutes
- Countries: Finland; Estonia
- Languages: Finnish, English, Sámi

The Missile (Finnish: Ohjus) is a 2024 Finnish-Estonian comedy-drama film written and directed by Miia Tervo. Based on the true story of a Soviet missile that crashed at Lake Inari in 1984, the film stars Oona Airola as Niina, an archivist for the local newspaper who has just recently left her abusive husband, and finds new confidence and strength in both her career and her personal life as she becomes increasingly drawn into the newspaper's investigation of the incident.

The cast also includes Pyry Kähkönen, Hannu-Pekka Björkman, Tommi Korpela, Jarkko Niemi, Emma Kilpimaa, Tommi Eronen, Ona Kamu, Sakari Kuosmanen, Milka Ahlroth, Kai Lehtinen, Turkka Mastomäki, Kari Väänänen, Sanna-Kaisa Palo, Tiina Tauraite, Minea Köngäs, Aatos Höglund and Oliver Heikkala in supporting roles.

== Production ==
The film was screened in 2023 as a work-in-progress at the Helsinki International Film Festival's Finnish Film Affair, where it won the award for Best Fiction Project.

== Distribution ==
The film premiered on 27 January 2024 at the Göteborg Film Festival, where Airola won the Dragon Award for Best Acting in a Nordic film.

It went into commercial release in Finland on 2 February 2024.
