= Mother of Mine (film) =

2005 Finnish film

- Theatrical release poster
- Finnish: Äideistä parhain
- Directed by: Klaus Härö
- Screenplay by: Jimmy Karlsson, Kirsi Vikman
- Based on: Äideistä parhain by Heikki Hietamies
- Produced by: Ilkka Matila
- Starring: Topi Majaniemi, Esko Salminen, Maria Lundqvist, Marjaana Maijala, Aino-Maija Tikkanen
- Cinematography: Jarkko T. Laine
- Edited by: Darek Hodor
- Music by: Tuomas Kantelinen
- Distributed by: Columbia TriStar/Nordisk Film Distributors
- Release dates: 30 September 2005 (Finland); 4 November 2005 (Sweden)
- Running time: 111 minutes
- Country: Finland
- Languages: Finnish; Swedish
- Budget: 2,900,000 €

Mother of Mine (Finnish: Äideistä parhain, Swedish: Den bästa av mödrar) is a 2005 Finnish drama film directed by Klaus Härö. The film is based on a novel by Heikki Hietamies. It received good reviews from the Finnish press, and was selected to be Finland's submission for the Academy Award for Best Foreign Language Film at the 78th Academy Awards.

The film had its world premiere at the 2005 Toronto International Film Festival, where it finished fifth in the audience balloting.

== Plot ==
The story is a discussion between Eero and his biological mother (Kirsti), where they are talking to each other and clarifying their misunderstanding and difference in present time. Eero has just come back from his visit from Sweden for Signe's (Swedish mother) funeral.

The plot of the story is based on the time of the Winter War and the Continuation War during the Second World War and the main character of the story is a Finnish boy (Eero Lahti). The biological father of Eero (Kari-Pekka Toivonen) is in the Finnish Army. He dies in the front and Eero's mother Kirsti falls into deep depression. As the war gets worse, Eero is sent to Sweden to a new Swedish family. In the new family, he has a father Hjalmar Jönsson, mother Signe Jönsson and a grandfather (who cannot speak but hears everything). He also meets the neighbor's daughter Siv.

Despite Hjalmar being very welcoming, Eero is not willing to stay in Sweden and wants to go back to his biological mother. Signe is frustrated in Eero's unwillingness to adjust to the situation. She is also frustrated in the language barrier and the fact that she wanted to have a small girl instead of Eero. There is a reason why she wished to have a girl; it is later revealed that she had lost her six-year-old daughter Elin two years earlier in a drowning accident.

In the struggle of the change Signe wants the boy to learn Swedish. After a long struggle to adjust, slowly Signe starts to attach to the boy and she starts loving him. And getting attention, care and affection, the boy starts attaching too, and that leads to their having a tight mother-son relationship.

Years later, Finland withdraws from the war and World War II eventually ends. The children taken to Sweden safe from the war are now being returned to their homes in Finland.

The situation in Finland (Helsinki) gets better, and that means Eero has to return to his biological mother and leave the Jönsson family in Sweden. The bond between his Swedish family has by then grown so much stronger that he is unwilling to go back to Helsinki. But despite his wishes, and Signe's resistance, Eero is sent back to Finland to his mother Kirsti.

Later, in a scene where Eero and his mother are older, Eero tells his mother that back then, it was impossible to ever have the same relationship with his biological mother that they used to. As a child, he was certain that once he lets someone come close to him, he is in risk of losing everything again. Eero was afraid that his mother will leave him again if things get worse. The adult Eero even tells his mother, that when he came back from Skåne, Kirsti (his biological mother) wasn't a mother to him anymore.

== Cast ==
- Topi Majaniemi as Eero Lahti
- Esko Salminen as Eero Lahti (present day)
- Marjaana Maijala as Kirsi Lahti, mother of Eero
- Aino-Maija Tikkanen as Kirsi Lahti (present day)
- Maria Lundqvist as Signe Jönsson, Eero's mother in Sweden
- Michael Nyqvist as Hjalmar Jönsson, Eero's father in Sweden

== Selected awards ==
At Finland's principal annual film awards, the "Jussis", Mother of Mine received nominations in six categories and won three awards:

- Best Actress – Maria Lundqvist
- Best Cinematography – Jarkko T. Laine
- Best Set Design – Cian Bornebusch

At Sweden's official annual film awards, the Guldbagge Awards, Mother of Mine received two nominations, Maria Lundqvist for Best Actress in a leading role (who won), and Michael Nyqvist for Best Actor in a Supporting Role (who lost).

The film won several other awards:

- Golden Pyramid Award at the Cairo International Film Festival
- Lübeck Nordic Film Days
- Palm Springs International Film Festival
- Satellite Award for Best Foreign Language Film
- São Paulo International Film Festival
- Viareggio EuropaCinema

Maria Lundqvist won awards at

- São Paulo International Film Festival
- Jussi Awards
- Guldbagge Awards
- Cairo International Film Festival
- Tallinn Black Nights Film Festival

== See also ==
- Finnish war children
