= Så som i himmelen (musical) =

2018 musical

- Original Stockholm production
- Music: Fredrik Kempe
- Lyrics: Carin Pollak and Fredrik Kempe
- Book: Kay Pollak, Edward af Sillen and Carin Pollak
- Basis: As It Is in Heaven by Kay Pollak
- Premiere: September 13, 2018: Oscarsteatern, Stockholm
- Productions: 2018 Stockholm; 2020 Oslo; 2021 Mo i Rana; 2021 Helsinki; 2021 Linz; 2021 Malmo; 2022 Gothenburg; 2022 Reykjavík; 2023 Copenhagen; 2023 Trondheim

Så som i himmelen is a 2018 musical with music and lyrics by Carin Pollak and Fredrik Kempe and book by Kay Pollak, Edward af Sillen and Carin Pollak and originally directed by Markus Virta. The story is based on the 2004 Swedish movie As It Is in Heaven by Kay Pollak. It tells the story of Daniel Daréus, a successful and world renowned conductor whose life aspiration is to create music that will open people's hearts. After suffering heart attack, he travels back to his hometown of Norrland in the far north of Sweden. Though resistant at first, he begins working with the local choir. They in return help him fix his outlook on life through community spirit and the love of music.

Så som i himmelen premiered at the Oscarsteatern in Stockholm, opening to five star reviews. The original cast starred Philip Jalmelid as Daniel, Malena Ernman as Gabriella, Björn Kjellman as Arne, Anders Ekborg as Stig and Tuva B Larsen as Lena. Productions have also been staged in Norway Finland, Austria and Iceland.

== Production history ==
=== Stockholm (2018–20) ===
Så som i himmelen had its premier on 13 September 2018 in Stockholm's Oscarsteatern. The limited run was extended multiple times, through to 2020.

=== Oslo (2020) ===
The first international production of Så som i himmelen had its premier at the Oslo Nye Teater on 30 January 2020 but closed due to COVID-19, then returned on 8 April 2022. This productions used a new version of the set. A Norwegian tour by the Oslo production then took place, stopping in Bergen, Skien, Kristiansand, Tønsberg, Trondheim, Lillestrøm, Lillehammer and Stavanger before returning to Oslo Nye Teater in 2023.

=== Mo i Rana (2021) ===
On 13 February 2021, Nordland Teater premiered their own Northern Norwegian version of Så som i himmelen. Making it the 2nd Norwegian production, but the 1st in Nordland and Nordland Teater's biggest production ever. Their production went on tour visiting Tromsø, Finnsnes, Harstad, Sortland, Svolvær, Leknes, Narvik, Bodø, Mosjøen and Sandnessjøen.

=== Helsinki (2021) ===
Titled Niin kuin taivaassa, the musical opened in the Helsingin Kaupunginteatteri on 26 August 2021.

=== Linz (2021) ===
Austria debuted the original German translation of the musical Wie im Himmel in the Landestheater in Linz on 11 September 2021.

=== Malmö (2022) ===
A brand new Swedish cast took to the Malmö Opera stage from 30 April 2022.

=== Gothenburg (2022) ===
The entire original Stockholm cast were meant to take the musical to The Theater Gothia Towers in 2020, but this was postponed due to COVID-19. Instead the Gothenburg production ran in the Scandinavium instead from 27 May to 5 June 2022.

=== Reykjavík (2022) ===
An Icelandic translation of the musical opened on 16 September 2022 in the National Theatre of Iceland titled Sem á himni.

=== Copenhagen (2023) ===
Denmark is the final Nordic country to stage the musical, under the title Som i himlen, in the Copenhagen Opera House. Opening 18 November 2023.

=== Other notable productions ===
At the end of the Stockholm run, to celebrate its success, the full original cast performed a series of concerts under the title En himmelsk musikalkonsert. Two in Skansen and one Dalhalla in Rättvik. It featured songs from the musical, as well as songs from Broadway and West End shows.

SäffleOperan were the first semi-professional house in the world to premiere Så som i himmelen in Sweden on 1 October 2022. Andreas Hoff played Daniel, after also performing the role in Nordland Teater's production in Norway. Rikard Björk also reprised his role of Tore from the original Stockholm cast.

Germany's 1st production of Wie im Himmel will also be the musical's fully no-profit amateur debut, and premiered on 10 November 2022 in Rheda-Wiedenbrück by Musical-Fabrik.

== Orchestrations ==
Original Stockholm Orchestrations:

- Keys1(Piano/conductor)
- Keys 2
- Keys 3
- Reed 1(Flute)
- Reed 2(Clarinet/Saxophone)
- French horn
- Violin
- Cello 1
- Cello 2
- Guitar
- Bass Guitar
- Percussion

Reworked Oslo Orchestrations:

- Keys 1(Piano/conductor)
- Keys 2
- Reed 1(Flute)
- Reed 2(Clarinet/saxophone)
- French horn
- Strings 1(Violin)
- Strings 2(Violin, Viola & Accordion)
- Strings 3(Cello)
- Guitar
- Bass Guitar
- Percussion

The Stockholm and Mo I Rana Cast recordings uses an alternate symphonic orchestration written for a 24 piece Orchestra

== Characters ==
Daniel-(Male, late 30's, Tenor/C3-B4) The protagonist, a world renowned violinist and conductor. Suffers a heart attack during a performance and is told by doctors that he is running out of time. Decides to live his remaining days back in his old hometown. He decides to coach the local Church choir, and falls in love with Lena. He dies of another heart attack at the shows end.

Lena-(Female, late 20's, Soprano/F3-E5) A joyful and naive girl who worked at the local store, she has yet to figure things out in life and yearns for something more. Falls in love with Daniel.

Stig(Male, Late 50's, Baritenor/C3-Ab4) The shows main Antagonist, The Conservative local priest, he hates the way Daniel works and feels replaced and cast out by him. He later tries to kill Daniel but can't bring himself to do it and breaks down

Gabriella(Female, 40's, Mezzo/F3-Eb5) A member of the choir and mother of 2, is a victim of domestic abuse by her husband Conny, has a huge singing talent

Arne(Male, 40's, Comedic Tenor/C3-G4) The owner of the local shop, and self proclaimed "manager" of the choir. High self esteem and a bit of a temperament, can come of as rude, but has a good heart behind all the jokes.

Inger(Female, Late 50's, Alto/C3-B4) Stig's wife, finds new joy in life when Daniel arrives, and grows more and more tired of Stigs conservative ways, eventually she leaves him)

Tore(Male, late 20's, Bass/F2-C4) The Mentally ill cousin of Arne, has the responsibility to close the church at night, has a close friendship with Lena, he eventually joins the choir

Conny(Male, 40's, Non singing) The shows Secondary Antagonist, The husband of Gabriella, Abusive and has an alcohol problem

Siv(Female, 50's, Alto) A minor antagonist, the conservative initial conductor of the choir before Daniel arrives, grows more and more sceptical of Daniels ways

Holmfrid(Male, 40's, Baritone) A member of the choir, a big guy with a bigger heart, comforts Gabriella in her darkest hours. Has been a subject of fatshaming by Arne all his life, bur after he snaps at him, they grow closer and eventually become best friends.

Olga(Female, late 70's, Alto) The oldest member of the choir, an old, joyful and wise woman who has been single all her life. Eventually falls in love with Erik

Erik(Male, Late 70's, Baritone) An older man in the choir, silent and kind, is secretly in love with Olga.

Florence(Female, 20's, Mezzo) A socially awkward girl in the choir, who finds new courage through Daniel's ways

Amanda(Female,20's, Soprano) A silent and jumpy girl in the choir.Has an excuse for everything.

== Casts ==
The principal original casts of the major productions of Så som i himmelen.

| Characters | Original Stockholm Cast | Original Oslo Cast | Original Mo i Rana Cast | Original Helsinki Cast | Original Linz Cast | Original Malmö Cast | Original Reykjavík Cast | Original Copenhagen Cast |
|---|---|---|---|---|---|---|---|---|
| Daniel | Philip Jalmelid | Hans Marius Hoff Mittet | Andreas Hoff | Tuukka Leppänen | Mathias Edenborn / Christian Fröhlich | Fredrik Lycke | Elmar Gilbertsson | Carsten Svendsen |
| Lena | Tuva B Larsen | Heidi Ruud Ellingsen / Lene Kokai Flage | Karoline Dons | Oona Airola | Celina dos Santos | Ester Hedlund | Salka Sól Eyfeld | Sicilia Gadborg Høegh |
| Gabriella | Malena Ernman | Jannike Kruse/Solveig Andsnes | Christine Guldbrandsen | Emilia Nyman | Judith Jandl / Sanne Mieloo | Jenny Holmgren | Valgerður Guðnadóttir | Maria Lucia Heiberg Rosenberg |
| Arne | Björn Kjellman / Morgan Alling | Jan Martin Johnsen | Finn Arve Sørbøe | Puntti Valtonen | Gernot Romic | Erik Gullbransson | Guðjón Davíð Karlsson | Thomas Malling |
| Stig | Anders Ekborg | Johannes Joner | Per-Egil Aske | Antti Timonen | Karsten Kenzel | Rolf Lydahl | Hinrik Ólafsson | Jesper Lundgaard |
| Inger | Sara Jangfeldt | Trine Wenberg Svensen | Kirsti Eline Torhaug | Sanna Majuri | Daniela Dett | Åsa Fång | Katrín Halldóra Sigurðardóttir | Cecilie Stenspil |
| Conny | Christopher Wollter | Niklas Gundersen | Rune Storsæther Løding | Olli Rahkonen | Sebastian von Malfer | Michael Jansson | Kjartan Darri Kristjánsson | Kristian Rossen |
| Tore | Rikard Björk | Modou Bah | Espen Bråten Kristoffersen | Paavo Kääriäinen / Jaakko Lahtinen | Lukas Sandmann | Patrik Hont | Almar Blær Sigurjónsson | Mathias Hartmann Niclasen |
| Olga | Beatrice Järås | Kari-Ann Grønsund | Elisabeth Moberg | Sinikka Sokka | Birgit Zamulo | Carina Söderman | Ragnheiður K. Steindórsdóttir | Betty Glosted |
| Siv | Thérèse Andersson Lewis | Helle Haugen | Anna Karoline Bjelvin | Anna Victoria Eriksson | Hanna Kastner | Lisa Larsson | Sigríður Eyrún Friðriksdóttir | Nicoline Siff Møller |
| Holmfrid | Linus Eklund Adolphson | Porfirio Gutierrez | Kristian Krokslett | Tuomas Uusitalo | Robert G. Neumayr | Klas Wiljergård | Hallgrímur Ólafsson | Lars Arvad |
| Erik | Magnus Loftsson | Mads Henning Skar-Jørgensen | Kyrre Krøger Vanebo | Kari Mattila | William Mason | Magnus Borén | Örn Árnason | Jakob Højlev Jørgensen |
| Florence | Annica Edstam | Suzanne Paalgard | Marte Hansen | Helena Haaranen | Tina Schöltzke | Hanna Ulvan | Sigurður Sigurjónsson | Nadin Reiness |
| Amanda | Karolin Funke | Mari Dahl Sæther / Henriette Faye-Schjøll | Hannah Schulte Strid | Raili Raitala | Nina Weiß | Nina Pressing | Edda Björgvinsdóttir | Nina Pressing |

=== Notable cast replacements ===
==== Oslo ====
Lena: Natalie Bjerke Roland(Replaced Heidi Ruud Ellingsen in March 2023)

Stig: Erik Wenberg Jacobsen(Replaced Johannes Joner in March 2023)

Arne: Gunnar Eirikson(Alternated with Jon Martin Johnsen from 2022)

Conny: Petter Vermeli, Sindre Postholm(Alternated the role from 2022)

Siv: Siw Anita Andersen(Replaced Helle Haugen in March 2023)

== Musical numbers ==
=== Act I ===
- "Prologue"-Orchestra
- "Den tid jag har"(My time on earth) - Daniel
- "Man vet aldrig när det händer"(You'll never know when it happens)-Olga and Lena
- "Fråga Arne"(Ask Arne)- Arne and Ensemble
- "Stilla natt/De berör mig"(Silent night/They move me)-Daniel and the Choir
- "Mycket som är fint"(A lot of things are great)-The Choir
- "Du är aldrig ensam"(You are never lonely)-Lene and Daniel
- "Körövningarna"(Choir practice)-Daniel and the Choir)
- "Säg aldrig nej till Gud"(Do not say no to god)-Stig
- "58 sekunder"(58 Seconds)-Daniel
- "Härlig är jorden"(Joy to Earth)-The Choir
- "Lena och Tores vals"(Lena and Tores Waltz)-Lena and Tore
- "Gabriellas sång"(Gabriellas Song)- Gabriella

=== Act II ===
- "Entr'acte"-Orchestra
- "Vi gjorde succé"(We made success)-The choir
- "En sång till livet" (A song to life)- Gabriella, Lena, The choir and Ensemble
- "Alla ord om synd"(All the words of sin) - Inger
- "Änglasång"(Angelsong) - Lena
- "Stjärnorna"(Stars) - Gabriella The Choir and Ensemble
- "Hur tro du att det känns"(How do you think i feel?) - Stig
- "Reser fast jag inte vill"(I'll leave even if i dont want to) - Daniel
- "På grund av dig"(Because of You) - Daniel and Lena
- "Det vi är ska aldrig dö"(What we have Will never die)-Lena and Daniel
- "Så som i himmelen"(As it is in heaven)-Orchestra
- "Tonerna"(Tones)- Ensemble

== Recordings ==
The Original Stockholm Cast recording was released on 7 December 2018 by Playground Music. It was recorded in the studio of Benny Andersson from ABBA.

Tracklist

1. Så som i Himmelen - Daniel Migdal - 4:46
2. Den tid jag har - Philip Jalmelid - 4:18
3. Fråga Arne - Björn Kjellman & Så som i Himmelen Ensemblen - 2:38
4. Gabriellas sång - Malena Ernman & Så som i Himmelen Ensemblen - 3:36
5. En sång till livet - Tuva B Larsen, Malena Ernman & Så som i Himmelen Ensemblen - 3:01
6. Alla ord om synd - Sara Jangfeldt - 3:54
7. Änglasång - Tuva B Larsen - 3:07
8. Stjärnorna - Malena Ernman & Så som i Himmelen Ensemblen - 3:24
9. Hur tror du att det känns - Anders Ekborg - 3:08
10. Reser fast jag inte vill - Philip Jalmelid - 2:33
11. På grund av dig - Philip Jalmelid & Tuva B Larsen - 3:19
12. Så som i Himmelen - Ensemblen - 2:30

Oslo Nye Teater released their cast recording on 17 March 2020.

Tracklist

1. Den Tid Jeg Har - 3:57
2. Man Vet Aldri Når Det Hender - 1:45
3. Snakk Med Arne - 3:05
4. Du Er Aldri Alene - 2:49
5. Gabriellas Sang - 3:36
6. En Sang til Livet - 2:49
7. Alle Ord om Synd - 3:15
8. Englesang - 2:43
9. Hva Tror Du at Jeg Føler Nå - 3:19
10. Drar Selv om Jeg Ikke Vil - 2:22
11. På Grunn av Deg - 4:03
12. Så som i Himmelen - 2:06

3 tracks from the Nordland Teater production were released on 5 March 2021.

Tracklist

1. Gabriellas sang - Christine Guldbrandsen - 3:33
2. Den tid æ har - Andreas Hoff - 4:17
3. På grunn av dæ - Karoline Dons & Andreas Hoff - 3:18
