= Kirsti Manninen =

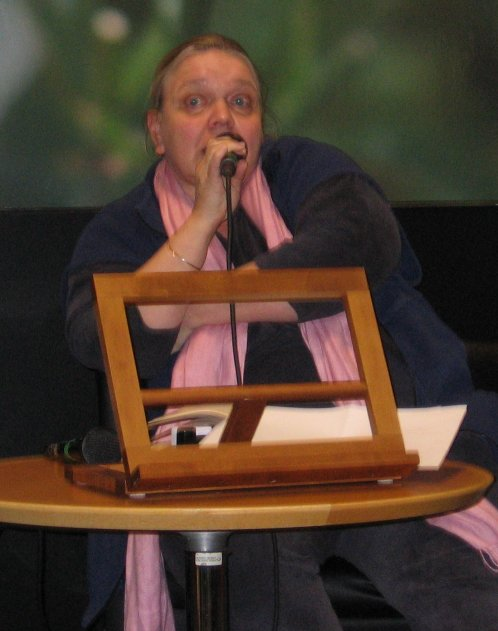
Kirsti Manninen at Helsinki Book Fair, 2009

Kirsti Marjatta Manninen (born 22 October 1952 in Seinäjoki) is a Finnish writer and screenwriter. She has produced over one hundred works under her own name as well as under her pen name Enni Mustonen.

Manninen studied Finnish literature, history, the Finnish language, pedagogy and journalism at the University of Helsinki.

Manninen's father is the writer Pekka Aukia, and her daughter Katri Manninen is also a writer. Her sons, Kusti and Jaakko, are musicians.

Manninen lives in Mäntsälä and has written about its local history.
