= Klaus Härö =

Finnish film director (born 1971)

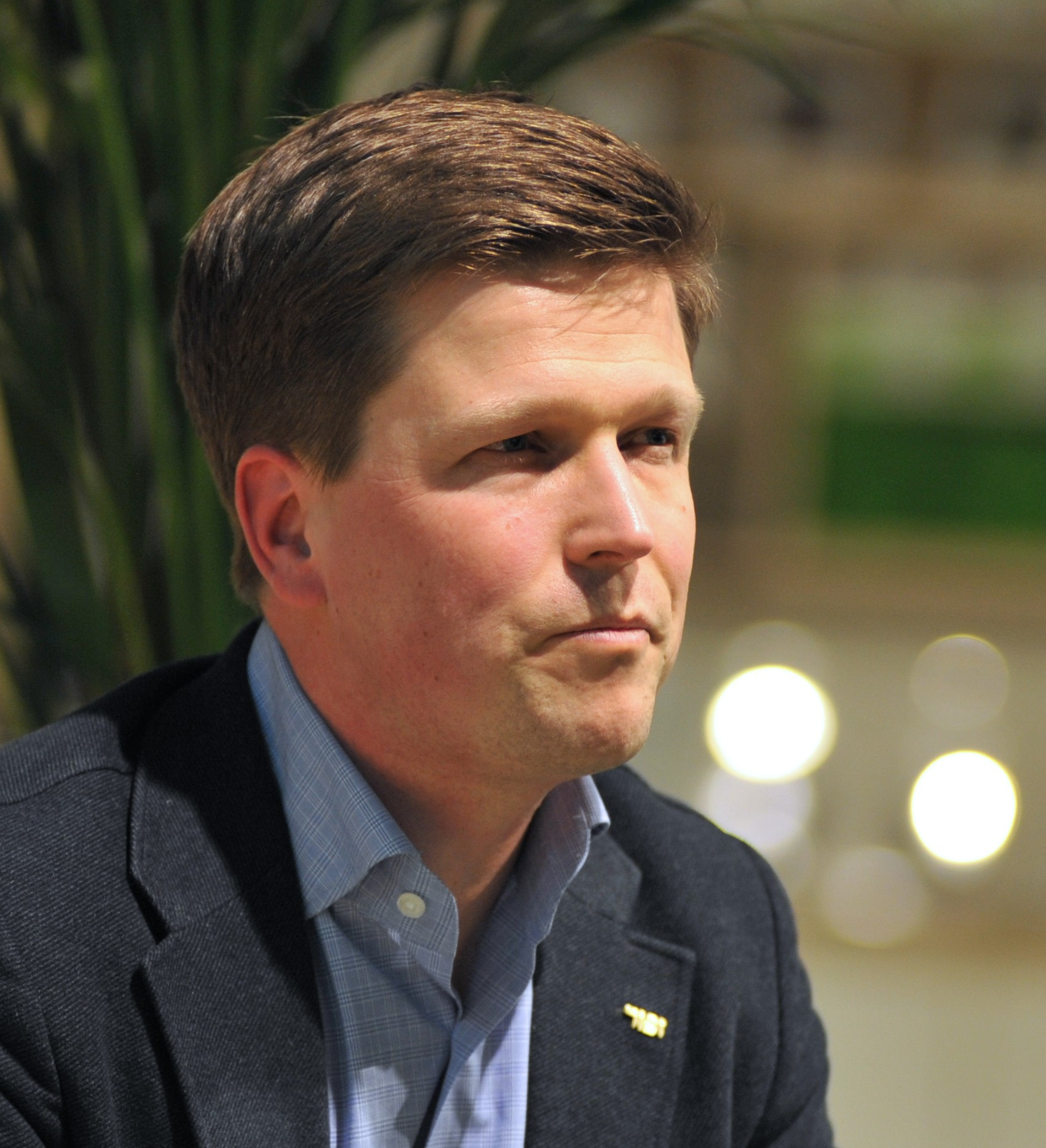
- Klaus Härö in 2010.
- Born: 31 March 1971 (age 55)
- Occupation: Film director

Klaus Härö (Finnish: [ˈklɑu̯s ˈhærø]; born 31 March 1971 in Porvoo, Finland) is a Finnish film director. In 2004, he won Finland's State Prize for Art.

== Biography ==
Härö grew up in a Swedish-speaking Finnish family. He studied directing and attended screen writing seminars at the University of Industrial Arts in Helsinki. He has directed several feature films, including Elina: As If I Wasn't There (2003), Mother of Mine (2005) and The New Man (2007), as well as documentaries and short films. He works in both Sweden and Finland.

Klaus Härö in 2026

In 2003 Klaus Härö received the Ingmar Bergman Award, the winner of which was chosen by Ingmar Bergman himself. Four of Härö's features were chosen as Finland's submission for the best foreign-language film category at the Oscars.

== Films ==
- Elina: As If I Wasn't There (2003)
- Mother of Mine (2005)
- The New Man (2007)
- Letters to Father Jacob (2009)
- The Fencer (2015)
- One Last Deal (2018)
- Life After Death (2020)
- My Sailor, My Love (2022)
- Never Alone (2025)

== See also ==
- Finnish cinema
- List of Finnish submissions for the Academy Award for Best Foreign Language Film
- Aki Kaurismäki
