= Olli Mäki =

Finnish boxer (1936–2019)

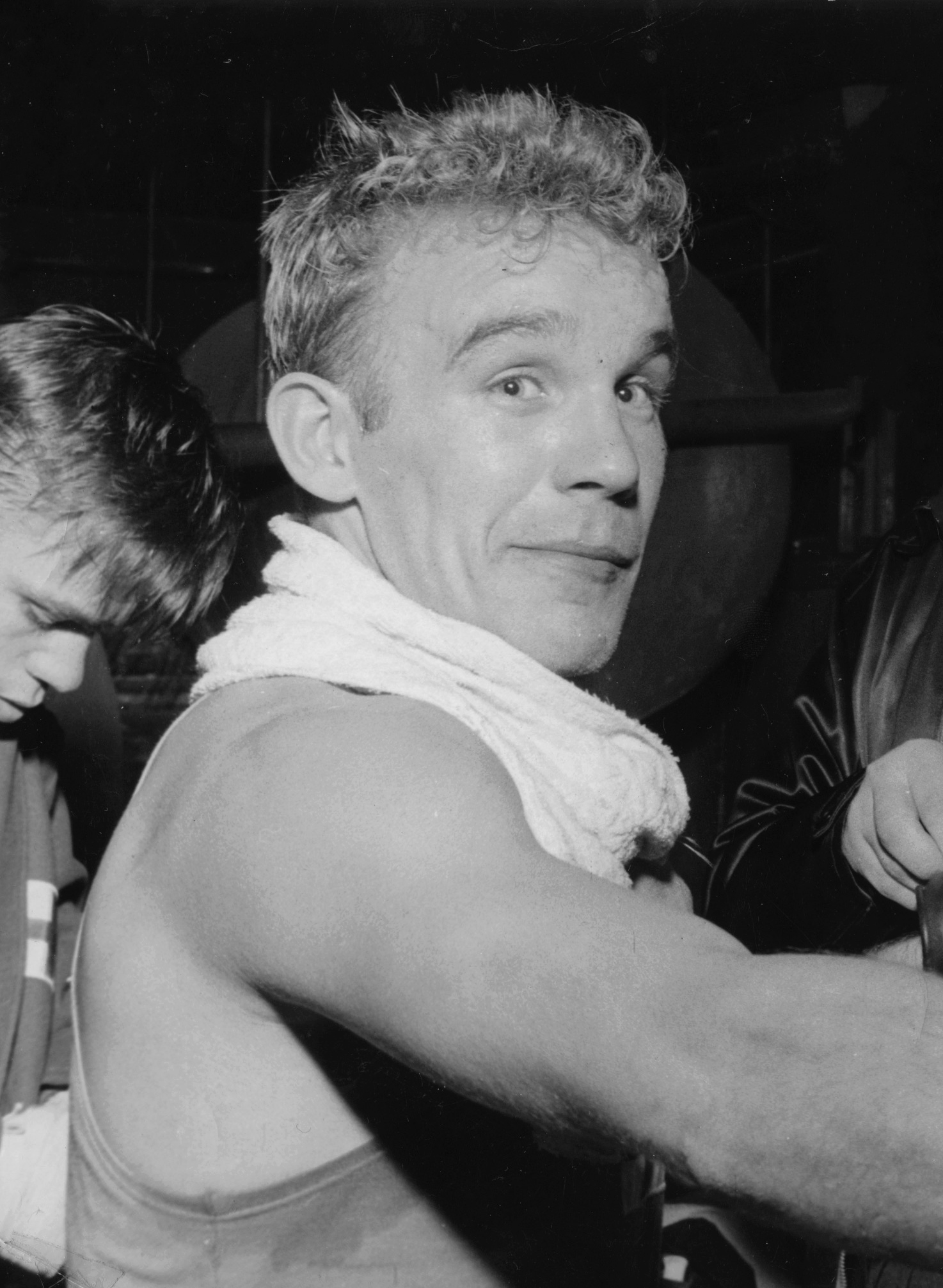
- Mäki in 1958

Personal information
- Full name: Olli Johan Oskari Mäki
- Nationality: Finnish
- Born: 22 December 1936 Kokkola, Finland
- Died: 6 April 2019 (aged 82) Kirkkonummi, Finland

Sport
- Sport: Boxing
- Weight class: Featherweight, lightweight
Medal record
Representing Finland
European Amateur Championships
Gold medal – first place	1959 Lucerne	Lightweight
Silver medal – second place	1957 Prague	Lightweight

Olli Johan Oskari Mäki (22 December 1936 – 6 April 2019) was a Finnish boxer. As an amateur, he won the European lightweight title in 1959, having placed second in 1957. After being dropped from the 1960 Olympic team, he turned professional and fought until 1973 with a record of 28 victories, 14 losses and 8 draws. In August 1962 he was beaten in two rounds by Davey Moore for the World Featherweight Title, and in February 1964 he won the European Boxing Union light welterweight title against Conny Rudhof; he lost it to Rudhof in 1967. In retirement Mäki worked as a boxing coach and manager.

The 2016 film The Happiest Day in the Life of Olli Mäki is based on his life.

Mäki died after a long illness on 6 April 2019, aged 82. He had been suffering from dementia and Alzheimer's disease.
