= The Happiest Day in the Life of Olli Mäki =

2016 film by Juho Kuosmanen

- Film poster
- Finnish: Hymyilevä mies
- Literally: Smiling man
- Directed by: Juho Kuosmanen
- Written by: Mikko Myllylahti; Juho Kuosmanen
- Produced by: Jussi Rantamäki
- Starring: Jarkko Lahti; Oona Airola; Eero Milonoff
- Cinematography: J-P Passi
- Edited by: Jussi Rautaniemi
- Music by: Miika Snåre; Laura Airola; Joonas Haavisto
- Production companies: Aamu Film Company; One Two Films; Film i Väst; Tre Vänner Produktioner
- Distributed by: B-Plan Distribution (Finland)
- Release dates: 19 May 2016 (Cannes); 2 September 2016 (Finland)
- Running time: 93 minutes
- Countries: Finland; Sweden; Germany
- Languages: Finnish; English

The Happiest Day in the Life of Olli Mäki (Finnish: Hymyilevä mies, lit. 'Smiling man') is a 2016 biographical drama film directed by Juho Kuosmanen and written by Mikko Myllylahti and Kuosmanen. An international co-production between Finland, Sweden, and Germany, the film stars Jarkko Lahti, Oona Airola, and Eero Milonoff. It tells the true story of Olli Mäki, the famous Finnish boxer who had a shot at the 1962 World Featherweight title.

The film had its world premiere at the 69th Cannes Film Festival on 19 May 2016, where it was awarded the Un Certain Regard prize. It was theatrically released in Finland on 2 September 2016, by B-Plan Distribution. It received generally positive reviews from critics and was selected as the Finnish entry for the Best Foreign Language Film at the 89th Academy Awards, but it was not nominated. At the 71st Jussi Awards, the film earned a leading ten nominations and won in eight categories, including Best Film, Best Director, Best Actor (for Lahti), and Best Supporting Actress (for Airola). Kuosmanen also won the European Discovery at the 29th European Film Awards.

== Plot ==
It's the year 1962: Olli Mäki is a Finnish amateur-turned-professional boxer from the town of Kokkola who, while attending a wedding, becomes smitten with his friend Raija. They travel to Helsinki where his manager Elis Ask is preparing Olli's big break: a World Boxing Association featherweight championship title fight against renowned American boxer Davey Moore in the Helsinki Olympic Stadium. The match would be one of the biggest events in Finnish sporting history, even though most people – including Olli – are skeptical: Moore's record vastly outclasses Olli's.

The preparations are not without problems: Olli is lightweight and has to lose enough weight within two weeks to reach featherweight, Elis' enthusiasm about the match includes hiring a documentary film crew who become increasingly disruptive as the preparations go on, and staging various dinner parties with the sponsors of the match which require the uncomfortable Olli to adhere to protocol. The circus around the match disheartens Olli, who falls more and more in love with Raija – Raija, however, feels she's a burden on Olli's preparation, and goes back to Kokkola. Olli has a hard time concentrating, and eventually follows Raija, much to the dismay of Elis, who is concerned that Olli won't make weight by the time the weigh-in comes, let alone be prepared for the match itself.

Olli eventually persuades Elis to leave him to prepare on his own, and puts himself through a drastic process of losing weight: during the weigh-in, he barely makes weight, and on the same day, he proposes to Raija. As the match begins, Olli has a good start in the first round, but gets knocked down several times in the second and the referee calls for a technical knockout. While Elis is disappointed, Olli seems to be at peace with the loss, and quietly walks away from the post-match dinner with Raija.

== Cast ==
- Jarkko Lahti as Olli Mäki
- Oona Airola as Raija Jänkä
- Eero Milonoff as Elis Ask
- John Bosco Jr. as Davey Moore

The real Olli and Raija Mäki appear briefly at the very end of the film, as Raija looks at them and asks Olli "Do you think we'll be like them when we're old?"

== Production ==
The Happiest Day in the Life of Olli Mäki was the feature-length debut of director Juho Kuosmanen, who had previously directed short films as well as theatre and opera productions.

The film was shot on location, mostly in Helsinki. To achieve the 1960s look, Kuosmanen and cinematographer Jani-Petteri Passi decided to film on 16mm Kodak Tri-X black and white film stock. They felt this gave the film a vintage look even though the film stock was not meant for feature films. The production team ended up ordering all the stock available in Europe and the United States after which Kodak had to produce more.

== Reception ==
=== Critical response ===
On the review aggregator website Rotten Tomatoes, 98% of 56 critics' reviews are positive, with an average rating of 7.6/10. The website's consensus reads: "The Happiest Day in the Life of Olli Mäki sidesteps sports biopic clichés with a beautifully filmed, well-acted look at the balance between career fulfillment and personal happiness." Metacritic, which uses a weighted average, assigned the film a score of 83 out of 100, based on 17 critics, indicating "universal acclaim".

Peter Bradshaw of The Guardian gave the film 4 out of 5 stars, and described it as "a gentle, shrewd, somehow mysterious love story, based on real life, beautifully photographed in luminous black-and-white and drawing inspiration from Scorsese and Truffaut." Manohla Dargis of The New York Times stated, "The Happiest Day in the Life of Olli Maki deepens quietly. […] It's a bit of a narrative slow-boil — the story arrives in pieces, in disconnected scenes and conversational fragments — but it grabs you right from the start. The most obvious reason is the dense, luxuriant black-and-white cinematography, which is very pleasurable in its own right." David Rooney of The Hollywood Reporter called the film "a small marvel of impeccable craftsmanship", lauding its black and white cinematography and "faultless and unshowy" performances. Geoffrey Macnab of The Independent said Olli Mäki "rethinks and revitalises" the genre of boxing movies and also found it one of the year's most likeable films. Both Macnab and Kristopher Tapley of Variety called the film a leading contender for the foreign language Oscar.

=== Accolades ===
The film has won several awards at film festivals:

- Un Certain Regard, Cannes Film Festival;
- Golden Eye, Zurich Film Festival;
- Gold Hugo, New Directors Competition, Chicago International Film Festival;
- Grand Prix, Saint-Jean-de-Luz International Film Festival.

The film also won eight Jussi Awards at the 71st Jussi Awards in 2017.

- Best Film (Jussi Rantamäki, producer)
- Best Director (Juho Kuosmanen)
- Best Actor (Jarkko Lahti)
- Best Supporting Actress (Oona Airola)
- Best Cinematography (J-P Passi)
- Best Editing (Jussi Rautaniemi)
- Best Costume Design (Sari Suominen)
- Best Makeup (Salla Yli-Luopa)

== See also ==
- List of boxing films
- List of submissions to the 89th Academy Awards for Best Foreign Language Film
- List of Finnish submissions for the Academy Award for Best Foreign Language Film
